= Umberto Masotto =

Italian captain (1864–1896)

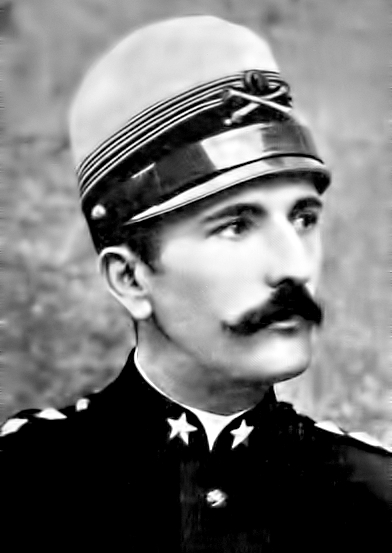
- Born: 23 November 1864; Noventa Vicentina, Lombardy–Venetia, Austria
- Died: 1 March 1896 (aged 31); Adwa, Tigray, Ethiopia
- Military career
- Allegiance: Italy
- Branch: Royal Italian Army
- Service years: 1878 – 1896
- Rank: Captain
- Commands: 4th Mountain Artillery Battery
- Conflicts: Mahdist War: First Battle of Agordat; First Italo-Ethiopian War: Battle of Adwa †
- Awards: Gold Medal of Military Valour

Umberto Masotto (1864–1896) was an Italian Captain who served in the First Italo-Ethiopian War. He commanded the 4th Mountain Artillery Battery during the Battle of Adwa but was more famously known for being the first field gunner to receive the Gold Medal of Military Valour.

== Military career ==
Born into Villa Manin Cantarella which was owned by his family on 23 November 1864, as the son of Giacomo and Anna Giusti. After having attended the Technical School of Arzignano as a boarder, attracted by a career in arms, he was a student of the Military College of Milan from 1878 to 1882 and of the Royal Military Academy of Artillery and Engineers of Turin. On 27 August 1884, at the age of only twenty, he was promoted to second lieutenant of artillery and subsequently attended the School of Application of the weapon of Turin. On 1 July 1886, he was promoted to lieutenant and was assigned to the 16th Field Artillery Regiment but he requested to be part of the Expeditionary Corps in Africa to fight the Italian colonial wars, commanded by General Alessandro Asinari di San Marzano and left in March 1887 for Massawa with the colonial expeditionary force under the command of Colonel Tancredi Saletta which also included two sections of mountain artillery.

He was then transferred to the forces under Captain Federico Ciccodicola and together, they formed the indigenous mountain battery on 3 October 1888. In 1889 with the "Indigeni" Battery, he participated in the occupation of Asmara and in General Baldassare Orero at Adwa from 15 January to 9 February 1890, and in the First Battle of Agordat on 21 December 1893, where he received the bronze medal at Bronze Medal of Military Valour.

The testimonies that appeared in the "Corriere della Sera" and in the other newspapers of the time outline a warm and human personality. After seven years in Africa and mapping topographical maps, supervising plantations and transporting cannons from Massawa to the forts, they had let him repatriate without making him a knight.

Repatriated after seven years of service in Eritrea for surplus staff, he was promoted to captain and assigned to the 22nd Field Artillery Regiment of Messina in August 1894, since in that same year a battery was formed in that regiment from the mountains, which was considered necessary for the mountainous areas of Sicily. At the end of 1895, the battery split and the two batteries left for Africa, Masotto commanded the 4th battery of the Mountain Brigade under the orders of the major Francesco De Rosa, titled the "Sicilian battery" because it was formed with Sicilian officers and soldiers. Thus Masotto returned to Eritrea for the second time after the Imperial Ethiopian Army destroyed Pietro Toselli's battalion at the Battle of Amba Alagi and after the Battle of Mekelle.

== Battle of Adwa ==
On 1 March 1896, the Battle of Adwa took place where the brave service of the indigenous Mountain Artillerymen and Mountain Batteries appeared, who, being part of Major De Rosa's Artillery Brigade, fought with the column of General Matteo Albertone, formed entirely by Eritrean battalions, it was composed of four artillery batteries: two indigenous and the two so-called "Sicilian", commanded respectively by Captains Edoardo Bianchini and Masotto. The column marched rapidly until it exceeded the indicated objective, went further and came near the Abyssinian camp with the information being learnt that the Abyssinians had more than a hundred thousand men and with the Italians just eighteen thousand men. The column, which had moved away from the Raja towards the Semaiata due to a fatal misunderstanding, finding itself isolated from the other two, was attacked by the Ethiopians just as the two batteries were parading along an uncomfortable mountainous path as the Italians began to lose the battle. The Ethiopian forces screamed and the confusion was aggravated by a cloud of smoke that rose from the stubble ignited by the Ethiopian artillery shells. For a while, it seemed that the four batteries had managed to repel the adversaries, but they returned to the attack more numerous than before. General Albertone gave the order to retreat to the remains of the Eritrean battalions, but not to all, since the two "Sicilian" batteries were ordered to remain in place, to fire until the last shot and to sacrifice themselves to cover the retreat.

Captain Masotto remained with his gunners and was intrepid during the strenuous fight to protect retreating infantry units as when all hope was lost, he went with serene courage to sacrifice his life. He fell on a cannon, with the pistol in his right hand before being pierced by the spears and sabres of the Ethiopian forces as his officers and soldiers joined him in a last stand, using up all the ammunition of their 14 guns before meeting a similar fate. For this action, Masotto was posthumously awarded the Gold Medal of Military Valour on March 11, 1898. The Technical Commercial Institute of Noventa Vicentina was also entitled to the heroic figure of the soldier.

== Legacy ==
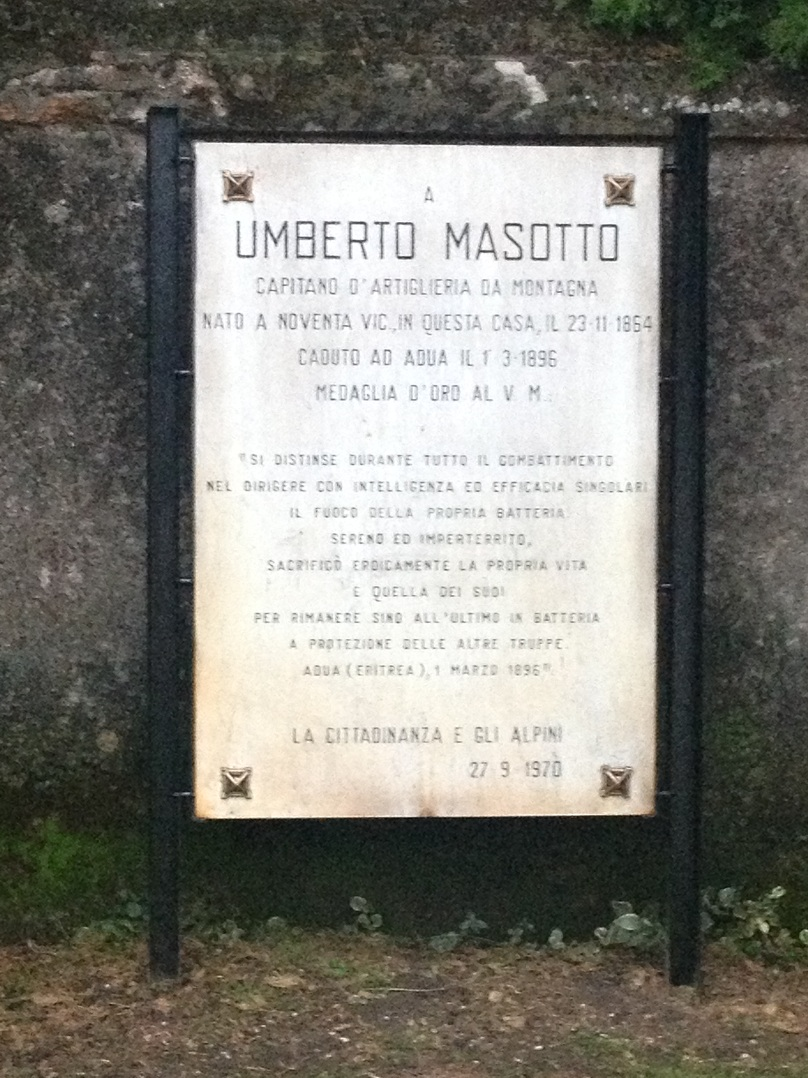
A Commemorative plaque of Umberto Masotto in the garden of Villa Manin Cantarella.

A few months after the Battle of Adwa, it was decided by Messina deputy Nicola Fulci to erect a monument to the memory of the two "Sicilian" batteries which were erected by sculptor Salvatore Buemi. The bronze monument was modeled in Rome in 1896 and then cast in Turin at the base of the monument two commemorative plaques were affixed with the names of the fallen gunners commanded by captains Masotto and Bianchini.
