= Giuseppe Baudoin =

Italian major (1845–1896)

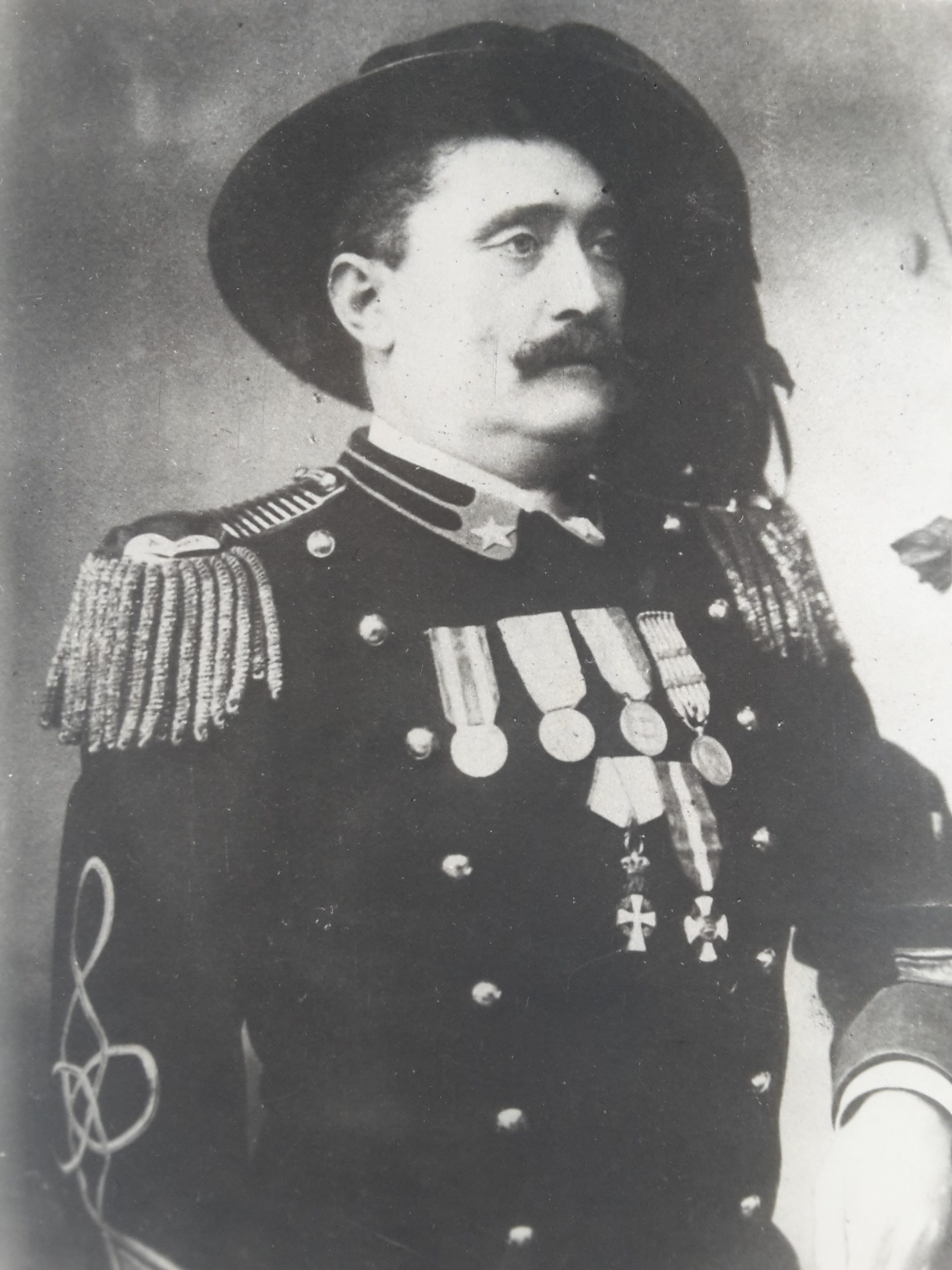
- Born: February 25, 1843; Nice, Piedmont, Sardinia
- Died: March 1, 1896 (aged 53); Adwa, Tigray, Ethiopia
- Spouse: Athalie Maria Hervey Brabazon (m. 1895)
- Military career
- Allegiance: Italy
- Branch: Royal Italian Army
- Service years: 1860–1896
- Rank: Major
- Commands: 9th Africa Infantry Battalion
- Conflicts: Third Italian War of Independence: Battle of Custoza; First Italo-Ethiopian War: Battle of Adwa †
- Awards: Gold Medal of Military Valor

Giuseppe Antonio Baudoin was an Italian major of the Third Italian War of Independence and the First Italo-Ethiopian War. He commanded the 9th Africa Infantry Battalion during the Battle of Adwa before being killed in the battle. He was a posthumous recipient of the Gold Medal of Military Valour for his service in the battle.

== Childhood ==
Giuseppe was born on February 25, 1843, in Nice, the son of Giovanbattista and Sabina Ciabaud. He spent his childhood within Provence and initially took interest in the natural landscapes of Provence. Since he was an only child, his parents were affectionate towards him and Giuseppe spent time within his father's industry. After Nice was annexed by France on November 18, 1860, Baudoin found a personal motivation to volunteer in the Royal Italian Army and was placed at the 19th Infantry Regiment.

== Military career ==
By June 17, 1866, he was already promoted to Second Lieutenant within the 65th Infantry Regiment. During the Third Italian War of Independence, he was given command of the Sirtori Division of the regiment and participated in the Battle of Custoza on June 24, 1866, managing to earn the Bronze Medal of Military Valor for his participation in the battle. He then participated in the Capture of Rome and around the same time, managed to rescue civilians from a fire at Grotte di Castro and for his service, was awarded the civil variant of the Silver Medal of Military Valor. Baoudoin was then transferred to the 4th Bersaglieri Infantry Regiment in July 1872. He was promoted to Lieutenant on November 1, 1874, and in January 1884, to captain within the 11th Infantry Regiment.

He was then an aide-de-camp in Brescia Brigade in September 1892 and later in December 1894, he was promoted to major and given command in the Macerata Military District. On April 26, 1895, Baudoin married Athalie Maria Hervey Brabazon on April 26, 1895. He then travelled to Eritrea and he formed the 9th African Infantry Battalion on December 15, 1895, with volunteers from the 7th, 8th and 36th infantry regiments and left Naples and landed at Massawa on January 2, 1896. Assigned to the 2nd regiment of the 1st infantry brigade under General Giuseppe Arimondi on the morning of March 1, 1896, he reached the western ridge of Monte Raio at 9.30. But after a short time, due to the withdrawal of the indigenous brigade of General Matteo Albertone, he found himself in a critical situation. The 9th Battalion, supported by Baudoin's leadership, admirably held their ground against the Shewan hordes until becoming overwhelmed by increasingly larger forces and the Battalion was annihilated along with Baudoin himself as he was shot dead.

== Medal citation ==
Baudoin was posthumously awarded the Gold Medal of Military Valour for his service in the battle. His medal citation reads:

Undaunted on the slopes of Mount Raio, he commanded the IX battalion of Africa keeping it steady to fire against enormously superior forces until it was destroyed, informed that the other troops were retreating, he replied. "It doesn't matter, we have to stay here!". And he stayed there until an enemy ball killed him. - Adua (Eritrea), March 1, 1896.
