= Edoardo Bianchini =

Italian captain (1856–1896)

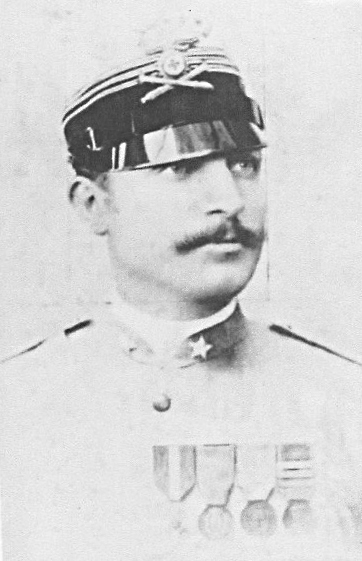
- Born: 13 October 1856; Naples, Province of Naples, Two Sicilies
- Died: 1 March 1896 (aged 39); Adwa, Tigray, Ethiopia
- Education: Nunziatella Military School
- Military career
- Allegiance: Italy
- Branch: Royal Italian Army
- Service years: 1874–1896
- Rank: Captain
- Commands: 3rd Mountain Artillery Battery
- Conflicts: First Italo-Ethiopian War: Battle of Adwa †

Edoardo Bianchini was an Italian captain of the First Italo-Ethiopian War. He commanded the 3rd Mountain Artillery Battery during the Battle of Adwa before being killed at the battle. He was also a posthumous recipient of the Gold Medal of Military Valor for his service at the battle.

== Early military career ==
He was born on 13 October 1856 in Naples as the son of Ludovico Bianchini who was an eminent jurist, economist and interior minister of the Kingdom of the Two Sicilies and of Giulia Cerrina. Eduardo was a student of the Nunziatella Military School from 1866 to 1874 and the Military Academy of Artillery and Engineers of Turin. He was appointed artillery officer and assigned first to the 13th Field Artillery Regiment and then to the Horse Artillery Regiment. After being promoted to captain, he served with the 6th and 7th Field Artillery Regiments.

He served in Eritrea for the first time from 1888 to 1894, earning the Bronze Medal of Military Valor and the Knight's Cross of the Order of the Crown of Italy. He was appointed commander of the 3rd "Sicilian" Battery and sent to Eritrea again on 16 December 1895 aboard the Singapore as a reinforcement to the units on the field, immediately after the Battle of Amba Alagi. The 4th Artillery Battery "Sicily" was also embarked on the same naval unit, under the command of Captain Umberto Masotto, and both were transferred to the Albertone Brigade.

== Battle of Adwa ==
The two artillery units, with a total of 146 officers and soldiers and 8 cannons, participated in the Battle of Mai Muret and at the Battle of Adwa. Before the latter, Bianchini was described by Lieutenant of Artillery, Giovanni Pettini di Baùso as:

I always have the heroic companions in front of my eyes: Captain Bianchini, the best of the good guys in this world, elegant as if he had to go to the Gallery at any moment [...]

At Adwa, Bianchini found himself attested on the Chidane Meret hill together with his own brigade, which had remained isolated from the rest of the Italian deployment. The Italian forces were hit by a powerful charge of the Ethiopian forces coming from Adwa, which, having defeated the vanguard, disastrously penetrated the second line. He received the order from the Brigade commander, General Matteo Albertone to "fire until the last shot and sacrifice himself on the spot to allow the brigade's leftovers to withdraw". Captain Bianchini, together with almost all the officers and effective of the two departments, met his death in the field.

Together with the commander of the Mountain Artillery Brigade, Major Francesco De Rosa and that of the 4th Battery, Captain Umberto Masotto, he was decorated with the Gold Medal of Military Valor. All the other officers, including the only two survivors (Lieutenants Pettini and Cordella, respectively wounded and taken prisoner), received the Silver Medal of Military Valor.

== Legacy ==
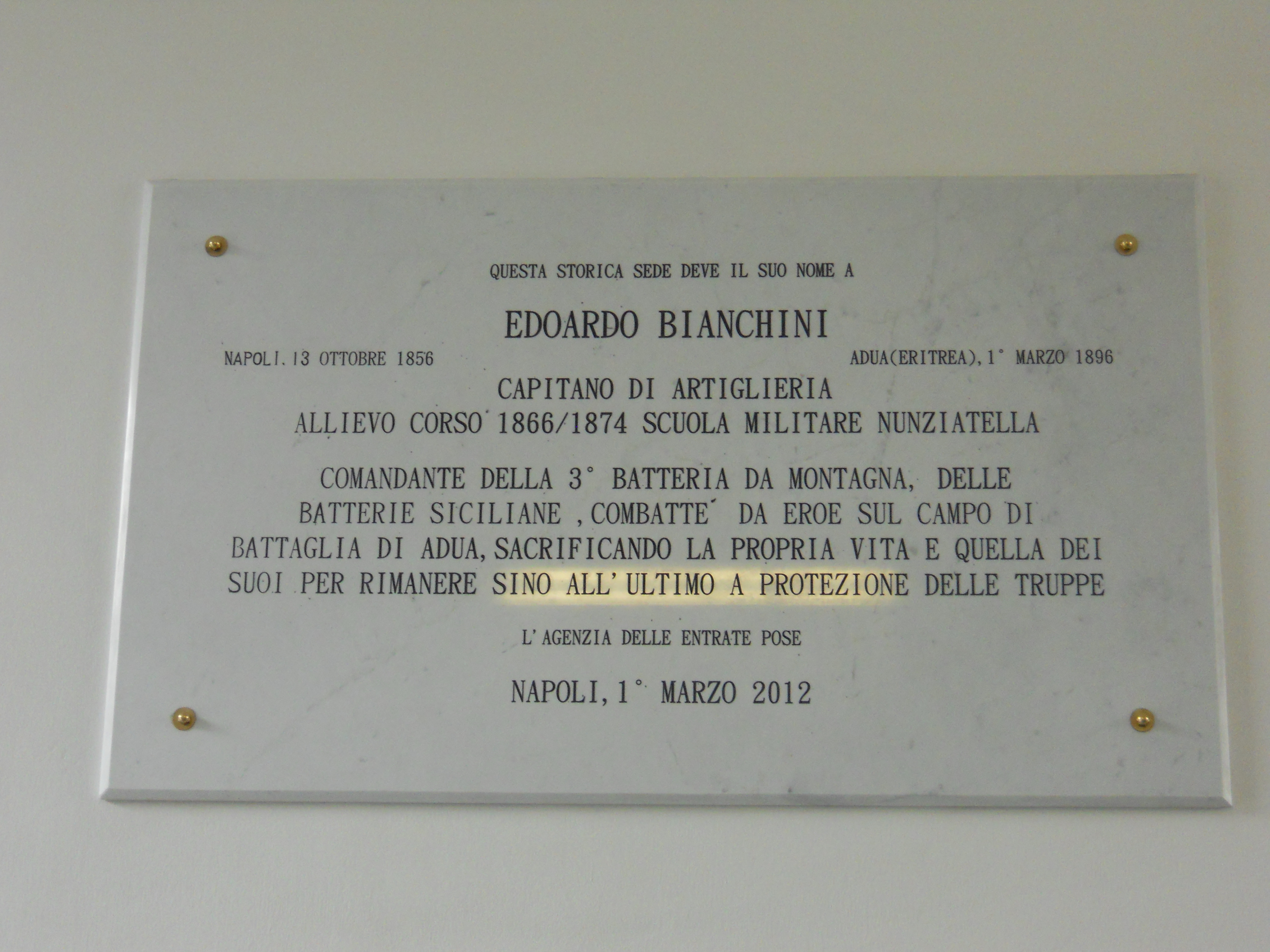
A plaque in memory of Bianchini at Naples.

Captain Bianchini is remembered, together with his fellow soldiers, with a monument built in 1899 in Messina by the sculptor Salvatore Buemi. In 1897, the ancient Bourbon Cavalry Barracks in Naples, the work of Luigi Vanvitelli located near the Maddalena bridge was also dedicated to Bianchini. On 3 March 2012, a commemorative plaque was dedicated to him in the same barracks and the former pupil of Nunziatella and historian Ferdinando Scala recalled the figure.

His Gold Medal was donated by his family to the San Martino Museum in Naples. The Nunziatella Military School named its course from 1934 to 1935 after him.

== Awards ==
- Gold Medal of Military Valor (March 1, 1896)
- Bronze Medal of Military Valor (1893)
- Order of the Crown of Italy
- Commemorative medal of the African campaigns
