= Battle of Adwa =

1896 battle of the First Italo-Ethiopian War

- Part of the First Italo-Ethiopian War
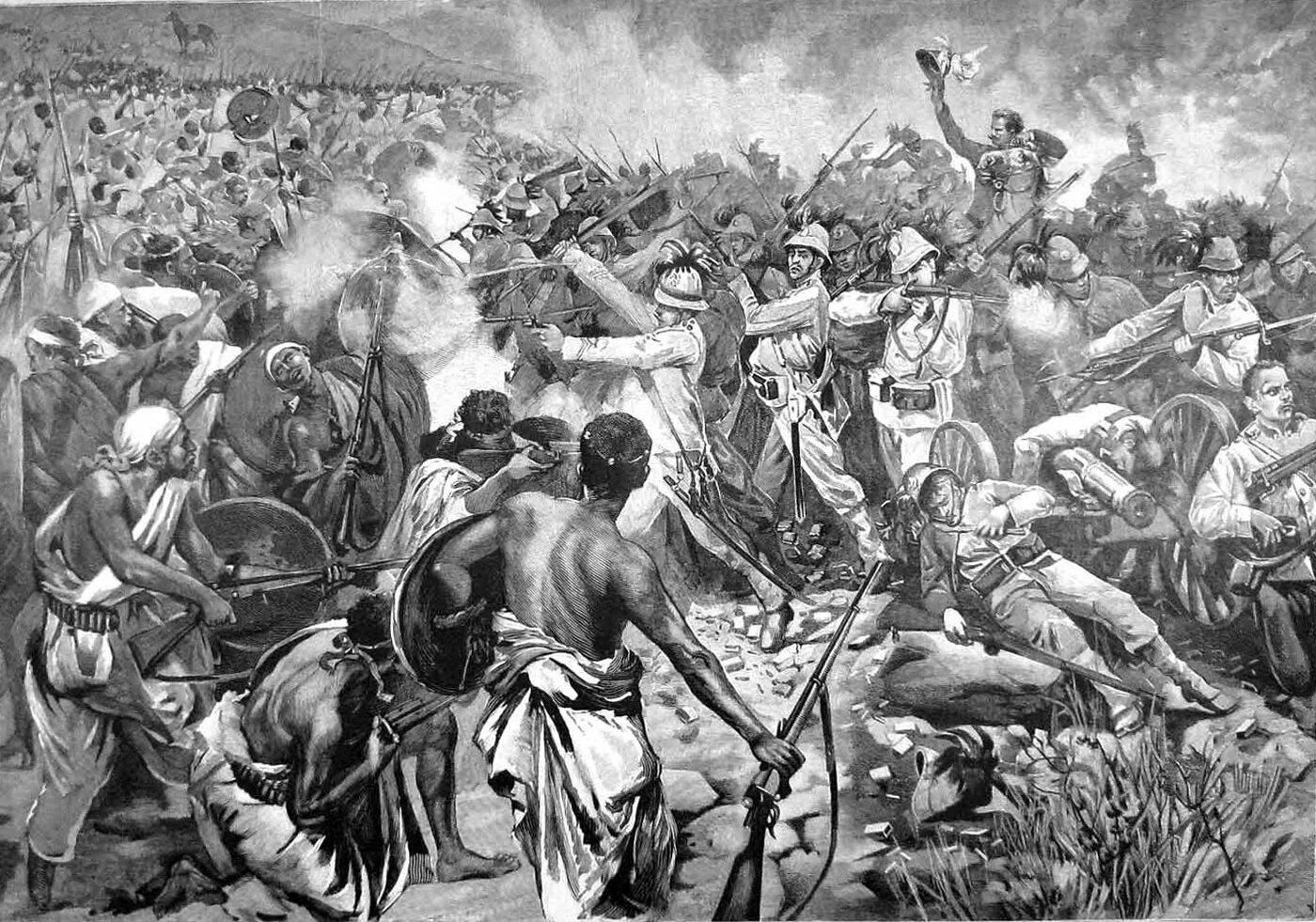
- Illustration of the battle by The Graphic
Date	1 March 1896; 130 years ago
Location	Adwa, Tigray Province, Ethiopia 14°1′8″N 38°58′24″E
Result	Ethiopian victory

Belligerents
Ethiopian Empire	Kingdom of Italy

Commanders and leaders
Menelik II; Taytu Betul; Ras Makonnen; Ras Mikael; Ras Alula; Ras Mengesha; Tekle Haymanot	Oreste Baratieri; Vittorio Dabormida †; Giuseppe Arimondi †; Giuseppe Ellena (WIA); Matteo Albertone (POW)

Strength
73,000–100,000	14,519–17,770

Casualties and losses
3,886–7,000 killed	~6,000 killed 3,865 captured
- Location within Ethiopia

The Battle of Adwa (Note: Amharic: የዐድዋ ጦርነት; Tigrinya: ውግእ ዓድዋ; Italian: battaglia di Adua. Also known as Adowa.) was the climactic battle of the First Italo-Ethiopian War. It was fought on 1 March 1896, near the town of Adwa between the Ethiopian Empire under Emperor Menelik II and an Italian colonial force led by General Oreste Baratieri.

Following a dispute over the interpretation of the Treaty of Wuchale, Italy attempted to force Ethiopia to abide by the Italian version of the treaty and impose a protectorate over Ethiopia. In response, Emperor Menelik II mobilized a massive army, with estimates ranging from 73,000 to over 100,000 men, mostly equipped with modern rifles imported from France and Russia. Facing them was a much smaller Italian colonial force under General Oreste Baratieri, which was unfamiliar with the terrain and hampered by poor reconnaissance.

Despite concerns about the size and strength of the Ethiopian forces, Baratieri, under pressure from Rome to act decisively, decided to initiate a surprise attack on the Ethiopians camped near Adwa. The Italian command advanced into difficult terrain, dividing their forces into separate columns that quickly became isolated from one another. The Ethiopians launched coordinated attacks on the dispersed Italian brigades. While the Italians initially used their artillery to slow the Ethiopian advance, their defensive positions were soon overwhelmed by sustained and numerically superior Ethiopian assaults.

The battle ended in a decisive Ethiopian victory, with over 6,000 Italian and colonial troops killed, and around 3,800 captured. Ethiopian casualties are estimated between 4,000 to 7,000 killed, and 6,000 to 10,000 wounded. The defeat forced Italy to recognize Ethiopia's sovereignty in the Treaty of Addis Ababa. Adwa resulted in the fall of the government of Francesco Crispi and secured de jure Ethiopian sovereignty until the Second Italo-Ethiopian War forty years later.

Historians often place Adwa among the most notable military reverses suffered by European powers during the Scramble for Africa. By the end of the 19th century, Ethiopia remained one of the few independent countries in Africa and the only one to owe its independence to a military victory.

== Background ==
In 1889, the Italians signed the Treaty of Wuchale with King Menelik of Shewa. The treaty, signed after the Italian occupation of Eritrea, recognized Italy's claim over the coastal colony. In it, Italy also promised to provide financial assistance and military supplies. A dispute later arose over the interpretation of the two versions of the document. In the Italian-language version, the disputed Article 17 of the treaty stated that the Emperor of Ethiopia was obliged to conduct all foreign affairs through Italian authorities, effectively making Ethiopia a protectorate of the Kingdom of Italy. The Amharic version of the article stated that the Emperor could use the good offices of the Kingdom of Italy in his relations with foreign nations if he wished. The Italian diplomats claimed that the original Amharic text included the clause and that Menelik II knowingly signed a modified copy of the Treaty.

During the 1890-96 period, the Italians pursued a twofold strategy to advance their imperial goals in Ethiopia. The first dimension, advocated mainly by the Italian Ministry of Foreign Affairs and nicknamed "politica scioana", was diplomatic, by attempting to persuade Menelik into accepting their interpretation of Article 17 and mobilising other European powers to exert pressure on the Ethiopian monarch. The second dimension, nicknamed "politica tigrigna" and pursued mostly by the Ministry of Colonies and the government of Eritrea, focused on subversive activities in Tigray, exploiting the centrifugal tendencies of provincial leaderships in Tigray and the Tigrayan resentment against the new Shewan emperor Menelik II in the hope of dismembering the country. Menelik successfully resisted both strategies. By June 1894, even the leading figures of Tigray, headed by Ras Mengesha Yohannes and Ras Alula, traveled to Addis Ababa to pay homage to the Emperor, completing his political consolidation before the military confrontation.

The Italian government decided on a military solution to force Ethiopia to abide by the Italian version of the treaty. As a result, Italy and Ethiopia came into confrontation, in what was later to be known as the First Italo-Ethiopian War. In December 1894, Bahta Hagos led a rebellion against the Italians in Akele Guzai, in what was then Italian controlled Eritrea. Units of Italian General Oreste Baratieri's army under Major Pietro Toselli crushed the rebellion and killed Bahta. In January 1895, Baratieri's army defeated Ras Mengesha Yohannes in the Battle of Coatit, forcing Mengesha to retreat further south.

By late 1895, Italian forces had advanced deep into Ethiopian territory and occupied much of Tigray. In September 1895, Menelik issued an awaj, a formal call to arms addressed to the entire Ethiopian population, mobilising the provincial forces that would form the army at Adwa. On 7 December 1895, Ras Makonnen Wolde Mikael, Fitawrari Gebeyehu and Ras Mengesha Yohannes commanding a larger Ethiopian group of Menelik's vanguard annihilated a small Italian unit at the Battle of Amba Alagi. The Italians were then forced to withdraw to more defensible positions in Tigray Province, where the two main armies faced each other. By late February 1896, supplies on both sides were running low. General Oreste Baratieri, commander of the Italian forces, knew the Ethiopian forces had been living off the land, and once the supplies of the local peasants were exhausted, Emperor Menelik II's army would begin to melt away. However, the Italian government insisted that General Baratieri act. This decision to attack rather than hold position stood in contrast to the successful tactics of General Alessandro Asinari di San Marzano, who in late March 1888 had entrenched Italian forces near Sahati and forced Emperor Yohannes IV to withdraw from Eritrea after the Ethiopian army exhausted its supplies. Baratieri knew Menelik was logistically far better prepared than Yohannes had been, while his own army was too far from Massawa to be conveniently resupplied as San Marzano had been.

The Italian journalist Adolfo Rossi, who undertook several reporting missions in the region for Corriere della Sera and witnessed major defeats such as the massacre at Amba Alagi and the Siege of Mekelle (Macallè in Italian) in January 1896, was an outspoken critic of the military-led colonial administration and its expansion into sacred Abyssinian territory – warning that it would provoke a backlash, which was soon realized through Emperor Menelik's counteroffensive. He condemned the colonial leadership as overly militaristic, driven by a thirst for medals and glory, and warned that Italian forces were overstretched, tasked with controlling an excessively large territory with too few men and inadequate logistical support. Rossi remained with General Baratieri until mid-February but was expelled just days before the Italian defeat at Adwa for his "unpatriotic" reporting, his criticism of military decisions, and his repeated warnings against engaging Menelik's vastly superior army.

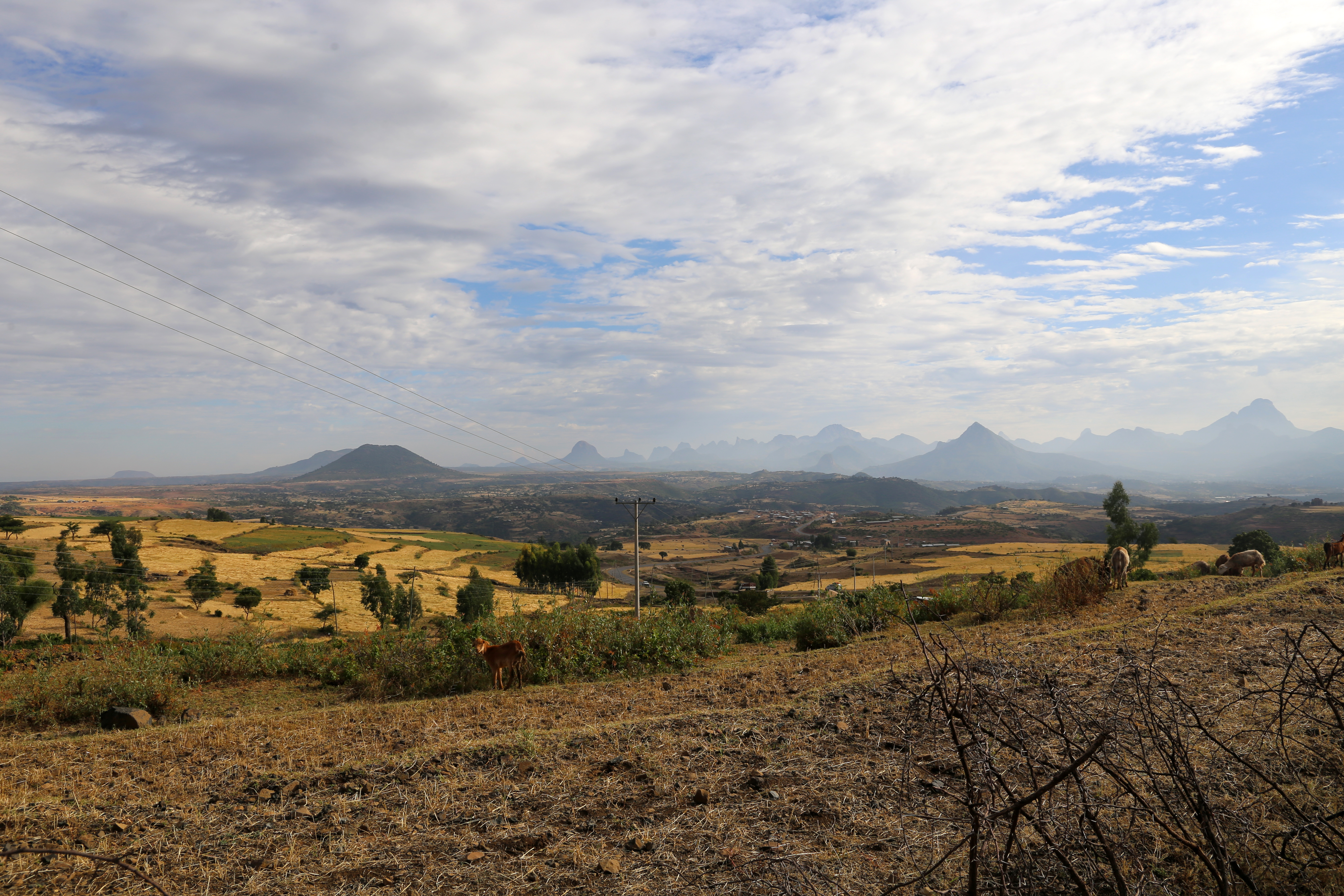
Landscape of Adwa

On the evening of 29 February, Baratieri, about to be replaced by a new governor, General Baldissera, met with his generals Matteo Albertone, Giuseppe Arimondi, Vittorio Dabormida, and Giuseppe Ellena, concerning their next steps. He opened the meeting on a negative note, revealing to his brigadiers that provisions would be exhausted in less than five days, and suggested retreating, perhaps as far back as Asmara. His subordinates argued forcefully for an attack, insisting that to retreat at this point would only worsen the poor morale. Dabormida exclaimed, "Italy would prefer the loss of two or three thousand men to a dishonorable retreat." Baratieri delayed making a decision for a few more hours, claiming that he needed to wait for some last-minute intelligence, but in the end announced that the attack would start the next morning at 9:00am. His troops began their march to their starting positions shortly after midnight.

== Order of battle ==
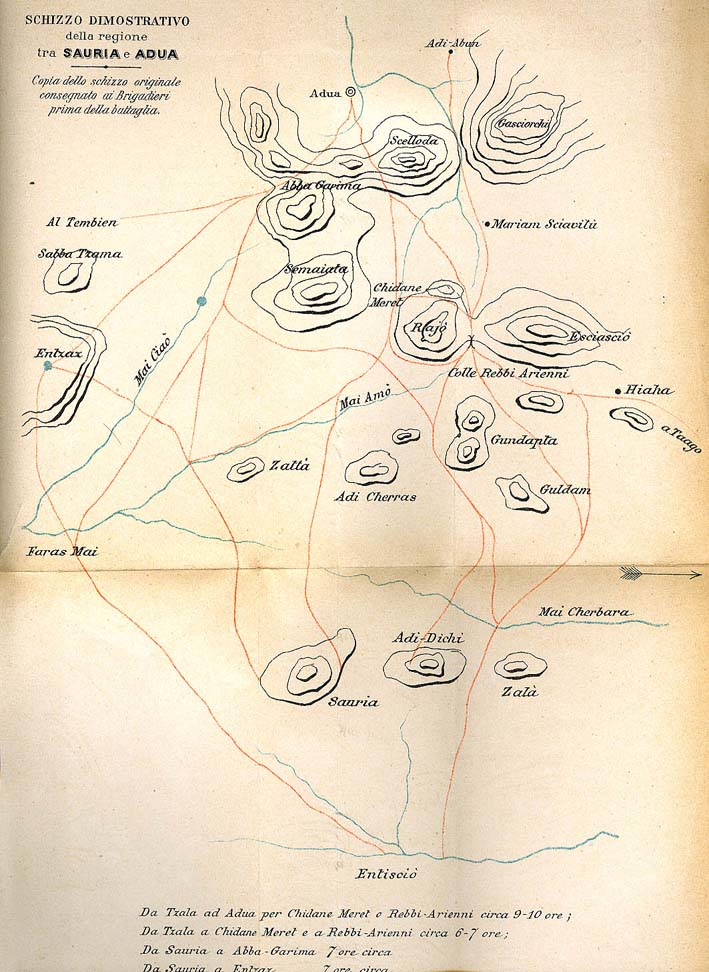
An 1890s Italian map of Adwa. A small arrow indicates that north is to the right.

=== Ethiopian forces ===
- Shewa; Negus Negasti Menelik II: 25,000 rifles / 3,000 horses / 32 guns
- Semien; Itaghiè Taytu: 3,000 rifles / 600 horses / 4 guns
- Gojjam; Negus Tekle Haymanot: 5,000 rifles
- Harar; Ras Makonnen: 15,000 rifles
- Tigray; Ras Mengesha Yohannes and Ras Alula: 12,000 rifles / 6 guns
- Wollo; Ras Mikael: 6,000 rifles / 5,000 horses
- Gondar; Ras Olié: 8,000 rifles
- Lasta; Wagshum Guangul: 6,000 rifles
- In addition there were ~20,000 spearmen and swordsmen as well as an unknown number of armed peasants.

Estimates for the Ethiopian forces under Menelik range from a low of 73,000 to a high of over 100,000 outnumbering the Italians by an estimated five times. The forces were divided among Emperor Menelik, Empress Taytu Betul, Ras Welle Betul, Ras Mengesha Atikem, Ras Mengesha Yohannes, Ras Alula Engida (Abba Nega), Ras Mikael of Wollo, Ras Makonnen Wolde Mikael, Fitawrari Habte Giyorgis, Fitawrari Gebeyyehu, and Negus Tekle Haymanot Tessemma.

Pétridè, as well as Pankhurst, with slight variations, break the troop numbers down (over 100,000 by their estimates) as follows: 35,000 infantry (25,000 riflemen and 10,000 spearmen) and 8,000 cavalry under Emperor Menelik; 5,000 infantry under Empress Taytu; 8,000 infantry (6,000 riflemen and 2,000 spearmen) under Ras Wale; 8,000 infantry (5,000 riflemen and 3,000 spearmen) under Ras Mengesha Atikem, 12,000 riflemen, 5,000 spearmen, and 3,000 cavalry under Ras Mengesha Yohannes and Ras Alula Engida; 6,000 riflemen, 5,000 spearmen, and 5,000 Oromo cavalry under Ras Mikael of Wollo; 15,000 riflemen under Ras Makonnen; 8,000 infantry under Fitawrari Gebeyyehu Gora; 5,000 riflemen, 5,000 spearmen, and 3,000 cavalry under Negus Tekle Haymanot of Gojjam.

The armies were followed by a similar number of camp followers who supplied the army, as had been done for centuries. Most of the army consisted of riflemen, a significant percentage of whom were in Menelik's reserve. There were also a significant number of cavalry and infantry only armed with lances, the latter referred to as "lancer servants".

=== Italian forces ===
Immediately before the battle of Adwa, the Italian army in East Africa numbered around 29,700 men. However, as Harold Marcus notes, "several thousand" soldiers were needed in support roles and to guard the lines of communication to the rear. He accordingly estimates that the Italian force at Adwa consisted of just 14,519 effective combat troops. In contrast, David Levering Lewis estimates that the Italian army consisted of four brigades, totaling 17,770 troops with fifty-six artillery pieces. (Note: Lewis breaks down their numbers into 10,596 Italian officers and soldiers and 7,104 Eritrean askaris) The Italian force was organized into four brigades. General Matteo Albertone's left column comprised four indigenous battalions and four artillery batteries. General Giuseppe Arimondi's centre column consisted of five white battalions, one indigenous battalion and two batteries. General Vittorio Dabormida's right column included six white battalions, four militia battalions and two batteries. In reserve, General Giuseppe Ellena commanded six white battalions, one indigenous battalion and two rapid-fire batteries.

Unlike most other European armies during the Scramble for Africa, the Italian army at Adwa primarily consisted of white European troops. While these included elite Bersaglieri and Alpini units, a large proportion of the troops were inexperienced conscripts recently drafted from metropolitan regiments in Italy into newly formed "d'Africa" battalions for service in Africa. Additionally, a limited number of troops were from the Cacciatori d'Africa; units permanently serving in Africa and in part recruited from Italian settlers.

According to historian Chris Prouty:

They [the Italians] had inadequate maps, old-model guns, poor communication equipment and inferior footgear for the rocky ground. (The newer Carcano Model 91 rifles were not issued because Baratieri, under constraints to be economical, wanted to use up the old cartridges). Morale was low as the veterans were homesick and the newcomers were too inexperienced to have any esprit de corps. There was a shortage of mules and saddles.

The Italian operational corps in Eritrea was under the command of General Oreste Baratieri. The chief of staff was Lieutenant Colonel Gioacchino Valenzano.

- Right column: (4,833 rifles / 18 cannons) 2nd Infantry Brigade (Gen. Vittorio Dabormida);
  - 3rd Africa Infantry Regiment, (Col. Ottavio Ragni)
    - 5th Africa Infantry Battalion (Maj. Luigi Giordano)
    - 6th Africa Infantry Battalion (Maj. Leopoldo Prato)
    - 10th Africa Infantry Battalion (Maj. Gennaro De Fonseca)
  - 6th Africa Infantry Regiment (Col. Cesare Airaghi)
    - 3rd Africa Infantry Battalion (Maj. Luigi Branchi)
    - 13th Africa Infantry Battalion (Maj. Alberto Rayneri)
    - 14th Africa Infantry Battalion (Maj. Secondo Solaro)
  - Native Mobile Militia Battalion (Maj. Lodovico De Vito)
  - Native Company from the Asmara Chitet (Cpt. Alberto Sermasi)
  - 2nd Artillery Brigade (Maj. Alberto Zola)
    - 5th Mountain Artillery Battery (Cpt. Giuseppe Mottino)
    - 6th Mountain Artillery Battery (Cpt. Giuseppe Regazzi)
    - 7th Mountain Artillery Battery (Cpt. Vittorio Gisla)
- Central column: (3,324 rifles / 12 cannons) 1st Infantry Brigade (Gen. Giuseppe Arimondi);
  - 1st Africa Bersaglieri Regiment (Col. Francesco Stevani)
    - 1st Africa Bersaglieri Battalion (Maj. Matteo De Stefano)
    - 2nd Africa Bersaglieri Battalion (Maj. Lorenzo Compiano)
  - 1st Africa Infantry Regiment (Col. Ugo Brusati)
    - 2nd Africa Infantry Battalion (Maj. Flaciano Viancini)
    - 4th Africa Infantry Battalion (Maj. Luigi De Amicis)
    - 9th Africa Infantry Battalion (Maj. Giuseppe Baudoin)
  - 1st Company of the 5th Native Battalion (Cpt. Pietro Pavesi)
  - 8th Mountain Artillery Battery (Cpt. Vincenzo Loffredo)
  - 11th Mountain Artillery Battery (Cpt. Giocanni Franzini)
- Left column: (4,339 rifles / 14 cannons) Native Brigade (Gen. Matteo Albertone);
  - 1st Native Battalion (Maj. Domenico Turitto)
  - 6th Native Battalion (Maj. Giuseppe Cossu)
  - 5th Native Battalion (Maj. Rodolfo Valli)
  - 8th Native Battalion (Maj. Giocanni Gamerra)
  - "Okulè Kusai" Native Irregular Company (Lt. Alessandro Sapelli)
  - 1st Artillery Brigade (Maj. Francesco De Rosa)
    - 1st Native Mountain Artillery Battery (Cpt. Clemente Henry)
    - 2nd Section of the 2nd Native Mountain Artillery Battery (Lt. Arnaldo Vibi)
    - 3rd Mountain Artillery Battery (Cpt. Edoardo Bianchini)
    - 4th Mountain Artillery Battery (Cpt. Umberto Masotto)
- Reserve column: (3,032 rifles /12 cannons) 3rd Infantry Brigade (Gen. Giuseppe Ellena);
  - 4th Africa Infantry Regiment (Col. Giovanni Romero)
    - 7th Africa Infantry Battalion (Maj. Alberto Montecchi)
    - 8th Africa Infantry Battalion (Maj. Achille Violante)
    - 11th Africa Infantry Battalion (Maj. Sebastiano Manfredi)
    - 12th Africa Infantry Battalion (Maj. Rinaldo Amatucci)
  - 5th Africa Infantry Regiment (Col. Luigi Nava)
    - 15th Africa Infantry Battalion (Maj. Achille Ferraro)
    - 16th Africa Infantry Battalion (Maj. Bugenio Vandiol)
    - 1st Africa Alpini Battalion (Lt. Col. Davide Menini)
  - 3rd Native Battalion (Lt. Col. Giuseppe Galliano)
  - 1st Quick Fire Artillery Battery (Cpt. Giovanni Aragno)
  - 2nd Quick Fire Artillery Battery (Cpt. Domencio Mangia)
  - Sappers company

Budget restrictions and supply shortages meant that many of the rifles and artillery pieces issued to the Italian reinforcements sent to Africa were obsolete models, while clothing and other equipment was often substandard. The logistics and training of the recently arrived conscript contingents from Italy were inferior to the experienced colonial troops based in Eritrea.

== Battle ==
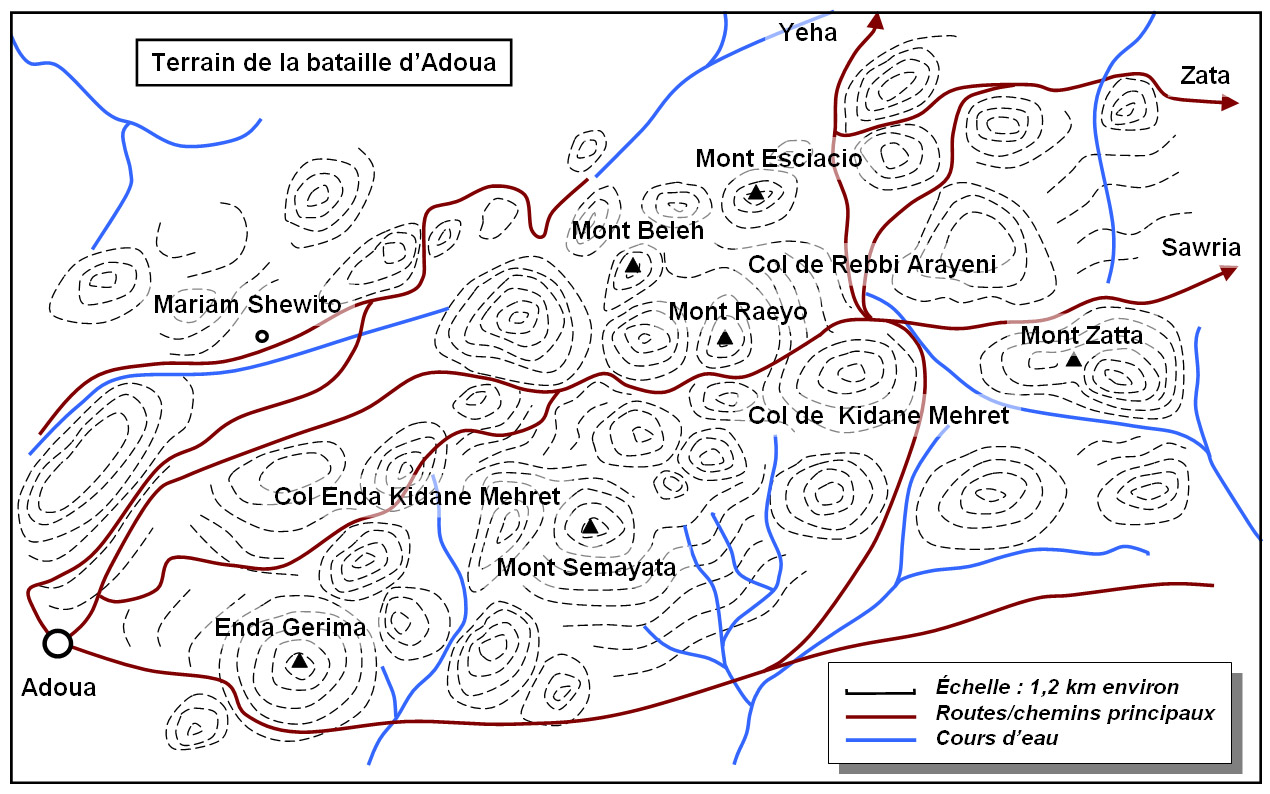
Terrain of the battle of Adwa

Around 9 p.m. on the 27th, in accordance with the orders of General Oreste Baratieri, the columns of Vittorio Dabormida, Giuseppe Arimondi, and Matteo Albertone advanced toward the Ethiopian positions; the reserve column of Giuseppe Ellena followed an hour later. The moonlight favored the march of the columns. David Levering Lewis states that the Italian battle plan called for three columns to march in parallel formation to the crests of three mountains – Dabormida commanding on the right, Albertone on the left, and Arimondi in the center – with a reserve under Ellena following behind Arimondi. The supporting crossfire each column could give the others made the 'soldiers as deadly as razored shears'. Albertone's brigade was to set the pace for the others. He was to position himself on the summit known as Kidane Mehret, which would give the Italians the high ground from which to meet the Ethiopians.

The first Italian error was made by Albertone: instead of continuing west toward the Kidane Mehret Pass, he veered north toward the Rebbi Arayeni Pass around 2:30 a.m. Having reached the Kidane Mehret Pass around 3:30 a.m., the column paused there for half an hour before resuming its march at a very brisk pace toward Enda Kidane Mehret. This latter movement, which had not been ordered, was likely caused by confusion arising from the information on the map, which was based on local accounts. Although the Kidane Mehret Pass was marked on this map, there was in fact a pass called Enda Kidane Mehret further west; trusting the local guides more, Albertone allowed himself to be led as far as Mount Abba Gerima. When he became aware of this confusion, Albertone found himself cut off from the rest of the Italian army.

At the start of the day, an Ethiopian informant, Awalom of Enticho, working as an interpreter for Baratieri, reported to Ras Alula the movements of Italian troops. Alula promptly informed the commanders of the imperial army facing General Albertone. The columns of Tekle Haymanot, Ras Mikael, Ras Makonnen, Ras Olie, and Wagshum Guangal joined the battle. Emperor Menelik, praying at the Church of St. George with Abuna Mattheos X, was not present at the start of the fighting.

=== Initial clashes ===
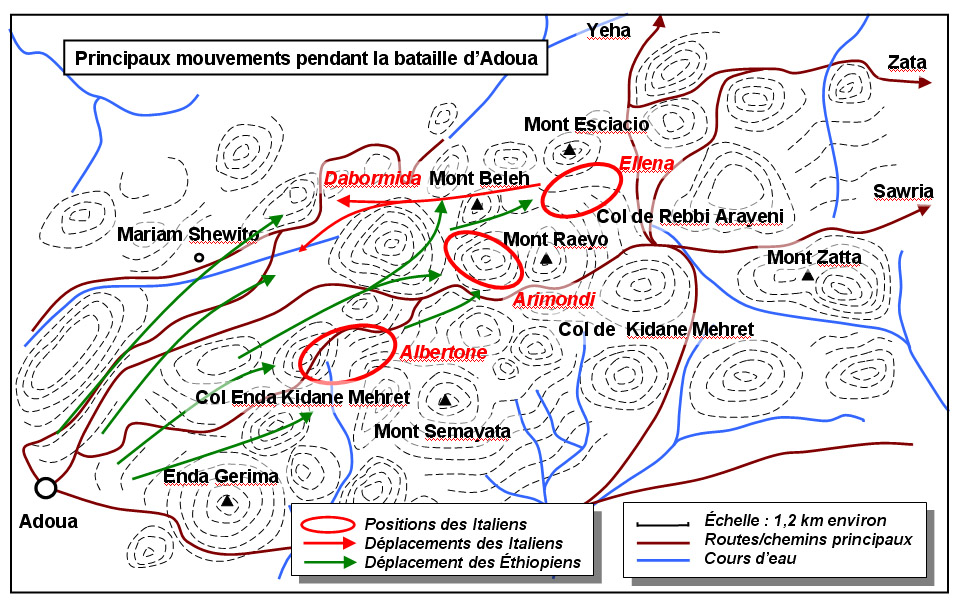
Italian movements during the battle

Around 6:00 a.m., Albertone's vanguard, the 1st Indigenous Battalion under Major Domenico Turitto, approached the enemy outposts near the church of Enda Mikael near Adwa, it was ferociously charged by Ethiopian units coming from the Enda Garima and Gessoso mountains; the charge was so violent that it also hit the second Italian line, forcing Albertone to retreat from Kidane Meret to re-establish himself on the western slopes of Mount Semaiata. Two mountain batteries remained on site, commanded by Edoardo Bianchini and Umberto Masotto, with orders to resist to the last man. Both batteries were captured, and the two commanders were killed. Faced with the offensives on his left flank, Albertone committed the reserve regiment, managing to push back the Ethiopians by about 1 km. At 8 a.m., the forces of Menelik and Taytu finally arrived at the battle, however his forces remained in reserve.

Baratieri tried desperately to call back the Eritrean Ascaris of Albertone, but his messages were unable to reach him. Baratieri then ordered the brigade led by Dabormida to move southwest to support Albertone's brigade and the Arimondi brigade to also turn left towards Mount Rajo. General Dabormida, in an attempt to relieve the pressure on Albertone, pushed his brigade into the deep valley of Mariam Shewito, where it moved toward the right flank, directly away from where it was supposed to go, and a gap of about two miles opened between it and the rest of the army. Ras Makonnen lunged forward into the opening, cutting off Dabormida's brigade from the rest of the Italian army.

Despite their isolated position, Albertone's askaris held their positions for over two hours, with the artillery under Major Francesco De Rosa inflicting heavy casualties on the attackers. Faced with the offensives suffered on his left flank, Albertone committed the reserve regiment, managing to push back the Ethiopians by about 1 km. Fitawrari Gebeyehu, noting the reluctance of his troops to fight, decided to make a frontal charge on the Italian positions. After having "fought heroically", he was killed by a machine gun at the foot of Enda Kidane Mehret, which caused his men to retreat and greatly boosted the morale of Albertone's men. Deeply shaken by these losses, Menelik contemplated on ordering a retreat, but Empress Taytu and Ras Mangasha convinced him to unleash his reserve of 25,000 men. Menelik ordered his guard to attack the Italians frontally while Taytu's troops attacked the right and Ras Mikael's troops attacked on the left. At 8:30 a.m. Albertone's brigade, now being outflanked, began a fighting retreat that soon turned into a rout. The batteries that tried to cover the withdrawal were captured and Major De Rosa was killed. The askaris fled toward the positions held by Arimondi's brigade around Mount Belah. Albertone, whose mule was hit by a bullet, was captured and taken prisoner.

=== Italian center ===
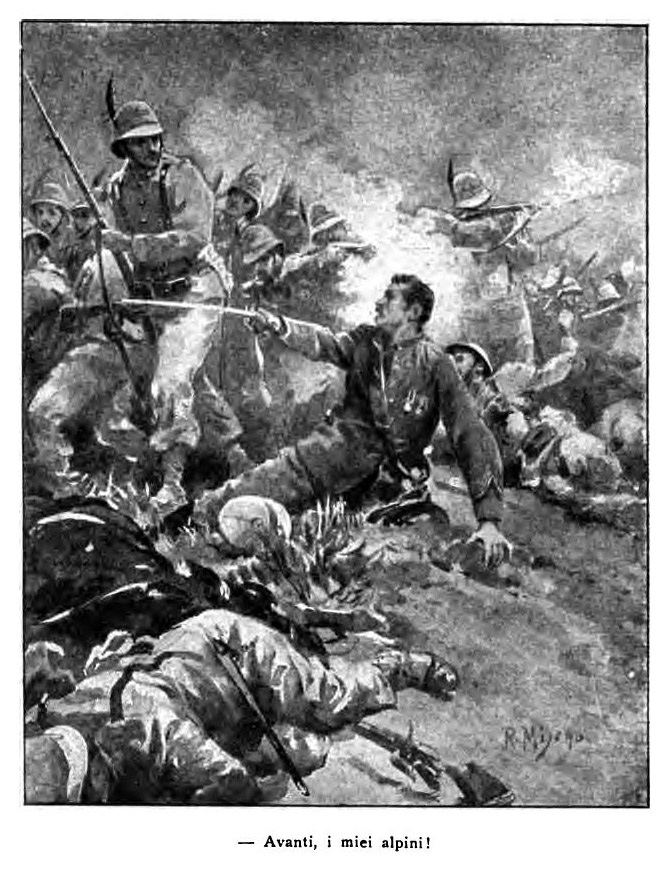
A mortally wounded Lieutenant Colonel Davide Menini urges the Alpini troops to advance

After the rout of Albertone's brigade, the Ethiopian columns descended on Arimondi's position, immediately engaging the Italians in fierce fighting. The Ethiopians split into two columns, one attacking Mount Belah on the Italian right, held by Colonel Francesco Stevani's Bersaglieri, while the other attacked the junction between Mount Rajo and the Chidane Meret on the Italian left, held by Colonel Giuseppe Galliano's III Native Battalion, which had been detached from the Ellena brigade. All while putting significant pressure on Arimondi's central positions.

The Ethiopian column on the left, composed of 25,000 men from the Shewan units and part of Menelik's bodyguard, unexpectedly occupied a rocky spur (called Zebàn Daarò) to the northwest of Mount Belah, thus outflanking Arimondi's right flank. Colonel Stevani tried to re-establish the situation by sending two companies of Bersaglieri to recapture the spur, but only 40 men managed to scale the rock face and were swept away by the overwhelming numbers of the enemy. On the far left, the 3rd Indigenous Battalion commanded by Lieutenant Colonel Giuseppe Galliano also collapsed under intense pressure. Galliano attempted unsuccessfully to rally his men and maintain order. Of the battalion's twenty-three officers, ten were killed, and only about three hundred soldiers survived. According to eyewitness accounts, Galliano was captured and executed by Ethiopian troops.

Baratieri tried to prevent this outflanking maneuver by ordering reinforcements from General Giuseppe Ellena's reserve brigade, unaware that only five of the twenty-four companies were available, since for over an hour the Ellena brigade had been engaged in dealing with attacks of small bands of Ethiopians who managed to bypass Mount Belah and appeared behind the Italian contingent. Despite this, Ellena tried to plug the gap on the left flank by sending the 5th Infantry Regiment led by Colonel Luigi Nava, which also included an Alpini battalion under Davide Menini, but they were completely overwhelmed by the advance of the enemy units. Colonel Nava was wounded and captured during the fighting.

Pressed at the front and outflanked on both flanks, the Arimondi brigade gave way at around 12:00. Baratieri then ordered a general retreat in the direction of Adi Ugri and Adi Keyh. The retreat was poorly coordinated, as orders could not reach the broken line, and only a few units maintained discipline. As the army dissolved into a fleeing mass, the Oromo cavalry under Ras Mikael charged forward, cutting down the retreating Italians and causing widespread panic. The rapid advance of the Ethiopians only allowed for the organization of a rearguard of barely one hundred Alpini led by Captain Pietro Cella, which was annihilated but gave time for the rest of the army to retreat. Between 2:30 and 3:00 p.m., Colonel Ugo Brusati built a rearguard on a height between Yeha and Kokma to fend off the pursuing Ethiopians, the Italian retreat continued until 3:00 a.m. on the next day.

=== Mariam Shewito Valley ===
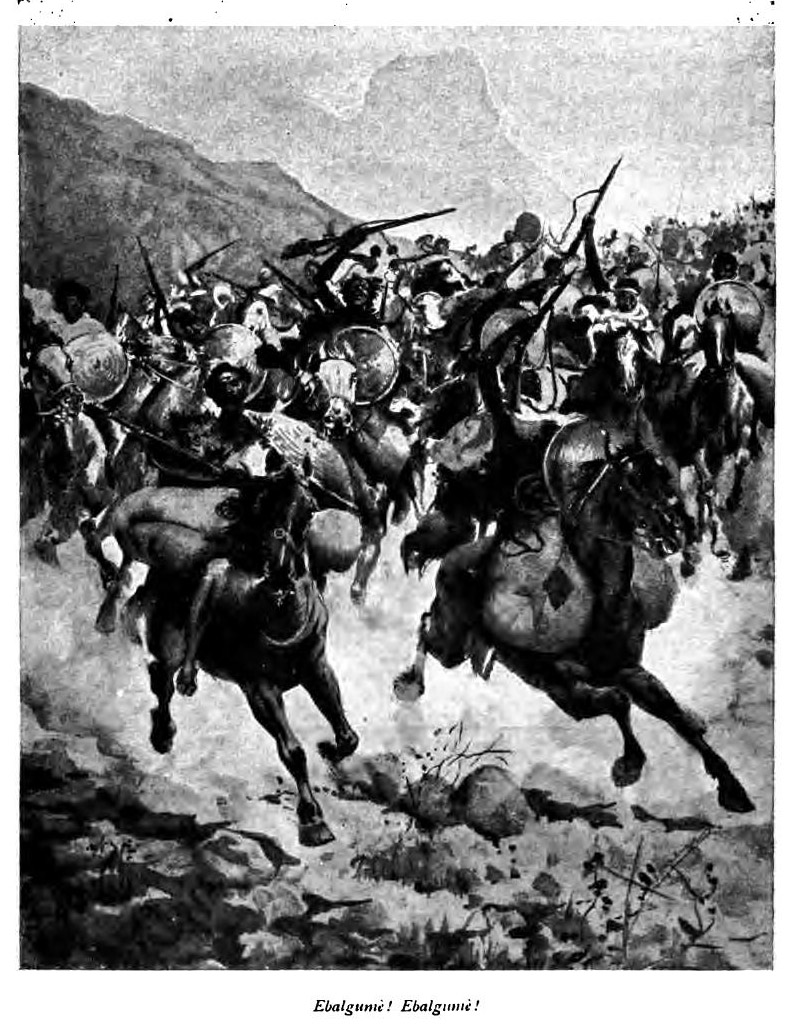
Charge of the Oromo cavalry

At the start of the battle, Dabormida positioned himself near Mariam Shewito, accompanied by the indigenous battalion led by Major Lodovico De Vito where they encountered the men of Ras Makonnen. The indigenous troops were the first to engage, followed by the rest of the brigade. The general launched an attack on three fronts: Cesare Airaghi's regiment in the valley, Ottavio Ragni's regiment on the hill, Alberto Rayneri and Luigi De Amicis's battalions in the rear. Dabormida's troops repelled four attacks of Ras Makonnen's men, but this did little to prevent the Ethiopians from routing the Native Brigade led by Albertone. At this point, the Shewan troops under Menelik split into two columns: one continued toward Bellah to outflank the exposed flank of the Arimondi Brigade, while the other turned left to attack the now isolated Dabormida Brigade.

At approximately 10:00 a.m., De Vito's indigenous battalion, which was struggling to find ammunition, came under intense Ethiopian fire and was rapidly overwhelmed. The retreat of the indigenous troops soon degenerated into a rout, which alarmed nearby Italian units. By around 11:00 a.m., the Dabormida Brigade faced increasing pressure from Ethiopian forces, especially from cavalry contingents of the elite Oromo cavalry. Initially, the brigade experienced only limited fighting because the main Ethiopian effort was concentrated against the brigades of Generals Arimondi and Ellena. This temporary lull led many Italian officers and soldiers to believe that victory remained possible. Although wounded, Dabormida reportedly remained optimistic, and morale within the brigade was still relatively high.

At approximately 1:00 p.m., Dabormida sent a message to General Baratieri to inform him of the "good situation" he believed he was in. Unbeknownst to him, Baratieri's forces were already in retreat and the message never managed to reach him. Meanwhile, Ethiopian troops that had defeated the brigades of Ellena and Arimondi were moving into the valley, progressively encircling Dabormida's position. As the situation deteriorated, Dabormida recognized that his brigade had advanced along an incorrect route. Rather than immediately withdrawing, he attempted to maintain the initiative. The brigade had become dangerously extended along the valley, making coordinated movement increasingly difficult. At this point, Dabormida informed Colonel Airaghi that he intended to launch a final attack, hoping either to gain time or secure reinforcements. Airaghi reportedly expressed skepticism, but Dabormida explained that the attack might at least create space for an orderly withdrawal.

Under the cry of "Forward, Savoy!" the brigade then launched its final assault. Although some Ethiopian units gave ground, the Italian charge was repulsed with heavy losses and Airaghi was mortally wounded during the fighting. A retreat was ordered, with instructions to maintain discipline and cohesion. However, as the troops attempted to withdraw toward the mouth of the valley, they encountered large numbers of Ethiopian forces occupying the surrounding plain. The brigade found itself effectively encircled. The withdrawal route toward the Erarà heights remained open largely due to the actions of Lieutenant Rayneri's company, which successfully repelled repeated Ethiopian attacks and secured the pass leading to the hill, enabling many Italian survivors to escape. Dabormida disappeared during the final stages of the battle. The circumstances of his death remain unclear. The Battle of Adwa thus ended with the fall of Dabormida's column. The following day, on 2 March 1896, at about nine o'clock, General Baratieri arrived at Adi Keyh and sent a telegram to Rome informing the government of Francesco Crispi of the Italian defeat.

== Immediate aftermath ==
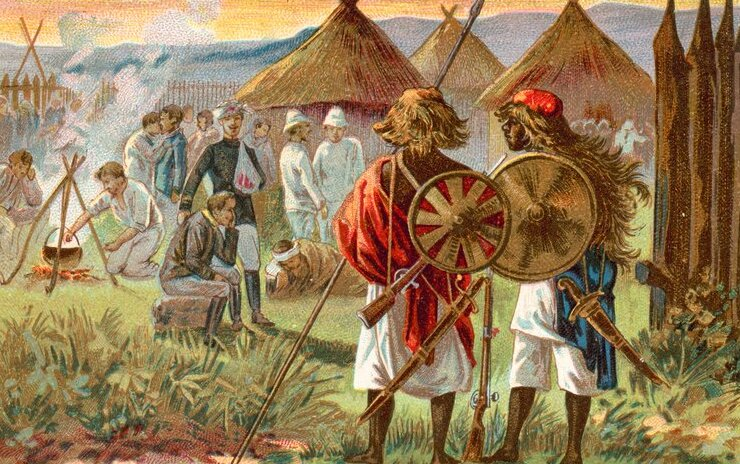
Italian prisoners in Ethiopia

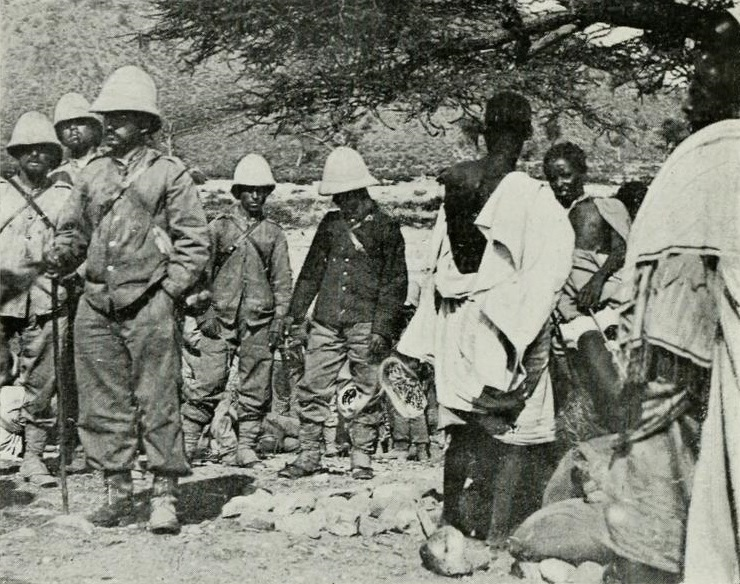
Italian prisoners of war in Harar, March 1897

George Berkeley records that the Italian casualties were 6,133 men killed: 261 officers, 2,918 white NCOs and privates, with 954 permanently missing, and about 2,000 ascari dead. Another 1,428 were wounded – 470 Italians (including 31 officers) and 958 ascari. 1,865 Italians and 2,000 ascaris were taken prisoner. Richard Caulk estimates that the number of Italians killed were 300 officers, 4,600 Italian rank, and 1,000 askari for a total of 5,900 dead. 1,000 escaped wounded and at least 2,000 were captured. Citing contemporary figures, Caulk records Ethiopian losses to be 3,886 killed and 6,000 wounded. Berkeley estimates Ethiopian losses to be 7,000 killed and 10,000 wounded.

In their desperate flight to Eritrea, the Italians left behind all of their artillery and 11,000 rifles, and most of their transport. As Paul B. Henze notes, "Baratieri's army had been completely annihilated while Menelik's was intact as a fighting force and gained thousands of rifles and a great deal of equipment from the fleeing Italians." Despite this victory, the Ethiopian forces withdrew because Menelik did not wish to risk an offensive aimed at driving the Italians out of Eritrea. Ras Alula Engida, however, favored pursuing the invaders northward and expelling them permanently from the Eritrean colony. Menelik feared that Italy might dispatch a larger force than the one defeated at the Battle of Adwa; moreover, the Italian positions in Asmara and Massawa appeared too well fortified for further offensives. The imperial army, described as "at the end of its rope," could not sustain further campaigning in Eritrea. The historian Carlo Conti Rossini even argued that, had the war continued for two more weeks, the Ethiopians would have been defeated.

800 captured Eritrean Ascari, regarded as traitors by the Ethiopians, had their right hands and left feet amputated. Augustus Wylde records that when he visited the battlefield months after the battle, the pile of severed hands and feet was still visible, "a rotting heap of ghastly remnants." Many mutilated Ascari did not survive. Wylde wrote how the neighborhood of Adwa "was full of their freshly dead bodies; they had generally crawled to the banks of the streams to quench their thirst, where many of them lingered unattended and exposed to the elements until death put an end to their sufferings."

Despite some instances of abuse (including possibly some instances of castration), the Italian prisoners were generally treated better by the Ethiopians. Among the prisoners was General Albertone. Chris Prouty notes that Albertone was given into the care of Azaj Zamanel, commander of Empress Taytu's personal army, and "had a tent to himself, a horse and servants". However, around 70 Italian prisoners were massacred in retaliation for the death of Bashah Aboye. The officer responsible for the massacre was reportedly imprisoned by Menelik.

Public opinion in Italy was outraged. Chris Prouty offers a panoramic overview of the response in Italy to the news:

When news of the calamity reached Italy there were street demonstrations in most major cities. In Rome, to prevent these violent protests, the universities and theatres were closed. Police were called out to disperse rock-throwers in front of Prime Minister Crispi's residence. Crispi resigned on 9 March. Troops were called out to quell demonstrations in Naples. In Pavia, crowds built barricades on the railroad tracks to prevent a troop train from leaving the station. The Association of Women of Rome, Turin, Milan and Pavia called for the return of all military forces in Africa. Funeral masses were intoned for the known and unknown dead. Families began sending to the newspapers letters they had received before Adwa in which their menfolk described their poor living conditions and their fears at the size of the army they were going to face. King Umberto declared his birthday (14 March) a day of mourning. Italian communities in St. Petersburg, London, New York, Chicago, Buenos Aires and Jerusalem collected money for the families of the dead and for the Italian Red Cross.

== Aftermath ==
Emperor Menelik decided not to follow up on his victory by attempting to drive the routed Italians out of their colony. The victorious Emperor limited his demands to little more than the abrogation of the Treaty of Wuchale. In the context of the prevailing balance of power, the emperor's crucial goal was to preserve Ethiopian independence. In addition, Ethiopia had just begun to emerge from a long and brutal famine; Harold Marcus reminds us that the army was restive over its long service in the field, short of rations, and the short rains which would bring all travel to a crawl would soon start to fall.

At the time, Menelik claimed a shortage of cavalry horses with which to harry the fleeing soldiers. Chris Prouty observes that "a failure of nerve on the part of Menelik has been alleged by both Italian and Ethiopian sources." Lewis believes that it "was his farsighted certainty that total annihilation of Baratieri and a sweep into Eritrea would force the Italian people to turn a bungled colonial war into a national crusade" that stayed his hand.

As a direct result of the battle, Italy signed the Treaty of Addis Ababa, recognizing Ethiopia as an independent state. Almost forty years later, on 3 October 1935, after the League of Nations's weak response to the Abyssinia Crisis, the Italians launched a new military campaign endorsed by Benito Mussolini, the Second Italo-Ethiopian War. This time the Italians employed vastly superior military technology such as tanks and aircraft, as well as chemical warfare, and the Ethiopian forces were defeated by May 1936. Following the war, Italy occupied Ethiopia for five years (1936–41), before eventually being driven out during World War II by British Empire forces and Ethiopian Arbegnoch guerillas.

== Significance ==
"The confrontation between Italy and Ethiopia at Adwa was a fundamental turning point in Ethiopian history," writes Henze. On a similar note, the Ethiopian historian Bahru Zewde observed that "few events in the modern period have brought Ethiopia to the attention of the world as has the victory at Adwa". This defeat of a colonial power and the ensuing recognition of African sovereignty became rallying points for later African nationalists during their struggle for decolonization, as well as activists and leaders of the Pan-African movement. As the scholar Richard Pankhurst explains,

The battle of Adwa, which was thereafter celebrated annually, left the Ethiopians with immense pride. It led them to believe that they were virtually invincible, and could resist any European enemy, however strong. The outcome of the battle at the same time gave Ethiopia a unique position in Africa. The victory made the country, in the eyes of many Africans, then and, more especially a generation or so later, a beacon of independence in a continent almost entirely enslaved by European colonialism.

On the other hand, many writers have pointed out how this battle was a humiliation for the Italian military. Italian historian Tripodi argued that some of the roots of the rise of Fascism in Italy went back to this defeat and to the perceived need to "avenge" the defeat that started to be present in the military and nationalistic groups of the Kingdom of Italy. The same Mussolini declared when Italian troops occupied Addis Ababa in May 1936: Adua è vendicata (Adwa has been avenged).

One student of Ethiopia's History, Donald N. Levine, points out that for the Italians Adwa "became a national trauma which demagogic leaders strove to avenge. It also played no little part in motivating Italy's revanchist adventure in 1935". Levine also noted that the victory "gave encouragement to isolationist and conservative strains that were deeply rooted in Ethiopian culture, strengthening the hand of those who would strive to keep Ethiopia from adopting techniques imported from the modern West – resistances with which both Menelik and Haile Selassie would have to contend".

== Present-day celebrations of Adwa ==
=== Public holiday ===
The Adwa Victory Day is a public holiday in all regional states and charter cities across Ethiopia. All schools, banks, post offices and government offices are closed, with the exceptions of health facilities. Some taxi services and public transports choose not to operate on this day. Shops are normally open but most close earlier than usual.

=== Public celebrations ===
The Victory of Adwa, being a public holiday, is commemorated in public spaces. In Addis Ababa, the Victory of Adwa is celebrated at Menelik Square with the presence of government officials, patriots, foreign diplomats and the general public. The Ethiopian Police Orchestra play various patriotic songs as they walk around Menelik Square.

The public dress up in traditional Ethiopian patriotic attire. Men often wear Jodhpurs and various types of vest; they carry the Ethiopian flag and various patriotic banners and placards, as well as traditional Ethiopian shields and swords called Shotel. Women dress up in different patterns of handcrafted traditional Ethiopian clothing, known in Amharic as Habesha kemis. Some wear black gowns over all, while others put royal crowns on their heads. Women's styles of dress, like their male counterparts, imitate the traditional styles of Ethiopian patriotic women. Of particular note is the dominant presence of the Empress Taytu Betul during these celebrations.

The beloved and influential wife of Emperor Menelik II, Empress Taytu Betul, played a significant role during the Battle of Adwa. Although often overlooked, thousands of women participated in the Battle of Adwa. Some were trained as nurses to attend to the wounded, and others mainly cooked and supplied food and water to the soldiers and comforted the wounded.

In addition to Addis Ababa, other major cities in Ethiopia, including Bahir Dar, Debre Markos and the town of Adwa itself, where the battle took place, celebrate the Victory of Adwa in public ceremonies.

=== Symbols ===
Several images and symbols are used during the commemoration of the Victory of Adwa, including the tri-coloured green, gold and red Ethiopian flag, images of Emperor Menelik II and Empress Taytu Betul, as well as other prominent kings and war generals of the time including King Tekle Haymanot of Gojjam, King Michael of Wollo, Dejazmach Balcha Safo, Fitawrari Habte Giyorgis Dinagde, and Fitawrari Gebeyehu, among others. Surviving members of the Ethiopian patriotic battalions wear the various medals that they collected for their participation on different battlefields.

Young people often wear T-shirts adorned by Emperor Menelik II, Empress Taytu, Emperor Haile Selassie and other notable members of the Ethiopian monarchy. Popular and patriotic songs are often played on amplifiers. Of particular note are Ejigayehu Shibabaw's ballad dedicated to the Battle of Adwa and Teddy Afro's popular song "Tikur Sew", which literally translates to "black man or black person" – a poetic reference to Emperor Menelik II's decisive African victory over Europeans, as well as the Emperor's darker skin complexion.

== See also ==
- Scramble for Africa
- Colonisation of Africa
- Adwa Zero KM Project

== Sources ==
- Bagatin, Pier Luigi; Contegiacomo, Luigi (2021). Il Polesine di Matteotti: Le inchieste giornalistiche di Adolfo Rossi e Jessie White (PDF) (in Italian). Verona: Cierre edizioni. ISBN 978-88-5520-118-6.
- Berkeley, George Fitz-Hardinge (1969). The campaign of Adowa and the rise of Menelik (Reprint of the 1902 edition by A. Constable, Westminister ed.). New York, NY: Negro Univ. Press. ISBN 0837111323. OCLC 11834888.
- Brown, P.S. and Yirgu, F. (1996) The Battle of Adwa 1896, Chicago: Nyala Publishing, 160 pp., ISBN 978-0-9642068-1-6
- Bulatovich, Alexander K. (1900). Seltzer, Richard (translation) (ed.). With the Armies of Menelik II: Journal of an Expedition from Ethiopia to Lake Rudolf, An Eye-Witness Account of The End of An Era. Saint Petersburg: Artistic Press.
- Bulatovich, Alexander K. (2000). Seltzer, Richard (translation) (ed.). Ethiopia Through Russian Eyes: Country in Transition, 1896 - 1898. Lawrenceville, NJ: Red Sea. ISBN 978-1-5690211-7-0.
- Choate, Mark I. (2008). Emigrant Nation: The Making of Italy Abroad. Cambridge, MA: Harvard University Press. ISBN 978-0-674-02784-8.
- Henze, Paul B. (2000). Layers of Time: A History of Ethiopia (1. publ ed.). London: Hurst & Company. ISBN 1-85065-522-7.
- Jonas, R.A. (2011) The Battle of Adwa: African Victory in the Age of Empire, Bellknap Press of Harvard University Press, ISBN 978-0-6740-5274-1
- Lewis, David Levering (1988). The Race to Fashoda: European Colonialism and African Resistance in the Scramble for Africa. London: Bloomsbury. ISBN 0-7475-0113-0.
- McLachlan, Sean; Ruggeri, Raffaele (2011). Armies of the Adowa Campaign 1896: The Italian Disaster in Ethiopia (PDF). London: Bloomsbury Publishing Plc. ISBN 978-1-84908-457-4. Archived from the original on 16 May 2018.
- Marcus, H.G. (1995) The Life and Times of Menelik II: Ethiopia, 1844–1913, Lawrenceville, N.J.: Red Sea Press, ISBN 1-56902-010-8
- Pankhurst, K.P. (1968) Economic History of Ethiopia, 1800–1935, Addis Ababa: Haile Sellassie I University Press, 772 pp., OCLC 65618
- Pankhurst, K.P. (1998) The Ethiopians: A History, The Peoples of Africa Series, Oxford: Blackwell Publishers, ISBN 0-631-22493-9
- Rosenfeld, C.P. (1986) Empress Taytu and Menelik II: Ethiopia 1883–1910, London: Ravens Educational & Development Services, ISBN 0-947895-01-9
- Uhlig, S. (ed.) (2003) Encyclopaedia Aethiopica, 1 (A–C), Wiesbaden: Harrassowitz, ISBN 3-447-04746-1
- Worrell, R. (2005) Pan-Africanism in Barbados: An Analysis of the Activities of the Major 20th-Century Pan-African Formations in Barbados, Washington, DC: New Academia Publishing, ISBN 0-9744934-6-5
- Zewde, Bahru (1991). A History of Modern Ethiopia: 1855-1974. London Athens / Addis Ababa: J. Currey Ohio University Press / Addis Ababa University Press. ISBN 0-85255-067-7.
