= Fitawrari Gebeyehu =

Ethiopian military commander

Fitawrari Gebeyehu Tekle/Kinde Yegidmwork
- Born: 1867; Shewa, Ethiopia
- Died: 1896 (aged 28–29); Adwa, Ethiopia
- Military career
- Allegiance: Ethiopian Empire
- Service years: 1868–1896
- Rank: Lord Protector of the Crown
- Nickname: Aba Goraw
- Conflicts: First Italo-Ethiopian War

Fitawrari Gebeyehu (Amharic: ፊታውራሪ ገበየሁ) popularly referred to by his horse name "Aba Goraw" Amharic "አባ ጎራው", was an accomplished Ethiopian military commander and lord protector of the crown. He played a leading role in several important battles of Ethiopian history.

== Life ==
Fitawrari Gebeyehu was born in the Shewa region, in the Minjar area, into a noble Amhara family. From an early age, he grew up in the palace of Emperor Menelik II, where he received military training and close royal service.

He later rose through the military ranks, starting as a “mato alaka” (commander of a hundred) and eventually becoming “Fitawrari” (commander of the front line).

Little is known about Gebeyehu's early life. Gebeyehu was Fitawrari (Army Commander, a military and aristocratic title). He played a leading role in several important battles of Ethiopian history. He made his reputation at the Battle of Amba Alaje (also known as Amba Alage or Amba Alagi) and later at the Battle of Adwa. In the Battle of Adwa, he commanded 5,000 riflemen, 15,000 spearmen, and 3,000 cavalry.

== Military Career and Engagements ==
Fitawrari Gebeyehu became known for his participation in the Ethiopian–Italian wars of the 1890s. In 1888 E.C. (1896), he played a major role in the Battle of Amba Alagi against Italian forces. At Amba Alagi, Italian troops were fortified inside defensive positions, making it difficult for Ethiopian forces to approach. However, Gebeyehu launched a bold and independent attack, breaking the enemy defenses and contributing to an Ethiopian victory. This success significantly boosted the morale of Ethiopian soldiers. He was also wounded during the Battle of Mekelle.

== Battle of Adwa ==
During the Battle of Adwa on Yekatit 23, 1888 E.C. (March 1, 1896), Fitawrari Gebeyehu served as a frontline commander. He directly engaged the Italian forces led by General Albertone. At the height of the battle, he fought with a sword and led assaults on the main battlefield. During the fighting, he was struck by enemy gunfire and severely wounded. Despite his injuries, he continued to encourage his soldiers and fought until his final moments. He ultimately died on the battlefiel

== Reputation and Recognition ==
Fitawrari Gebeyehu became known for his participation in the Ethiopian–Italian wars of the 1890s. In 1888 E.C. (1896), he played a major role in the Battle of Amba Alagi against Italian forces. At Amba Alagi, Italian troops were fortified inside defensive positions, making it difficult for Ethiopian forces to approach. Gebeyehu launched an independent attack, breaking the enemy defenses and contributing to an Ethiopian victory. This success boosted the morale of Ethiopian soldiers. He was also wounded during the Battle of Mekelle.

== Legacy ==
Fitawrari Gebeyehu is remembered as a national hero of Ethiopia. His contribution to the Battle of Adwa helped secure Ethiopia's independence. His story continues to be a symbol of courage and sacrifice in Ethiopian history.

== Historical Significance ==
The Battle of Adwa is a major event in modern Ethiopian history. It represents one of the first major African victories over a European colonial power. Fitawrari Gebeyehu was among the key commanders who contributed to this historic victory.

== Death ==
Gebeyehu was killed in action in the Battle of Adwa. He played a crucial role in the winning of the battle of Adwa. During the battle, he was the front cavalry assault leader for the king's army. While leading the assault He witnessed a large number of Italian military preparing an ambush and slaughter for the large Ethiopian army headed by Emperor Menelik II. He realized unless he acted to the ambush in time the large army would be easily destroyed by the ambush. Then he drives his cavalry army direct into the fully fortified Italian army and began the attack and gave the king's army to escape the ambush and arrive at the battle filed. He was killed at this battle fighting fearlessly. A street in Addis Ababa is named after Gebeyehu. He is still known for his military skills.
