= Giovanni Romero =

Italian colonel (1841-1896)

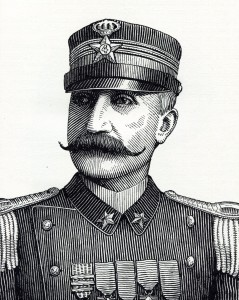
- Born: 8 March 1841; Montara, Kingdom of Sardinia
- Died: 1 March 1896 (aged 54); Adwa, Tigray, Ethiopia
- Military career
- Allegiance: Sardinia; Italy
- Branch: Royal Sardinian Army; Royal Italian Army
- Service years: 1866 – 1896
- Rank: Colonel
- Commands: 4th Africa Infantry Regiment
- Conflicts: Second Italian War of Independence: Battle of San Martino; Third Italian War of Independence: Battle of Custoza; First Italo-Ethiopian War: Battle of Adwa †
- Awards: Gold Medal of Military Valour

Giovanni Romero (1841–1896) was an Italian colonel who participated in several conflicts during the 19th century. He participated in the Second Italian War of Independence and the Third Italian War of Independence, most notably leading the 4th Africa Infantry Regiment during the Battle of Adwa of the First Italo-Ethiopian War before being killed at the battle. Romero was also a posthumous recipient of the Gold Medal of Military Valour.

== Italian Wars of Independence ==
Giovanni was born on 8 March 1841, at Mortara, Lombardy as the son of Giuseppe Romero and Maddalena Gabetti. He volunteered for the 11th Infantry Regiment on 24 June 1859, during the Second Italian War of Independence. Romero proceeded to participate at the Battle of San Martino and for his service at the battle, he was awarded the Silver Medal of Military Valour as well as a promotion to Second Lieutenant of the 15th Infantry Regiment. He then partook in campaigns within Umbria after Sardinia annexed the Grand Duchy of Tuscany. He was subsequently transferred to the 1st Bersaglieri Infantry Regiment and promoted to Captain on 7 June 1866, and returned to the 51st Infantry Regiment and then participated in the Third Italian War of Independence. During the Battle of Custoza, Romero launched an ambitious charge at the Austrian lines, managing to capture Belvedere along with several soldiers, including 4 officers. For this, he was awarded the Knight's Cross of the Military Order of Savoy.

== Service in Eritrea and Adwa ==
In 1873, when the corps of Alpine troops had been formed, it was assigned to the companies of the Cuneo District and Romero was promoted in 1883 while commanding a battalion of the 42nd Infantry Regiment. In November 1889, as a Lieutenant Colonel, he became a teacher at the Caserta Non-commissioned Officers School for 4 years. He was promoted to Colonel in March 1894 and commanded the 29th Infantry Regiment. When relations between Italy and Ethiopia began to sour, Romero adamantly left Naples on 30 December 1895, to arrive at Massawa in January 1896. There, he was given commands of battalions VII, VIII, IX and XI of the 4th African Infantry Regiment of the 3rd Reserve Brigade. During the Battle of Adwa, when the brigade was set to capture Colle Rebbi Arienni, the brigade suddenly found themselves being overwhelmed by the Shewan hordes as they managed to collapse the entire Italian positions. In a last attempt to defend the road to Colle Rebbi Arienni, Romero spread his battalions out but was killed in a hand-to-hand duel.

== Medal Citation ==
Two years later, the Italian government posthumously awarded Romero with the Gold Medal of Military Valour. Its citation read:

He fought bravely at the head of his regiment to the last. Badly wounded and surrounded, he strenuously defended himself in a hand-to-hand fight; overwhelmed, he fought again not to be taken prisoner, until again and badly hit, he died as a result of his injuries.

== Legacy ==
A street in Mortara is named after Romero.
