= Giuseppe Arimondi =

Italian general during Battle of Adwa (1846–1896)

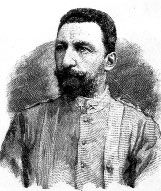
- Born: 26 April 1846; Savigliano, Kingdom of Sardinia
- Died: 1 March 1896 (aged 49) Adwa, Tigray, Ethiopian Empire
- Allegiance: Kingdom of Italy
- Branch: Royal Italian Army
- Service years: 1865–1896
- Rank: Major General
- Conflicts: Mahdist War; Second Battle of Agordat; Battle of Kassala; First Italo-Ethiopian War; Battle of Coatit; Battle of Adwa †
- Awards: Gold Medal of Military Valor

Giuseppe Edoardo Arimondi, OSML, OMS, OCI (26 April 1846 – 1 March 1896) was an Italian general, mostly known for his role during the First Italo-Ethiopian War. He was one of the few European commanders who gained a victory over the Mahdists before Kitchener's Expedition, soundly defeating them at Agordat in 1893. After a long and successful colonial service, he died in combat at Adwa, and was posthumously awarded the Gold Medal of Military Valour.

== Early life ==
Born in Savigliano on 26 April 1846, Arimondi attended the Royal Military Academy in Modena. After graduating in 1865, he was appointed sub-lieutenant in the Bersaglieri, and fought in the 1866 Italo-Austrian War. Upon reaching the rank of captain he served as a military observer during the Franco-Prussian War. He then attended the School of War and in 1874 was promoted major in the Army Staff.

== Colonial service in Eritrea ==
In 1887, Arimondi was assigned as a staff officer to the expeditionary corps of General Alessandro Asinari di San Marzano and left for Eritrea, where he stayed until 1890. In 1892, he was promoted to colonel and sent again to Eritrea with full command of all native troops in the colony. In this position, he won a series of minor clashes and defeated the Dervishes under Emir Ahmed Alì at the Second Battle of Agordat in December 1893. In this battle, he remarkably decided to deploy his men in an extended battle line, with reserves echeloned at the rear. This caught by surprise the Mahdists, who were expecting close square formations as the ones adopted by British infantry in previous engagements. For this victory he received a promotion to major general.

In 1894 he commanded the 2nd Operational Corps under General Oreste Baratieri, fighting the Battle of Kassala and the Battle of Coatit. Arimondi urged rapid and daring offensive manoeuvres and quarreled with Baratieri's more cautious plans. When the Governor refused to support his projects of a preventive attack against Menelik II in Tigray, he twice requested permission to return home. The Minister of War refused, not willing to replace one of the most experienced colonial officers.

This situation eventually led to the massacre of Major Pietro Toselli's column. Isolated in an outpost at Amba Alagi, Toselli never received the order to retreat and was trapped by the army of Menelik. Arimondi, who had previously advanced to Aderà, 20 km (12 mi) away, was stopped by a telegram from Baratieri and forced to retreat. This left Toselli and Galliano to fend for themselves at the battle of Amba Alagi and the siege of Mek'ele.

== Battle of Adwa and death ==
On 12 February, pressed by the Prime Minister Francesco Crispi, Baratieri had his forces dug in at strong positions at Sauria, 26 km (16 mi) from Menelik's camp. By 27 February, the army had only a few days supply left and the intelligence wrongly reported that the Ethiopians were scattered across the hills of Adwa, foraging. Unable or unwilling to decide between a temporary withdrawal or a small advance, the Governor asked for the advice of his brigade commanders: Arimondi, Matteo Albertone, Vittorio Dabormida and the newly appointed Giuseppe Ellena. Arimondi estimated Menelik's forces at 50,000–60,000 warriors and, supported by his colleagues, urged for an aggressive approach.

On 28 February, Baratieri resolved to advance towards the Ethiopian camp at Adwa. His orders on 29 February called for an offensive thrust to occupy a solid position on the hill east of Adwa. From there on he could react according to the moves of the Abyssinians; defend if attacked, keep the position if unmolested or attack the rearguard of the Negus' army if it retreated from Adwa. The field force was ordered to move during the night; Albertone and the Native Brigade on the left flank were to occupy the Kidane Meret peak, Dabormida on the right flank, the mountain of the Rebbi Arienni and Arimondi, with the centre, again the Rebbi Arienni, in a less prominent position. The reserve brigade of General Ellena was stationed behind Arimondi.

=== Night march ===
During the night of 29 February/1 March, Arimondi's Infantry Brigade marched without his native battalion, which could not be assembled in time from the several outposts it was guarding, leaving the centre weaker than intended. At 21:30 the brigades of Albertone, Arimondi and Dabormida were on their way, each following different roads; Ellena's brigade was to follow Arimondi three hours later, with Baratieri and his staff.

At midnight it was found that the track followed by Albertone and Arimondi were converging. Arimondi stopped and let Albertone pass ahead. The Native Brigade marched faster than the two European formations and by 3:30 a.m. Albertone reached his position. His guides, though, informed him that the brigade was on Erarà Hill and not on the Kidane Meret, as intended. Albertone thus decided to resume the march until he reached what his guides reported as the 'real' Kidane Meret, 6.4 km (4 mi) away.

This decision opened a wide gap in the Italian lines, and isolated Albertone's force from Arimondi and Dabormida. The two Italian brigades had deployed on the Rebbi Arienni by 5:30 a.m., while on the Kidane Meret Albertone was launching his attack on the Ethiopian camp. The Native Brigade at first met little resistance, but was soon repulsed by the larger number of enemy troops.

=== Albertone's collapse ===
At 6:30 a.m., Baratieri reached the Rebbi Arienni and heard the sounds of the fight on the left. He ordered Dabormida to relieve the pressure on Albertone, then brought up the reserve to occupy the position vacated by Dabormida. At 8:15 a.m. a message from Albertone (sent at 7:00 a.m.) reached Baratieri: the general was under heavy attack and in dire need of reinforcements. Baratieri ordered Arimondi to advance and form his line between Mount Rajo and Bellah, while Ellena occupied the Rebbi Arienni.

Due to the broken ground which slowed his progress, Arimondi completed his movement at 9:00 a.m. Almost immediately he came upon a trickle of wounded soldiers from Albertone's brigade, which had been forced to retreat on the nearby Mount Semaiata. Within half an hour the trickle became a stream and Baratieri sent Albertone orders to retire and reform under Arimondi's cover. It was too late: the Colonial Brigade, out of ammunition, disintegrated shortly afterwards. At 10:00 a.m. the Ethiopian forces, mixed with the fleeing Ascaris, launched their first assault on Arimondi's position.

=== Arimondi's stand and death ===
After the initial Ethiopian attacks were repulsed, Menelik sent his guard to outflank the left side of Arimondi's forces. The colonial battalion of Galliano, the only unit Ellena could detach to guard Arimondi's right flank, was overwhelmed. But although the Ethiopian rifle fire was very ineffective, the Italians were dismayed by enemy groups that were attempting to outflank them. A group that had nestled on the Mount Belah forced two Bersaglieri battalions to retreat, while a Alpini reserve battalion sent to halt the advance was completely annihilated, with only 95 out of the 608 men managing to survive. Meanwhile, the Ethiopians were boldly advancing to the main Italian positions on Mount Rajo and were firing at the Italians at almost point-blank range.

With Arimondi's brigade hard-pressed on the front and outflanked on both sides, General Baratieri ordered a general retreat at 12:30. Once the retreat began, the Galla horsemen rushed forward and began slaughtering the fleeing Italians in large numbers. During this chaotic phase, Arimondi bravely attempted to save his artillery batteries. He was then killed in hand to hand fighting while trying to load a cannon carriage onto a mule.

== Awards and decorations ==
- Gold Medal of Military Valour – Adwa, 1 March 1896
- Silver Medal of Military Valor – For his role as commander of the 2nd Operational Corps during all the operations in Eastern Africa and the Battle of Coatit, Adwa campaign, 1894–1896
- Officer of the Order of Saint Maurice and Lazarus – For the Battle of Kassala, 17 July 1894
- Officer of the Military Order of Savoy – For his role as commander of the 2nd Operational Corps in the capture of Kassala, 27 September 1894
- Commander of the Order of the Crown of Italy – June 1895. Previously promoted Officer in January 1895.

== Notes ==
=== Bibliography ===
- MacLachlan, Sean (2011). Armies of the Adowa Campaign 1896. Oxford: Osprey. ISBN 978-1-84908-457-4.

=== Further reading ===
- Berkeley, G. F-H. (1902) The Campaign of Adowa and the Rise of Menelik, Westminster: A. Constable, 403 pp., OCLC 11834888
- Brown, P.S. and Yirgu, F. (1996) The Battle of Adwa 1896, Chicago: Nyala Publishing, 160 pp., ISBN 978-0-9642068-1-6
- (it) Del Boca, A. (2002) Gli italiani in Africa Orientale. Dall'Unità alla marcia su Roma [The Italians in Eastern Africa: From the Unification to the March on Rome], Milan, Arnoldo Mondadori Editore, ISBN 88-04-46946-3
- Marcus, H. G. (1995) The Life and Times of Menelik II: Ethiopia, 1844–1913, Lawrenceville, N. J.: Red Sea Press, ISBN 1-56902-010-8
