= Giuseppe Ellena =

Italian artillery officer

Maj. Gen. Giuseppe Ellena
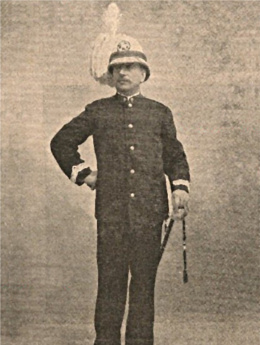
- Born: 29 March 1839; Saluzzo, Piedmont, Italy
- Died: 24 November 1918 (aged 79); Florence, Tuscany, Italy
- Military career
- Allegiance: Kingdom of Italy
- Rank: Major General
- Conflicts: Third Italian War of Independence; First Italo-Ethiopian War; Battle of Adwa (WIA)

Major General Giuseppe Ellena (29 March 1839 – 24 November 1918) was an Italian artillery officer who fought in the First Italo-Ethiopian War. He was also a professor of hydraulics and architecture.

== Biography ==
Ellena was born in Saluzzo on 29 March 1839.

Ellena joined the Italian Military after getting a degree in engineering, and became an artillery officer in 1859. He would serve in the Austro-Italian War of 1866 and become a teacher at the Artillery and Engineering School of Turin.

Using his knowledge as an artillery officer, in 1873 Ellena wrote about the science behind artillery shells and the utility of regimental schools. On 16 March 1893 Ellena was granted the rank of Major General for his long military career and academic work in the study of artillery and regimental schools.

=== Battle of Adwa ===
Ellena arrived in Eritrea on 17 February 1896, having left Italy with a group of reinforcements on 25 January 1896, and would quickly find himself under the command of Oreste Baratieri. At this point in his career, he was considered one of the best artillery officers in the Italian Army. He was the oldest and latest of the five Italian generals at the Battle of Adwa to enter Africa. Despite being the oldest, he deferred to the other officers at the prebattle discussions, although they looked to him to share what the political situation was back in Rome. He would agree with the offensive that would result in the battle.

The battle took place on 1 March 1896. During it, Ellena commanded the 3rd infantry brigade, which served as reserves, following the centre. The Italian forces lost and Ellen found himself assisting Baratieri in the retreat. Three of the other four generals died at the battle and the remaining one, Matteo Albertone, was taken prisoner. Of the deceased generals' forces, Giuseppe Arimondi's men would retreat to Ellena's position on Mount Roja and help form the rearguard for the retreat.

Ellena himself was injured during the battle, resulting in him being taken to a military hospital. While there he would pen letters blaming the loss on a lack of intelligence, geographical knowledge, and no retreat plans in place. Soon after the battle, he returned to Italy. Ellena received heavy criticism for leaving Africa so quickly after the defeat, but would continue to maintain regular correspondence with Baratieri; during which he blamed the loss on the disobedience of the other generals: Albertone, Arimondi, and Vittorio Dabormida.

Ellena died in 1918 in Florence.

== Written works ==
- Nozioni: sulle polveri, sulle munizioni e sugli artifizi da guerra, compiled by Ellena was published in 1873
