= Davide Menini =

Italian Lieutenant Colonel (1843-1896)

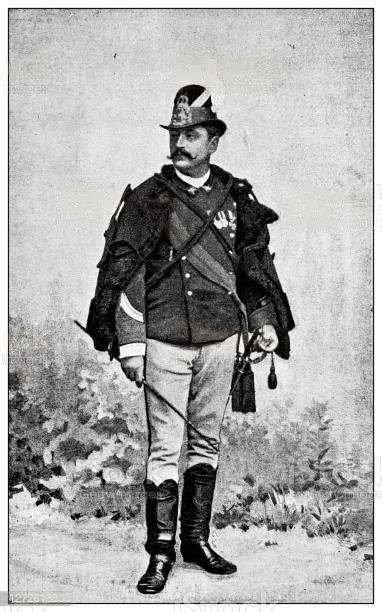
- Menini during the First Italo-Ethiopian War
- Born: 1843; Genoa, Liguria, Sardinia-Piedmont
- Died: March 1, 1896 (aged 52–53); Adwa, Tigray, Ethiopia
- Military career
- Allegiance: Italy
- Branch: Royal Italian Army
- Service years: 1866 – 1896
- Rank: Lieutenant Colonel
- Commands: 1st Africa Alpini Battalion
- Conflicts: Third Italian War of Independence: Battle of Custoza; First Italo-Ethiopian War: Battle of Adwa †

Davide Menini was an Italian Lieutenant Colonel of the First Italo-Ethiopian War. He participated in the Battle of Custoza of the Third Italian War of Independence and commanded the 1st Africa Alpini Battalion during the Battle of Adwa before being killed in the battle.

== Biography ==
Menini was a veteran of the Battle of Custoza in 1866 and he joined the corps of the Alpini since its establishment, becoming famous in the group for having embarked on December 29, 1895, aboard the ship Gottardo which carried the 1st Africa Alpini Battalion to Italian Eritrea. Promoted to major, Menini found himself managing the 1st company, led by Giovanni Trossarelli, with men from the 1st Alpini Regiment, the 2nd company, led by Ernesto Mestrallet, with men from the 2nd Alpini Regiment, the 3rd company led by Captain Lorenzo Blanchin, with troops of the 4th Alpini Regiment and the 4th company, led by Captain Pietro Cella, with troops of the 5th, 6th and 7th Alpini Regiment. He had command of 20 officers and 954 between non-commissioned officers, graduates and soldiers. The troops settled shortly afterwards by order of Menini himself at the fort of Adigrat, at 2473 meters above sea level.

Menini's commanded the 1st Africa Alpini Battalion were involved shortly after in the Battle of Adwa which represented the bloodiest phase of the First Italo-Ethiopian War. It was fought on March 1, 1896, at the Amba Rajo against the Ethiopian troops. During the battle, Menini was promoted to lieutenant colonel but he died the same day of the battle becoming famous for having refused help to allow his men to advance, urging them as he shouted "Come on, my Alpini!".

A notable climber, he discovered the Menini Canal, an access road to Mount Antelao in the Dolomites on August 7, 1886.

== Works ==
- Operazioni militari alla frontiera Nord-Ovest. Memorie di escursioni alpine del 1890., Verona, 1891

== Awards ==
- Silver Medal of Military Valor
- Commemorative Medal of the African Campaigns
- Commemorative Medal of the Unity of Italy
