= Leopoldo Prato =

Italian major (1845–1896)

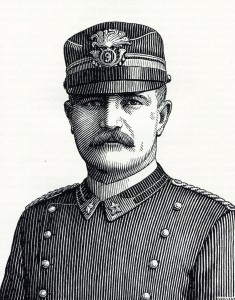
- Born: February 3, 1845; Pamparato, Piedmont, Sardinia-Piedmont
- Died: March 1, 1896 (aged 51); Adwa, Tigray, Ethiopia
- Alma mater: Scuola Militare di Fanteria
- Military career
- Allegiance: Italy
- Branch: Royal Italian Army
- Service years: 1862 – 1896
- Rank: Major
- Commands: 6th African Infantry Battalion
- Conflicts: First Italo-Ethiopian War: Battle of Adwa †
- Awards: Gold Medal of Military Valor

Leopoldo Cesare Prato was an Italian major of the First Italo-Ethiopian War. He commanded the 6th African Infantry Battalion during the Battle of Adwa before being killed in the battle. He was also a posthumous recipient of the Gold Medal of Military Valor for his service in the battle.

== Biography ==
Leopoldo was born on February 3, 1845, at Pamparato as the son of Antonio Prato and Luigia Barberis. He enlisted as a volunteer on August 5, 1862, with a term of eight years. In March 1864, he was assigned to the 1st Bersaglieri Infantry Regiment as a corporal before being promoted to sergeant and quartermaster. Prato was then admitted to the Scuola Militare di Fanteria on April 1, 1873, and was appointed Second Lieutenant the next year. Initially assigned to the 10th Bersaglieri Infantry Regiment on April 29, he was promoted to lieutenant by 1879 and was transferred to the 3rd Bersaglieri Infantry Regiment, which was stationed at Messina on May 17, 1880, along with a promotion to captain. On March 21, 1886, he assumed the rank of Adjutant Major and from September 18, 1887, to August 1, 1889, Prato served in the Military College of Messina as a teacher of geography and later, on Adjutant Majors.

On August 5, he submitted a request for Eritrea and was assigned to the superior command of the colony. However, he only remained there for 16 months as he soon returned to the Italian mainland and was assigned to the 9th Bersaglieri Infantry Regiment. Promoted to major in 1894, Prato was initially assigned to the District of Cagliari, but on August 19, 1894, he was tasked with organizing the 6th African Infantry Battalion on December 18, 1895. He departed from Naples aboard the steamship Adria for Massawa which he arrived on January 10, 1896, where he was assigned to the 3rd Infantry Regiment of the 2nd Brigade. On the evening of February 29, 1896, Prato began his march around 9 pm and reached his positions at Colle Rebbi Arienni, where he deployed his troops. On the morning of March 1, Prato and his battalion began a valiant fight as they were constantly being pursued by the enemy, which overwhelmed the centre forces of the brigade. During the defence, Prato was wounded 4 times but despite that, he stood his ground and continued to fire with his revolver until he was killed by a lance while attempting to retreat.

== Medal citation ==
In November 1898, the Italian government awarded Prato the Gold Medal of Military Valor. His citation read:

Slightly wounded three times by a firearm he never left the command of the battalion which he repeatedly pushed rigorously to the assault. He carried out the last stand of the brigade with rare courage and energy. Adua (Eritrea), 1 March 1896.

== Legacy ==
A monument dedicated to Prato with a bust was erected at Pamparato on July 24, 1899.
