= Vittorio Dabormida =

Italian general during Battle of Adwa (1842–1896)

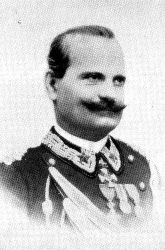
- Born: 25 November 1842; Turin, Kingdom of Sardinia
- Died: 1 March 1896 (aged 53) Adwa, Tigray Province, Ethiopian Empire
- Allegiance: Kingdom of Italy
- Branch: Royal Italian Army
- Service years: 1861–1896
- Rank: Major General
- Conflicts: Third Italian War of Independence First Italo-Ethiopian War: Battle of Adwa †
- Awards: Gold Medal of Military Valor

Vittorio Emanuele Dabormida, 2nd Count Dabormida, OSML, OCI (25 November 1842 – 1 March 1896) was an Italian general and noble, mostly known for his role during the First Italo-Ethiopian War. He died in combat at Adwa, and was posthumously awarded the Gold Medal of Military Valor.

== Early life ==
Dabormida was the son of Count Giuseppe Dabormida, an artillery colonel, Minister of War of the Kingdom of Sardinia during the First Italian War of Independence and Foreign Minister in the first Cavour government. He was admitted to the Royal Military Academy in 1859, and graduated in December 1861 as an artillery sub-lieutenant. In March 1862, he was attached to the Artillery Staff, and assigned to the 5th Artillery Regiment a year later. On 31 December 1863, Dabormida was promoted to lieutenant. During the 1866 Italo-Austrian War he commanded a supply column, and by December was moved to the Army Staff. A year later he entered the newly-founded School of War for a two-year specialization course. Promoted to captain in 1868, in 1870 he started teaching courses of Military History at the same institution.

== Army staff and academic career ==
Dabormida served as a professor in the School of War for eight years, until promoted Infantry major in 1878. Quite a prolific writer, he published Sunti sullo svolgimento storico dell'arte della guerra prima della rivoluzione francese (trans. "Essays on the history of the art of war before the French revolution") in 1874, and in 1876 Vincenzo Gioberti e il Dabormida, a defence of his father's actions against the accusations made by Vincenzo Gioberti in 1857. In 1878 he wrote La difesa delle nostre frontiere occidentali in relazione agli ordinamenti militari odierni (trans. "The defence of our western borders with respect to current military organization"): the increasing attrition with France after the collapse of the Second French Empire led him to analyze the possibility of a conflict between France and Italy. Dabormida urged the usage of the Alps as a strong defensive line capable of restoring balance of force in a fight with the more numerous French, against the common opinion based on Napoleonic experience that deemed the mountains a mere delaying obstacle.

The same year he published, on the same matter, a study: Ordinamento militare delle popolazioni alpine (trans. "Military organization of Alpine people") and, in August 1879, he was back to the School of War as full professor. While maintaining his teaching activity, in May 1880 Dabormida was re-attached to the Army Staff, and by November 1881 he was nominated secretary to the Army Chief of Staff, general Cosenz and promoted to lieutenant colonel in 1883. He served in this secretarial capacity until June 1887, when he was reassigned to the 3rd Infantry Regiment as provisional commander. In April 1888 he was promoted colonel and confirmed in his role. Two years later, Dabormida was again reassigned to the Army Staff. In 1891, he published in Rome La battaglia dell'Assietta, a study of the 1747 Battle of Assietta he had written for his students when he was a teacher at the School of War.

Promoted major general in July 1895, he took command of the "Cagliari" Brigade. On 12 January 1896, he was shipped to Eritrea and took command of the 2nd Infantry Brigade.

== Battle of Adwa and death ==
On 12 February 1896, pressed by the Prime Minister Francesco Crispi, Baratieri had his forces dug in at strong positions at Sauria, 26 km (16 mi) from Menelik's camp. By 27 February, the army only had a few days of supplies left and the intelligence wrongly reported that the Ethiopians were scattered across the hills of Adwa, foraging. Unable or unwilling to decide between a temporary withdrawal or a small advance, the Governor asked for the advice of his brigade commanders: Giuseppe Arimondi, Matteo Albertone, Dabormida and the newly appointed Giuseppe Ellena. Dabormida joined Arimondi and Albertone in their call for an aggressive approach, reportedly arguing that, since the troops' morale was high, a retreat would only bring it down. He declared that Italy would prefer the loss of two to three thousand men to a dishonorable retreat.

On 28 February, Baratieri resolved to advance towards the Ethiopian camp at Adwa. His orders on 29 February called for an offensive thrust to occupy a solid position on the hill east of Adwa. From there on he could react according to the moves of the Abyssinians; defend if attacked, keep the position if unmolested or attack the rearguard of the Negus' army if it retreated from Adwa. His forces were ordered to move during the night; Albertone and the Native Brigade on the left flank, was to occupy the Kidane Meret peak; Dabormida, on the right flank, the mountain of the Rebbi Arienni, with Arimondi, in the center, also on the Rebbi Arienni, though in a less prominent position. The brigade of General Ellena was stationed behind Arimondi as a reserve.

=== Night march ===
At 21:30 the brigades of Albertone, Arimondi and Dabormida were on their way, each following different roads; Ellena's brigade was to follow Arimondi three hours later, with Baratieri and his staff.

Uninvolved in the marching incidents between Arimondi and Albertone, Dabormida reached his intended position at 5:15 on 1 March, fifteen minutes before his colleague. By the time he deployed his men, the isolated force of Albertone on the Kidane Meret was launching its attack on the Ethiopian camp. The Native Brigade at first met little resistance, but was soon repulsed by the larger number of enemy troops.

=== Dabormida's advance ===
At 6:45 Baratieri, who had spent a full hour reconnoitering the ground on which he planned to fight, reached the Rebbi Arienni and heard the sounds of the ongoing battle on the left. He ordered Dabormida to advance to the Spur of Belah and to support Albertone, whom he assumed to be at the "false" Kidane Meret or a little ahead. Once Dabormida got his brigade to the Spur, he discovered Albertone was much further off than supposed, and continued his slow progression westward across difficult ground. By 7:45 his rearguard had left the Hill and Spur of Belah, and, following the terrain's nature, Dabormida's brigade entered the west–east arm of the Mariam Shavitu valley, about 3 miles north of Albertone's Native Brigade.

By 8:15 the morning mist cleared: Baratieri climbed the slopes of Mount Eshasho to survey the situation, and discovered that Albertone was heavily engaged. At 8:30 the advanced 1st Native Battalion of Albertone's command was forced to retreat in disarray: Baratieri sent a message to Dabormida, ordering him to aid Albertone, but the messenger decided he could turn back once he had met a courier from Dabormida. The commander of the 2nd Infantry Brigade informed his commanding officer that he was "holding out his hand to Albertone", and Baratieri assumed the 2nd Brigade was about to link up with Albertone. Baratieri, still assuming Dabormida had a strong hold over the Spur of Belah, sent two other messengers, but neither reached Dabormida. Actually, the major general had left only local auxiliaries at the Spur, and about 9:30 they had been driven off by infiltrating Ethiopians, who then also started to attack the isolated 2nd Brigade.

In the Mariam Shavitu valley, Ras Makonnen's men confronted the Italian units. The Ethiopians were initially repelled, and the Italians advanced towards the bottom of the valley, positioning themselves between the Azghebà and Mehebàr Cedàl mountains. However, at around 10:00, a column of Shewan troops, under the command of the Emperor Menelik II, attacked De Vito's indigenous battalion at Mount Diriam, overwhelming it after half an hour of fighting. Subsequently, the Shewans split into two columns: one proceeded towards the Belah to circumvent the flank of the Arimondi brigade, which was left exposed. The other column turned left to strike the flank and rear of the isolated Dabormida brigade.

=== Death ===
The Dabormida brigade, the last to resist in the Mariam Shavitu valley, had in the meantime managed to repel Ras Makonnen's assault. Dabormida had just sent the news of this initial success to commander Baratieri when the Ethiopians who had just previously routed Arimondi's column on Monte Rajo broke in behind him. Dabormida's soldiers resisted for more than an hour, maintaining discipline as best as they could, until the general, up to then having been deprived of any news of what was happening on the battlefield at large, learned about the defeat of the rest of the Italian army.

Upon realizing the gravity of the situation and clearly threatened with encirclement, at 15:00 he ordered a fighting retreat towards Mount Erar at the valley's bottom. The withdrawal was executed in an organized manner, but attacks by the Ethiopians, inflicted heavy losses on the retreating Italians. Dabormida himself fell during this phase, though the circumstances of his death remain unclear. According to the British journalist Augustus Wylde, Dabormida himself was killed by a warrior named Shaqa Tamre, whom Wylde interviewed shortly after the battle: "Dabormida had just shot three men with his revolver, he then shot at my informant and missed him. The Abyssinian got behind a tree, and when Dabormida turned to face another of his enemies he shot him dead."

The remnants of Dabormida's brigade continued to resist throughout the afternoon, first at Mount Erar and then at Mount Esciascia; only in the evening did the survivors of the Dabormida column, now led by Colonel Ottavio Ragni, begin their final retreat, heading towards the Zalà hill. The presence of large enemy units forced the Italians to divide into two smaller columns: one, led by Ragni, headed towards the old Italian camp in Saurià and continued towards Mai Maret and then headed towards Adi Keyh; the other, led by Captain Pavesi, went up the Yeha valley, and then reached Adi Ugri.

== Awards and decorations ==
- Gold Medal of Military Valor – Adwa, 1 March 1896
- Officer of the Order of Saint Maurice and Lazarus – August 1895
- Commander of the Order of the Crown of Italy – January 1895

== Notes ==
=== Bibliography ===
- MacLachlan, Sean (2011). Armies of the Adowa Campaign 1896. Oxford: Osprey. ISBN 978-1-84908-457-4.
