= Cesare Airaghi =

Italian colonel (1840–1896)

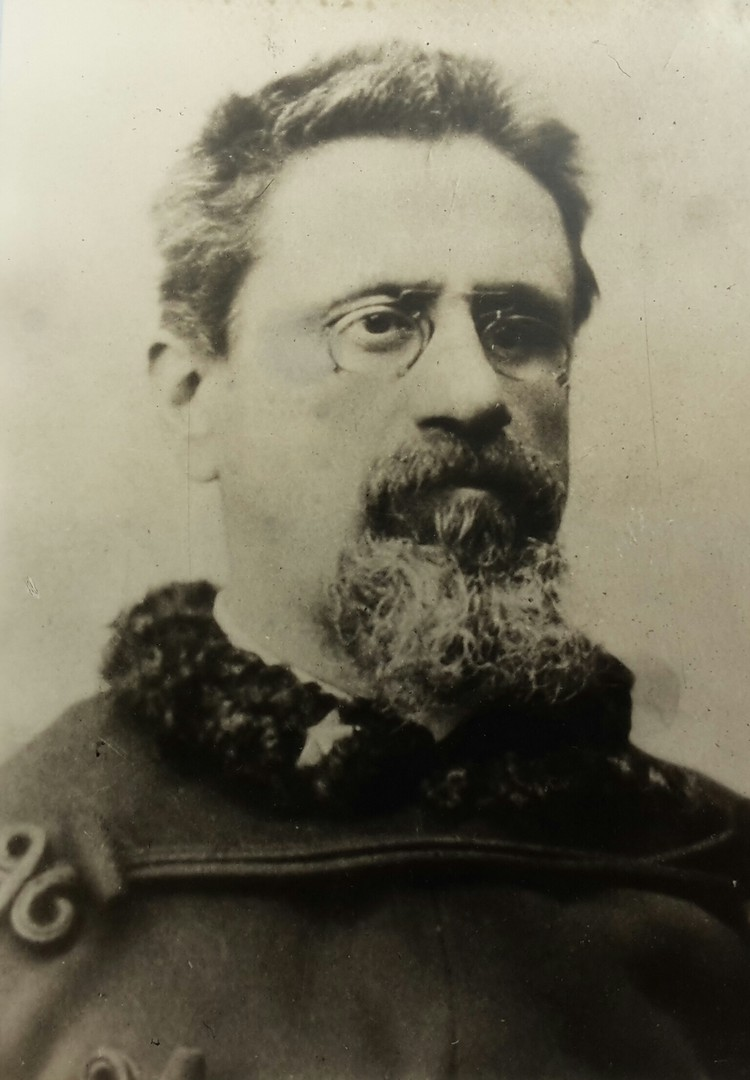
- Born: 4 October 1840; Milan, Kingdom of Lombardy–Venetia, Austrian Empire
- Died: 1 March 1896 (aged 55); Adwa, Tigray, Ethiopia
- Education: University of Pavia
- Military career
- Allegiance: Sardinia; Italy
- Branch: Royal Sardinian Army; Royal Italian Army
- Service years: 1859 – 1896
- Rank: Colonel
- Conflicts: Second Italian War of Independence: Battle of Palestro; Third Italian War of Independence; First Italo-Ethiopian War: Battle of Adwa †

Cesare Airaghi (4 October 1840 - 1 March 1896) was an Italian military officer and war hero who participated in several conflicts during the 19th century. While attending the University of Pavia, Airaghi enlisted in the 9th Infantry Regiment and participated in the Second Italian War of Independence. Following the war, he finished his studies and graduated as an engineer.

He was promoted to captain on 14 July 1866 and fought in the Third Italian War of Independence. He was promoted to colonel in October 1888 and fought in the First Italo-Ethiopian War before being killed at the Battle of Adwa. Airaghi was posthumously awarded the Gold Medal of Military Valor on 1 March 1896, for his command at Adwa and a plaque was placed in Milan in his memory.

== Early years ==
Cesare was born on 4 October 1840, as the son of Giovanni Battista and Marietta Lattuada at Milan. When he was 14, his father was killed and Cesare was forced to be responsible for his family's finance. While attending the University of Pavia, Airaghi enlisted in the 9th Infantry Regiment and participated in the Second Italian War of Independence. He was appointed as Second Lieutenant of the 17th Infantry Division and fought at the Battle of Palestro. After the war, Airaghi resumed his studies at the University of Pavia and eventually graduated as an engineer.

== Military career ==
Airaghi was promoted to Lieutenant on 17 June 1861, while at the 28th Infantry Regiment and to captain on 14 July 1866. He then participated in the Third Italian War of Independence and fought the Austrians at Borgosatollo and Levico. After the war, he returned to the 28th Infantry Regiment from 1874 to March 1878 and two months later, he was promoted to major. He then proceeded to work as a tactical teacher at the Royal Academy of Turin in July 1883 and was promoted to lieutenant colonel in April 1884. Around 1888, Airaghi was given command of the 77th Infantry Regiment and promoted to Colonel in October 1888. Around September 1889, Airaghi was sent to Eritrea and stationed at the Asmara–Keren area before being transferred to Massawa. In January 1890, he took part in an expedition to Ethiopia under the command of Baldassarre Orero before returning to the Italian mainland in October of the same year. He was then given command of the 36th Infantry Regiment but left on 1 August 1893, following a request to become an auxiliary.

== Battle of Adwa ==
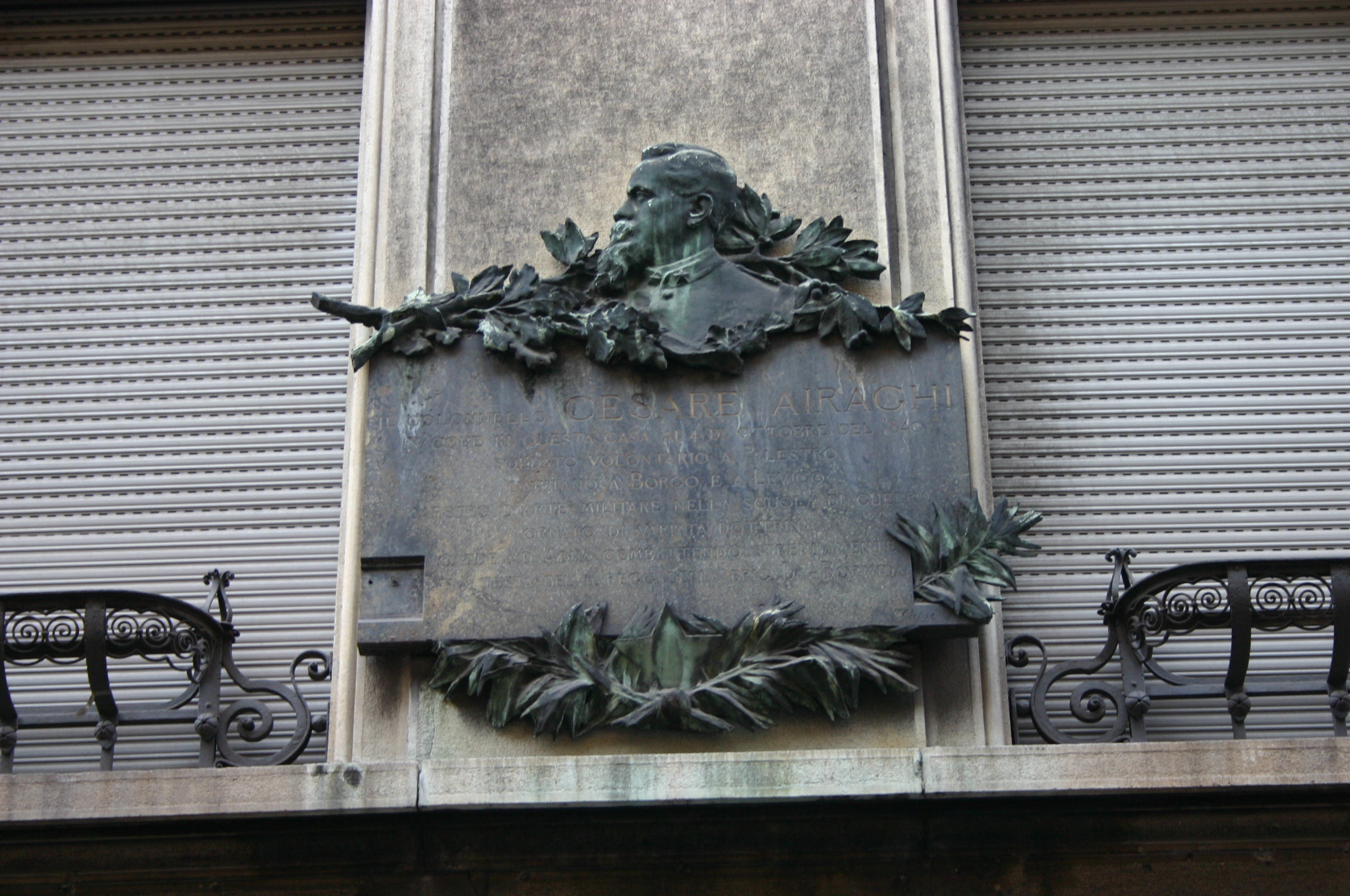
A commemorative plaque on the birthplace of Cesare Airaghi in Via Bigli, Milan.

On 13 January 1896, Airaghi was called to Eritrea to participate in the First Italo-Ethiopian War as he commanded the 6th African Infantry Regiment as part of the 2nd Brigade of the Right column. On the evening of 29 February, Airaghi began his march towards Adwa, reaching the Rebbi Arienni on 1 March. During the Battle of Adwa, he conducted repeated assaults on the Ethiopian forces with enthusiasm and courage. Despite his success at keeping the Ethiopian forces back, they were beginning to outnumber Airaghi's regiment, and they surrounded and he was killed in the fighting. Airaghi was posthumously awarded the Gold Medal of Military Valor on 1 March 1896, for his command at Adwa and a plaque was placed in Milan in memory.
