= Francesco De Rosa =

Italian major (1853–1896)

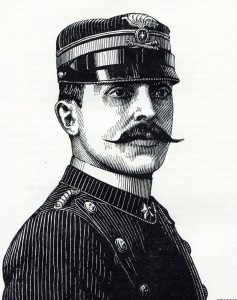
- Born: October 13, 1853; Potenza, Basilicata, Two Sicilies
- Died: March 1, 1896 (aged 42); Adwa, Tigray, Ethiopia
- Education: Royal Academy of Turin
- Military career
- Allegiance: Italy
- Branch: Royal Italian Army
- Service years: 1875 – 1896
- Rank: Major
- Commands: 1st Artillery Brigade
- Conflicts: First Italo-Ethiopian War: Battle of Adwa †
- Awards: Gold Medal of Military Valor (posthumous)

Francesco De Rosa (1853-1896) was an Italian major of the First Italo-Ethiopian War. He commanded the 1st Artillery Brigade during the Battle of Adwa and was a posthumous recipient of the Gold Medal of Military Valor for his brave service in the battle before being killed in action.

== Early military career ==
He was born in Potenza on October 13, 1853 as the son of Nicola and Elisabetta Palese. He was admitted to attend the Military Academy of Modena in the infantry and cavalry classes from November 1871. The following year he transferred to the Royal Academy of Turin in the artillery classes before graduating as a Second Lieutenant on July 25, 1875, entering into service at the 11th Artillery Regiment. After attending the Weapon Application School, he was promoted to lieutenant in May 1877 and assigned to the mountain artillery specialty. Having become captain on May 10, 1883, he was admitted to attend the Army War College at the end of which he entered service at the General Staff, and then at the 10th Artillery Regiment.

== Service in Eritrea ==
He was then sent to Eritrea on November 2, 1887 and assigned to the 1st Battery of the 7th Artillery Brigade of the Royal Colonial Corps of Eritrea. He took part in the reconquest of the fort of Saati on February 1, 1888, of which he then assumed command, returning to his homeland in February 1889 after the unfortunate action of Saganeiti. He was promoted to major on October 10, 1895 and he took over the management of the foundry in Naples but asked to return to Eritrea.

== First Italo-Ethiopian War ==
On February 14, 1896 he left for Massawa, where he assumed command of the indigenous artillery formed by the 1st (Captain Henry) and 2nd Battery, assigned to the indigenous Brigade of Major General Matteo Albertone. On February 27, at the Saurià camp, the 1st Mountain Artillery Brigade was set up with which it reached about three kilometers from the hill of Chidane Meret in the early hours of March 1.

With 14 75B Mont. pieces arranged, he began precise shooting, even with machine guns, against the Ethiopian attacking formations that caused serious losses to the enemy, but when the Ethiopian troops from Abba Garima and Amba Scelledà hit the batteries, now without ammunition, he remained on the front line fighting hand to hand until he was killed with his men in fierce fighting. To honor his courage, he was posthumously awarded the Silver Medal for Military Valor and later, the Gold Medal.

== Legacy ==
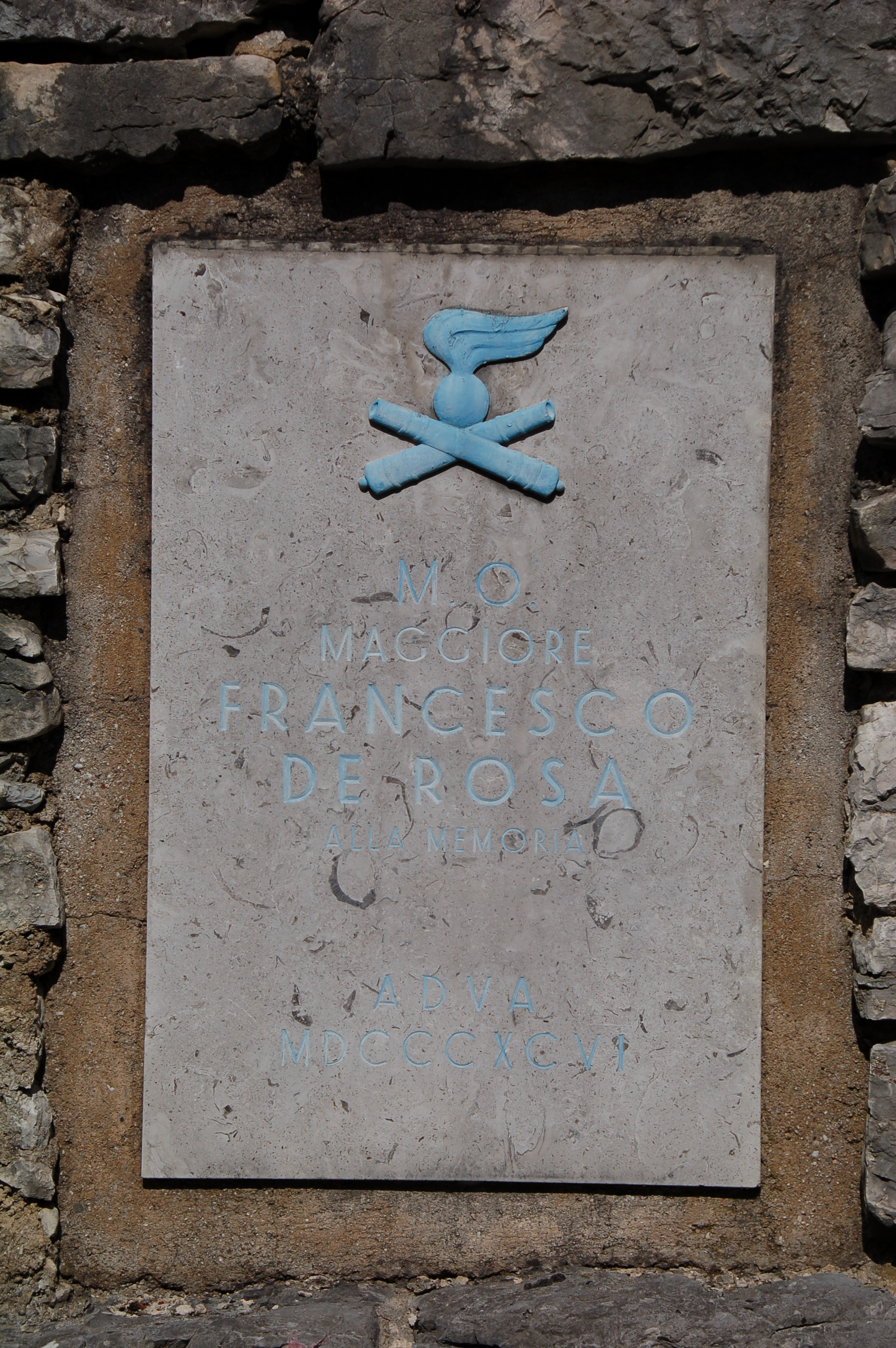
A commemorative plaque of Major De Rosa at Rovereto.

The city of Potenza has dedicated a military barracks to him. Another barracks named after him was in L'Aquila, in the Quarto San Marciano but was demolished after the war as only remnants remain currently.

== Awards ==
- Gold Medal of Military Valor

Commander of the artillery of the brigade Albertone (indigenous) distinguished himself during the whole fight in directing the fire of his batteries with singular intelligence and effectiveness. Serene and undaunted, he heroically sacrificed his own life and that of his gods to remain with the two white batteries to protect the other troops. Adua (Eritrea), March 1, 1896.

- Silver Medal of Military Valor

He stayed with his batteries until the last moment in position. In the most pressing moments of the fight, he directed the fire at a short distance with serenity of mind and courage, remaining dead in the field
