= Matteo Albertone =

Italian general during Battle of Adwa (1840–1919)

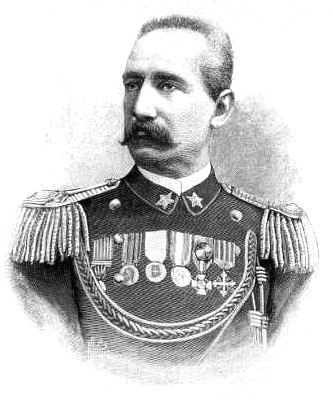
- Born: 29 March 1840; Alessandria, Kingdom of Sardinia
- Died: 13 February 1919 (aged 78) Rome, Kingdom of Italy
- Allegiance: Kingdom of Italy
- Branch: Royal Italian Army
- Service years: 1861–1897
- Rank: Major General
- Conflicts: First Italo-Ethiopian War; Battle of Adwa (POW)
- Awards: Silver Medal of Military Valor (2)

Matteo Francesco Albertone OCI (29 March 1840 – 13 February 1919) was an Italian general, mostly known for his role during the First Italo-Ethiopian War. He led the Native Brigade during the battle of Adwa and was taken prisoner by the Ethiopians.

== Early life ==
Born in Alessandria when the town was still in Sardinia-Piedmont, he graduated from the Military Academy in Turin shortly after the proclamation of the Kingdom of Italy in 1861. Appointed sub-lieutenant in the Bersaglieri, he fought in the 1866 Austro-Italian War and in the capture of Rome in 1870. In the following years he was appointed captain in the Army Staff and started teaching logistics at the School of War. In 1888 he was assigned to the Special Operation Corps of Alessandro Asinari di San Marzano in Eritrea and took command of the 1st Cacciatori d'Africa Regiment. When the Corps was disbanded, he was reassigned to garrison duties in Massawa until 1890.

== First Italo-Ethiopian War ==
Albertone returned in Eritrea in 1895, when the tensions upon diverging interpretations of the Treaty of Wuchale between Italy and Ethiopia escalated into the First Italo-Ethiopian War. When the fighting started the Italian forces were divided into two operational Corps, one in Adigrat and the other in Mek'ele: the latter, almost entirely composed by ascari under general Arimondi, won the victory at Coatit, the opening engagement of the war. The Italian then invaded Tigray, while Menelik II was slowly gathering his forces in Addis Abeba. By November, when the negus finally started marching towards Italian positions, the occupation was complete, and a line of outposts and pickets was established on the borders. Realizing Menelik forces greatly outnumbered those units, Baratieri ordered a preemptive retreat. His conflictual relationship with Arimondi, however, led to the massacre of Toselli's column at the Amba Alagi and the loss of the isolated Fort of Mek'ele (Macallè in Italian sources) after a two-weeks siege.

As the situation deteriorated, Baratieri reorganized his command: Albertone received command of the highly respected Native Brigade, formed with troops that served in the 2nd operational Corps, while Arimondi was moved to the I Infantry Brigade, a mixed formation that mostly comprised Italian units recently shipped from Italy. By mid February 1896, the Italian expeditionary force concentrated on the Sauria hills, near Adwa, a small settlement where the Ethiopian army was encamped.

== Battle of Adwa ==
By 27 February, both the Italian and the Ethiopian armies had only a few days of supply left. Unable or unwilling to decide between a temporary withdrawal or a small advance, Baratieri asked for the advice of his brigade commanders: Giuseppe Arimondi, Albertone, Vittorio Dabormida and the newly appointed Giuseppe Ellena. Albertone informed his commander that, according to native informants, the Ethiopians were scattered across the hills of Adwa, foraging. This was later proved to be wrong, but, with Arimondi's mistaken estimate of Menelik's forces, it suggested to the commanders that Baratieri was moving away from an easy victory. Following Arimondi, Albertone urged an aggressive attack and was soon joined by his colleagues.

With the officers urging an attack and pressed by telegrams from Crispi, Baratieri decided to advance towards Adwa. The 29 February he ordered the field force to redeploy with a night march. Albertone and the Native Brigade, on the left, was to occupy the Kidane Meret peak, Dabormida, on the right, the mountain of the Rebbi Arienni and Arimondi, with the center, again the Rebbi Arienni, in a less prominent position. The reserve brigade of General Ellena was stationed behind Arimondi.

=== Night march ===
At 21:30 of 29 February, the brigades of Albertone, Arimondi and Dabormida were on their way, each following different roads. Baratieri and his staff, with Ellena's brigade, was to follow Arimondi, three hours later.

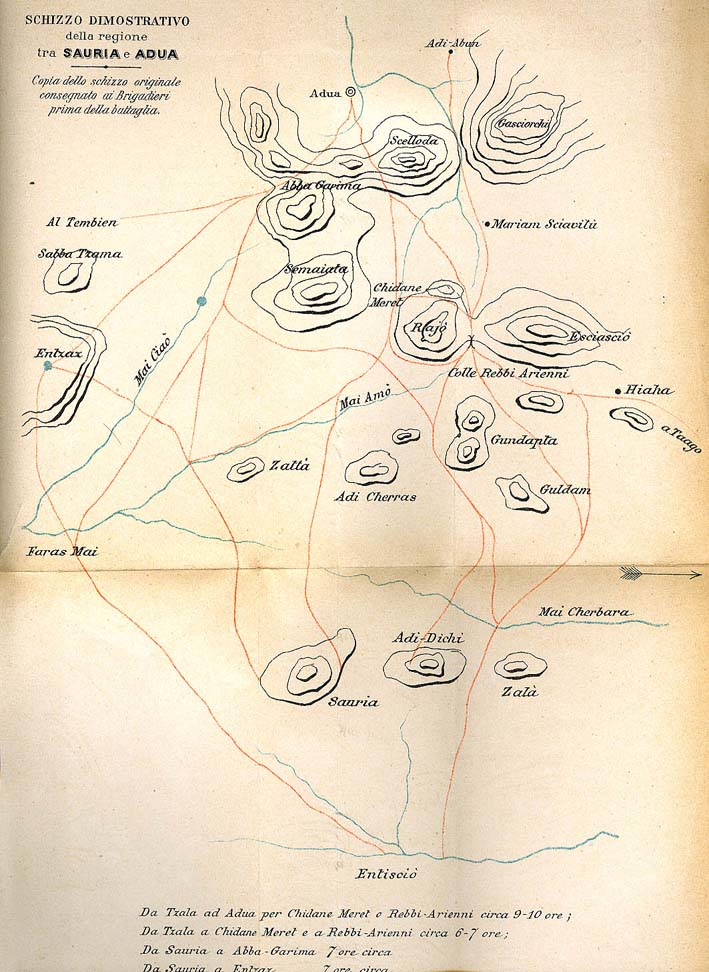
The faulty map given to Italian brigadiers at Adwa, that shows "Mount Kidane Meret" (Monte Chidane Meret)

At midnight it was found that the paths followed by Albertone and Arimondi were converging. Albertone took the lead, forcing Arimondi to stop for an entire hour. Since the Native Brigade marched faster than the two others, by 3:30 a.m. Albertone reached his intended position, on what he thought was the Kidane Meret. His guides, though, informed him that the brigade was on Erarà Hill. After an hour, not seeing Arimondi coming into line on his right as he expected, Albertone deemed that he was on the wrong position and decided to resume the march toward the real Kidane Meret, 6.4 km (4 mi) away.

=== Menelik's first attack ===
Albertone's move opened a wide gap in the Italian lines, and isolated his brigade from Arimondi and Dabormida. By 5:30 a.m., at sunrise, while the two Italian brigades deployed on the Rebbi Arienni, from his position overlooking the Mariam Shavitu valley Albertone sighted the Ethiopian camp. Convincing himself that Baratieri wanted him to threaten those positions, he sent forward the 1st Native Battalion of major Turitto to scout the ground. Around 6 p.m. the advanced battalion came under heavy attacks from nearby Ethiopian troops, and Menelik was rapidly binging fresh forces to this side. The assault was so fierce that it reached the Italian second line, and the entire Native Brigade was forced to retreat, protected by the fire of Albertone's two mountain artillery batteries. At 6:45 Baratieri, who heard the sound of the fighting, ordered Dabormida to advance in support of Albertone, whom he assumed to be at the false Kidane Meret, a little ahead. Once Dabormida discovered the Native Brigade was further away, he continued to slowly march westwards, reaching the Mariam Shavitu valley 3 miles north of Albertone's positions.

=== Mount Semaiata ===
By 7:00 a.m. Albertone was arraying his remaining battalions on the nearby Mount Semaiata, leaving Turitto and the two batteries on the Kidane Meret to cover his movements. He wrote a message to Baratieri, informing him that he was under heavy attack and in dire need of reinforcements: it would reach the commander only at 8:15. From 7:30, the 1st Native Battalion held off increasing numbers of enemy troops until 8:30, when it was forced to retreat. At this time, about 18,000 Ethiopians were converging on Albertone's brigade in a half moon formation, trying to encircle it, and the strong Ethiopian northern wing occupied Mount Gusoso, cutting any existing link between Albertone and Dabormida's relief attempt. For about two hours, the ascari under Albertone held their position, the artillery inflicting heavy casualties on the attackers, but then the Ethiopians set up quick-firing batteries on the Kidane Meret. While Menelik was committing more troops from his own command, the badly mauled flanks of the Native Brigade collapsed, and by 10:30 the whole brigade, low on ammunition, started a fighting retreat that soon turned into a rout. The batteries that tried to cover the withdrawal were captured, retaken by ascari with a bayonet charge, then definitely lost, their crews annihilated. Albertone was captured leading his troops, and his brigade was shattered shortly afterwards.

== Last years ==
After being held prisoner by the Ethiopians for fourteen months, he was freed under the terms of the treaty of Addis Abeba and returned to Italy in July 1897. After commanding for two months the "Re" (lit. King's Own) Brigade, he retired from the Army at his request. For his valiant deeds during the battle of Adwa, Albertone received the Silver Medal of Military Valour in 1898. He died peacefully and almost forgotten in Rome, in 1919.

== Awards and decorations ==
- Silver Medal of Military Valor – Adwa, 1 March 1896
- Silver Medal of Military Valor – Bosco Monticchio, 29 July 1864
- Commander of the Order of the Crown of Italy
