= Siege of Mekelle =

1896 battle of the First Italo-Ethiopian War

- Part of the First Italo-Ethiopian War
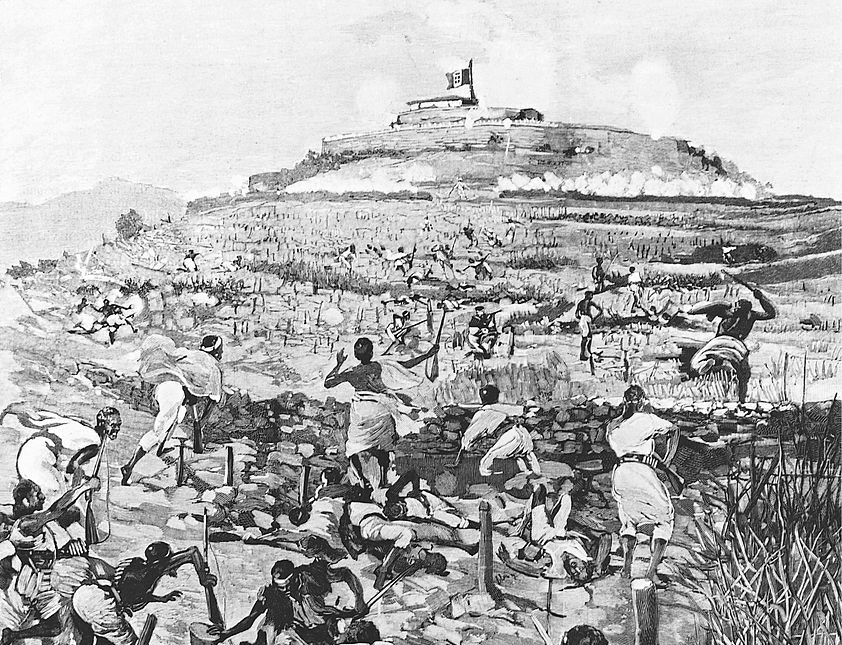
- Ethiopian troops attacking the besieged Italians
Date	7–21 January 1896
Location	Mek'ele, Ethiopia
Result	Ethiopian victory

Belligerents
Italy	Ethiopia

Commanders and leaders
(Kingdom of Italy) Giuseppe Galliano	(Ethiopian Empire) Menelik II

Strength
1,306 (1,114 Askari & 192 Italians); 2 mountain guns	27,000

Casualties and losses
35 killed 78 wounded	~600 killed

The siege of Mekelle, sometimes known as the battle of Mekelle, took place in January 1896 during the First Italo-Ethiopian War. Italian forces surrendered a partially completed fort at Mekelle, a city in the northern Tigray Region of Ethiopia which they had occupied since 1895, to Ethiopian forces.

== Battle ==
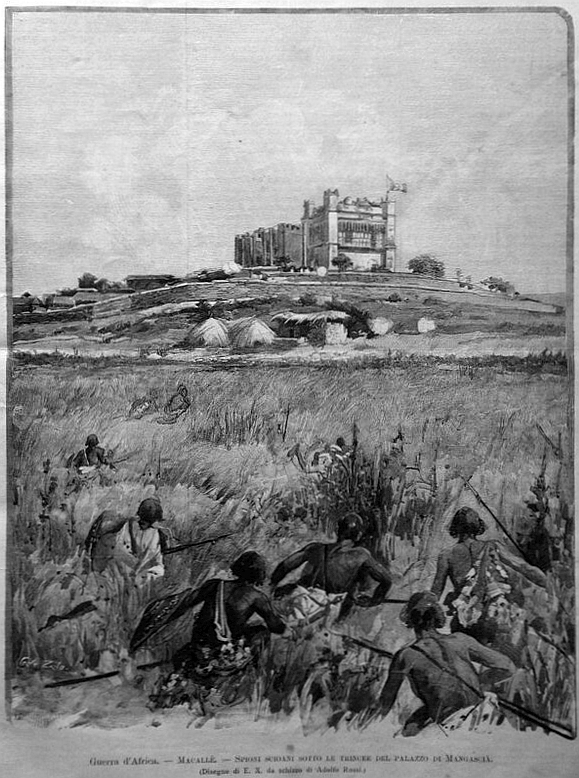
Shewan warriors in the trenches of Ras Mengesha Yohannes' palace

The Italians numbered 20 officers, 13 non-commissioned officers, and 150 privates, they were supported by 1,000 Askari and two mountain guns. The Ethiopian army numbered around 27,000 men.

The first troops of Ras Makonnen's vanguard reached Mekele around December 15th; Galliano attempted to gain time by initiating diplomatic negotiations with Makonnen, but on December 20th the ras broke off negotiations. He then launched a frontal attack against the Italians which was repelled with heavy losses, 500 Ethiopians died on the mountain and numerous others were wounded, including Ras Makonnen. Among the Italians, however, only six dead and nine wounded.

On the morning of 7 January 1896, the defenders of the fort spotted a huge red tent among the besiegers, showing that the emperor had arrived. After two weeks of bombardment by Ethiopian artillery and very costly attacks on the Italian positions, the Ethiopians managed to cut off the fort's water supply and then fought off desperate Italian attempts to retake the well. On 19 January 1896, the fort's commander, Major Galliano, whose men were dying of dehydration, raised the white flag of surrender. Major Galliano and his men were allowed to march out, surrender their arms and to go free. Menelik stated he allowed the Italians to go free as "to give proof of my Christian faith," saying his quarrel was with the Italian government of Prime Minister Francesco Crispi that was trying to conquer his nation and not the ordinary Italian soldiers.
