= Italo-Ethiopian War of 1887–1889 =

1887–1889 conflict with Ethiopia during the Italian colonization of East Africa

- Part of the Scramble for Africa
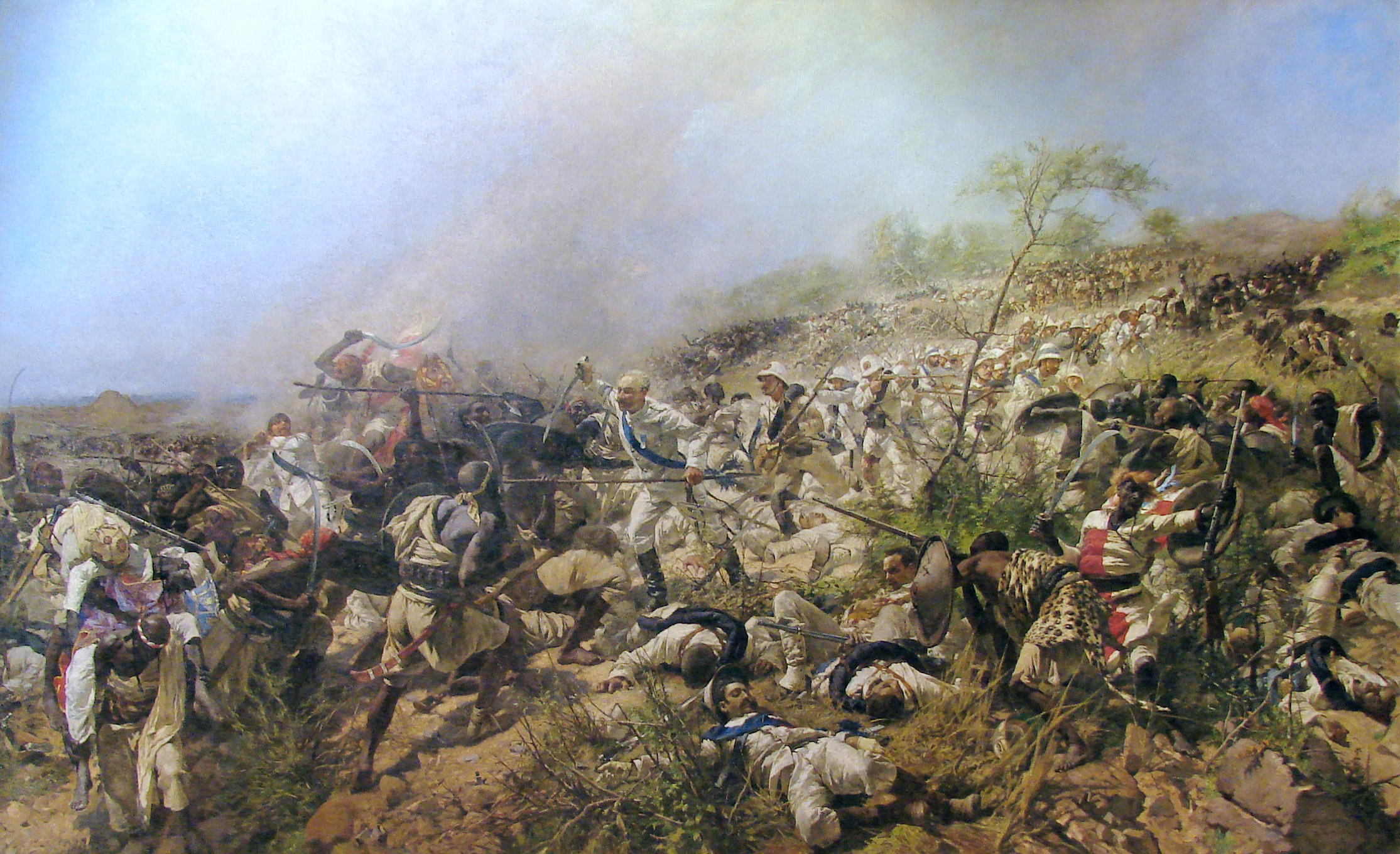
- Battle of Dogali; Michele Cammarano, 1896
Date	24 January 1887 – 2 May 1889
Location	Mereb Melash, Ethiopian Empire (now Eritrea)
Result	Treaty of Wuchale
Territorial changes	Establishment of Italian Eritrea

Belligerents
Kingdom of Italy	Ethiopian Empire

Commanders and leaders
(Kingdom of Italy) A. A. di San Marzano (Kingdom of Italy) Tancredi Saletta (Kingdom of Italy) Antonio Baldissera (Kingdom of Italy) Oreste Baratieri (Kingdom of Italy) Tommaso De Cristoforis †	Yohannes IV; Ras Alula; Ras Mengesha; Ras Mikael

The Italo-Ethiopian War of 1887–1889 was an undeclared war between the Kingdom of Italy and the Ethiopian Empire occurring during the Italian colonization of Eritrea, then a province of the Ethiopian Empire under the name of Mereb Melash. The conflict ended with the treaty of Wuchale, which delimited the border between Ethiopia and Italian Eritrea. The treaty also contained clauses whose different interpretations led to another Italo-Ethiopian War.

The Emperor Yohannes IV had to face internal resistance from his powerful vassals. King Menelik of Shewa signed a treaty of neutrality with Italy in October 1887. As the Mahdist uprising in Sudan spilled over the frontier, Ethiopia was faced with a two-front war. In early 1888, Yohannes decided to prioritize fighting against the Mahdists. In March 1889, Yohannes died while he was fighting the Mahdists during the Battle of Gallabat. Menelik claimed the throne after the death of Yohannes and signed the Treaty of Wuchale with Italy in May 1889.

While there is universal agreement that the war began in January 1887, historians differ about when it ended. Some limit the war to 1887, others extend it down to the Treaty of Wuchale in 1889, and others combine it with the Italo-Ethiopian War of 1895–1896 and treat a single conflict as occurring from 1887 until 1896. The naming of the conflict also varies. It may be called the First Italo-Ethiopian War and the war of 1895–1896 as the Second Italo-Ethiopian War. Otherwise it may be identified solely by date.

Italian historiography tends to group together all the fighting from 1885 until 1896. The original name for the fighting was Guerra d'Africa (African War), a term which indicates the broad perceived scope of early Italian colonial ambitions. As the Italian historian Giuseppe Finaldi puts it, "The war is called the Guerra d'Africa, not the Guerra d'Eritrea or such like."

== Background ==
The first Italian colony in what was to become the colony of Eritrea was Assab Bay, purchased by Giuseppe Sapeto on behalf of the Società di Navigazione Rubattino (Rubattino Shipping Company) on 15 November 1869 from the brothers Ibrahim and Hassan Ben Ahmed for 6,000 Maria Theresa thalers. The Suez Canal opened two days later. The deal was later finalised for 8,350 thalers and with the Sultan Abd Allah Sahim as a party. On 11 March 1870, Sapeto purchased the Bay of Buya from the same brothers and sultan. Between 15 April 1870 and December 1879, however, Assab went unused by the company. The company offered it to the Italian government, which on 5 July 1882 passed a law making it Italy's first colony.

The outbreak of the Mahdist uprising changed the political situation in the Horn of Africa. Egypt was unable to maintain its garrison in Massawa and, with British approval, an Italian Corpo Speciale per l'Africa (Special Corps for Africa), commanded by Colonel Tancredi Saletta, occupied it on 5 February 1885.

== Campaign ==
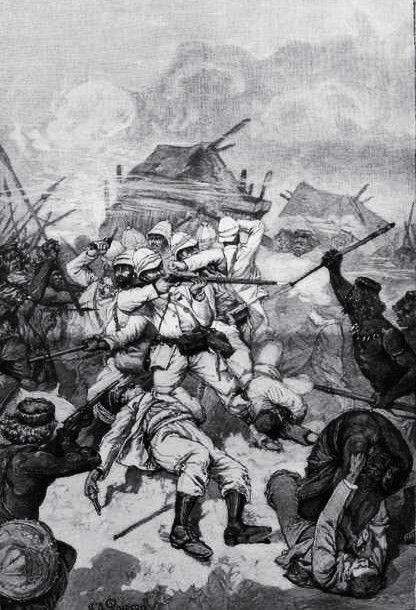
Illustration of the Siege of Saati

=== Early clashes ===
Italy moved into the hinterland of Massawa, territory claimed by Ethiopia, and brought her forces into conflict with those of Ethiopia, specifically those of Ras Alula, governor of Mareb Mellash.

On 24 or 25 January 1887, Alula attacked the Italian fort at Saati. In the ensuing skirmish, his troops were beaten back. On 26 January, an Ethiopian force of about 15,000 men ambushed an Italian battalion sent to reinforce Saati and almost annihilated it at Dogali, 10 miles (16 km) west of Massawa. The battle of Dogali turned out to be one of the most important in the history of modern Ethiopia. Alula did not follow up his victory, preferring to wait for permission from Yohannes to continue. He entered Asmara on 31 January 1887.

The response to Dogali in Italy was immediate. The Italian parliament voted 5,000,000 lire for troops to reinforce Massawa. An Italian force was sent to garrison the interior, while Yohannes IV withdrew his forces to avoid confrontation. Disease ravaged the Italian troops and they were pulled out in March 1887, ending the first phase of the war.

Following his victory, Alula remained in contact with the Italians regarding prisoners. He also subjected Massawa to a landward blockade in an effort to completely cut off its trade with the hinterland. This angered the local Muslim traders, whose sympathies shifted towards the Italians.

In his attack on Saati, Alula had acted entirely on his own initiative. The Emperor Yohannes was at Mekelle during the battle of Dogali. When Alula requested permission to expel the Italians from Massawa, the emperor is said to have castigated him for making war without permission: "Who gave you permission to go and make war there? Those soldiers are not yours but mine; I shall cut off your hand." In late March, Yohannes summoned Alula to Mekelle, where he was more conciliatory. He promised the ras reinforcements against any Italian counterattack but forbade offensive operations.

=== Reinforcements and diplomatic moves ===
On 2 June 1887, the Italian parliament voted a further 200,000,000 lire for troops, ammunition and supplies to be sent to Massawa. During the summer, an expeditionary force of 20,000 men was assembled in Italy. It landed in Massawa on November 8 under the command of Alessandro Asinari di San Marzano.

With Yohannes weakened, Menelik of Shewa and King Tekle Haymanot of Gojjam entered into an alliance against him. In retaliation, the emperor crossed into Gojjam in early August 1887 and devastated it. The following month, he ordered Menelik to bar communications with Assab through Aussa. In response, Menelik sent letters to both the emperor and the Italians offering to mediate, as he had done after Dogali.

Already in late August 1887, Menelik had received the Italian diplomat Pietro Antonelli in Shewa to negotiate an alliance against Yohannes. Italy requested a small piece of territory in the interior in which to garrison their troops during the summer. Antonelli also gave Menelik Italy's justifications for a punitive expedition to avenge Dogali. On 19 September, Antonelli proposed a treaty of neutrality with Shewa in exchange for munitions. A draft of this treaty survives. Nevertheless, in early October 1887, Yohannes wrote to Matewos, bishop of Shewa, who was with the Shewan court at Mount Entoto, that he was determined to go to war against Italy.

On 20 October 1887, however, Menelik signed a secret treaty with Antonelli guaranteeing his neutrality in return for arms. Within six months he was to receive 5,000 Remington rifles. In the treaty, Italy renounced any intention of annexing Ethiopian territory.

In September 1887, Alula invaded Damot with a Tigrayan army. With their ras away, the Tigrayan chiefs made contact with the Italians. On 11 November 1887, Gerald Portal, the British consul at Cairo, met Alula at Asmara. He then met Yohannes encamped by Lake Ashangi on 7 December. He conveyed to the emperor his government's opinion that the attack on Saati had been "unjust" and urged that Alula be removed as governor of Mareb Mellash. Yohannes refused to concede anything to the Italians: "If they cannot live there [at Massawa] without Saati, let them go." He also defended Ras Alula, saying that "[he] did no wrong; the Italians came into the province under his governorship and he fought them, just as you [the British] would fight the Abyssinians [Ethiopians] if they came to England."

=== Escalation and conclusion of the conflict ===
In December 1887, Yohannes had ordered Menelik to guard Wollo and Begemder, while Ras Mikael brought up 25,000 Oromo cavalry to Tigray. In January 1888, the Italians had moved two brigades up to Dogali. Yohannes mobilised for war. On February 1 the Italian troops re-occupied Saati. The Italian forces under San Marzano (estimated at 20,000 men) faced with caution the larger Ethiopian army under Yohannes (estimated at 80,000 men), adopting a Fabian strategy to avoid open battle and prevent the opponent to launch an offensive. Criticized by some at home for his cautious conduct, San Marzano achieved the objectives of recovering abandoned territories, retaining them, and constructing the Moncullo-Saati railway.

Facing a Mahdist invasion in the west, Yohannes abandoned his campaign in March. Paul Henze suggests that "personal antipathy to Islam and desire to see the Mahdist rebellion contained must ... have carried weight in his decision to give priority to the war against the Mahdists over defense against Italian encroachment." In February–March 1888 Menelik, on Yohannes' orders, marched his army west to Gondar to defend it from the Mahdists. He did not arrive in time and Gondar was sacked.

With Yohannes out of the fighting against Italy, Alula withdrew from Asmara in early April 1888 and retreated to Adwa on 23 April. Although Asmara was left undefended, the Italians did not move on it. In May 1888, the Italian expeditionary force in the north withdrew, having never progressed far from the coast. The rifles promised to Menelik in the treaty of October arrived in Assab that same month, but were withheld. In order to free up the weapons, Menelik signed a second treaty with Antonelli in early July 1888. He also made an alliance with Tekle Haymanot against Yohannes, who ravaged Gojjam in early August. The emperor was joined by Alula in September. The Italians then supplied the promised arms to Menelik in case the emperor followed through on his threat to invade Shewa. With Ethiopia on the verge of civil war, an Italian expedition sent by general Baldissera occupied Keren on 6 February 1889, leaving their ally Cafel in charge. Baldissera also obtainted the support of Dejazmach Dabbab Araya, governor of Akele Guzay, who occupied Asmara with his own forces on 9 February 1889.

Following the death of Yohannes IV in the Battle of Gallabat against the Mahdists on 10/11 March 1889, Menelik and Mengesha Yohannes claimed the position of Emperor. Alula supported Mengesha, while Italy supported Menelik and signed with him the treaty of Wuchale, confirming the Italian acquisitions in Mareb Mellash. Dabbab was imprisoned by Alula and Mengesha while Cafel switched sides, thus Baldissera sent Italian forces to occupy once more Keren and Asmara (in June and August 1889 respectively). In November, Menelik was crowned Emperor. In 1890, the Italians formally established the colony of Eritrea in the territory they had occupied.

== Treaty of Wuchale ==
In the vacuum that followed the death of Yohannes IV in the Battle of Gallabat against the Mahdists on 10/11 March 1889, General Antonio Baldissera occupied the highlands along the Eritrean coast and Italy proclaimed the establishment of the new colony of Italian Eritrea. The Italian possession of maritime areas previously claimed by Ethiopia was formalized on 2 May 1889 with the signing of the Treaty of Wuchale with the new emperor, Menelik of Shewa, a compromise that allowed the Italians to retain their acquisitions on the Red Sea. Menelik recognized the Italian occupation of his rivals' lands of Bogos, Hamasien, Akkele Guzay and Serae in exchange for guarantees of financial assistance and continuing access to European arms and ammunition.

== Casualties ==
Both sides had taken large losses. Sources about the Italian casualties reported 430 killed at Dogali and 1,000 overall, while the Ethiopians suffered perhaps as little as 400 overall or as much as 1,071 at Dogali alone.

== Sources ==
- Battaglia, Roberto (1958). La prima guerra d'Africa. Milan.
- Caulk, Richard Alan (2002). "Between the Jaws of Hyenas": A Diplomatic History of Ethiopia, 1876–1896. Wiesbaden: Harrassowitz Verlag.
- Clodfelter, Micheal (2017). Warfare and Armed Conflicts: A Statistical Encyclopedia of Casualty and Other Figures (4th ed.). McFarland.
- Cucca, Carlo (1887). "La guerra in Africa, all'Asmara". Bollettino della Società Africana d'Italia. 6: 252–258.
- Erlich, Haggai (1973). A Political Biography of Ras Alula 1875–1897 (PhD thesis). University of London, School of Oriental and African Studies.
- Finaldi, Giuseppe Maria (2009). Italian National Identity in the Scramble for Africa: Italy's African Wars in the Era of Nation-Building, 1870–1900. Bern: Peter Lang.
- Finaldi, Giuseppe Maria (2011). "Italo-Abyssinian Wars (1887–1896, 1935–1936)". The Encyclopedia of War. Wiley. doi:10.1002/9781444338232.wbeow311. ISBN 9781405190374.
- Gabre-Selassie, Zewde (2005). "Continuity and Discontinuity in Menelik's Foreign Policy". In Paulos Milkias; Getachew Metaferia (eds.). The Battle of Adwa: Reflections on Ethiopia's Historic Victory Against European Colonialism. New York: Algora.
- Gleditsch, Kristian Skrede (2004). "A Revised List of Wars between and within Independent States, 1816–2002". International Interactions. 30 (3): 231–262. doi:10.1080/03050620490492150. S2CID 145015824.
- Gorra, Oreste (1895). Guerra d'Africa, 1895. Rome: Perino.
- Henze, Paul B. (2000). Layers of Time: A History of Ethiopia. New York: Palgrave.
- Jaques, Tony (2007). Battles and Sieges: A Guide to 8,500 Battles from Antiquity through the Twenty-First Century. Vol. 1. Westport, CT: Greenwood Press.
- Kohn, George Childs (2007) [1986]. Dictionary of Wars (3rd ed.). New York: Facts on File.
- Labanca, Nicola (1993). In marcia verso Adua. Giulio Einaudi.
- Marcus, Harold G. (1995). The Life and Times of Menelik II, Ethiopia, 1844–1913. Lawrenceville, NJ: Red Sea Press.
- Pakenham, Thomas (1991). The Scramble for Africa: White Man's Conquest of the Dark Continent from 1876 to 1912. Random House.
- Phillips, Charles; Axelrod, Alan (2005). Encyclopedia of Wars. New York: Facts on File.
- Piccinini, Giuseppe (1887–1888). Guerra d'Africa. 4 vols. Rome: Perino.
- Sarkees, Meredith Reid; Wayman, Frank Whelon (2010). Resort to War: A Data Guide to Inter-State, Extra-state, Intra-State, and Non-State Wars, 1816–2007. Washington, D.C.: CQ Press.
- Shinn, David H.; Ofcansky, Thomas P. (2013). Historical Dictionary of Ethiopia. Scarecrow Press.
- Singer, J. David; Small, Melvin (1994). Correlates of War Project: International and Civil War Data, 1816–1992 (PDF). Ann Arbor, MI: Inter-university Consortium for Political and Social Research.
- Tripodi, Paolo (1999). "An Historical Perspective on Italian Colonialism". The Colonial Legacy in Somalia. Rome and Mogadishu: From Colonial Administration to Operation Restore Hope. Macmillan and St. Martin's Press. pp. 9–48.
