= Battle of Kufit =

Battle between Ethiopian and Mahdist Sudanese forces

- Part of the Mahdist War, Agar Maqnat
Date	22–23 September 1885
Location	Kufit, Hamasien, Italian Eritrea (between Kassala and Keren)
Result	Ethiopian victory

Belligerents
Ethiopian Empire	Mahdist Sudan

Commanders and leaders
Ras Alula (WIA); Belatta Gabru †	Osman Digna

Strength
10,000–25,000 troops	6,000–12,000 troops

Casualties and losses
1,500 killed 300–500 wounded	3,000–10,000 killed

The Battle of Kufit was a military engagement fought on 22–23 September 1885, between the Mahdist Sudanese led by Osman Digna and Imperial Ethiopian forces led by Ras Alula at the town of Kufit. This fighting resulted in the defeat of the Mahdists, stabilizing the Sudanese-Ethiopian border, though the Mahdists continued to raid the border until 1889 and the Italians took advantage of the Sudanese-Ethiopian fighting to establish a colony in Eritrea.

== Background ==
After the British occupied Egypt in 1882, they also inherited the then ongoing Mahdist uprising; After the Mahdists defeated a force led by Hicks Pasha in the Battle of Shaykan, the British decided to abandon Sudan until they were in position to re-conquer it. To avoid getting their garrisons in Sudan completely surrounded by two enemies—the Mahdists and Ethiopians—the British signed the Hewett Treaty with the Emperor Yohannes IV in 1884, returning some territories in exchange for Ethiopian military support to evacuate the Egyptian garrisons in the area via the port of Massawa.

After the garrisons of Gallabat, Amadib, Gura and Sanhit were successfully evacuated from November 1884 to July 1885, the British offered the Emperor 10,000 rifles to relieve the garrison at Kassala; Yohannes IV then sent Ras Alula to help with the evacuation—who sent an expedition in September 1885—but the town had already fallen to the Mahdists on 30 July, 1885.

Meanwhile, the Mahdist general Osman Digna was informed of the Ethiopian military preparations, subsequently leaving his headquarters in Tamai on 13 August 1885 for Kassala in order to prepare an invasion on Ethiopia, against the wishes of The Khalifa, who wanted Digna to invade the British-controlled port city of Suakin instead. After arriving in Kassala Osman Digna recruited as many local tribesmen as he could and pressed some prisoners of war into service before departing to Kufit on 12 September 1885.

== Battle ==
Ras Alula's army size varies according to sources: the British estimated as 8,000 strong, an Italian interpreter gave a total 10,000 warriors—all armed with Remington rifles, while the Mahdists estimated a total of 20,000 warriors. Ras Alula's forces also had some Beni-Amer warriors. After departing for Kufit, the army was divided in three columns: a cavalry force led by Belatta Gabru, Alula's lieutenant and Sanhit governor, on the front, Alula himself and the infantry on the rear, and a cavalry column in the wing.

Osman Digna had an army 6,000–12,000 strong entrenched in the town of Kufit, composed of locally recruited Ja'alin, al-Halāniqa, a few Hadendowa warriors and some bashi bazouks from the Egyptian garrison of Kassala. Three days before the battle, Ras Alula's scouts reported that the fort at Kufit was defended by 3,000 dervishes, an "underestimation that proved to be very dangerous", in the words of professor Haggai Erlich.

On 22 September 1885, Bellata Gabru led a failed direct assault against the Mahdist fort, ignoring Alula's orders to outflank the enemy and the broken terrain—according to Erlich, the Egyptian envoy Marcopoli Bey promised to pay Gabru the sum of $1,000 ($35,833 in 2025) if "he could assist Kassala before the arrival of Alula."—the Ethiopian and Beni-Amer cavalry quickly found their charge broken by the uneven terrain while 3,000 Madhist riflemen fired upon them. According to Sir Francis Reginald Wingate, the Mahdist spearmen left their trenches and charged, killing Gabru, seven other chieftains and several Ethiopians. Upon receiving the news of Gabru's death from the failed charge survivors, Ras Alula himself led an unsuccessful charge upon the Mahdist fortifications. After engaging in melee combat, Alula's horse was killed; his nephew brought him another horse and they managed to withdraw and rally the remnants of the imperial army.

Lightly wounded, Ras Alula ordered his troops to outflank the Mahdist trenches in a pincer maneuver; Taken by surprise or overconfident after their previous successes against the Ethiopians and possibly running low on ammunition, the Mahdists left their trenches and launched an counterattack aimed at the center of Alula's army; Meanwhile, Ras Alula reorganized his main force into a phalanx, while his cavalry encircled the enemy and after four hours of combat, the Mahdists broke ranks and fled. About 3,000 dervishes were reportedly killed with other sources giving a total of 5,000–10,000 dead, including nearly all their emirs with the exception of Osman Digna. The Ethiopians also suffered substantial losses, with no less than 1,500 dead including 40 officers, plus 300–500 wounded.

After Kufit, Ras Alula halted his advance towards Kassala and withdrew. Several theories were raised about his motives including: rainy weather, the number of casualties he suffered combined with disease spreading among his troops, fear of triggering hostile action by the neighbouring Habbab tribe which was cooperating with the Italians, or that Alula—unaware that the garrison had fallen to the enemy—believed that word of his victory would be enough to break the Mahdist siege. According to Erlich, Ras Alula never intended to help evacuate the Kassala garrison, considering his expedition as a defensive measure against the Mahdist threat. Another theory, raised by British officers in The Anglo-Egyptian Sudan: A Compendium is that Alula refused to take part in further operations to relieve Egyptian garrisons, as the Ethiopians considered the British handover of Massawa to the Italians on 6 February 1885 as a violation of the Hewett Treaty.

Returning to Senhit and later to his new headquarters in Asmara, Alula worked on forming a coalition of anti-Mahdist Muslim tribes to act as a buffer zone, but with little success: while some tribes eventually submitted to him, others sought Italian protection as the Eritrean region received little to no Ethiopian support. Fearing that the Ethiopians would try to encourage local rebellions in Kassala, Osman Digna ordered the execution of several Egyptian officers kept as prisoners of war there on 30 October 1885. Part of the remaining prisoners were incorporated into the local Mahdist armies while the rest were sent back to Khartoum alongside 6,000 loads of loot carried on camels.

== Aftermath ==
Ras Alula victory in Kufit was a setback for the Mahdists, denying them access to the Red Sea and weakening Osman Digna, who faced difficulties replacing his losses, effectively stabilizing the Sudanese-Ethiopian border. While Mahdism would never challenge the Eritrean Muslim sects again, its followers continued to launch raids on the Metemma and Gondar regions throughout 1896–1899; in the short run, the Ethiopians forestalled the Mahdist invasion while also obtaining the firearms they needed to resist the Italians.

According to Haggai Erlich, in the long run the Italians were the winners of Kufit, as the fighting between the Ethiopians and Sudanese bought them time to establish their colony in Eritrea and secure alliances with local tribes such as the Habbab and Beni-Amer.
