= Siege of Saati =

First battle of the Italo-Ethiopian War of 1887–1889

- Part of Italo-Ethiopian War of 1887–1889
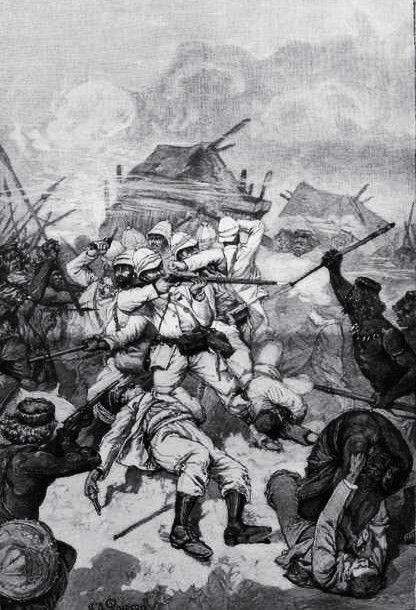
- Italians repel the Ethiopian surprise attack at Saati.
Date	January 25, 1887
Location	Saati, Ethiopian Empire (now in Eritrea)
Result	Italian victory

Belligerents
Kingdom of Italy	Ethiopian Empire

Commanders and leaders
Giovanni Boretti; Federico Cuomo †	Ras Alula

Strength
167 Italians; 300 Bashi-bazouk	20,000 Infantry

Casualties and losses
7 killed 3 wounded 5 missing	"Hundreds killed and wounded"

The siege of Saati, also known as battle of Saati or combat of Saati, was the first battle of the Italo-Ethiopian War of 1887–1889 between Italian colonial troops and Ethiopian forces.

== Background ==
In 1885 Italy occupied the Eritrean port of Massawa, then in Egyptian hands, and made it a base for a subsequent inland expansion. Inevitably, Italian interests clashed with those of the neighboring Ethiopian Empire which for some time had aimed at an outlet on the Red Sea. However, unlike other European powers, Italy undertook a very slow process of penetration into the Eritrean hinterland. In fact, the town of Saati, 28 km from Massawa, was occupied by two companies commanded by Major Giovanni Boretti supported by 300 Bashi-bazouk, only on January 14 1887. Then, the Italians entrenched themselves on a hill and built a small fort on it. Four days later Ras Alula wrote to Boretti asking that the men in Saati abandon their positions. On January 24, about 20,000 Ethiopians under Ras Alula's command camped 5 km from the fort of Saati.

== Battle ==
At dawn on January 25, a patrol led by Lieutenant Federico Cuomo, from Messina, was sent on reconnaissance towards the Ethiopian camp, but were surprised attacked and the Italians were forced to take refuge in the fort after a violent firefight. In the meantime Boretti became aware of an Ethiopian attempt to circumvent the Italian positions and thus began to bomb the enemy troops below.

Towards noon another patrol saw other Abyssinian troops who, having seen themselves uncovered, attacked the fort in large numbers. When the enemies reached 300 meters from the fort, the Italians opened fire. The attack lasted about four hours, after which the Ethiopians withdrew due to heavy losses.

=== Italian order of battle ===
- 9th company of the 6th Infantry Regiment
- 10th company of the 7th Infantry Regiment
- A section of the 1st Company of the 17th Artillery Rgt
- 6 buluc of Bashi-bazouk

== Aftermath ==
The battle caused the Italians 2 dead (one of them was Lieutenant Cuomo) and 2 wounded, among the Basci-bazouk 3 dead, 1 wounded and 5 missing. That same evening Boretti sent a message to the Moncullo garrison in which he urgently asked for reinforcements, ammunition and provisions. From Moncullo, on the morning of January 26, the column led by Lieutenant Colonel Tommaso De Cristoforis left carrying provisions for Boretti; that day it was attacked and destroyed by the troops of Ras Alula near Dogali. Major Boretti, instructed by general Carlo Gené, had no choice but to abandon the fort of Saati, which he did on the evening of January 27, arriving in Moncullo at dawn the following day, without being sighted by the enemy troops. Saati was then permanently occupied by the Italians in March 1887.

== Bibliography ==
- Camillo Antona-Traversi, Sahati and Dogali: 25 and 26 January 1887, Rome, Pallotta Brothers Typography, 1887.
- Bahru Zewde, A History of Modern Ethiopia - from 1855 to 1974, Eastern African Studies, (2nd ed. 1999), London, 1991, page 244
- Haggai Erlich, Ras Alula and the cramble for Africa - A political biography: Ethiopia & Eritrea 1875-1897, First Red Sea Press, Lawrenceville (NJ), Asmara, 1996, 223 p.
- Emilio Faldella, Storia degli eserciti italiani, Bramante editrice, 1976.
- Guy Goddefroid, “L'Italie et l'Éthiopie”, review Vae Victis the themes, Issue no. 4, Winter 2008
- Harold G. Marcus, The Life and Times of Menelik II: Ethiopia 1844-1913, Oxford, Clarendon Press, 1975, page 298
- Raphaël Schneider, “Adoua, 1896”, Champs de Bataille review, issue no. 24, October-November 2008
