= Cammarano =

Cammarano is a surname. Notable people with the surname include:

- Giuseppe Cammarano (1766–1850), Italian painter
- Michele Cammarano (1835–1920), Italian painter
- Peter Cammarano (born 1977), American attorney, politician, and convicted felon
- Salvadore Cammarano (1801–1852), Italian librettist
