= Battle of Gundet =

1875 battle of Ethiopian–Egyptian War

- Part of Ethiopian–Egyptian War
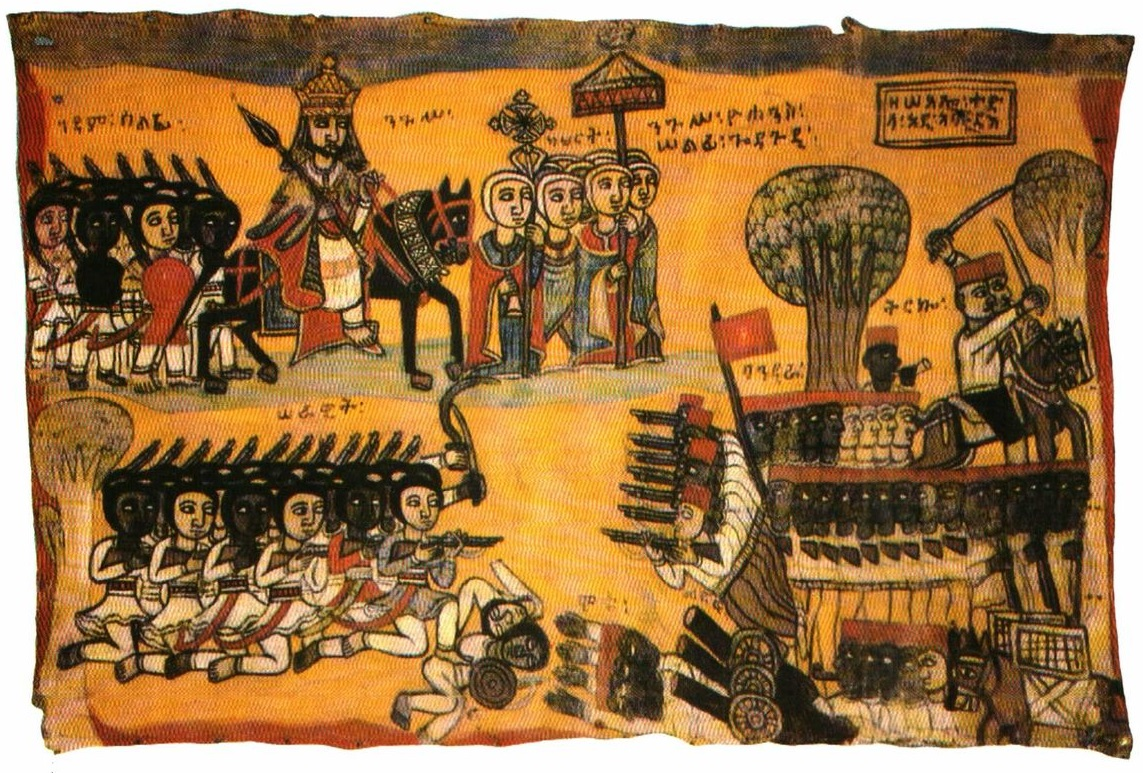
- Ethiopian manuscript illumination of the battle of Gundet (c. 1880)
| Date | 14–16 November 1875 |
| Location | Gundet, Seraye, Mereb Melash |
| Result | Ethiopian victory |

Belligerents
| Ethiopian Empire | Khedivate of Egypt |

Commanders and leaders
| (Ethiopian Empire) Yohannes IV (Ethiopian Empire) Shaleqa Alula | Adolph Arendrup † |

Strength
| 10,000 | 2,500 |

Casualties and losses
| 550 killed 400 wounded | 2,000 killed or taken prisoner 8 artillery pieces captured |

The Battle of Gundet or Guda Gudi was fought from 14-16 November 1875 between the Ethiopian Empire and the Khedivate of Egypt in what is now Eritrea. It was the first major battle of the Ethiopian–Egyptian War and ended in the near annihilation of the Egyptian army.

== The battle ==
The Egyptians under Arakil Bey and Danish Colonel Adolph Ahrendrup invaded from their coastal possessions in Massawa, in what is now Eritrea. Following some skirmishes, the armies of Yohannes and Isma'il met at Gundet on the morning of 14 November 1875. Not only were the Egyptians vastly outnumbered, they were also taken completely by surprise as they were marching through a narrow mountain pass. The mass of Ethiopian warriors sallied forth from their hiding places up the slope and swiftly charged down upon the shocked Egyptian columns, nullifying the latter's advantage in firepower and causing many of the unenthusiastic fellahin soldiers to rout. This encounter ended on the 16th in the complete annihilation and routing of the Egyptian expeditionary force led by Colonel Arrendrup and in the death of its commander.

Arrendrup's expedition was hopelessly inadequate for the tasks he set out to do. It amounted to scarcely more than some 2,500 troops and had no cavalry. Its leaders were, apart from the already mentioned Danish artilleryman and Major Dennison, an American, Major Durholtz, a Swiss, late of the Papal army, and Major Rushdi Bey, a Turk. Arakal Bey, the young nephew of Nubar Pasha (the Christian Armenian Premier of the Khedive) joined the expedition and was killed in battle.

About 2,000 Egyptians perished with him and his two six gun batteries and six rocket-stands fell into the hands of the enemy.

The Egyptians withdrew to Massawa on the coast and then to Keren, garrisoned since 1872 by some 1,200 Egyptians. But Isma'il Pasha could not leave the matter there, it was absolutely essential to regain the lost prestige. At all costs, his European creditors had to be impressed, and he set out on mobilizing a larger force for a second expedition that would make amends for the devastating and humiliating loss he had suffered at the hands of the Ethiopians at Gundet.
