= Battle of Dogali =

1887 battle between Italy and Ethiopia

- Part of the Italo-Ethiopian War of 1887–1889
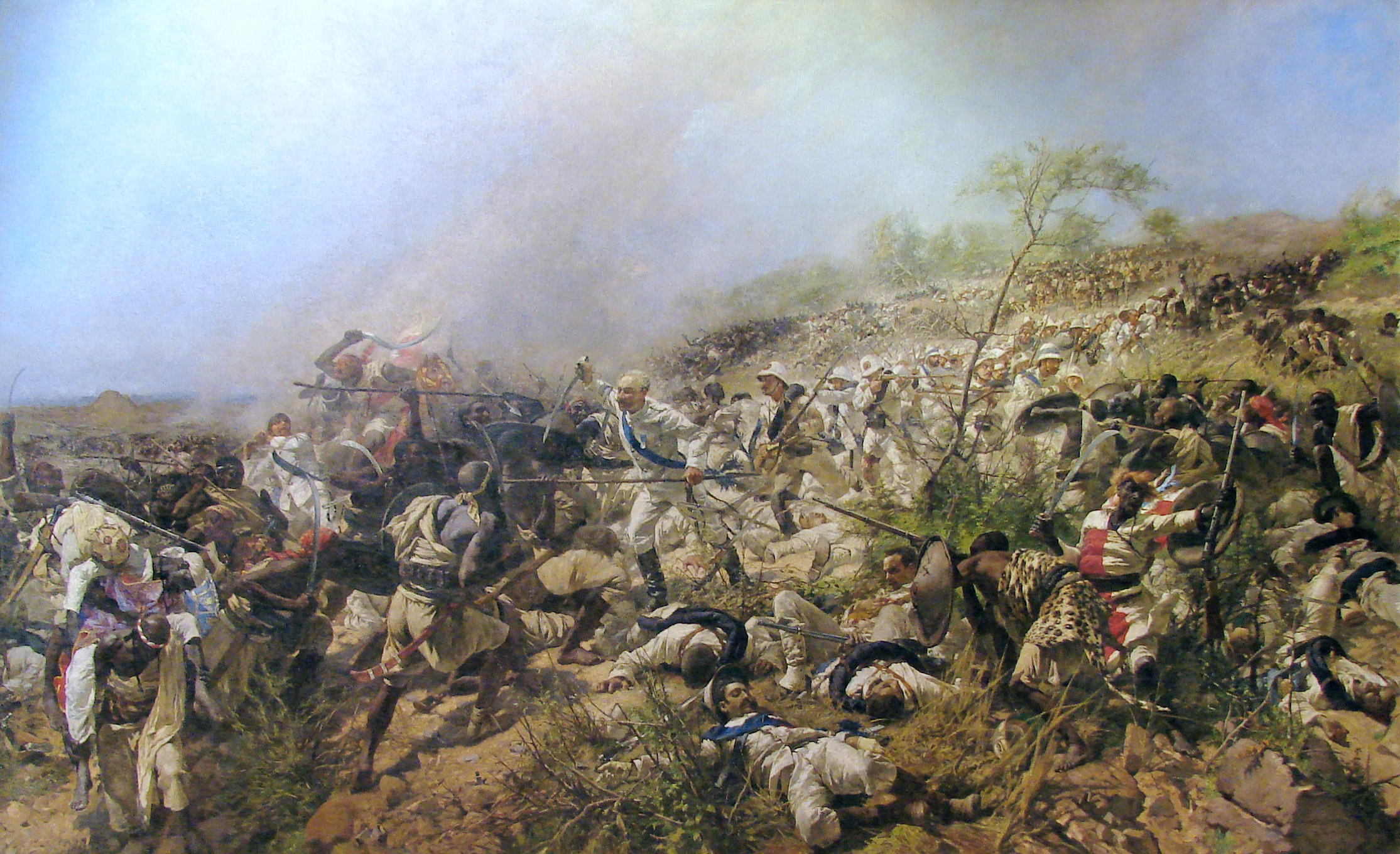
- Battle of Dogali; Michele Cammarano, 1896
Date	26 january 1887; 139 years ago
Location	Dogali, Ethiopian Empire (now in Eritrea)
Result	Ethiopian victory

Belligerents
Italy	Ethiopia

Commanders and leaders
(Kingdom of Italy) Tommaso De Cristoforis †	(Ethiopian Empire) Ras Alula Engida

Strength
~550 infantry	15,000

Casualties and losses
430 killed 80 wounded	730 or 1,071 killed

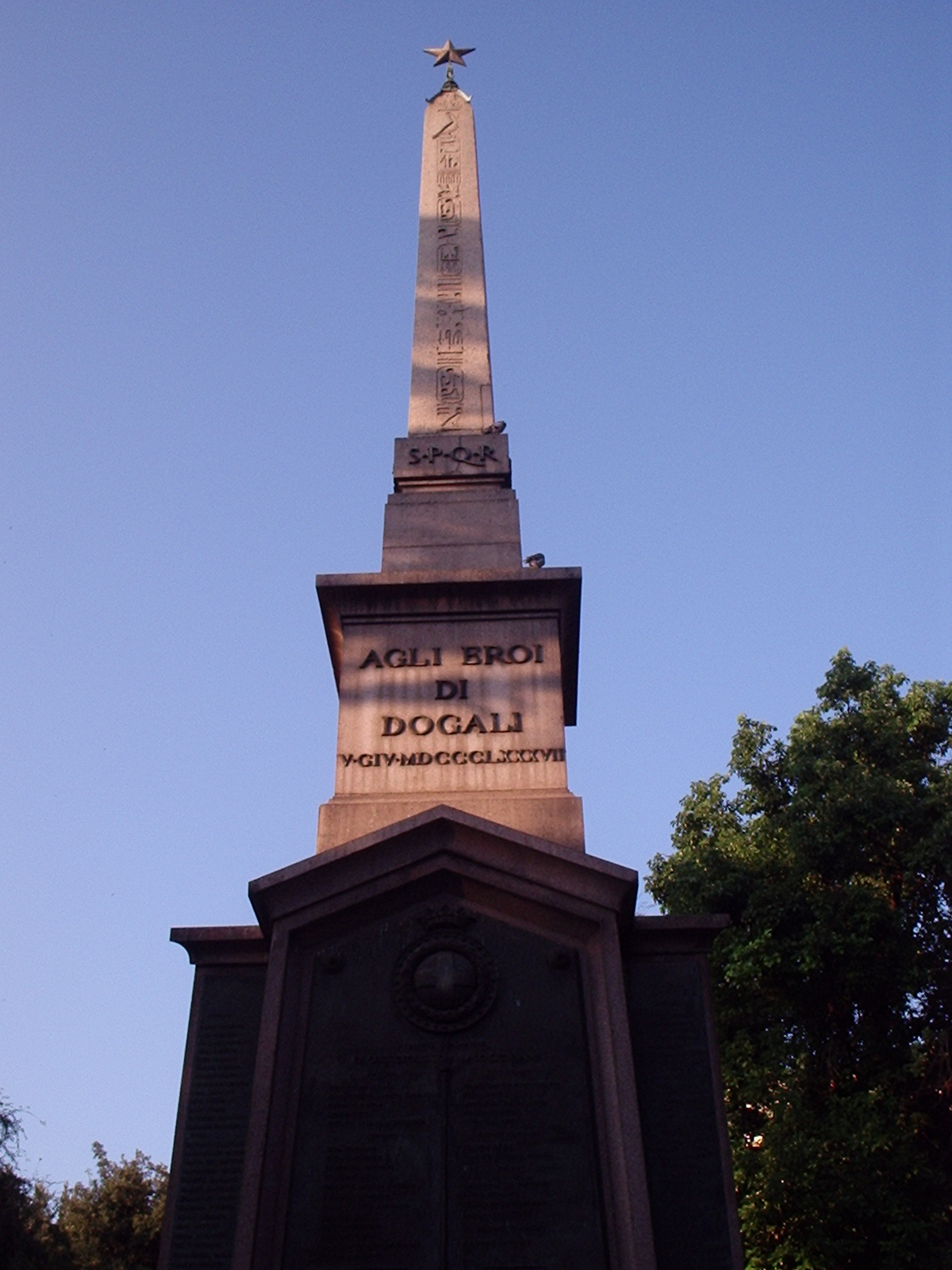
Monument in Rome to the Italian soldiers killed in Dogali

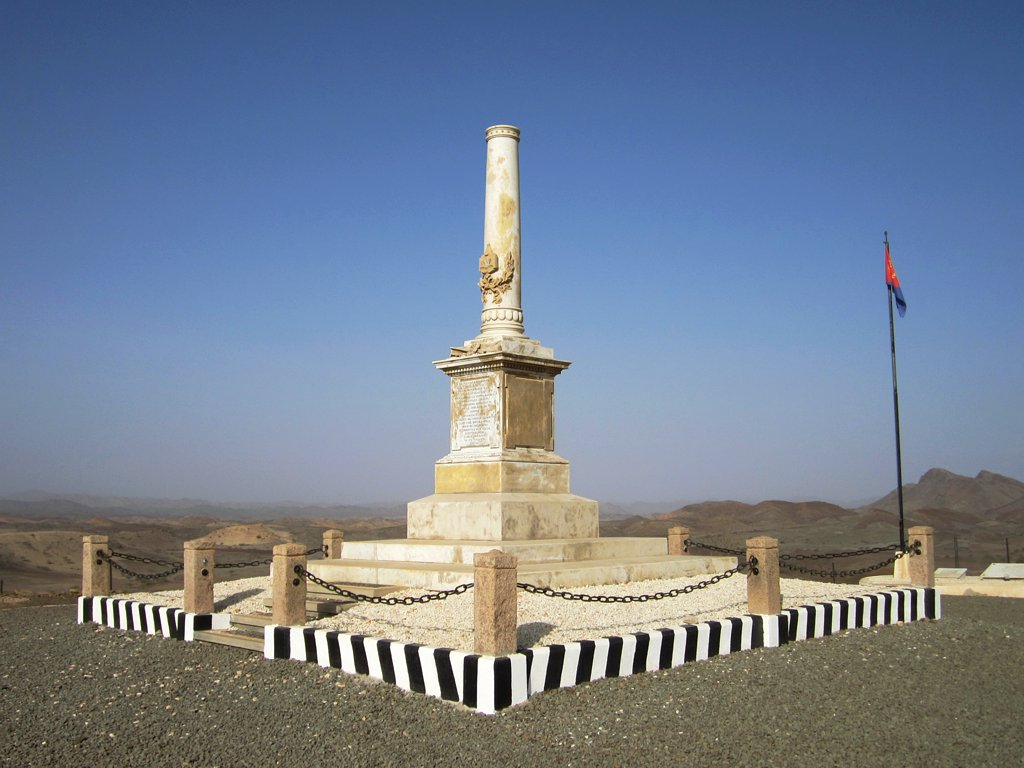
Monument in Dogali

The Battle of Dogali was fought on 26 January 1887 between Italy and Ethiopia in Dogali near Massawa, in Medri Bahri otherwise known as Eritrea.

== History ==
The Italians, after their unification in 1861, wanted to establish a colonial empire to cement their great power status. Their occupation of coastal Eritrea brought Italian interests into direct conflict with those of Ethiopia (Abyssinia).

As soon as the Italians considered they were strong enough to advance into Abyssinia, they seized the villages of Ua-à and Zula along with the town of Sahati, in modern-day Eritrea, and erected a small redoubt on the heights commanding the water supply for the caravans. Ras Alula Engida, the governor under Emperor Yohannes IV, had at the time left Asmara, his headquarters, for the Basen country, in order to punish the Dervishes for raiding the Dembala provinces. On hearing the news of the Italian advance, he returned to Asmara and informed the Italian officials that they were violating the treaty between Abyssinia, Egypt, and Britain, and that any further movement of troops toward Sahati – the fortification of which could only be directed against Abyssinia – would be considered a hostile action and be treated accordingly. The Italians responded by strengthening their redoubt and reinforcing their garrison. By 25 January, the fort at Sahati was held by 167 Italians and 1,000 native troops. On his own initiative, Ras Alula attacked Sahati. Hundreds of his men were slaughtered by cannon and rifle fire, while only four Italians were injured, forcing Ras Alula to pull his men back. After this clash, the Italian garrison requested more ammunition and supplies.

On 26 January, a battalion of roughly 550 men (500 Italians, 50 Eritrean irregulars and two machine guns) under Lieutenant-Colonel Tommaso De Cristoforis, were sent to reinforce the Italian garrison at Sahati, but they were ambushed by a force of approximately 10,000 warriors commanded by Ras Alula; the Gatling guns soon jammed, and after running out of ammunition, Cristoforis and most of his troops were killed in hand-to-hand combat. According to McLachlan, the Italians losses were 23 officers and 407 soldiers killed, while 1 officer and 81 men were wounded, while Vandervolt stated that Cristoforis and his entire command were killed except for 80 wounded soldiers who feigned death and were later rescued; the Italians estimated that 1,000 of Ras Alula's warriors were killed.

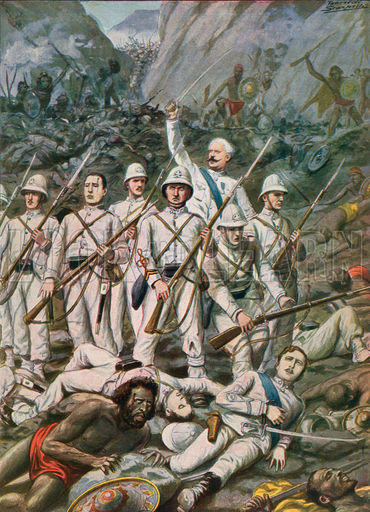
Battle of Dogali, 1887

== Aftermath ==
Following the defeat, the Italians abandoned Sahati and nearby garrisons, but it also sparked a revanchist sentiment in Italy: the newly formed Francesco Crispi cabinet sent 18,000 troops armed with modern weaponry to retake lost ground. While Yohannes IV send a force to oppose this new incursion, his armies were outgunned and the enemy was well entrenched in the highlands. Both armies clashed from March to May 1888, but the Ethiopians—faced with supply shortages and Mahdist incursions on their western border—retreated from the area, allowing the Italians to advance further.

After advancing their way through Asmara—building new fortifications and a railway— the Italians officially established their new Eritrean colony in 1890; although they failed in the occupation of the remaining Ethiopian territory in the First Italo-Ethiopian War. In 1936, Fascist Italy launched a second invasion which resulted in the Italian victory and the occupation of Ethiopia, until it was liberated during WW2.

Although Dogali was only a small victory for the Ethiopians, Haggai Erlich notes that this incident encouraged the Italians to plot with Yohanne's rival Menelik, the ruler of Shewa, to encourage his insubordination towards the Emperor.

== Modern Ethiopian celebrations ==
This battle was celebrated under the Derg regime, and Mengistu Haile Mariam commemorated the centennial with much attention, including the erection of a monument topped with a red star on the battlefield. At the opening ceremony of the centenary commemoration in January 1987, Head of State Mengistu Haile Mariam delivered a speech praising Ras Alula and the Ethiopian soldiers, describing the battle as "a source of pride not only to Ethiopia but to the entire peoples of Africa" and calling it part of Ethiopia's resistance against European colonial powers.

Following Eritrean independence, the monument was removed. Paul B. Henze diplomatically notes in a footnote, "When I crossed the battlefield in 1996, I could detect no trace of the monument."

Erlich provides more information: when Eritrean troops gained control of the area in 1989, "a prominent commander of the Eritrean People's Liberation Front, and a former Minister of Foreign Affairs, Petros Solomon himself was delighted to blast Mengistu's monument of Ras Alula."

This could be attributed to the fact that while Alula was an administrator appointed by Yohannes IV over part of the Eritrean highlands, Observers, including Erlich and others, attribute this to Eritrean Tigrinya views of their own relationship with Ethiopia as a whole.

== Tributes ==
The 4-hectare square in Rome in front of Termini railway station is the Piazza dei Cinquecento, named in honor of the 500 Italian soldiers killed in the Battle of Dogali. Near the square is also a monument to those soldiers.

The Italian cruiser Dogali was named for the engagement.

The Ethiopian government of Mengistu Haile Mariam erected a monument at Dogali to commemorate its 100th anniversary in January 1987. The monument was designed to stress Ethiopia's historical rule in Eritrea amidst the ongoing Eritrean War of Independence. The monument was topped by a red star, a communist symbol of the People's Democratic Republic of Ethiopia. Eritrea won its independence in 1991 and by 1996 the monument had disappeared.

== Notes ==
=== Sources ===
- Erlich, Haggai (1973). A Political Biography of Ras Alula 1875–1897 (PhD). University of London, School of Oriental and African Studies.
- Erlich, Haggai (2024). Rediscovering the Red Sea's Historical Significance (eBook ed.). Singapore: Springer Nature. ISBN 978-981-97-7194-3.
- McLachlan, Sean (2011). Armies of the Adowa Campaign 1896: The Italian Disaster in Ethiopia (PDF e-Book ed.). Oxford, UK: Osprey Publishing. ISBN 978-1-84908-458-1.
- Vandervort, Bruce (2017). "Dogali, Battle of". In Stapleton, Timothy Joseph (ed.). Encyclopedia of African Colonial Conflicts. Vol. 1 (eBook ed.). Santa Barbara, California: ABC-CLIO. ISBN 978-1-59884-837-3.
