= Dogali =

Coordinates: 15°36′06″N 39°18′20″E

Dogali جوندت
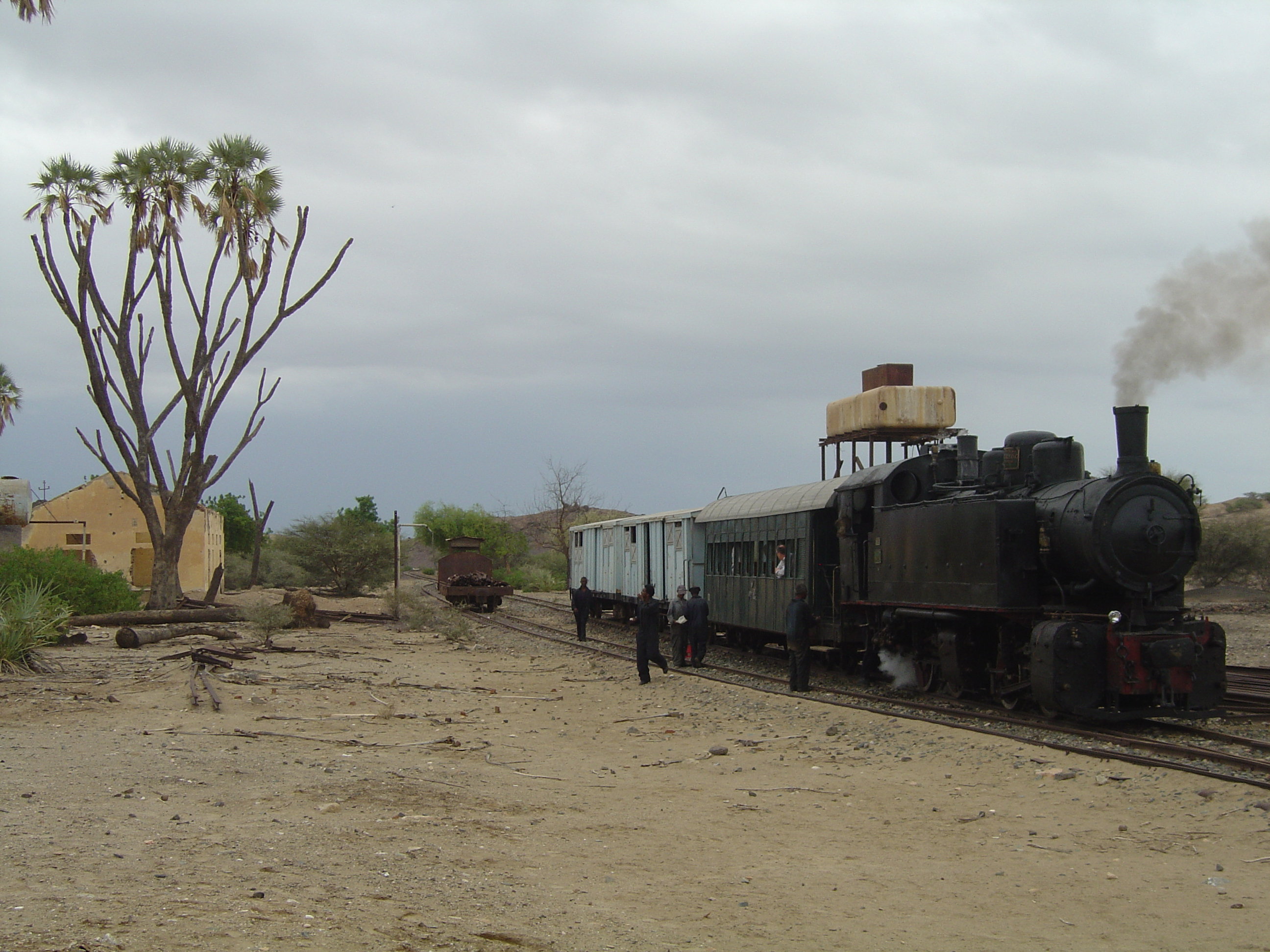
- Dogali railway station
- Interactive map of Dogali
- Country: Eritrea
- Region: Northern Red Sea
- Time zone: UTC+3 (EAT)

Dogali (Arabic: جوندت) is a town in eastern Eritrea. Situated near Massawa, it became famous for the Battle of Dogali, on January 24, 1887, between Italy and the Ethiopian Empire, specifically the lord Ras Alula.

== Transport ==
The town is served by a station on the national railway network, built by the Italians.

== See also ==
- Railway stations in Eritrea
