= Tommaso De Cristoforis =

Italian military officer (1841–1887)

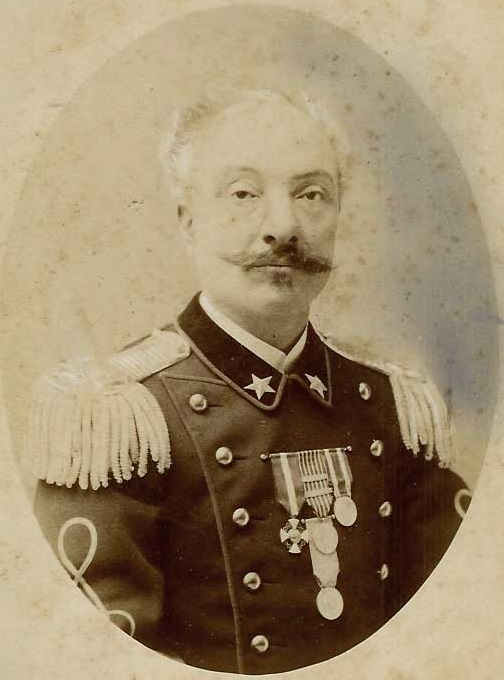
- Born: 6 June 1841; Casale Monferrato, Sardinia-Piedmont
- Died: 26 January 1887 (aged 45); Dogali, Italian Eritrea
- Military career
- Allegiance: Sardinia; Italy
- Branch: Royal Sardinian Army; Royal Italian Army
- Rank: Lieutenant colonel
- Conflicts: Expedition of the Thousand; Siege of Gaeta (1860–1861); Third Italian War of Independence; Italo-Ethiopian War of 1887–1889; Battle of Dogali †
- Awards: Medal of Military Valor

Lieutenant-Colonel Tommaso De Cristoforis (6 June 1841 – 26 January 1887) was an Italian military officer who served in the Sardinian and Italian armies. He participated in the Expedition of the Thousand and Third Italian War of Independence before being sent to East Africa to fight in the Italo-Ethiopian War of 1887–1889. De Cristoforis was killed in action at the Battle of Dogali leading an Italian force against Ethiopian troops.

== Biography ==
He was born in Casale Monferrato on 6 June 1841, son of the lawyer Paolo De Cristoforis who was from a noble Lombard family, and of Antonia Manara, belonging to a family of illustrious Piedmontese jurists. After completing his studies at the high school of his hometown he entered the Royal Military Academy of Turin, from where he left in June 1859, assigned with the rank of second lieutenant to the 12th Infantry Regiment of the "Casale" Brigade. On October 26 of the following year he participated in a battle against the Bourbons at San Giuliano earning the Silver Medal of Military Valor. He participated in the siege of Gaeta as aide-de-camp to General Efisio Cugia. In 1866 he participated in the Third Italian War of Independence as the official Staff General Enrico Cialdini, and subsequently transferred to the Division of Palermo, the stifling of revolt in the city.

Transferred to the 56th Regiment stationed in Turin, his military career took place in the city, reaching the rank of major on 8 November 1880 and, six years later, that of lieutenant colonel in the 93rd Infantry Regiment on May 20. On September 12, 1886, assumed command of III Battalion Infantry d'Africa of the Special Corps of Africa in Massawa, in Italian Eritrea.

=== Battle of Dogali ===
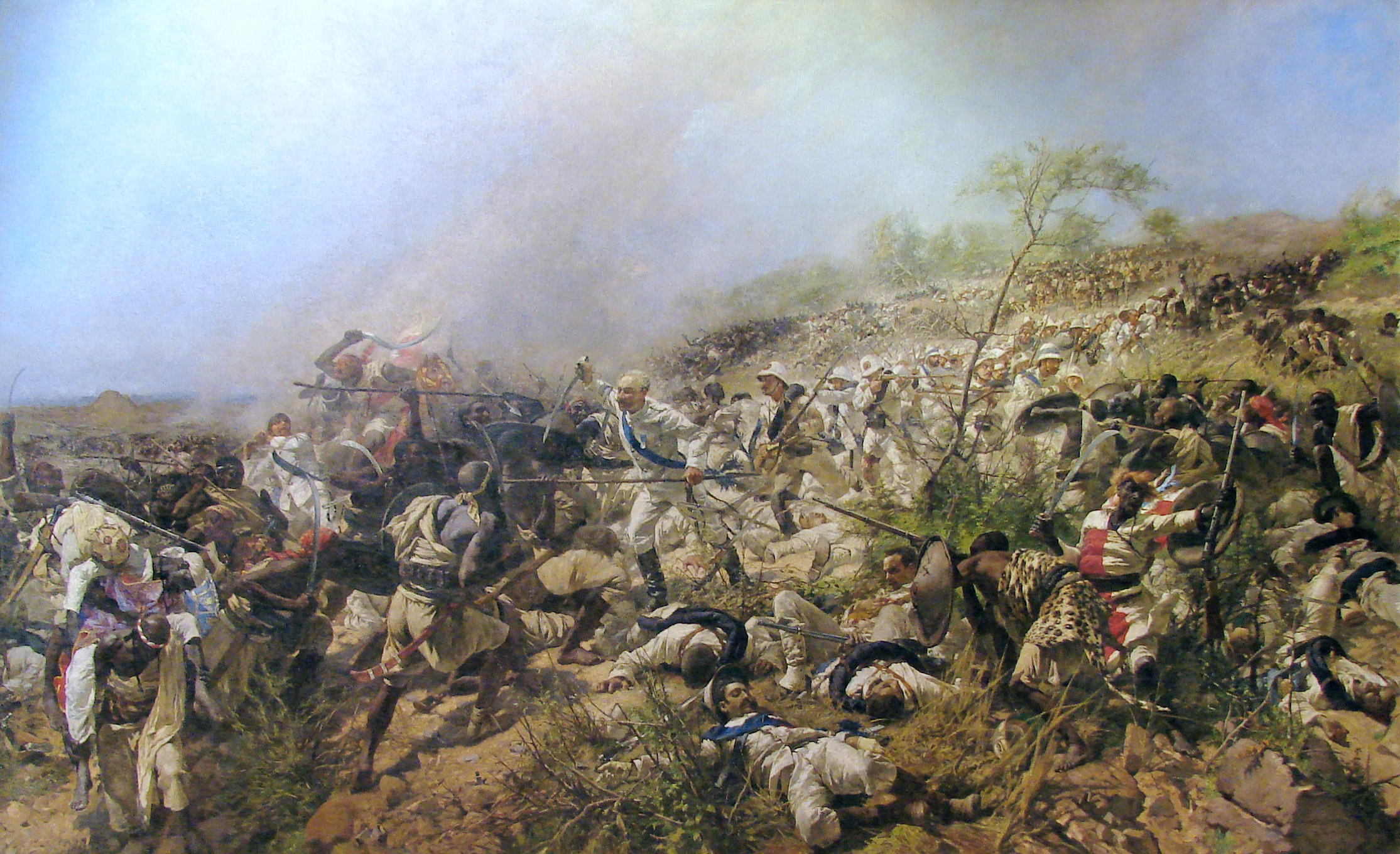
Painting of De Cristoforis (centre, wielding a sword) at the Battle of Dogali

The Italo-Abyssinian relations had gradually become increasingly tense starting from 12 April 1886, when there was the massacre of the exploratory mission led by Count Gian Pietro Porro near Gildessa on the road from Zeila to Harar. Italian troops, then under the command of General Carlo Genè, occupied some positions in November 1886, including Saati, about 30 kilometers from Massawa and then Ua-à. On January 10, 1887, Ras Alula moved with about 10,000 men towards Saati, ordering General Genè to abandon the positions he had just conquered. Genè's response was negative, and he also began to reinforce the Italian positions of Saati and Uaà by sending a reserve column made up of about 700 men, under the command of De Cristoforis. On January 25, the Abyssinians, who had meanwhile left Ghinda, attacked the Italians, commanded by Major Boretti, who successfully resisted, but remained short of ammunition and provisions thus asking for help.

Organized by the Italian command the expedition, De Cristoforis managed to leave from nearby Moncullo at 4 am on January 26, collecting 548 soldiers from different companies and two machine guns. Arriving in the locality of Dogali after a four-hour march, the Italian column was intercepted by the Ethiopians and attacked. De Cristoforis, although seriously outnumbered, did not refuse the clash; he arranged the men on two hills joined by a slight depression, in a semicircle formation about 500 meters long, and accepted the fight. During the very hard and long battle, he sent two relay races to Moncullo, the first on foot and the second on horseback, to ask for support.

Due to the heavy losses Ras Alula ordered his men to try to circumvent the Italian positions, and the maneuver caused De Cristoforis to try to fall back in an orderly manner to Moncullo. The Abyssinians managed to circumvent the Italian positions, which, with the machine guns jammed and ammunition practically exhausted, were reduced to fighting with melee weapons. When the outcome was evident De Cristoforis ordered the survivors to present their weapons in honor of the fallen, being killed shortly after in the course of a sword fight by opposing spears. The rescue column, led by Captain Tarturro, arrived in the late afternoon and quickly collected the wounded survivors, returning to Moncullo. The ascertained Italian losses were of 23 officers and 423 soldiers and fallen "Basci bazuk", while Abyssinian losses were over a thousand dead and numerous wounded.

== Awards ==
- Gold Medal of Military Valor

For having spontaneously engaged in combat against disproportionately superior forces and for having subsequently made a heroic defense in which he was killed and all his employees were killed or wounded. Dogali Africa, January 26, 1887 .

— Royal Italian Decree February 24, 1887

- Silver Medal of Valor

For the intrepidity and courage he showed in the Battle of San Giuliano.

— Royal Italian October 26, 1859

- Order of the Crown of Italy
- Commemorative Medal of the Unity of Italy
