= Ras Alula =

Ethiopian general and politician (1847–1897)

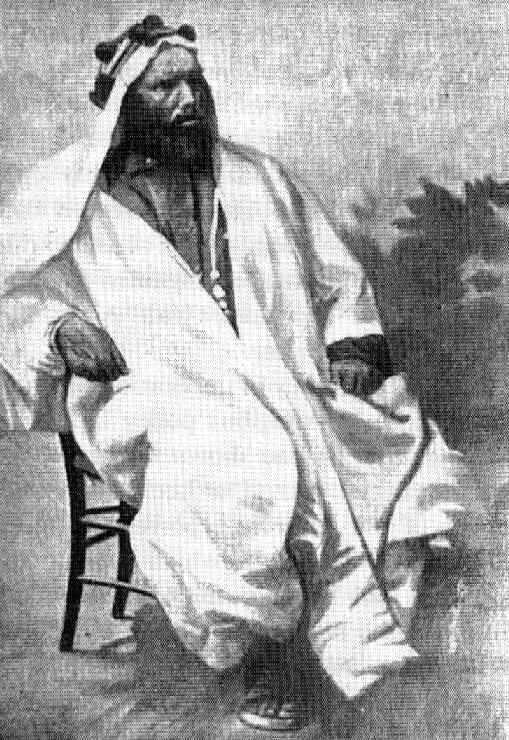
- Born: 1847; Mennewe, Tembien, Ethiopian Empire
- Died: 15 February 1897 (aged 49–50); Tembien, Ethiopian Empire
- Spouse: W. Bitawa Gabra Masqal
- Children: Dammaqach; Dinqnash; Sahaywarada
- Military career
- Allegiance: Yohannes IV; Menelik II
- Service years: 19th century
- Conflicts: Egyptian–Ethiopian War; Battle of Gundet; Battle of Gura; Mahdist War; Battle of Kufit; Battle of Gallabat; Italo-Ethiopian War of 1887–1889; Siege of Saati; Battle of Dogali; First Italo-Ethiopian War; Battle of Amba Alagi (1895); Battle of Mekelle (1896); Battle of Adwa

Ras Alula Engida (Ge'ez: ራስ አሉላ እንግዳ) (c. 1847 – 15 February 1897; also known by his horse name Abba Nega and by Alula Equbi) was an Ethiopian general and politician who successfully led battles against Ottoman Egypt, the Mahdists and Italy. He was one of the most important leaders of the Abyssinian forces during the 19th century. Described by Haggai Erlich as the "greatest leader whom Ethiopia produced since the death of Emperor Tewodros II in 1868.".

== Early years ==
Alula was born around 1847 in Mennewe, a small village in Tembien, the son of Engda Eqube, a farmer of modest origins. Haggai Erlich relates a story about Alula's childhood – "well known throughout Tigray": a group of people carrying baskets of bread to a wedding ceremony were stopped by a group of children led by the future Ras, who demanded to know where they were going. "To the Castle of Ras Alula Wadi Equbi," they mockingly replied. "Thereafter," concludes Erlich, "his friends and the people of Mannawe nicknamed him Ras Alula."

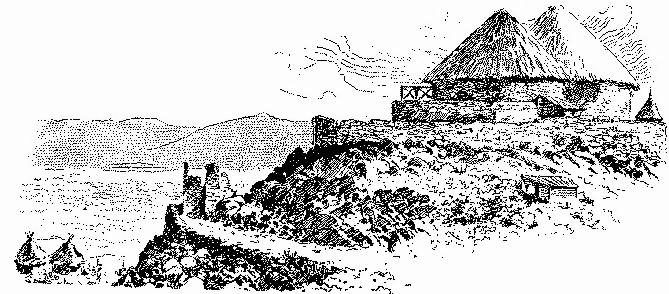
The house of Ras Alula at Asmara, in present-day Eritrea

At first Alula attached himself to the distinguished Ras Araya Dimtsu, hereditary chief of Enderta who was lord of the land his father farmed; before long he gained the attention of Ras Araya's successful nephew, Dejazmach Kassa Mercha (the future emperor Yohannes IV), who made him his elfegn kalkay ("chamberlain and doorkeeper"). Erlich records an oral tradition that the young Alula distinguished himself by being the one who captured king Tekle Giyorgis in the Battle of Assem where Emperor Yohannes crushed his opponent (11 July 1871). In spite of his humble background, Alula succeeded in climbing the ladder of the feudal hierarchy.

Alula demonstrated his military skill in the Battle of Gundet and Gura, which were fought in November 1875 and March 1876 respectively, where he routed the Egyptian forces. Having masterminded these victories he was promoted to Ras and was also given the additional title of turk bašša, the functionary in charge of firearms and commander of the imperial elite corps. Emperor Yohannes badly needed a man with these skills at the moment, for Ras Woldemichael Solomon was in revolt in Hamasien; Alula was sent to deal with this unruly aristocrat, who fled to Bogos. On 9 October 1876, the Emperor made Alula governor of Mereb Mellash (today part of Eritrea).

== Military career ==
During 1877–78, Alula established firm Ethiopian imperial control across the Eritrean highlands, terminating the local autonomy of leading families in Seraye, Akele Guzai and especially Hamasien. He centralised the province's economy and developed its commerce, including with the help of local Muslim traders. In 1884 he moved his headquarters to the small village of Asmara, establishing it as his capital.

In the Hewett Treaty, concluded in June 1884, Alula was actively involved in the formulation of the agreement, which was intended to end Egyptian presence in the region in exchange for Ethiopian assistance evacuating Egyptian garrisons isolated by the Mahdists at Amedeb, Algeden, Keren, Ghirra, and Gallabat. However the treaty also facilitated the Italian capture of Massawa in February 1885, which Alula and Emperor Yohannes IV had not anticipated.

Ras Alula prepared for his campaign against the Mahdists, despite the opposition of certain local leaders who did not accept his rule. Nevertheless, Alula advanced into the territory of the Bogos, then entered Keren in September 1885, where he stayed for ten days, then marched on Kufit.

At Kufit, Osman Digna's forces were annihilated, but the Ethiopians also suffered significant losses: the commanders Blatta Gebru and Aselafi Hagos were killed, and Ras Alula himself was wounded.

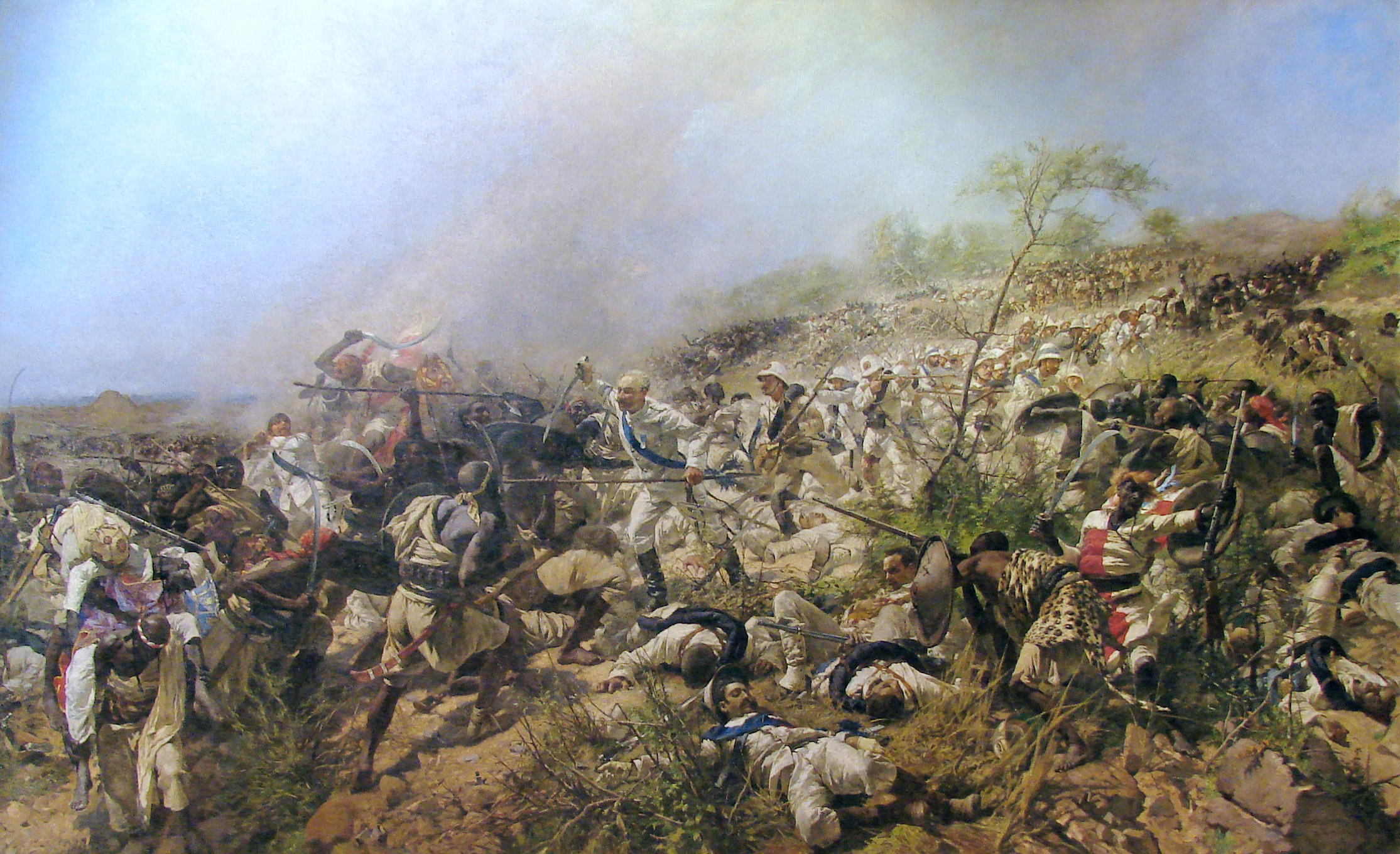
Battle of Dogali in 1887

However events beyond the Horn of Africa gave Ras Alula very little time to recover from the battle. As part of the European Scramble for Africa, the Italians had taken control of the Red Sea coasts, occupying Massawa and Saati with the tacit approval of the British, which was a violation of the Hewett Treaty.

Although he had collaborated with the British against the Mahdists, Ras Alula's chief interest was to guarantee Ethiopian sovereignty, which made him very wary towards the English whom he suspected of supporting the Italians' encroachments. His mistrust is clearly expressed in a conversation carried out with Augustus B. Wylde, the former British vice consul at Jeddah, who recorded these words in a dispatch to the Manchester Guardian:

What does England mean by destroying Hewett's treaty and allowing the Italians to take my country from me? …Did I not relieve the Egyptian garrison in the Bogos country? Did I not fight at Cassala when it was too late? Have I not done everything I could? You English used us to do what you wanted and then left us.

Upon returning to Asmara, Alula mobilized 5,000 men and marched from Ghinda towards Saati. It is unclear whether Ras Alula was acting on his own initiative in this instance, or at the orders of his Emperor. Discussing the battle later, he insisted that he was following orders; contemporary Ethiopian documents support Ras Alula's claim. However, in a 9 March 1887 letter to Queen Victoria, Emperor Yohannes wrote that his general had first spent two weeks investigating the Italian presence, then demanded that the Italians either evacuate their positions outside of Massawa or fight.

Before attacking the Italians, he notified Emperor Yohannes of his intentions, expressing to Harrison, who had accompanied the admiral Hewett during the negotiations of the treaty, that the British had not honored their word. The first clash with the Italians took place on 25 January 1887 at Saati, where the Ethiopians were repulsed with heavy casualties. Alula rallied his troops and the following day ambushed and annihilated an Italian relief column at Dogali, killing the commander Colonel Tommaso De Cristoforis along with 400 soldiers and 22 officers. These victories sealed his reputation as an invincible general.

A key factor in the eventual fall of Mereb Mellash was internal betrayal. Chief of Alula's Tigrayan rivals was his brother-in-law, Fitawrari Däbbäb Arýaya, who had long resented Yohannes favouring a man of peasant origins over the established noble families. Däbbäb became a šéfta (outlaw) operating in the area between Massawa and Asmara, collaborating first with the Egyptians and later with the Italians. In February 1888, after the Italians sent a strong army to avenge Dogali and entrenched themselves on the Eritrean coast, Däbbäb persuaded Yohannes that the Italian aggression was the result of Alula's over-ambition. Unable to face the entrenched Italians, Yohannes forced Alula to leave Asmara and accompany him to face the Mahdists. With Mereb Melash thus exposed, Däbbäb entered Asmara in February 1889 and killed Alula's deputy, Dejazmach Hayla Sellase. The Italians subsequently entered Asmara without firing a single shot and proceeded uninterrupted to the Mareb river, proclaiming their Colonia Eritrea on 1 January 1890.

By 1888 the Italians and Mahdist dervishes were ready to renew their attacks. In March 1889, the Battle of Gallabat (also known as the Battle of Metemma) was fought on the western Ethiopian border. The forces of the Mahdi were nearly obliterated, however Emperor Yohannes was wounded and died the following day. After Yohannes's death, Alula captured Däbbäb, who had attempted to seize Adwa, and had him killed in September 1891.

Emperor Yohannes' death led to a period of political turmoil in Ethiopia. Although Yohannes, on his deathbed, had named his son Ras Mengesha as his heir, within a matter of weeks Menelik II declared himself emperor and was recognized throughout Ethiopia. For the next five years Alula tried to maintain Tigray's independence, at one stage in December 1891 going as far as concluding a short-lived treaty with the Italian occupiers of Eritrea directed against Shewan domination. However, Tigrayan inter-rivalries and the nobility's persistent resistance to his leadership continued to weaken the province. In June 1894 Alula finally accompanied Ras Mengesha, Ras Hagos Tafari and the now released Ras Woldemichael Solomon to Addis Abeba to submit to Menelik, a reconciliation that paved the way for the Adwa victory.

Meanwhile, Ras Alula found himself isolated, his patron dead, and the steady Italian advance from the coast having deprived him of his power base beyond the Mareb River.

Menelik II of Shewa was crowned emperor only a few months after the battle. The Italian Count Pietro Antonelli, who represented his country in Ethiopia, hastened to Wuchale where he negotiated a treaty with Menelik, which gave official Ethiopian recognition to Italian possession of all of the land the Italians occupied. A few months later, they used this treaty to declare Eritrea their African colony.

Following the Treaty of Wuchale, the Italians continued to extend to the west not only around Teseney and Agordat, but also around Adwa. Unknown to Emperor Menelik, the Italian version of the treaty had language making Ethiopia a protectorate of Italy, and the Italian actions were in preparation for its enforcement on his empire. When Emperor Menelik learned of this treachery, he renounced the treaty which led to the First Italo-Abyssinian War, and the major nobility and military figures, including Ras Alula, unanimously joined him. The conflict culminated at the Battle of Adwa on 1 March 1896.

In this battle, Alula was on the left side of the Ethiopian positions, on the heights of Adi Abune, supported by soldiers of Ras Makonnen, and Ras Mikael. The forces of Ras Sebhat of Agame and Dejazmach Hagos Tafari likewise joined Ras Alula and Ras Mengesha.

Augustus Wylde, a contemporary of the events, described Ras Alula's invaluable contribution to this critical battle:

The Abyssinians never expected to be attacked, and the Italian advance would have been a complete surprise, had it not been for Ras Aloula, who never believed the Italian officials, and would never trust them. Two of his spies observed the Italians leave Entiscio, and arrived by a circuitous route, and informed Ras Aloula, who was one mile to the north of Adi-Aboona, that the enemy was on the march to Adowa. The Ras immediately informed King Menelik and the other leaders, and the Abyssinians prepared for battle, sending out strong scouting parties in all directions in front of their positions towards Entiscio.

Ras Alula was assigned to watch the Gasgorie Pass and block the arrival of Italian reinforcements coming from Adi Quala. According to Haggai Erlich, Ras Alula had only a small force, and probably played a limited part in the actual fighting.

== Personal life ==
He had three children by his first wife Woizero B'tweta. However, in order to enhance his position at the Imperial court, he divorced his wife and married Woizero Amlesu Araya, daughter of Ras Araya Dimtsu, the powerful and much respected uncle of Emperor Yohannes IV. His second marriage was purely for political reasons, to improve his legitimacy with the local aristocracy, who did not hide their disapproval at seeing the son of a peasant reach this stature. According to British diplomat Sir Gerald Herbert Portal, Alula was illiterate, being unable to read or write.

== Death ==
Appointed by Menelik over the northern part of Tigray after Adwa, Alula's rivalry with the province's leading nobles intensified. In January 1897 he collided with Ras Hagos of Tembien at the battle of ʿAddi Óumay and killed him, but suffered a gunshot wound to the leg and died of gangrene on 15 February 1897.

== Legacy ==
[Ras Alula is] the best general and strategist that Africa has perhaps produced in modern times.

— Augustus Wylde, The Manchester Guardian, 1901, p. 20

Ras Alula holds a special place in Ethiopian history as one of the greatest military figures the country has ever produced. His role was largely marginalized by Shewan historiography during the reign of Haile Selassie, but his legacy was revived following the 1974 Revolution and the escalation of the Eritrean war. The Mengistu government erected a monument at Dogali and promoted the image of Alula as an Ethiopian defender of Eritrean soil. The Eritrean People's Liberation Front, however, cast him as an Ethiopian occupier and jailer of Eritrea's leading figures, notably Ras Woldemichael Solomon; when they captured the Dogali area in 1988 they destroyed the monument. The Tigray People's Liberation Front by contrast cherished his legacy, naming the elite unit that entered Addis Abeba in May 1991 and heralded the establishment of a new Ethiopian government the "Ras Alula Division."

The airport in Mek'ele is named after Ras Alula, and an equestrian statue is dedicated to him in that city. A hotel in Axum also bears his name. Ethiopian scholar Richard Pankhurst named his son, Dr. Alula Pankhurst, after Ras Alula.
