= Michele Cammarano =

Italian painter

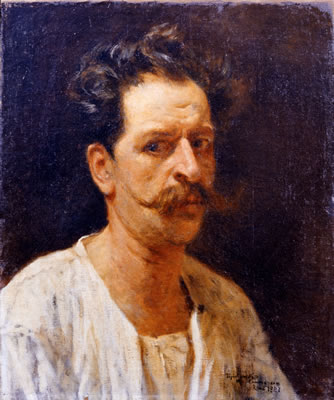
Self-portrait (1887)

Michele Cammarano (23 February 1835, Naples - 15 September 1920, Naples) was an Italian painter who was best known for his battle scenes, although he worked with a wide variety of subjects.

== Biography ==
His grandfather was Giuseppe Cammarano, a painter and occasional actor, and his father was Salvadore Cammarano, a famous opera librettist who wrote for Giuseppe Verdi. He enrolled at the Accademia di Belle Arti di Napoli in 1853. Later, he studied with Gabriele Smargiassi, Giuseppe Mancinelli and the Palizzi brothers (Filippo and Giuseppe), painters in the Naturalistic style. He had his first exhibition in 1855 at the "Real Museo Borbonico".

In 1860, however, he became fascinated with Giuseppe Garibaldi and enlisted in the "Guardia Nazionale" to help eliminate the brigantaggio; a major step in the reunification of Italy. His experiences had a decisive influence on his artistic career. A brief stay in Florence after his service brought him into contact with the Macchiaioli, who also had some influence. In 1863, one of his paintings was purchased by King Victor Emmanuel II.

In 1865, he moved to Rome, then, in 1867, to Venice. In 1870, his admiration for Gustave Courbet led him to Paris. He was determined to meet Courbet, which he did and, while he was there, discovered the works of Théodore Géricault.

In 1888, he was commissioned by the Italian government to create a monumental canvas depicting the Battle of Dogali (1887). After reading about the geography and local customs, he moved to Massawa to inspect the battle site in person and remained for almost five years to complete the painting. While there, he also created landscapes and portraits of the local people.

In 1900, he was appointed to succeed his old teacher, Filippo Palizzi, as Professor at the Institute in Naples. After that, his productivity declined, although he made a few trips to Sicily to paint landscapes. A street in Naples has been named after him.

== Selected paintings ==
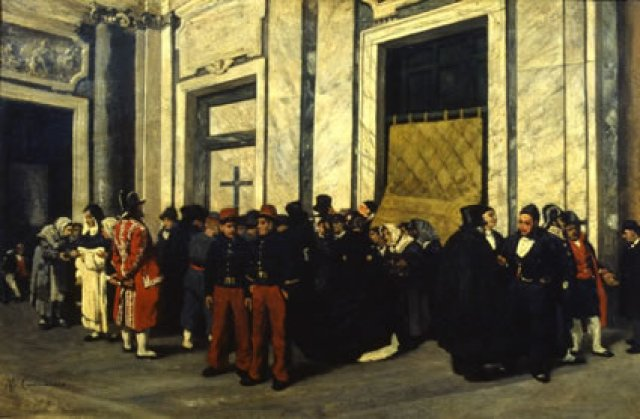
The Atrium of Santa Maria Maggiore (1865/66)

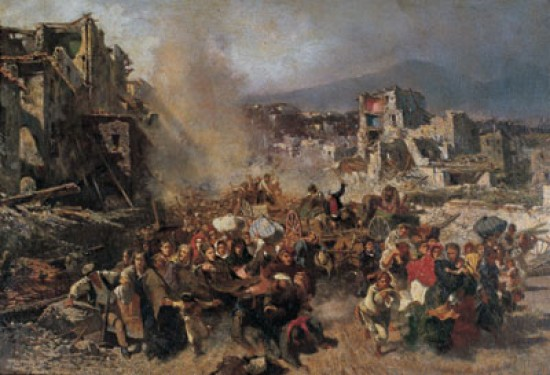
The Effects of an Earthquake (date unknown)

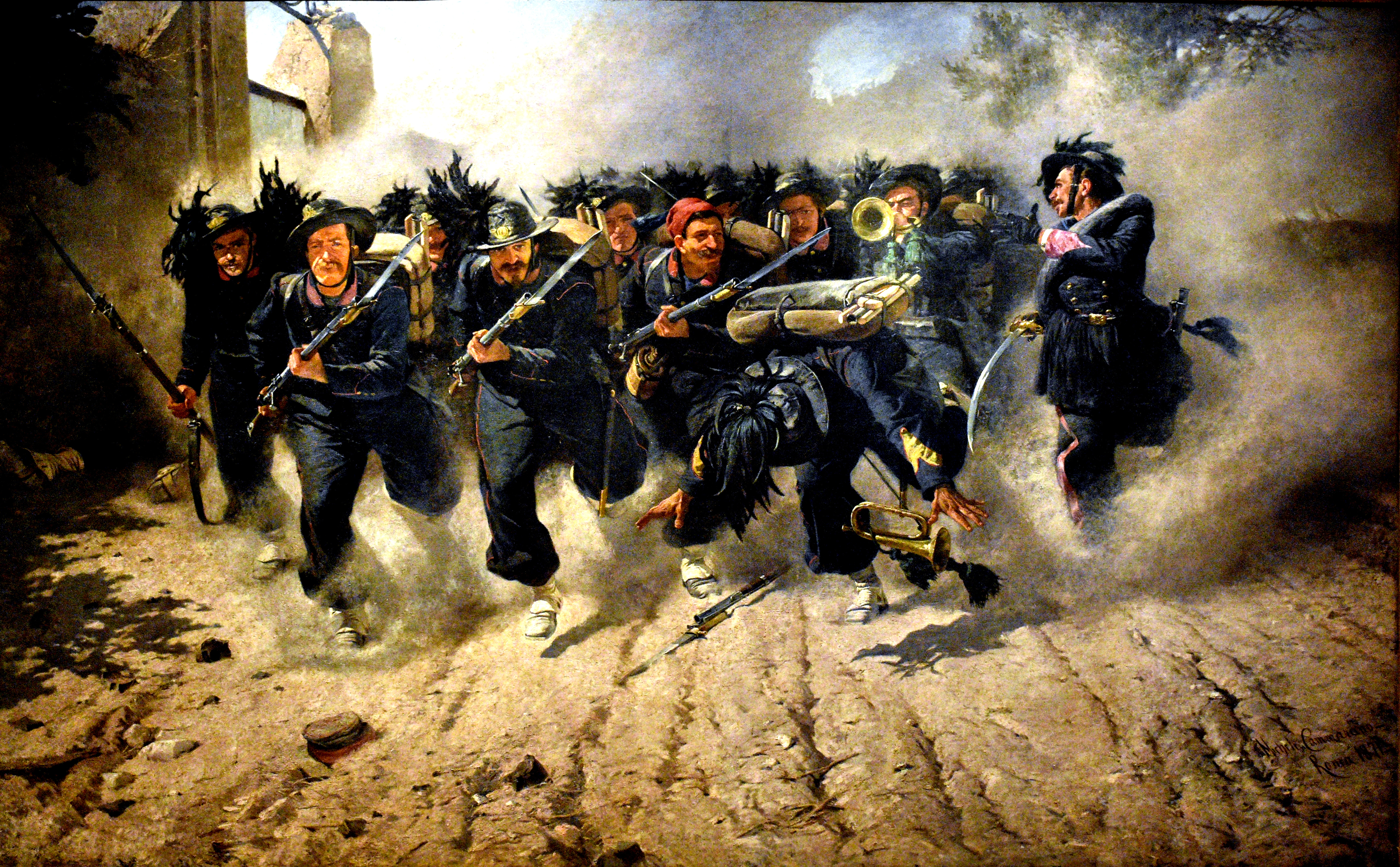
The Infantry at Porta Pia (1871),
Museo di Capodimonte

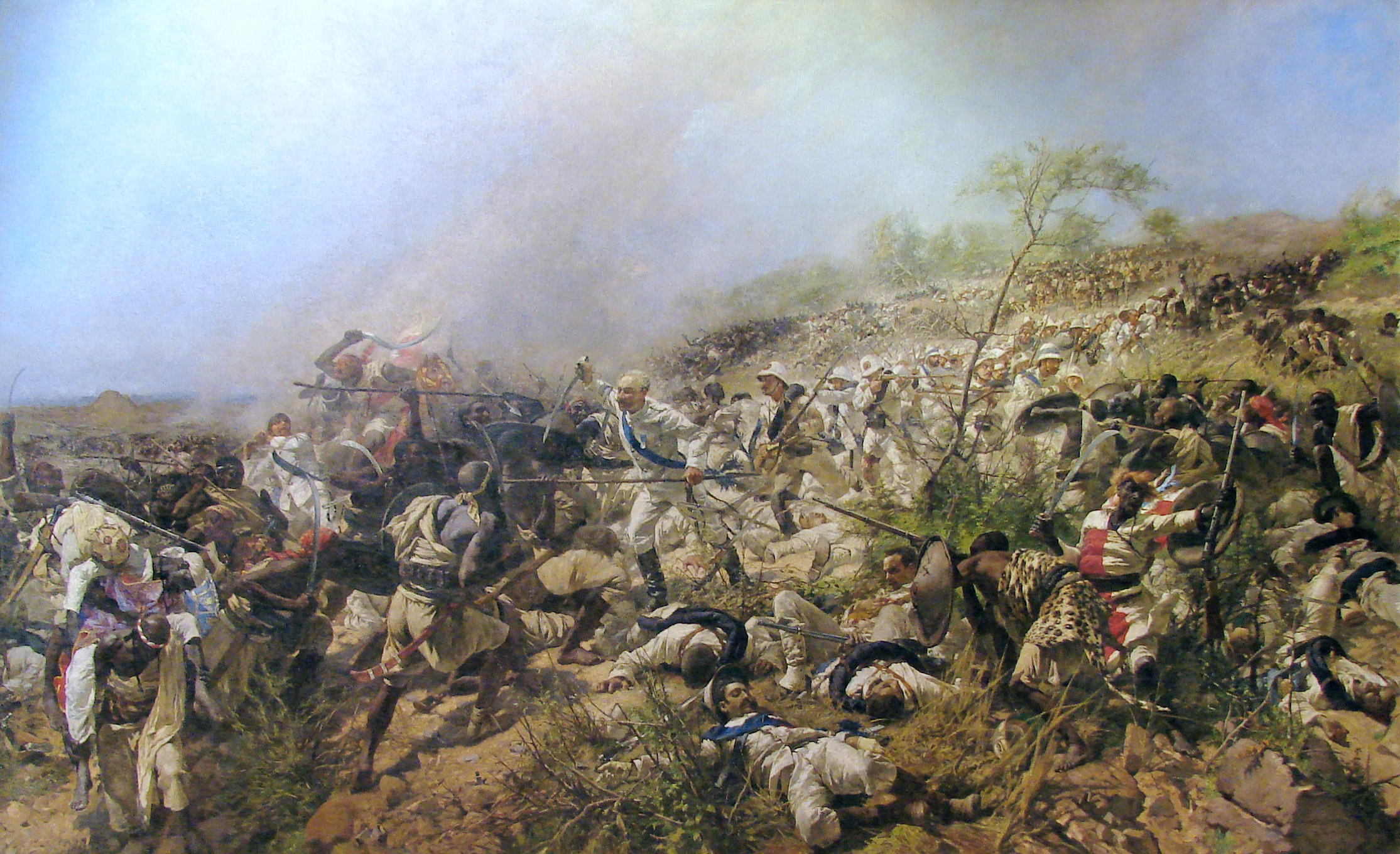
The Battle of Dogali (1896)

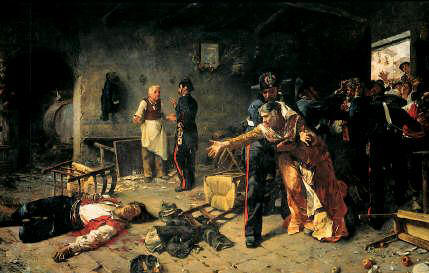
Game of Trumps (1886)
