= Haggai Erlich =

Israeli professor (born 1942)

- חגי ארליך
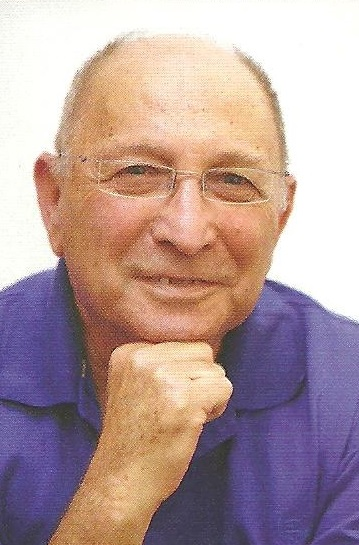
- Haggai Erlich in 2007
- Born: March 29, 1942 (age 84); Tel Aviv
- Occupation: Professor of Middle Eastern History

Haggai Erlich (Hebrew: חגי ארליך; born 1942) is professor emeritus at Tel Aviv University and an academic adviser at the Open University of Israel where he is the head of Middle Eastern History studies. He is the Landau Prize recipient for 2010 in African Studies.

== Early life and education ==
Haggai Erlich was born to a working-class family in Tel Aviv, was a member of the leftist youth movement Hashomer Hatsair and studied in the Oriental Class of Tel Aviv municipality secondary school D. He served in the Nahal paratroops battalion and as a reservist fought in the battle on Jerusalem in 1967 Six-Day War. He composed some of the paratroops' popular songs, some of which are still in circulation. Between 1959 and 1969 he was one of Israel leading high-jumpers and represented the country in international athletic meetings.

In 1989 in the World Masters Games in Denmark, he came second in the 45 – 50 category, clearing 1.65m. In the 1960s he played basketball in Israel's premier league and in 1997 won the academic staff tennis championship.

Erlich completed his B.A. studies in Tel Aviv University in General History and History of the Middle East and Africa, and his M.A. studies in the Hebrew University under the guidance of Professor Gabriel Baer (cum laude, 1969). His thesis was on the tribes of Yemen and their role in the civil war. In 1973 he received his Ph.D. from the School of Oriental and African Studies, University of London, where he wrote his thesis on the History of Ras Alula, Ethiopia's national hero, under the guidance of professors Richard Gray and Edward Ullendorff.

Erlich taught in Tel Aviv University from 1973 till his retirement in 2004. He served there as head of graduate studies in the Middle Eastern History Department, School of History. He was a visiting professor at Concordia, Montreal, 1978–1979, Georgetown University, 1985–1986 and 1992–1992, and in San Diego State University, 1999-2000. He is an associate editor of Northeast African Studies, Michigan, a member of the International Committee of Ethiopian Studies, the "field expert" on Islam and the Middle East in Encyclopaedia Aethiopica, Hamburg, and the head of the editorial board of the journal of Israel's Association of Islamic and Middle Eastern Studies (MEISA), Hamizrah Hehadash. From 1983 he has headed the development of Middle Eastern studies in the Open University of Israel.

In 2004 Erlich retired as emeritus from Tel Aviv University and intensified his involvement in the Open University. The program he developed from 1983, based on ten volumes of introduction he wrote himself, was recognized in 2007 by the Higher Education Council of Israel as a BA program in "the Middle East and its Cultures". It combines the study of the history of Arab-Islamic societies with those of other societies in the region. Erlich heads a committee at the Open University, tasked with facilitating studies for Arab students; in this context, he is also in charge of translating ten of the courses in various fields into Arabic. In the Open University he also developed Ethiopian studies and for the purpose wrote three introductory books in Hebrew.

== Studies ==
Erlich studies focus on Ethiopia, on the modern Middle East, and on the connections and the relations between these histories. His studies on Ethiopia deal mainly with the internal ethnic dynamism between Tigreans and Amhara and the country's political culture as a factor in Ethiopia's survival in facing European imperialism. His studies on the Middle East deal mainly with the development of higher education and the role of students in politics. His studies on the relations between Ethiopia and the Middle East – a field he is pioneering — reconstruct the history of major strategic meeting points and focus mainly on the conceptual Islamic-Christian dimensions and the religious historical legacies which inspired and continue to influence those relations.

=== Ethiopia and Eritrea, Ras Alula, 1875–1897 ===
A biography of Ethiopia's national hero, Ras Alula, the general and statesman who played a central role in Ethiopia's struggle for survival in facing late 19th century imperialism. In this context the book analyzes Ethiopia's relations with Egypt, the Mahdist Sudan, the Italians, and the British during the Scramble for Africa, and attempts at explaining Ethiopia's victories. In the same context it analyzes Ethiopia's home affairs of the time, mainly Tigrean-Shoan relations, the establishment of Asmara and late 19th century Eritrean history.

=== The Struggle Over Eritrea, 1962–1978 ===
Analysis of the birth of the Eritrean nationalist movement and fight for independence. It focuses mainly on the internal struggles of the Eritreans as they were interwoven with two simultaneous developments: the internal affairs of Ethiopia during the time of Haile Sellassie and the beginning of Mangistu's period; and the relevant developments in the Arab world and the Arab-Israeli conflict of the time.

=== Ethiopia and The Challenge of Independence ===
A collection of twelve articles which had been published in various journals, all revolving around the Ethiopian modern experience, and which in sequence constitute an attempt at understanding the country's unique success at maintaining independence.

=== Students and University in Twentieth Century Egyptian Politics ===
This book follows two dimensions in the history of Egypt's modernization. One is the development and the evolution of the University as both a national concept and an educational institution. It reconstructs the role of politicians in shaping higher education from the 1908 establishment of the Egyptian University to Anwar Sadat’s revolutionary expansion of the education system. The other dimension is the role of students in politics. The book analyses the influence of the higher education system on the creation of the students as an active sociopolitical class; it surveys the students’ role in major historic junctures, and describes the pivotal role of the educated youth in the making of the country's modern politics.

=== Introduction to Modern History of the Middle East ===
A five volume history of the Middle East from 18th century developments in the Ottoman Empire to World War I, and the establishment of the modern states of the Middle East. The narrative follows stages of modernization culminating with the emergence of modern nationalists ideas and movements, and is accompanied by hundreds of short informative articles and hundreds of authentic illustrations.

=== Ethiopia and the Middle East ===
A discussion of the relations between Ethiopia and the Oriental Middle East from medieval times to the present. It follows two interwoven aspects. One is the reconstruction of major junctures of political connections and strategic collisions. The second is the analysis and evolution of the basic mutual concepts and images which were shaped in earlier formative stages and have been reshaped in later confrontations to be transmitted to the conceptual reservoir of today's Ethiopian, Egyptian and Arab nationalism.

=== The Middle East Between the World Wars ===
Five volumes surveying the history of the Middle East from the aftermath of World War I to the end of World War II. The series analyses the "Parliamentarian" 1920s and "The Crisis of the 1930s" focusing mainly on the dynamism of inter-generational tensions as a key to sociopolitical and ideological changes. In so doing the series surveys developments in each of the major countries, but also attempts to narrate the history of the region as the home of a common Islamic-Arab civilization. Volume 5 (The Middle East During World War II, 2003) analyzes the same inter-generational tensions in Arab societies during the war, the anti-British activities on the one hand and the final victory (as of 1942) on the other hand of the elite groups leading to the emergence of the rather conservative Arab League (1945).

=== Ethiopia: an Empire and a Revolution ===
A history of Ethiopia from the early medieval Aksumite dynasty to the 1990s as analyzed mainly along the competition between centralizing concepts and institutions (“the Amahara thesis”) on the one hand, and the pluralistic, de-centralist concepts of culture and politics (“the Tigrean thesis”) on the other hand. The narrative also attempts to explain the ability of this Christian dominated society to retain, over that long history, its political sovereignty in facing both imperial Islam and Western imperialism.

=== Youth and Politics in the Middle East – Generations and Identity Crises ===
A discussion of modern Middle Eastern history as developing around the role of higher education (and its various architects) in shaping new “political generations” in Arab societies, and the role of such “political generations” - mainly those of 1906, 1919, 1935, and the 1970s — in offering and struggling for renewed interpretations of both politics and identity.

=== The Nile – Histories, Cultures, Myths ===
This book was edited by Erlich with Israel Gershoni. It is a collection of 18 articles contributed by some of the world's leading scholars of Egypt, Sudan and Ethiopia, of Islam and of Eastern Christianity. These articles were originally presented in a 1997 international conference held in Tel Aviv University and in Jerusalem under the same title. The introduction, written with co-editor (and co-organizer) Professor Israel Gershoni, presents the main theme of the book: the role of the River Nile in communicating, but also separating between its various riparian cultures and societies. The various chapters discuss the main Nile countries’ common world of inter-relations, mutual images and myths, their image in medieval and modern Europe, and the various historical backgrounds to today's crisis of the Nile's waters.

=== The Cross and the River – Ethiopia, Egypt and the Nile ===
A history of sixteen centuries of relations is analyzed, revolving around dimensions of mutual dependence: Ethiopia being the main source of Egypt's Nile, and Egypt being the main source of Ethiopia's Christianity. The complexities of good neighborliness and conflicts, of suspicions, myths and wars, of religious and cultural interpretations of the “self” and the “other”, is discussed from the 4th century creation of Ethiopia as a bishopric of the Egyptian Church to today's Egyptian and Ethiopian anxieties over the future of the Nile waters.

=== Ethiopia – Christianity, Islam, Judaism ===
This book was written by Erlich with Steven Kaplan and Hagar Salamon. It is a detailed history of Ethiopia's religious history, and a discussion of the Ethiopian interpretation of each of its three belief systems, their local institutions, and their inter-relations. An introduction (by H. Erlich, the general editor) summarizes the flexible, non-essentialist nature of Ethiopia's religiosity. “Christianity” (by Professor Steven Kaplan) analyzes the history and many faces of the country's hegemonic religion. “Islam” (H. Erlich) discusses its role among ethnic minorities and on the margins of society, and ends with its apparent revolution and penetration into the core as of the 1990s. “Judaism” (by Hagar Salamon) surveys “Beta Israel’s" culture against the historical Ethiopian context.

=== Egypt – The Older Sister ===
The first volume of the Open University's new series The Middle East in Our Time. The series’ twelve volumes, authored by leading Israeli scholars (with H. Erlich as chief editor) will cover the history of the region's various states from 1945 to the 1980s, (each volume concluding with a succinct analysis to 2000). The Older Sister’s introduction surveys Egypt's leading role in shaping modern developments in the Middle East and in influencing the all-regional periodization of the post World War II era. The book’s three parts are devoted to a detailed analysis of “The End of the Parliamentarian Era, 1945–1952”, “Nasser and Nasserism, 1952–1970”, and “Sadat – The Return to Egyptianism, 1970 - 1981”. The pivotal theme is the ever-dynamic interplay between the various social and political forces in Egypt and the country's various identities – Islamic, Arab, Egyptian.

=== Saudi Arabia and Ethiopia – Christianity, Islam and Politics Entwined ===
A history of modern relations between the Wahhabi-Islamic state and Ethiopia, beginning in the 1930s and culminating in today's radicalization of Islam in the region and Ethiopia's transformation from a “Christian island” into a multicultural state. The narrative follows the development of strategic relations ever since Mussolini's conquest of Ethiopia through the Ogaden War and local activities of the terrorism networks of the 1990s. The conceptual dilemmas of Ethiopia's Christian establishments, of Ethiopia's Muslim communities and of the Saudis are analyzed as they have developed along and influenced these processes.

=== Ethiopia – History of a Siege Culture ===
An analytical survey of Ethiopia's history from early Aksumite period to today's developments. The first part of the book discusses the medieval foundations of the country's political culture; the second part focuses on the late 19th century victory of Ethiopia over both European imperialists and local neighbors; and the third part explains the price paid for these formative victories – the entrenchment of traditional structures and concepts as shapers of Ethiopia to 1974. The fourth part analyzes the communist revolution under Mengistu Haile Mariam (to 1991) as a recycling of the medieval siege culture in a new cloak, and argues that today's opening to both the outside world as well as to internal diversity and free economy is the first authentic revolution in the country's history.

=== Islam and Christianity in the Horn of Africa, Somalia, Ethiopia, Sudan ===
Tracing the modern history of the region where the two religions first met, and where they are engaged now in active confrontation, this book surveys the political developments in the Horn of Africa since the late nineteenth century. The analysis combines the factual changes with an exploration of the ways in which religious formulations of the nearby "other" influenced policymaking and were also reshaped by it. It demonstrates how initial Islamic and Christian concepts remain directly relevant in the region today.

=== Generations of Rage – University and Students in the Middle East ===
A detailed analysis of the development of higher education in the region combined with discussion of the rule of students in changing the Middle East along eight major historical junctures, from the rise of modern nationalist movements to the Arab Spring.

=== Alliance and Alienation – Ethiopia and Israel in the Days of Haile Selassie ===
A discussion of the special relations between what used to be a Christian empire and the Jewish state of Israel. Analyzing the legacies of old religious messages and their influence on modern strategic relations the book, based on new archival material, sheds new lights on an African-Middle Eastern drama which began with great promise and ended disastrously in 1973.

== Publications ==
- Haggai Erlich, Ethiopia and Eritrea, Ras Alula, 1875–1897, Michigan State University Press, 1982. (Reprint under the title Ras Alula and the scramble for Africa. A political biography: Ethiopia and Eritrea 1875–1897, new preface, Red Sea Press, New Jersey and Asmara, 223 pp., 1996).
- Haggai Erlich, The Struggle Over Eritrea, 1962–1978, Hoover Institution, Stanford, 1983.
- Haggai Erlich, Ethiopia and The Challenge of Independence, Lynne Rienner Press, Boulder 1986.
- Haggai Erlich, Students and University in Twentieth Century Egyptian Politics, Frank Cass Publishers, London 1989.
- Haggai Erlich, Introduction to Modern History of the Middle East, The Open University Press, Tel Aviv, 1987–1991. (Hebrew)
- Haggai Erlich, Ethiopia and the Middle East, Lynne Rienner Press, Boulder, 1994.
- Haggai Erlich, The Middle East Between the World Wars, The Open University Press, Tel Aviv, 1992–2003. (Hebrew).
- Haggai Erlich, Ethiopia: an Empire and a Revolution, The Open University Press, Tel Aviv 1997 (Hebrew).
- Haggai Erlich, Youth and Politics in the Middle East – Generations and Identity Crises, Tel Aviv 1998 (Hebrew)
- Haggai Erlich and Israel Gershoni (eds.) The Nile – Histories, Cultures, Myths, Lynne Rienner Publishers, Boulder 2000.
- Haggai Erlich, The Cross and the River: Ethiopia, Egypt and the Nile, Lynne Rienner Publishers, Boulder 2002.
- Haggai Erlich, Steven Kaplan and Hagar Salamon, Ethiopia – Christianity, Islam, Judaism, The Open University Press, Tel Aviv, 2003 (Hebrew)
- Haggai Erlich, Egypt – The Older Sister, The Open University Press, Tel Aviv (Hebrew, 2003, 343 pp.)
- Haggai Erlich, Saudi Arabia and Ethiopia – Christianity, Islam and Politics Entwined, Lynne Rienner Publishers, January 2007
- Haggai Erlich, Ethiopia – History of a Siege Culture, Broadcast University, Ministry of Defence, Tel Aviv, 2008 (Hebrew, 295 pp.)
- Haggai Erlich, Islam and Christianity in the Horn of Africa, Somalia, Ethiopia, Sudan, Lynne Rienner Publishers, 2010, 225 pp.
- Haggai Erlich, Generations of Rage – University and Students in the Middle East, The Open University Press, 2012, (Hebrew. English version entitled: Youth and Revolution in the Changing Middle East, 1916 – 2014 is to be published by Lynne Rienner Publishers, forthcoming).
- Haggai Erlich, Alliance and Alienation – Ethiopia and Israel in the Days of Haile Selassie, Tel Aviv, Dayan Center, 2013 (Hebrew. English version, Red Sea Press, New Jersey, 2014).
- Haggai Erlich, From Aswan to the Renaissance, Egypt, Ethiopia and the Nile, Tel Aviv, Dayan Center, 2016 (Hebrew).
- Haggai Erlich, The Middle East – The Greatest Crisis Since Muhammad, Yediot Sfarim, Tel Aviv, 2017 (Hebrew).
