= Gherardo Pantano =

Italian military officer (1868–1937)

Gherardo Pantano (1868 – 17 August 1937) was an Italian military officer and writer. He spent decades in Italy's African colonies and also fought on the Italian front during World War I.

== Life ==
Pantano was born in Oderzo in 1868. He studied at the Military Academy of Modena before being sent to Eritrea in September 1894. During the First Italo-Ethiopian War, he commanded the VIII Battaglione indigeni of the Royal Corps of Eritrean Colonial Troops (ascari) as a sub-lieutenant. He fought in the battles of Coatit, Senafe, Debra Ailà, Mai Merèt and Adwa, being captured in the last. In 1898, he explored the Danakil Depression. He lived in Merca from 1905 to 1907 and was posted to Somaliland again in 1909–1910. In 1913, during the Italo-Turkish War, he led a battalion of ascari in Libya. After the war, he served as commissioner of Jebel Akhdar and Yafran. When the tribes rebelled against Italian rule, he counselled a withdrawal to the coast. In a memorandum to the Colonial Ministry dated 29 July 1915, he blamed Italian failure on hostility towards Arabs and the use of reprisals.

After Libya, Pantano returned to Eritrea. During the First World War, he was promoted to lieutenant-general and given command of an infantry division. He took part in the battles of Monte Cucco and Bainsizza in 1917. After the war, he was sent to Libya in command of the XIV Brigata "Chieti". In 1921, with Armando Maugini, he was sent on a mission to the territory of the Niassa Company in Portuguese Mozambique. In 1926, he was promoted to the rank of army corps general. He died in Montecatini Terme on 17 August 1937. His widow, Eugenia Dal Bo, donated his papers to the Archivio della Guerra in the Palazzo Moriggia in Milan.

== Works ==
Pantano wrote or co-wrote several books. Nel Benadir: la città di Merca e la regione Bimal (Leghorn, 1910) is an important work of ethnography covering the city of Merca and the Bimaal people, including their oral traditions. It is one of the only accounts of pre-colonial Bimaal society. Relazione sulla missione al Nyassa portoghese (Rome, 1927), co-written with Maugini, is an account of their Niassa mission. La battaglia di Adua e il generale Baratieri (Bologna, 1933) and Ancora della Battaglia di Adua (undated) are two accounts of the battle of Adwa. Ventitré anni di vita africana (Florence, 1932) is a memoir of all his years in Africa.

In addition, Pantano edited a volume of Giulio Douhet's writings, Le profezie di Cassandra: raccolta di scritti del generale Giulio Douhet (Genoa, 1931). In some places, he abridged the text to bring Douhet more in line with the reigning ideology of the National Fascist Party.

== Bibliography ==
- "Archivio di storia contemporanea» (già «Archivio della guerra»): inventario dei fondi organici – persone". Archivio delle Civiche Raccolte Storiche del Comune di Milano – Museo del Risorgimento nazionale. 2017.
- Bigi, Ferdinando (1977). "Il prof. Armando Maugini: un maestro indimenticabile". Africa: Rivista trimestrale di studi e documentazione dell'Istituto italiano per l'Africa e l'Oriente. 32 (1): 117–134. JSTOR 40758734.
- Cassanelli, Lee V. (1982). The Shaping of Somali Society: Reconstructing the History of a Pastoral People, 1600–1900. University of Pennsylvania Press.
- Hippler, Thomas (2013). Bombing the People: Giulio Douhet and the Foundations of Air-Power Strategy, 1884–1939. Cambridge University Press.
- Stephenson, Charles (2014). A Box of Sand: The Italo-Ottoman War, 1911–1912. Tattered Flag Press. ISBN 978-0-9576892-2-0.
- Vento, Andrea (2010). In silenzio gioite e soffrite: storia dei servizi segreti italiani dal Risorgimento all Guerra fredda. Il Saggiatore.
- Zaghi, Carlo (1938). "Pantano, Gherardo, generale". Enciclopedia Italiana. Vol. Appendice I. Istituto dell'Enciclopedia Italiana.
