= Battle of Debra Ailà =

1895 battle of the First Italo-Ethiopian War

- Part of First Italo-Ethiopian War
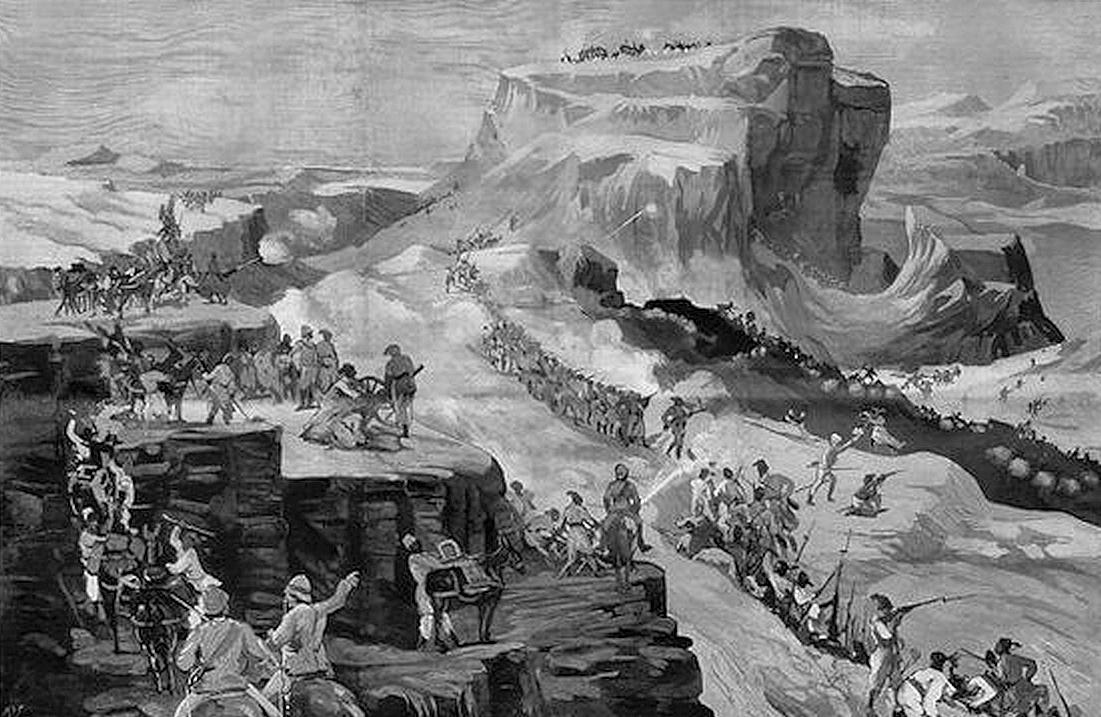
- Depiction of the battle in L'Illustrazione Italiana
Date	9 October 1895
Location	Debra Ailà, Tigray, Abyssinia
Result	Italian victory

Belligerents
Italy: Italian Eritrea	Ethiopia: Tigray

Commanders and leaders
Giuseppe Arimondi; Giovanni Ameglio	Mengesha Yohannes; Ras Alula

Strength
1 Italian battalion 1 Askari battalion	1,300 men

Casualties and losses
11 dead Askari, about 30 wounded	20 dead, several wounded, some prisoners

The Battle of Debra Ailà (Debre Ailat) took place during the First Italo-Ethiopian War on 9 October 1895, when under the combined efforts of Italian colonial troops and Askari troops defeated the rearguard of the Tigrayan army, which had withdrawn from Tigray's capital Mek'ele.

== Starting positions ==
Ras Mengesha Yohannes, the Ethiopian governor of Tigray, created a plan to forestall a potential Italian invasion by launching a pre-emptive attack on Italian Eritrea had failed in the battles of Coatit and Senafe in January 1895. In a counter-attack, Italian troops had occupied Adua, Adigrat and Tigray's capital Mek'ele before they had to interrupt their advance with the onset of the rainy season in April 1895 and establish themselves in Mek'ele. In the meantime, Ras Mengesha had set up a new army of 12,000 men together with Ras Alula Engida and initially camped a few kilometers south of the city in Antalò (Hentalo). At the end of the rainy season in September 1895, the Italians received new reinforcements and began their advance again. Their goal was no longer a punitive expedition, but the complete and permanent occupation and submission of Tigray.

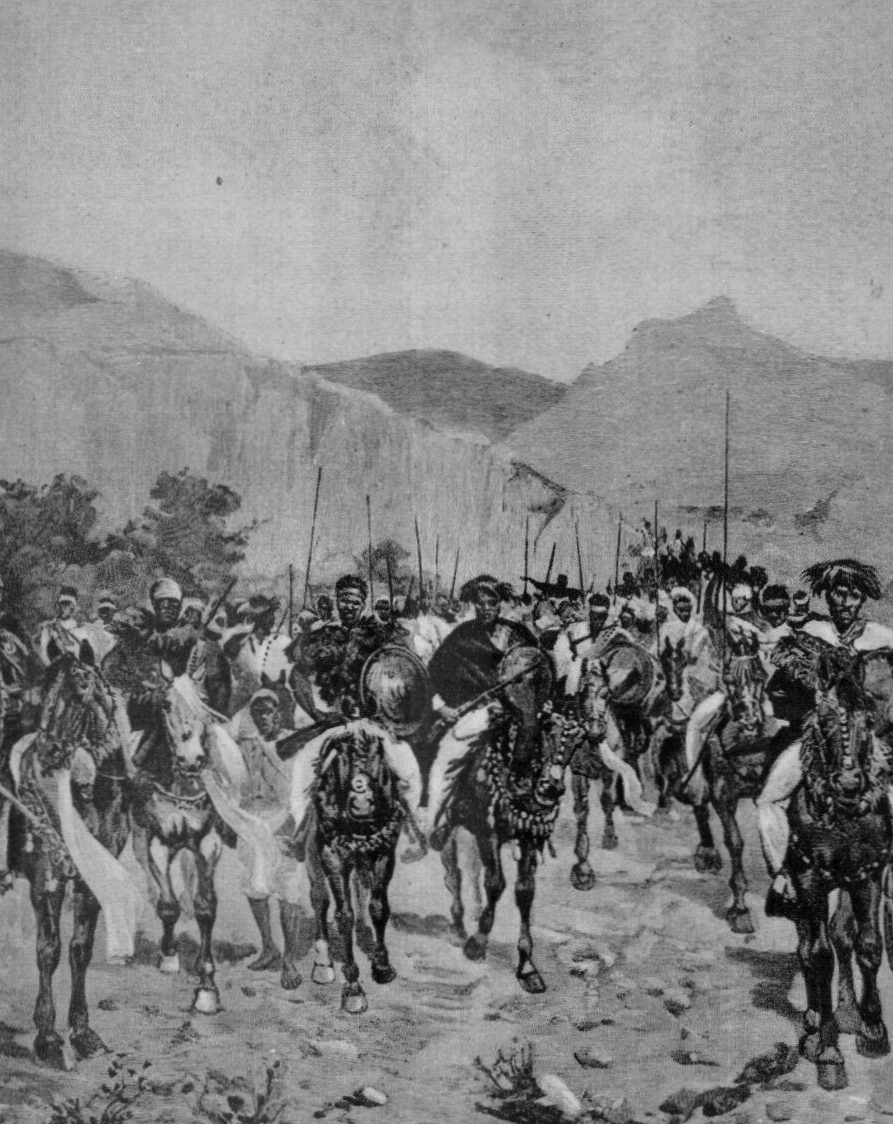
Ras Mengesha (left) on the march back (L'Illustrazione Italiana)

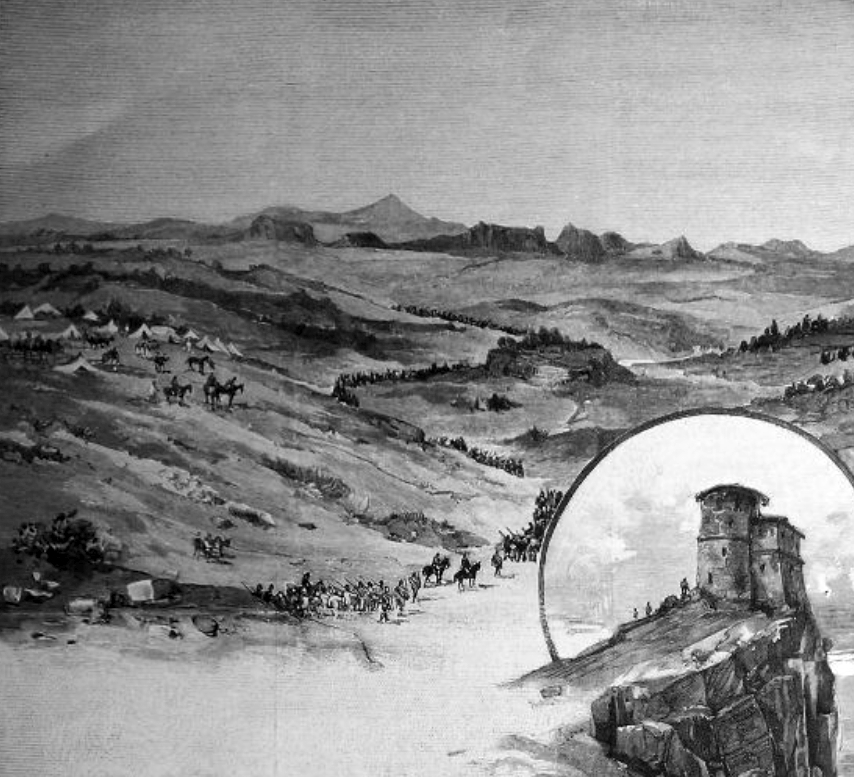
Italian advance on Mek'ele (L'Illustrazione Italiana)

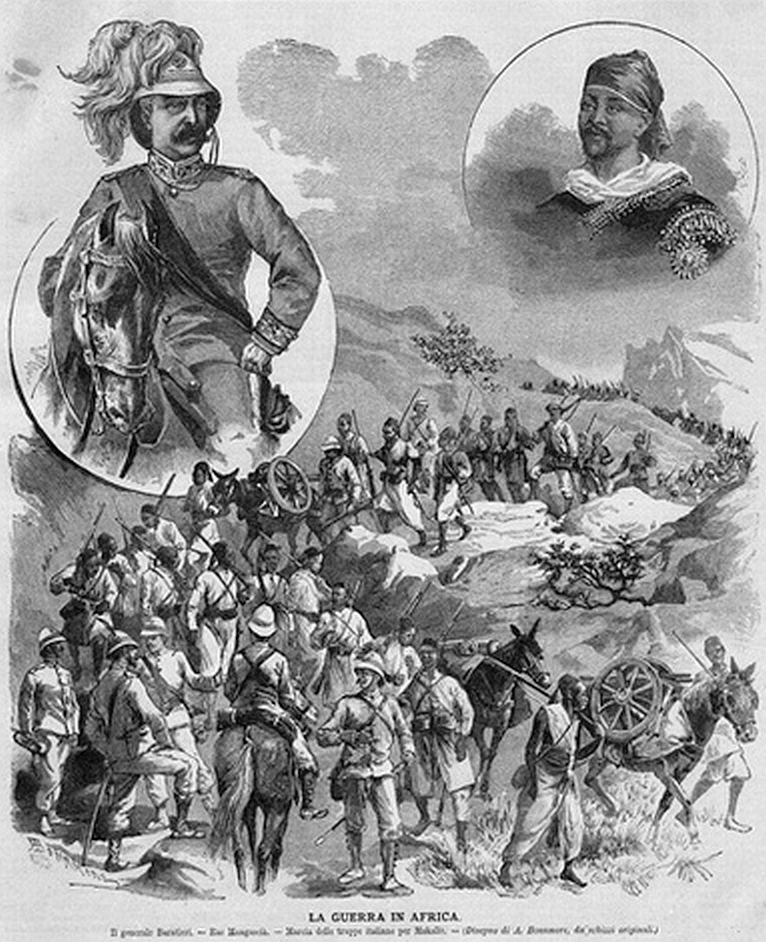
Oreste Baratieri on the advance on Mek'ele (Il Secolo Illustrato)

== The battle ==
Ras Mengesha then hurriedly retreated further south, which at least offered him the opportunity to lure the Italians chasing him further away from their supply bases and deeper into enemy territory. This should make it more difficult for the Italians to protect their growing supply lines from increasing Tigrayan and Ethiopian partisan actions. Again (as with Senafe), Ras Mengesha had to leave his camp to the Italians, who burned it. Only a small rearguard should cover Ras Mengesha's retreat.

On 9 October, two battalions of Italian colonial troops under General Giuseppe Arimondi's and Major Giovanni Ameglio's command, a total of six companies, met Mengesha's rearguard at Debra Ailà (near Antalò). With the help of their superior artillery, the Italians forced the breakthrough through the pass. The losses remained relatively small on both sides and - in contrast to the previous battles - were even relatively balanced.

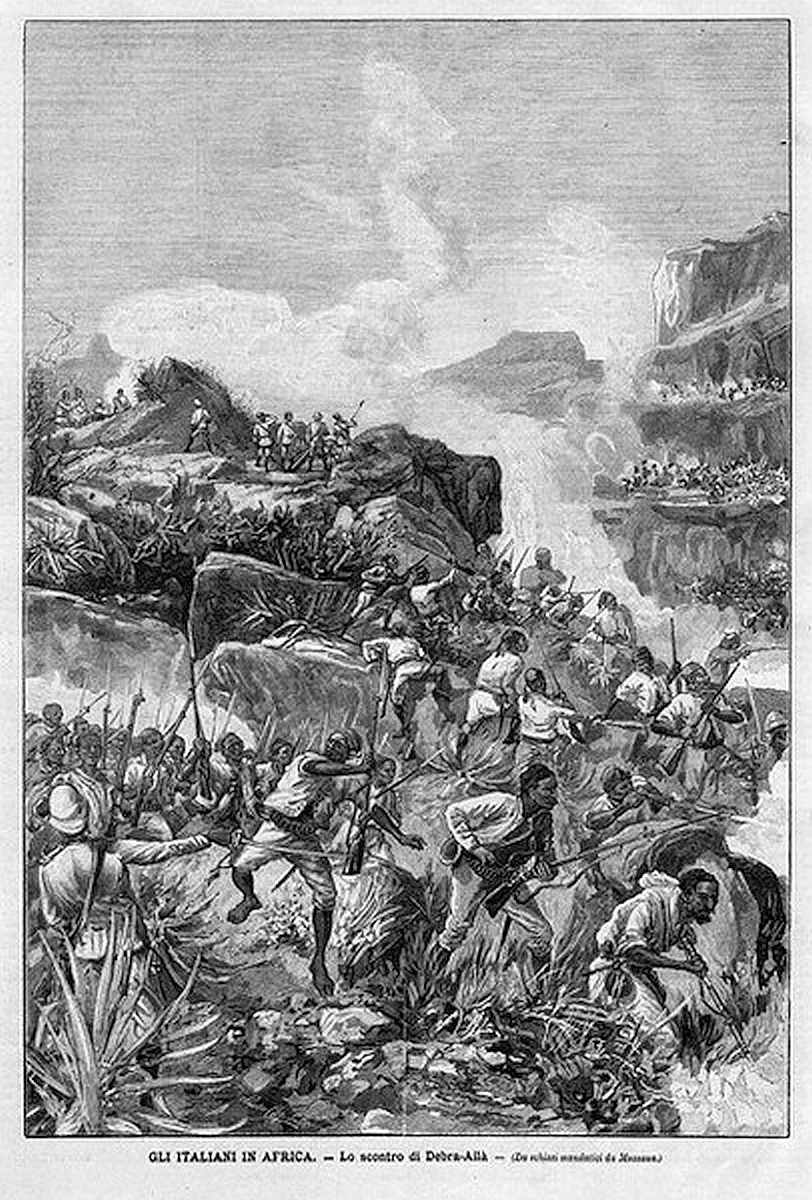
Depiction of the battle in Il Secolo Illustrato

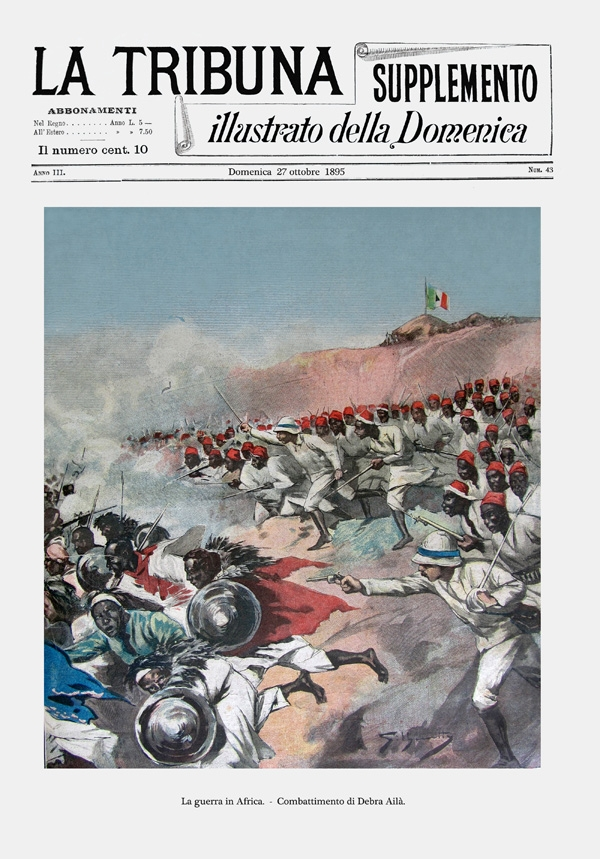
Contemporary heroization in an Italian magazine

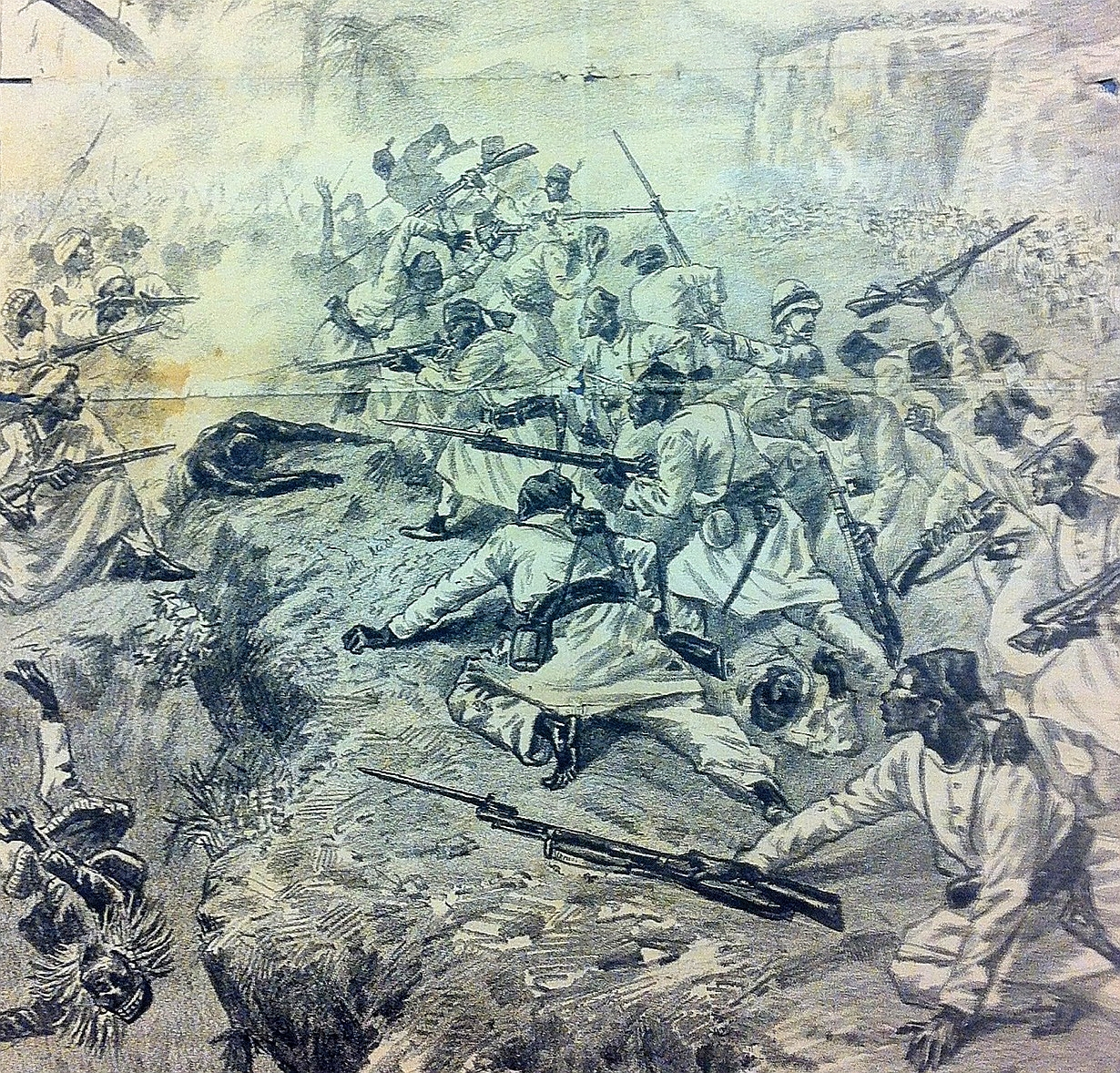
Depiction of the battle in Il Valore Italiano

== Aftermath ==
The Battle of Debra Ailà did not bring the Italian invaders any military advantage. For Ras Mengesha the defeat at Debra Ailà meant another setback, but the Italians had not succeeded in destroying or at least decisively weakening the Tigrayan army. It was to be the last victory of the Italians in this colonial war, the course of which changed fundamentally after the intervention of the Ethiopian Emperor Menelik II.

Although the way was clear for another Italian advance southwards after the battle, and Italian advance detachments actually occupied the strategically important mountain Amba Alagi only a few days later, their lines of communication were repeatedly disrupted and interrupted by troops guarding nearby Ras Mengeshas. Soon the Italians were cut off and trapped on the mountain. This brought the Italian advance into Ethiopia to a standstill. The intervention of the Ethiopian emperor led to a united action of all peoples of the country against the invaders. While the Italian commander-in-chief Oreste BaratieriIn mid-October 1895 the subjugated Tigray paid homage to Mek'ele and appointed his deputy Arimondi as the new military governor of Tigray, Menelik gathered a large army south of the Amba Alagi, in Dese.

The Italians and Askari who broke through to Amba Alagi at Debra Ailà also included the department of Major Pietro Toselli. He was attacked and defeated by Menelik's and Ras Mengesha's troops on the Amba Alagi barely two months after the victory at Debra Ailà, Toselli fell in battle. The actual "winner" of Debra Ailà, General Arimondi, only survived a few months. After the Italians were defeated at Amba Alagi in December 1895 and expelled from Mek'ele in January 1896, Arimondi was finally killed in the decisive Battle of Adua in early March 1896.
