= Giuseppe Galliano =

Italian army officer (1846–1896)

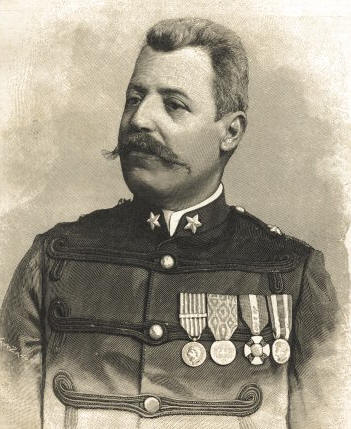
- Born: 27 September 1846; Vicoforte, Kingdom of Sardinia
- Died: 1 March 1896 (aged 49); Adwa, Ethiopian Empire
- Military career
- Allegiance: Kingdom of Italy
- Branch: Royal Italian Army
- Rank: Lieutenant Colonel
- Conflicts: Mahdist War; Second Battle of Agordat; First Italo-Ethiopian War; Battle of Coatit; Battle of Mek'ele; Battle of Adwa †
- Awards: Gold Medal of Military Valor

Giuseppe Galliano (Vicoforte, 27 September 1846 – Adwa, 1 March 1896) was an officer of the Royal Italian Army, mostly known for his role during the First Italo-Ethiopian War. He perished in the Battle of Adwa and was posthumously awarded the Gold Medal of Military Valour.

== Early years ==
The son of an officer who, in 1821, had joined Santorre di Santarosa in the constitutional motions in Piedmont, Giuseppe Galliano entered the Military College in Asti on 24 October 1854. In 1864 he entered the Military School, which he left two years after as second lieutenant in the arm of Infantry, and was assigned to the 24th Regiment Como with which he participated to the war against Austria in 1866. In 1870 he was promoted to the rank of Luogotenente (Lieutenant) and in 1873 he was moved to the new Alpini body; on 19 July 1883, he became a captain and was sent to the 58th Infantry regiment Abruzzi. In 1884 he passed to the 82nd "Turin" Infantry Regiment; on 6 November 1887, he left for Eritrea under the command of General Alessandro Asinari di San Marzano, to avenge the Dogali massacre. Since the Abyssinians “disappeared like fog in the sunlight” the expedition corps was repatriated. On 10 March 1888, Captain Galliano returned to his Regiment and stayed in Turin for two years; in 1890, he was sent again to Eritrea.

== African Colonial Service ==
=== Battle of Agordat ===
In the battle of Agordat (1893) Captain Giuseppe Galliano commanded a Battalion of Colonial Eritreans, as well as a battery of mountain artillery served from Sudanese soldiers. At first, the battle was favourable to Galliano's troops but later the Dervishes, excited by their military and religious heads, tried to close in on them. Galliano could not check their offensive and had to order the retreat. Later, he ordered a violent bayonet counterattack, leading it himself on horse. Shortly the Dervishes fled in disarray. The booty of guns, ammunition and standards is now in the Museum of Artillery of Turin. Between the flags is the famous green banner, which was one painful and disheartening loss to the Dervishes.

When King Umberto I assigned him the Gold Medal of Military Valor, Captain Galliano wrote to his brother: “A single thing disturbs my joy for such honour: it is too different from the one given to my officers, who have earned it for me, to whom the Ministry was not as generous as to me”. Galliano distinguished himself for his skill in instructing native troops and constituting them in solid and homogenous units.

=== Battle of Coatit ===
In January 1895 began the battle of Coatit between Italian troops and those from Ras Mangascià, governor of Tigray, who was defeated and forced to take shelter near Senafe, pursued by Italian troops. Giuseppe Galliano, promoted to major after Agordat, had a great role in this operation. The action earned him a Silver Medal of Military Valor, and the Knight Cross of the Order of Saints Maurice and Lazarus by Monarch's motu proprio.

=== Defence of the fort of Mek'ele ===
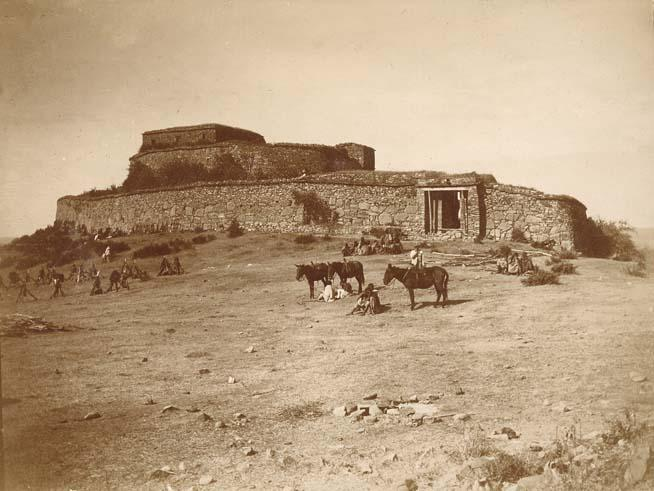
Enda Yesus Fort, Mek'ele, Ethiopia, ca. 1890

In the autumn of 1895, all of Tigray was occupied; the Governor of Eritrea, General Oreste Baratieri returned to Massaua. A few weeks later, Negus Menelik II denounced the undue Italian occupation of Tigray, a territory that the Treaty of Wuchale assigned to Ethiopia. Menelik II collected huge supplies of provisions, cattle, arms and ammunition and gathered a big army in order to march against the Italian column. In December the Abyssinian army could boast 100,000 men, while the Italian forces had been divided into two contingents: 5000 men were stationed in Adigrat and 5000 in Mek'ele, under General Giuseppe Arimondi.
Arimondi intended to support Major Pietro Toselli, isolated with its company on the plateau of Amba Alagi in an advanced position. However, Governor Baratieri telegraphed that the garrison in Mek'ele had to be maintained and prohibited general Arimondi from moving. On 7 December approximately 2000 soldiers, commanded by Major Toselli, died heroically.

Arimondi, who had advanced as far as Aderà, (20 km from Amba Alagi), could only collect the few survivors and go back to Adigrat, leaving Giuseppe Galliano with 1.300 men in the fort of Enda Yesus near Mek'ele. The army of the Negus began the siege of the fort. Galliano resisted for two months the continuous attacks of 100,000 Abyssinian armed men. The small garrison of approximately 1,500 men endured serious losses, mainly from diseases, but did not surrender. The peace negotiations reached the peak on 17 January 1896, when Menelik II offered to stop hostilities and let the Italians in Mek'ele go free, asking in compensation that the Treaty of Wuchale be cancelled. The Italian government, though demanding the liberation of the besieged ones of Mek'ele, remained firm in asking that the Treaty be renewed. The siege finally came to an end when Menelik agreed to free the Italian army and negotiate. This was good news for Galliano because his army was facing defeat and was short of water supplies. Galliano with all his men joined the Italian forces near the Eritrean border. For the defence of the fort of Enda Yesus (then called in his honour “Fort Galliano”), Galliano received another Silver Medal of Military Valor and was moved up to lieutenant colonel in January 1896.

=== The Battle of Adwa and death ===
In the last days of February, the Italian army had supplies only for a few days. It was necessary to retreat or to advance to Adwa in order to reach the warehouses of Adi Ugri and Asmara. Baratieri was more favourable to the retreat but the other generals were inclined to the attack. In the night between 29 February and 1 March, Baratieri decided at last to face the enemy with his 20,000 men against 100,000 of Menelik II. He was led to a risky manoeuvre, and to engage battle, by a telegram of Francesco Crispi (head of the government) sent on 25 February: “This one is a military tuberculosis, not a war”. On the night of 29 February, the army moved in three columns: Colonel Galliano took part in the centre one, 2,500 soldiers guided by General Giuseppe Arimondi. On the Rajo Mount, Galliano tried to cover the left wing of the brigade of Arimondi by blocking the Abyssinians.

According to accounts recorded after the battle, Colonel Galliano was wounded and subsequently withdrew from the fighting in search of medical assistance. While receiving treatment, he was reportedly captured by Ethiopian warriors, some of whom recognized him from the siege of Mekelle. Contemporary Italian sources claimed that Galliano was executed by his captors, who accused him of violating the terms under which he had previously surrendered. According to these accounts, Emperor Menelik II ordered that the prisoner be brought before him, but Galliano stated that he did not want to see "that pig." An enraged Ethiopian warrior then decapitated him, and presented his head to the Emperor.

A second Gold Medal of Military Valor was conferred posthumously to Galliano. Galliano, the first Alpine decorated with the gold medal, was also the first officer who received two Gold Medals of Military Valour, thus breaking off the tradition of not awarding it twice to the same person.

== Legacy ==
In Ceva (Cuneo), is a Museum dedicated to Galliano, as well as several public buildings and a bronze monument.

Galliano is also the namesake of Galliano, a herbal liqueur.

== Honours ==
- Knight of the Order of Saints Maurice and Lazarus

“motu proprio of Monarch” - 1896

- Knight of the Order of the Crown of Italy
- Silver Medal of Military Valour

“For the combats of Coatit” - 1893

- Gold Medal of Military Valour

“Decisive victory over the Dervishes” - Agordat (Eritrean), December 1893

- Silver Medal of Military Valour

“For the heroic defence of the fort of Enda Jesus (Mek'ele)” - 1896

- Gold Medal of Military Valour

“Engaged with his battalion on the Rajo Mount, in the more critical moment of the fight, he fought with valour. [...] he, although wounded, persisted in the resistance with the few soldiers near him, urging the others to end with honour, until he was killed. Adua, (Ethiopia), 1 March 1896

== See also ==
- Oreste Baratieri
