= Pietro Toselli =

Officer in the Italian Army

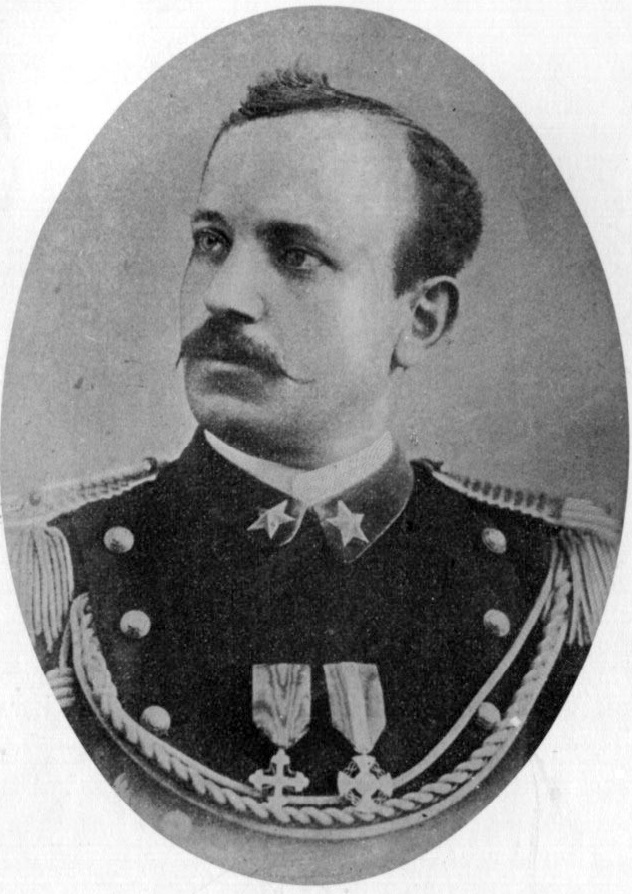
- Born: 22 December 1856; Peveragno, Piedmont, Sardinia
- Died: 7 December 1895 (aged 38); Bet Mariam, Tigray, Ethiopia
- Military career
- Allegiance: Italy
- Branch: Royal Italian Army
- Service years: 1874–1895
- Rank: Major
- Unit: Corpo Speciale per L'Africa (Special Corps of Africa).
- Conflicts: First Italo-Ethiopian War; Battle of Coatit; Battle of Senafe; Battle of Amba Alagi †
- Awards: Military Order of Savoy

Pietro Toselli (22 December 1856 – 7 December 1895) was an Italian military officer, prominent for his participation and leadership in the First Italo-Ethiopian War (1895–1896).

Born in Peveragno, a commune in Piedmont, Italy in 1856, he was the youngest of three siblings. His father was Giovanni Maria Toselli, and his mother Teresa (Botasso) Toselli. His older brother Enrico Toselli was a noted psychiatrist and university professor. Pietro Toselli joined the Italian army in 1874 and was commissioned second lieutenant of artillery in 1878. After finishing the tree year curriculum for artillerymen, he opted for additional training in military engineering. After finishing his education in 1880, he became a first lieutenant.

In 1887, he was promoted to captain and first came to Africa in 1888 to carry out topographical work in the new colony of Italian Eritrea. Returning to Italy, he published the book Pro Africa italica ("For Italian Africa") under the pseudonym "Un Eritreo". In 1894, he returned to Eritrea to take command of the 4th Askari Battalion of the Corpo Speciale per L'Africa (African Special Corps). He led Italian forces to victory at the Battle of Halai on the 18 December 1894, when his troops defeated the Eritrean forces of Bahta Hagos, who were besieging the Italian fort at Halai.

On 13 January 1895, following the outbreak of the First Italo-Ethiopian War, he commanded the 4th Askari Battalion at the Battle of Coatit under the command of Oreste Baratieri. After the Ethiopian retreat Toselli, and the 4th Askari Battalion formed the Italian vanguard that caught up with the Ethiopian forces at the Battle of Senafe.

When the Royal Italian Army invaded Tigray, Toselli was sent with 1,450 soldiers, 700 militiamen, and four cannons to occupy and fortify the forward position at Amba Alagi. On the 7 December 1895, the Battle of Amba Alagi began when the position came under attack by the troops of Makonnen Wolde Mikael. Due to a miscommunication with Major general Giuseppe Arimondi, Toselli believed Arimondi was moving south to reinforce him and chose to stand his ground. After several hours of fighting and being almost surrounded he gave the order for a general retreat. He led the retreating column north to Bet Mariam. Toselli was by then exhausted and could not move on with his men, he died from a gunshot wound near Bet-Mariam when the advancing Ethiopians reached his position.

His body was returned to Italy two years after his death and he is buried in his hometown of Peveragno.
