= Battle of Amba Alagi =

Battle of Amba Alagi refers to:

- Battle of Amba Alagi (1895)
- Battle of Amba Alagi (1941)
