= First Italo-Ethiopian War =

1895–1896 war between the Ethiopia and Italy

- Part of the Scramble for Africa
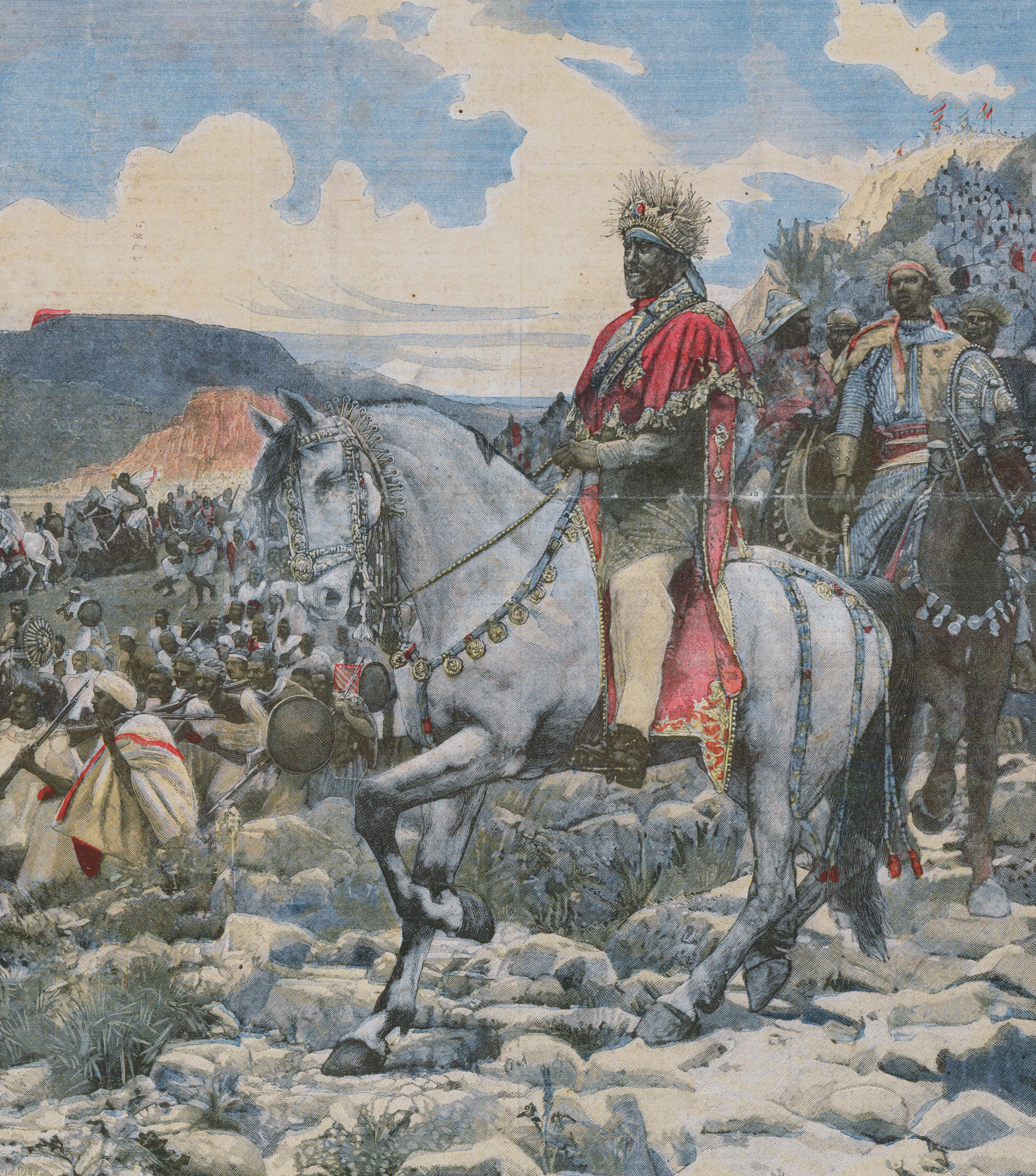
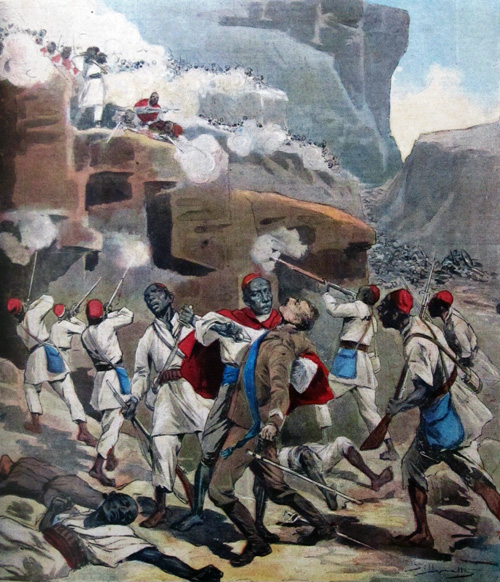
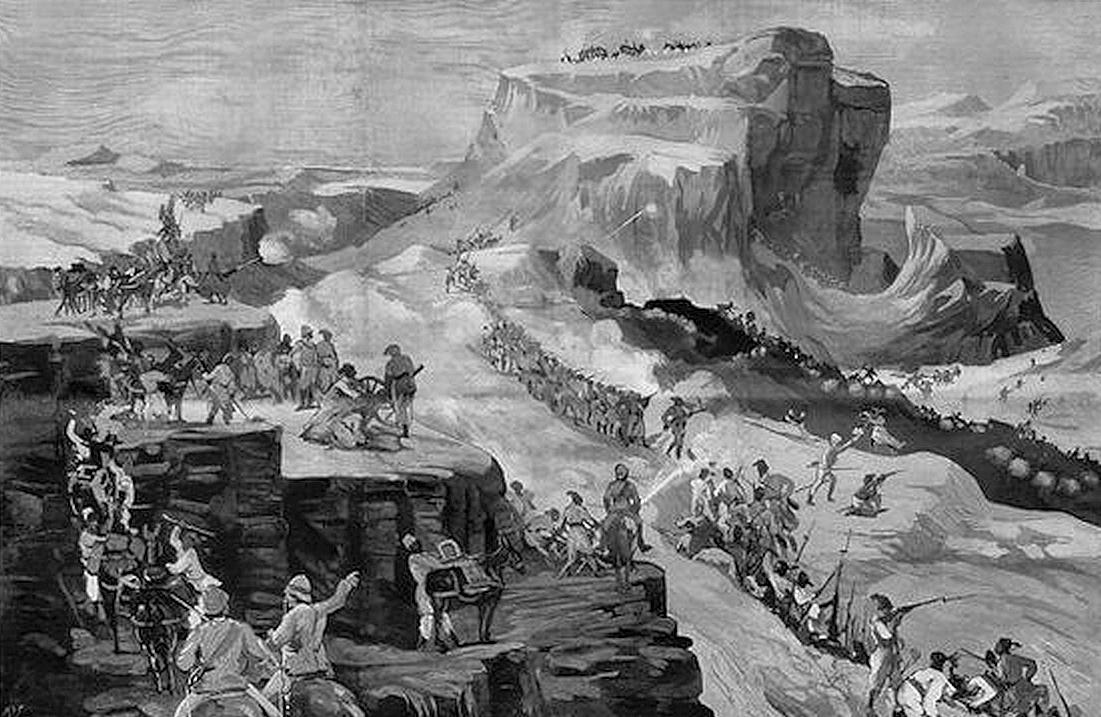
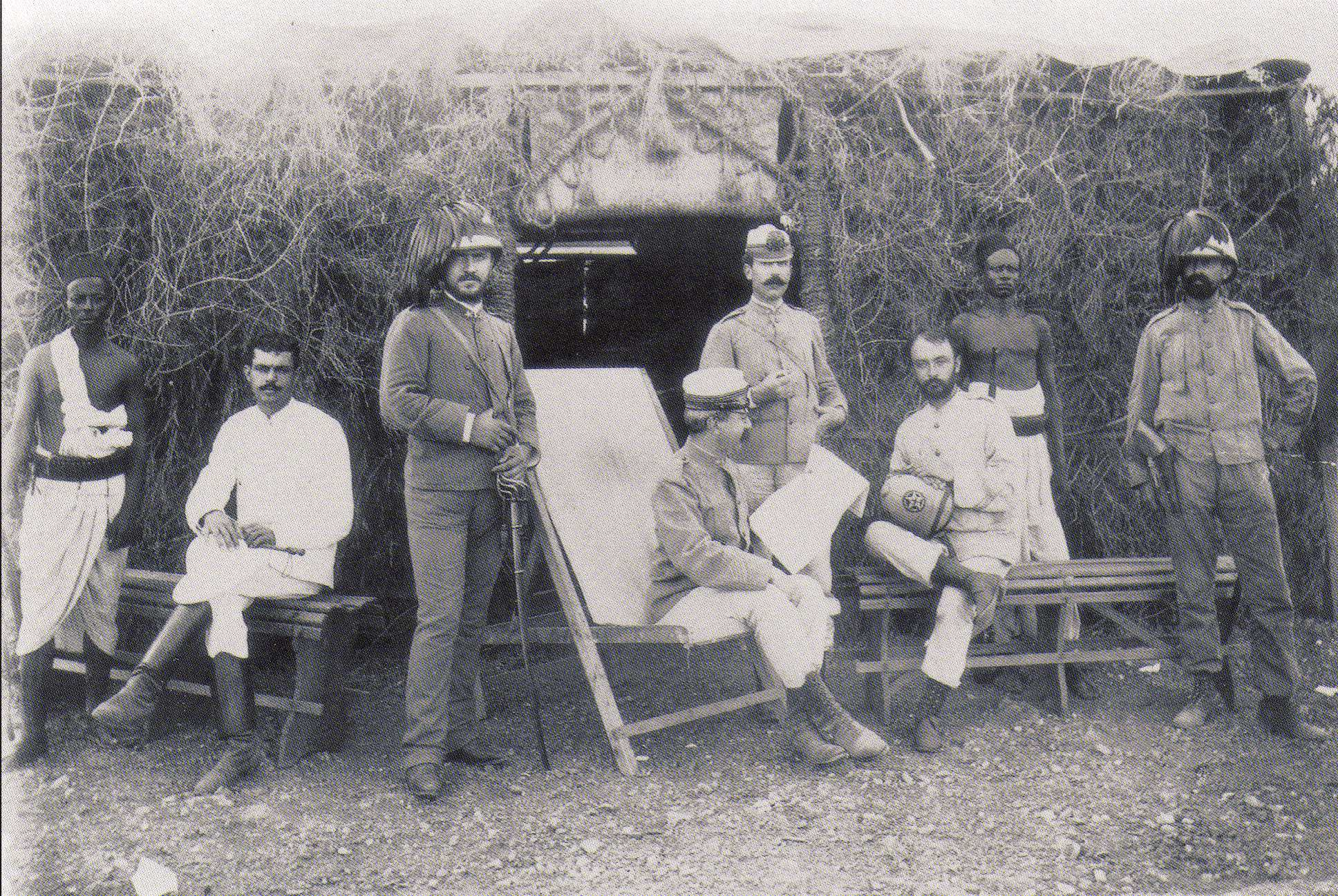
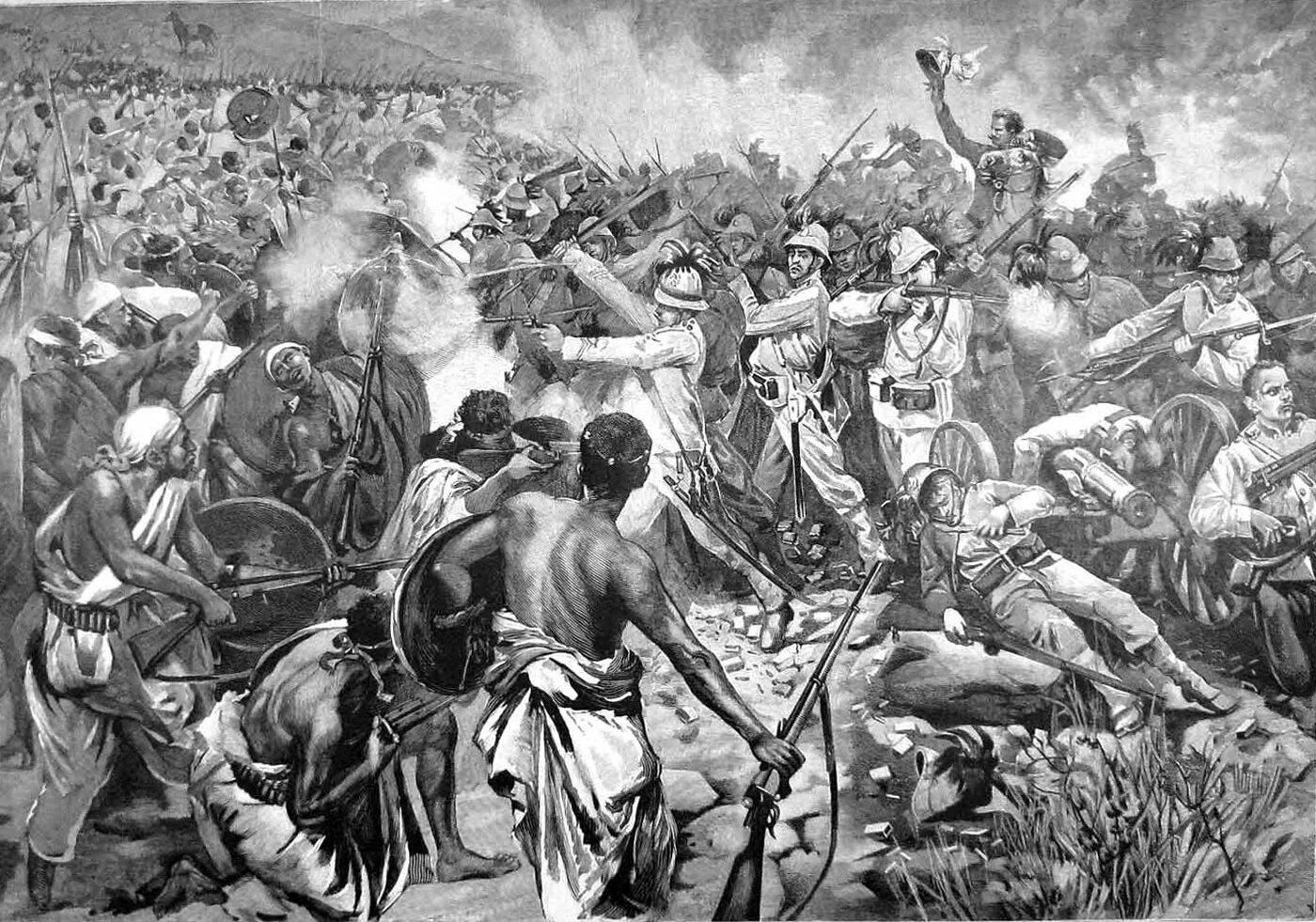
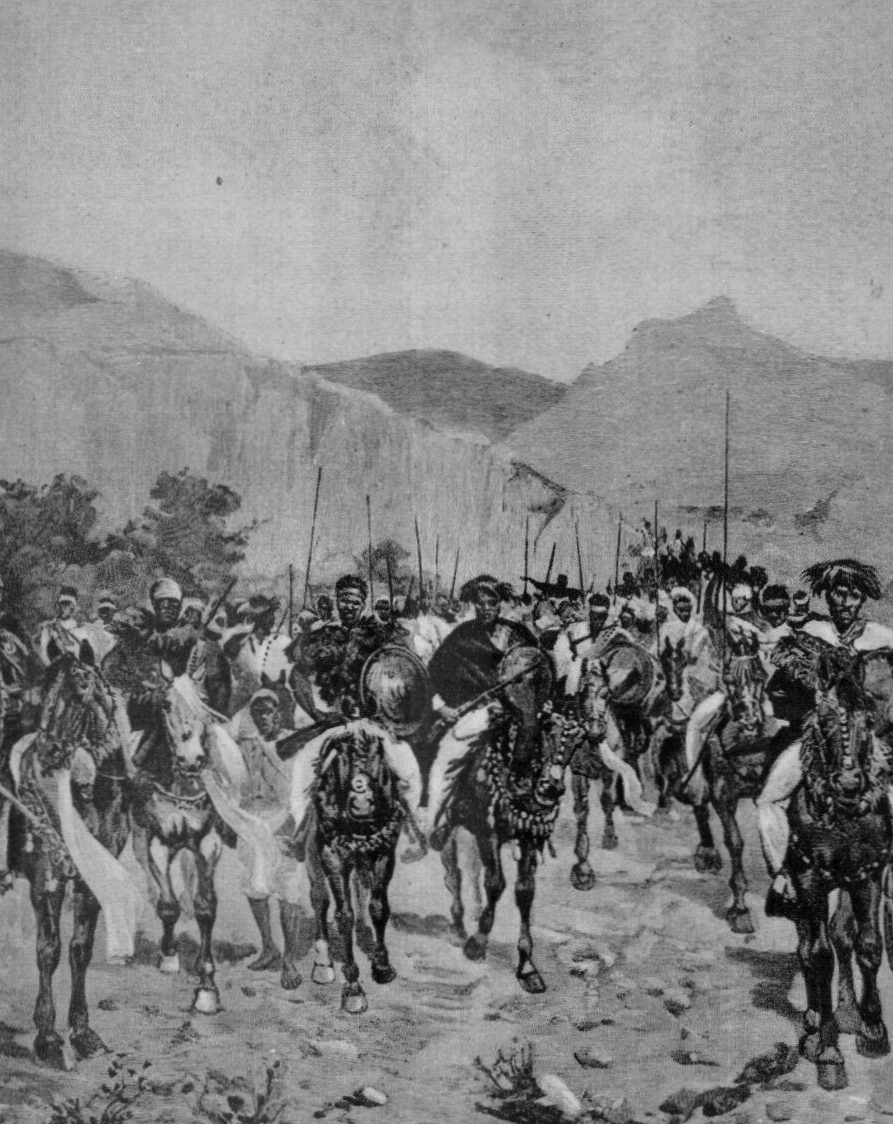
- Clockwise from top left: Menelik II at Adwa; The death of Major Toselli; Oreste Baratieri in Eritrea; Ras Mengesha on horseback; Illustration of Dabormida's last rally; Depiction of the Battle of Debra Ailà.
Date	13 January 1895 – 23 October 1896 (1 year, 10 months, 1 week and 1 day)
Location	Italian Eritrea and Ethiopia
Result	Ethiopian victory
Territorial changes	Sovereignty of Ethiopia confirmed; border with Italian Eritrea delineated

Belligerents
Kingdom of Italy	Ethiopian Empire

Commanders and leaders
Francesco Crispi; Oreste Baratieri; Vittorio Dabormida †; Giuseppe Arimondi †; Giuseppe Galliano †; Pietro Toselli †	Menelik II; Taytu Betul; Ras Makonnen; Mengesha Yohannes; Welle Betul; Ras Alula

Strength
35,000–43,700	80,000–125,000

Casualties and losses
9,313 killed (Note: 4,424 Italians and 4,889 askaris killed.); 1,428 wounded 3,865 captured	~10,000 killed

The First Italo-Ethiopian War, also referred to as the First Italo-Abyssinian War, or simply known as the Abyssinian War in Italy (Italian: Guerra d'Abissinia), was fought between Italy and Ethiopia from 1895 to 1896. It originated from the disputed Treaty of Wuchale, which the Italians claimed turned Ethiopia into an Italian protectorate, while the Ethiopians claimed that the treaty simply ensured peace between the two powers. Full-scale war broke out in 1895, with Italian troops from Italian Eritrea achieving initial successes against Tigrayan warlords at Coatit, Senafe and Debra Ailà, until they were reinforced by a large Ethiopian army led by Emperor Menelik II. The Italian defeat came about after the Battle of Adwa, where the Ethiopian army dealt the outnumbered Italian soldiers and Eritrean askaris a decisive blow and forced their retreat back into Eritrea. The war concluded with the Treaty of Addis Ababa. Because this was one of the first decisive victories by African forces over a European colonial power, this war became a preeminent symbol of pan-Africanism and secured Ethiopia's sovereignty until the Second Italo-Ethiopian War of 1935–36.

== Background ==
Isma'il Pasha, Khedive of Egypt and better known as 'Isma'il the Magnificent', spent the early 1870s extending Egyptian control along the Red Sea coast, appointing Werner Munzinger governor of Massawa in 1871 and occupying Bogos the following year, as part of his efforts to give Egypt an African empire. By 1875 he had encircled Ethiopia along four routes from the coast and moved to press the advantage with a direct invasion aimed at annexing the country outright, but the attempt ended in humiliating defeat in the Egyptian–Ethiopian War. After Egypt's bankruptcy in 1876 followed by the Ansar revolt under the leadership of the Mahdi in 1881, the Egyptian position in Eritrea was hopeless with the Egyptian forces cut off and unpaid for years. By 1884 the Egyptians began to pull out of both Sudan and Eritrea.

On 3 June 1884, the Hewett Treaty was signed between Britain, Egypt and Ethiopia that allowed the Ethiopians to occupy parts of the dissolved Habesh Eyalet which allowed Ethiopian goods to pass in and out of Massawa duty-free. From the viewpoint of Britain, it was highly undesirable that the French replace the Egyptians in Massawa as that would allow the French to have more naval bases on the Red Sea that could interfere with British shipping using the Suez Canal, and as the British did not want the financial burden of ruling Massawa, they looked for another power who would be interested in replacing the Egyptians. The Hewett treaty seemed to suggest that Massawa would fall into the Ethiopian sphere of influence as the Egyptians pulled out. After initially encouraging the Emperor Yohannes IV to move into Massawa to replace the Egyptians, London decided to have the Italians move into Massawa. In his history of Ethiopia, British historian Augustus Wylde wrote: "England made use of King John [Emperor Yohannes] as long as he was of any service and then threw him over to the tender mercies of Italy...It is one of our worst bits of business out of the many we have been guilty of in Africa...one of the vilest bites of treachery".

On 5 February 1885, Italian troops landed at Massawa to replace the Egyptians. The Italian government for its part was more than happy to embark upon an imperialist policy to distract its people from the failings in post Risorgimento Italy. In 1861, the unification of Italy was supposed to mark the beginning of a glorious new era in Italian life, and many Italians were gravely disappointed to find that not much had changed in the new Kingdom of Italy with the vast majority of Italians still living in abject poverty. To compensate, a chauvinist mood was rampant among the upper classes in Italy with the newspaper Il Diritto writing in an editorial: "Italy must be ready. The year 1885 will decide her fate as a great power. It is necessary to feel the responsibility of the new era; to become again strong men afraid of nothing, with the sacred love of the fatherland, of all Italy, in our hearts". The struggle against the Ansar from Sudan complicated Yohannes's relations with the Italians, whom he sometimes asked to provide him with guns to fight the Ansar and other times he resisted the Italians and proposed a truce with the Ansar.

On 24 January 1887, at a village named Saati, an advancing Italian army detachment defeated the Ethiopians in a skirmish, but it ended with the numerically superior Ethiopians surrounding the Italians in Saati after they retreated in face of the enemy's numbers. Some 500 Italian soldiers under Colonel de Christoforis together with 50 Eritrean auxiliaries were sent to support the besieged garrison at Saati. At Dogali on his way to Saati, de Christoforis was ambushed by an Ethiopian force under Ras Alula, whose men armed with spears skillfully encircled the Italians who retreated to one hill and then to another higher hill. After the Italians ran out of ammunition, Ras Alula ordered his men to charge and the Ethiopians swiftly overwhelmed the Italians in an action that featured bayonets against spears. The Battle of Dogali ended with the Italians losing 23 officers and 407 other ranks killed. As a result of the defeat at Dogali, the Italians abandoned Saati and retreated back to the Red Sea coast. Italian newspapers called the battle a "massacre" and excoriated the Regio Esercito for not assigning de Chistoforis enough ammunition. Having, at first, encouraged Emperor Yohannes to move into Eritrea, and then having encouraged the Italians to also do so, London realised a war was brewing and decided to try to mediate, largely out of the fear that the Italians might actually lose.

The defeat at Dogali made the Italians cautious for a moment, but on 10 March 1889, Emperor Yohannes died after being wounded in battle against the Ansar and on his deathbed admitted that Ras Mengesha, the supposed son of his brother, was actually his own son and asked that he succeed him. The revelation that the emperor had slept with his brother's wife scandalised intensely Orthodox Ethiopia, and instead the Negus Menelik was proclaimed emperor on 26 March 1889. Ras Mengesha, one of the most powerful Ethiopian noblemen, was unhappy about being by-passed in the succession and for a time allied himself with the Italians against the Emperor Menelik. Under the feudal Ethiopian system, there was no standing army, and instead, the nobility raised up armies on behalf of the Emperor. In August 1889, the Italians advanced inland again and took Asmara.

=== Outbreak of the war ===
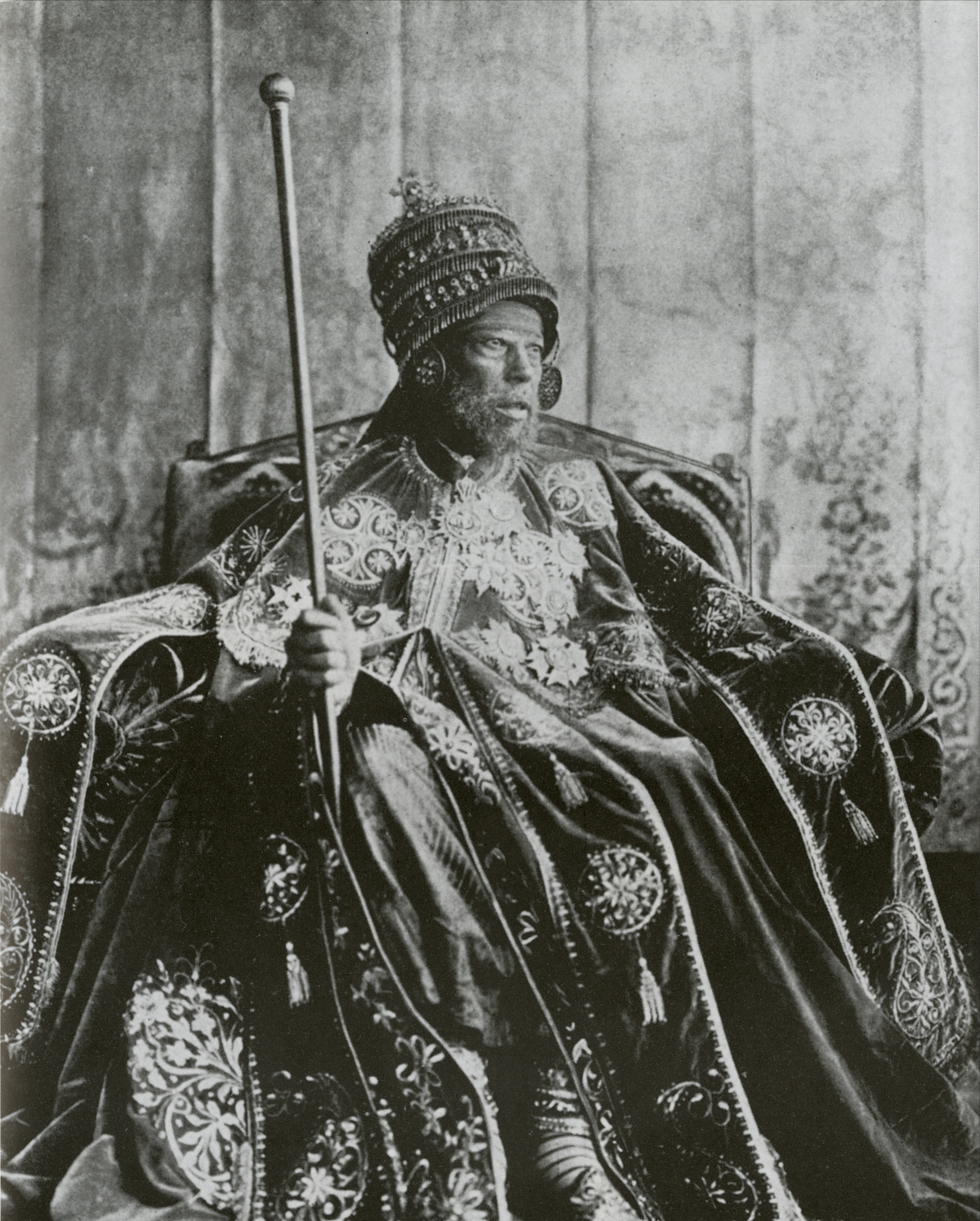
Emperor Menelik II

On 25 March 1889, the Shewa ruler Menelik II declared himself Emperor of Ethiopia (or "Abyssinia", as it was commonly called in Europe at the time). Barely a month later, on 2 May he signed the Treaty of Wuchale with the Italians, which apparently gave them control over Eritrea, the Red Sea coast to the northeast of Ethiopia, in return for recognition of Menelik's rule, a sum of money and the provision of 30,000 rifles and 28 artillery cannons.

However, the bilingual treaty did not say the same thing in Italian and Amharic; the Italian version did not give the Ethiopians the "significant autonomy" written into the Amharic translation. The Italian text stated that Ethiopia must conduct its foreign affairs through Italy (making it an Italian protectorate), but the Amharic version merely stated that Ethiopia could contact foreign powers and conduct foreign affairs using the embassy of Italy. Italian diplomats, however, claimed that the original Amharic text included the clause and Menelik knowingly signed a modified copy of the Treaty. In October 1889, the Italians informed all of the other European governments because of the Treaty of Wuchale that Ethiopia was now an Italian protectorate and therefore the other European nations could not conduct diplomatic relations with Ethiopia. With the exceptions of the Ottoman Empire, which still maintained its claim to Eritrea, and Russia, which disliked the idea of an Orthodox nation being subjugated to a Roman Catholic nation, all of the European powers accepted the Italian claim to a protectorate.

The Italian claim that Menelik was aware of Article XVII turning his nation into an Italian protectorate seems unlikely given that the Emperor Menelik sent letters to Queen Victoria in late 1889 and was informed in the replies in early 1890 that Britain could not have diplomatic relations with Ethiopia on the account of Article XVII of the Treaty of Wuchale, a revelation that came as a great shock to the Emperor. The tone of Victoria's letter was polite. The Queen informed Menelik that the restrictions on the import of arms were no longer in force and to prove this mentioned that Ras Makonnen received permission "to pass two thousand rifles through Zeila, return to Harar" i.e. from Italy. But on the question of further diplomatic contacts, she left no doubt in Menelik's mind: "We shall communicate to the Government of our Friend His Majesty the King of Italy copies of Your Majesty's letter and of our reply."

Francesco Crispi, the Italian Prime Minister, was an ultra-imperialist who believed the newly unified Italian state required "the grandeur of a second Roman empire". Crispi believed that the Horn of Africa was the best place for the Italians to start building the new colonial empire. Because of the Ethiopian refusal to abide by the Italian version of the treaty and despite economic handicaps at home, the Italian government decided on a military solution to force Ethiopia to abide by the Italian version of the treaty. In doing so, they believed that they could exploit divisions within Ethiopia and rely on tactical and technological superiority to offset any inferiority in numbers. The efforts of Emperor Menelik, viewed as pro-French by London, to unify Ethiopia and thus bring the source of the Blue Nile under his control was perceived in Whitehall as a threat to their influence in Egypt. As Menelik became increasingly successful in expanding Ethiopia, the British government courted the Italians to counter Ethiopian expansion.

The only European ally of Ethiopia was Russia. The Ethiopian emperor sent his first diplomatic mission to St. Petersburg in 1895. In June 1895, the newspapers in St. Petersburg wrote, "Along with the expedition, Menelik II sent his diplomatic mission to Russia, including his princes and his bishop". Many citizens of the capital came to meet the train that brought Prince Damto, General Genemier, Prince Belyakio, Bishop of Harer Gabraux Xavier and other members of the delegation to St. Petersburg. On the eve of war, an agreement providing military help for Ethiopia was concluded. Russia had been trying to gain a foothold in Ethiopia, and in 1894, after denouncing the Treaty of Wuchale in July, it received an Ethiopian mission in St. Petersburg and sent arms and ammunition to Ethiopia. The Russian travel writer Alexander Bulatovich, who went to Ethiopia to serve as a Red Cross volunteer with the Emperor Menelik, made a point of emphasizing in his books that the Ethiopians converted to Christianity before any of the Europeans ever did, described the Ethiopians as a deeply religious people like the Russians, and argued the Ethiopians did not have the "low cultural level" of the other African peoples, making them equal to the Europeans.

In 1893, judging that his power over Ethiopia was secure, Menelik repudiated the treaty; in response the Italians ramped up the pressure on his domain in a variety of ways, including the annexation of small territories bordering their original claim under the Treaty of Wuchale, and finally culminating with a military campaign and across the Mareb River into Tigray (on the border with Eritrea) in December 1894. The Italians expected disaffected potentates like Negus Tekle Haymanot of Gojjam, Ras Mengesha Yohannes, and the Sultan of Aussa to join them; instead, all of the Ethiopians flocked to the Emperor Menelik's side in a display of both nationalism and anti-Italian feeling, while other peoples of dubious loyalty (e.g. the Sultan of Aussa) were watched by Imperial garrisons. In June 1894, Ras Mengesha and his generals appeared in Addis Ababa carrying large stones which they dropped before the Emperor Menelik (a gesture that is a symbol of submission in Ethiopian culture). There was overwhelming national unity in Ethiopia as various feuding noblemen rallied behind the emperor who insisted that Ethiopia, unlike the other African nations, would retain its freedom and not be subjugated by Italy.

Menelik had spent much of his reign building up a vast arsenal of modern weapons and ammunition acquired though treaty negotiations and purchases from the Russians, French, British, and even the Italians. In 1884, Count Pietro Antonelli, the Italian envoy to Menelik II, was able to import 50,000 Remington rifles and 10 million cartridges in exchange for 600 camels bearing gold, ivory and civet. After Italian sources dried up, Menelik strove to increase his other imports, in the few years preceding the war the arms trade expanded considerably. In November 1893, Menelik's Swiss friend and advisor, Alfred Ilg, went to Paris where he traded gold and ivory for 80,000 Fusil Gras mle 1874, 33 pieces of artillery and 5,000 artillery shells. Menelik had also purchased 15,000 quick-firing rifles left over from the Franco-Hova Wars from the French arms trader Léon Chefneux. By the end of 1894, 30,000 Berdan rifles and loads of ammunition were imported from Russia, and at least 250,000 cartridges were imported from French Somaliland.

== Course of the war ==
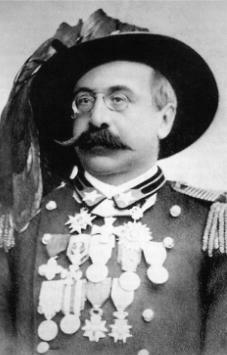
Divisional General Oreste Baratieri

In December 1894, Bahta Hagos led a rebellion against the Italians in Akkele Guzay, claiming support of Ras Mengesha Yohannes. Units of Divisional General Oreste Baratieri's army under Major Pietro Toselli crushed the rebellion and killed Bahta at the Battle of Halai. Baratieri suspected that Mengesha would invade Eritrea, and met him at the Battle of Coatit in January 1895. The victorious Italians chased the retreating Mengesha, defeating him again at the battle of Senafe. Baratieri promptly marched into Adigrat on March 8 and occupied Adwa on April 2. He issued a proclamation, annexing Tigray province into Italian Eritrea, then moved into Mekelle and fortified an old church above the town's spur. At this point, Emperor Menelik turned to France, offering a treaty of alliance; the French response was to abandon the Emperor in order to secure Italian approval of the Treaty of Bardo which would secure French control of Tunisia. Virtually alone, on 17 September 1895, Emperor Menelik issued a proclamation calling up the men of Abyssinia to join his army at Were Ilu. Leaders of every region in Ethiopia responded to Menelik's call to arms and would assemble an army of over 100,000 men before marching north to face the Italian invaders.

The next clash came at Amba Alagi on 7 December 1895, when Ras Makonnen brought up his largely Shewan army to the slopes of Amba Alagi in southern Tigray. They were confronted by Major Pietro Toselli with 2,000 Eritreans and local Tigrayan askaris that had joined the Italians for various reasons. Makonnen was joined by Ras Mengesha Yohannes and Welle Betul, and together they overran the Italian positions on the natural fortress, killing Major Toselli and most of his men. General Giuseppe Arimondi, who had just arrived to reinforce Toselli, was barely able to escape and retreated with 400 survivors to the unfinished Italian fort at Mekele. Arimondi left a small garrison of approximately 1,150 askaris and 200 Italians there, commanded by Major Giuseppe Galliano, and took the bulk of his troops to Adigrat, where General Oreste Baratieri was concentrating the Italian army.

The first Ethiopian troops reached Mekele in the following days. Ras Makonnen surrounded the fort at Mekelle on 18 December. By the first days of January, Emperor Menelik II, accompanied by his Queen Taytu Betul, had led their massive imperial army into Tigray and joined Ras Makonnen at Mekele on 6 January 1896. While Italian journalists filled sensational reports of their brave country holding out against "war-crazed black barbarians", Menelik had established contact with the Italian commander and gave him the opportunity to leave peacefully to Adigrat. The commander was defiant until the Ethiopians cut off the water supply to the fort and on January 21, with permission from the Italian high command, he agreed to surrender. Menelik allowed them to leave Mekelle with their weapons, and even provided the defeated Italians mules and pack animals to rejoin Baratieri. While some historians read this generous act as a sign that Emperor Menelik still hoped for a peaceful resolution to the war, Harold Marcus points out that this escort allowed him a tactical advantage: "Menelik craftily managed to establish himself in Hawzien, at Gendepata, near Adwa, where the mountain passes were not guarded by Italian fortifications."

Menelik decided against attacking the Italian headquarters at Adigrat and instead marched west towards the plateau of Adwa. Baratieri feared that the Emperor intended to invade Eritrea and hence abandoned his positions at Adigrat and moved towards the area. On February 28, 1896, Baratieri called an assembly of all his generals and informed them that their provisions would run out, and asked if the army should retreat back to Asmara or attack Menelik's army. All of his generals were opposed to retreat. Baratieri decided to rely on surprise by making up for his deficiency in manpower and issued a battle order on the next day.

=== Battle of Adwa ===
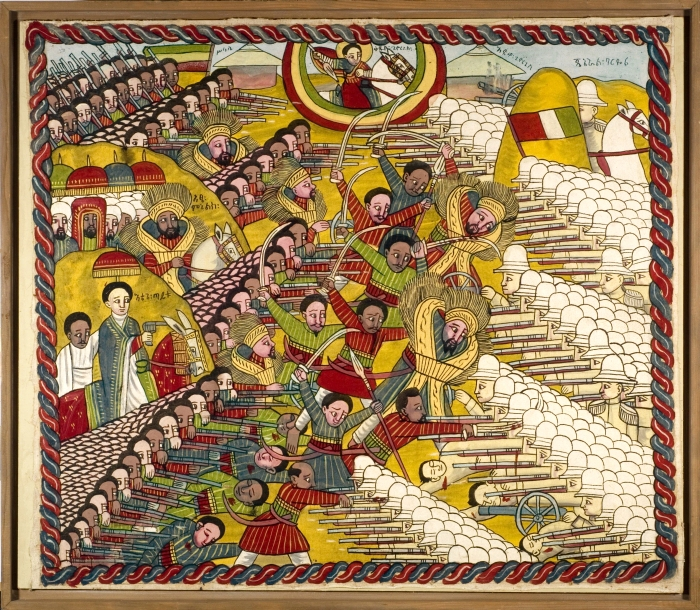
Painting depicting the Battle of Adwa

The decisive battle of the war was the Battle of Adwa on March 1, 1896, which took place in the mountainous country north of the actual town of Adwa (or Adowa). The Italian army comprised four brigades totaling approximately 17,700 men, with fifty-six artillery pieces; the Ethiopian army comprised several brigades numbering between 73,000 and 120,000 men (80–100,000 with firearms: according to Richard Pankhurst, the Ethiopians were armed with approximately 100,000 rifles of which about half were quick-firing), with almost fifty artillery pieces. General Oreste Baratieri underestimated the size of the Ethiopian force, predicating that Menelik could only field 30,000 men; also, the Ethiopians were better armed, being equipped with thousands of modern rifles and Hotchkiss artillery guns together with ammunition and shells which were superior to the Italian rifles and artillery. Menelik had ensured that his infantry and artillerymen were properly trained in their use, giving the Ethiopians a crucial advantage as the Hotchkiss artillery could fire more rapidly than the Italian artillery.

On the night of 29 February and the early morning of 1 March, three Italian brigades advanced separately towards Adwa over narrow mountain tracks, while a fourth remained camped. However, the three leading Italian brigades had become separated during their overnight march and by dawn were spread across several miles of very difficult terrain. Unbeknownst to General Baratieri, Emperor Menelik knew his troops had exhausted the ability of the local peasants to support them and had planned to break camp the next day. The Emperor had risen early when spies from Ras Alula brought him news that the Italians were advancing. The Emperor summoned the separate armies of his nobles and with the Empress Taytu Betul beside him, ordered his forces forward.

Albertone's brigade marched ahead of the Italian army, but due to poor maps and reconnaissance, marched directly into the Ethiopian forces and was subsequently hit by wave after wave of attacks. At 10:30 a.m., the Dabormida brigade, which had unsuccessfully tried to help Albertone, was in turn cut off by the strong Ethiopian northern wing on Mount Gusoso, cutting any existing link between Albertone and Dabormida's relief attempt. The battle had now split into three separate and independent engagements: on the Enda Chidane Meret pass, Albertone's Eritrean Ascaris were fighting; on Mount Rajo, those of Arimondi and Ellena; and finally, in the Mariam Shewito valley, those led by Dabormida, who were attempting a heroic resistance. In all three positions, the Ethiopians enjoyed overwhelming numerical superiority, and the Italian columns, too far apart, could not support each other. By noon, the three main Italian brigades were in full retreat, while the Dabormida brigade retreated later that afternoon.

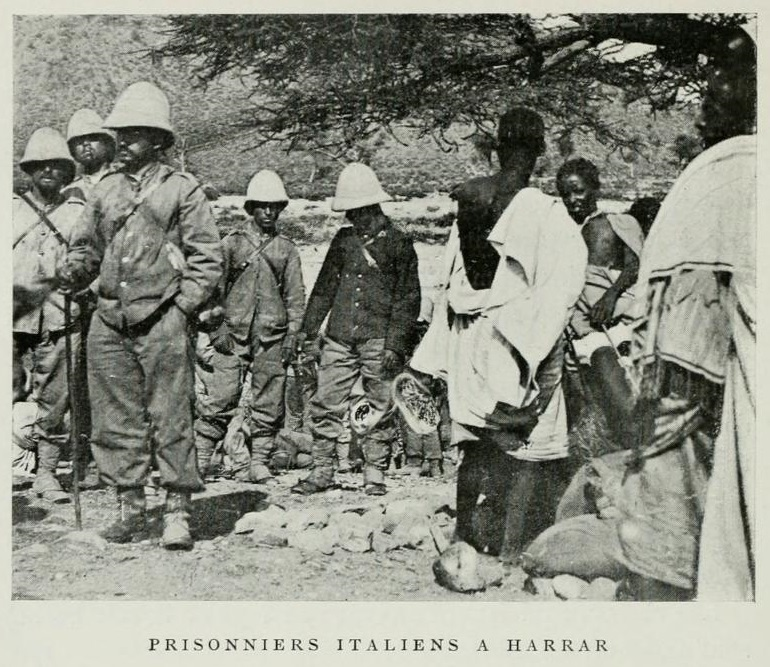
Italian prisoners of war waiting for repatriation

George Berkeley records that the Italian casualties were 6,133 men killed: 261 officers, 2,918 white NCOs and privates, 954 permanently missing, and about 2,000 ascari. Another 1,428 were wounded – 470 Italians (including 31 officers) and 958 ascari, with 1,865 Italians and 1,000–2,000 ascaris taken prisoner. Richard Caulk estimates that the number of Italians killed were 300 officers, 4,600 Italian rank and 1,000 askari for a total of 5,900 dead. As well as and 1,000 of those who escaped wounded and at least 2,000 captured. Citing contemporary figures, Caulk records Ethiopian losses to be 3,886 killed and 6,000 wounded. Whereas Berkeley estimates Ethiopian losses to be 7,000 killed and 10,000 wounded. In their flight to Eritrea, the Italians left behind all of their artillery and 11,000 rifles, as well as most of their transport. As Paul B. Henze notes, "Baratieri's army had been completely annihilated while Menelik's was intact as a fighting force and gained thousands of rifles and a great deal of equipment from the fleeing Italians." 800 captured Eritrean Ascari, regarded as traitors by the Ethiopians, had their right hands and left feet amputated, some were even castrated. The Italian prisoners were generally treated better. Although, about 70 Italian prisoners were massacred in retaliation for the death of Bashah Aboye, the officer responsible for the massacre was supposedly imprisoned by Menelik.

== Outcome and consequences ==
The Italian telegraph lines brought news of the disaster to Italy and the world almost immediately. Italy was now shaken by a political crisis and popular demonstrations. Riots broke out in several Italian cities, and within two weeks, Crispi was forced to resign amidst Italian disenchantment with "foreign adventures". Soon after the battle, Menelik II later sent a message to Antonio Baldissera informing him that he would conclude peace if Italy publicly renounced their protectorate claim over Ethiopia. Baldissera agreed to accept only if Ethiopia agreed to not accept protection from any other European powers. At this Italian arrogance, Menelik broke off talks and withdrew his original offer. Upon returning to his capital at Addis Ababa, Menelik secured the Treaty of Addis Ababa in October, which delineated the borders of Eritrea and forced Italy to recognize "absolutely and without any reserve" the independence of Ethiopia.

The Russian support for Ethiopia led to a Russian Red Cross mission, though conceived as a medical support for the Ethiopian troops it arrived too late for the actual fighting. The mission arrived in Addis Ababa some three months after Menelik's victory at Adwa. Owing to Russia's diplomatic support of her fellow Orthodox nation, Russia's prestige greatly increased in Ethiopia. The adventuresome Seljan brothers, Mirko and Stjepan, who were actually Catholic Croats, were warmly welcomed when they arrived in Ethiopia in 1899 when they misinformed their hosts by saying they were Russians.

Following this victory, the European powers moved rapidly to adjust relations with the Ethiopian Empire. Delegations from the United Kingdom and France—whose colonial possessions lay next to Ethiopia—soon arrived in the Ethiopian capital to negotiate their own treaties with this newly proven power. Quickly taking advantage of the Italian defeat, French influence increased markedly and France became one of the most influential European powers in Menelik's court. In December 1896, a French diplomatic mission in Addis Ababa arrived and on 20 March 1897 signed a treaty that was described as "véritable traité d'alliance. In turn, the increase in French influence in Ethiopia led to fears in London that the French would gain control of the Blue Nile and would be able to "force English concessions to her own pretensions in Egypt". On the eve of the Battle of Adwa, two Sudanese envoys from the Mahdiyya state arrived at Menelik's camp in Adwa to discuss concentrated action against the Italians, in July 1896 an Ethiopian envoy was present at Abdallahi ibn Muhammad's court in Omdurman. The British, fearing that Menelik would support the Mahdist revolt, sent a diplomatic mission to Ethiopia and on 14 May 1897 signed the Anglo-Ethiopian Treaty of 1897 where Menelik assured the British that he would not support the Mahdists and declared the Mahdists as the enemy of his country. In December 1897, Ras Makonnen led an expedition against the Mahdists to seize the gold producing region of Benishangul-Gumuz.

In 1935, Italy launched a second invasion, which ended in 1937 with an Italian victory and the annexation of Ethiopia to Italian East Africa. Ethiopia was occupied by Italy until the Italians were driven out in 1941 by the Ethiopian Arbegnoch, patriots with assistance from the British Empire during World War II.

== Gallery ==
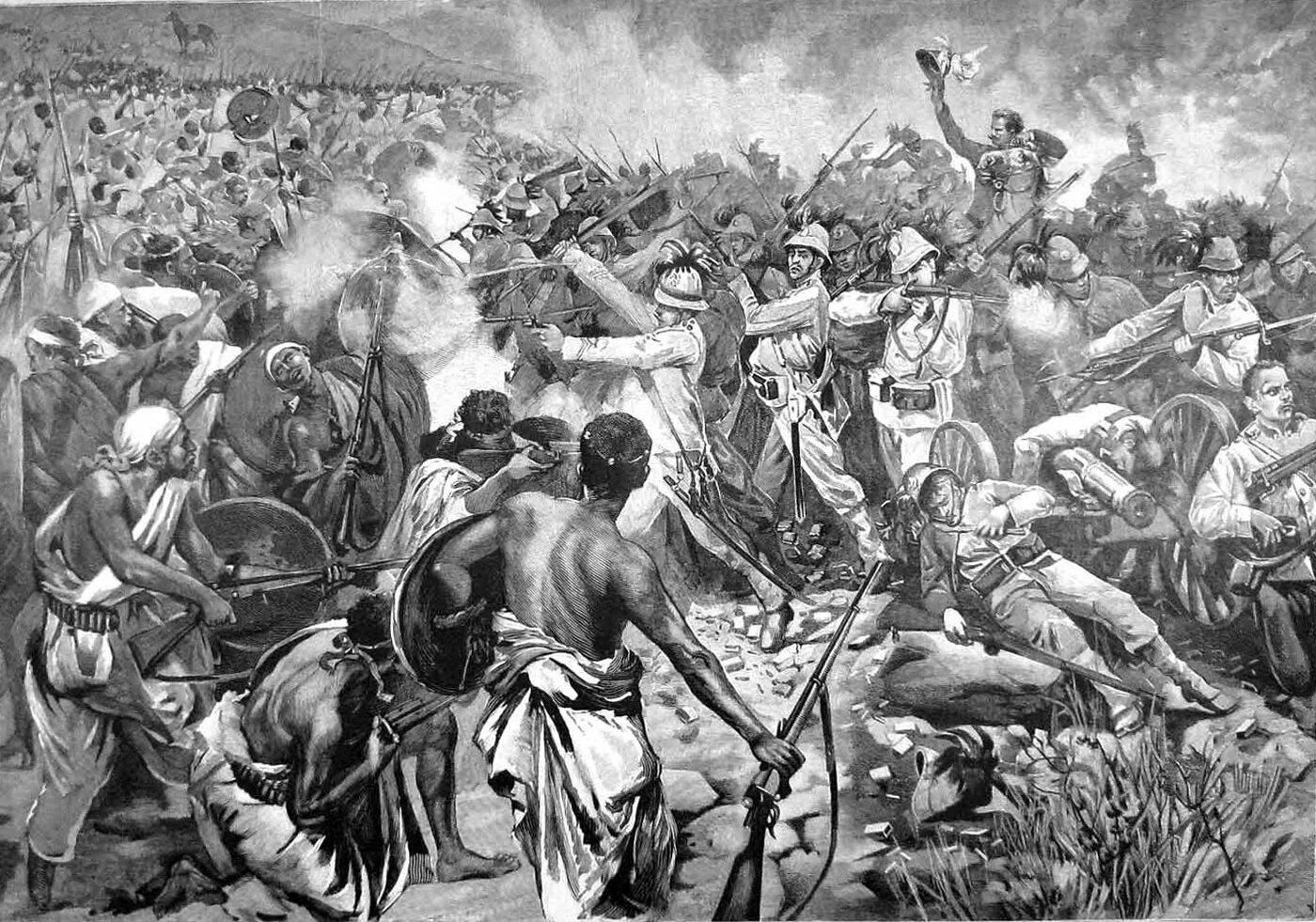
Battle of Adwa

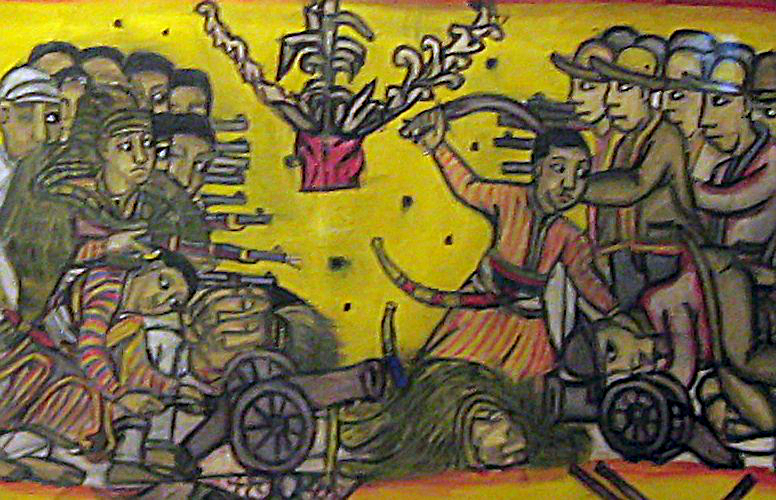
An Ethiopian painting commemorating the Battle of Adwa

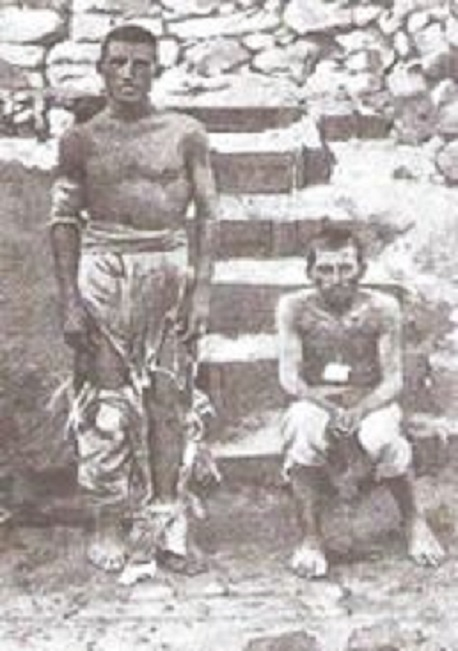
Two Italian soldiers captured and held captive after the Battle of Adwa

== See also ==
- Ethiopia–Italy relations
- Italo-Ethiopian War of 1887–1889
- Second Italo-Ethiopian War
- Italian Empire
- Military history of Ethiopia
- Military history of Italy
