= Battle of Senafe =

1895 battle of the First Italo-Ethiopian War

- Part of First Italo-Ethiopian War
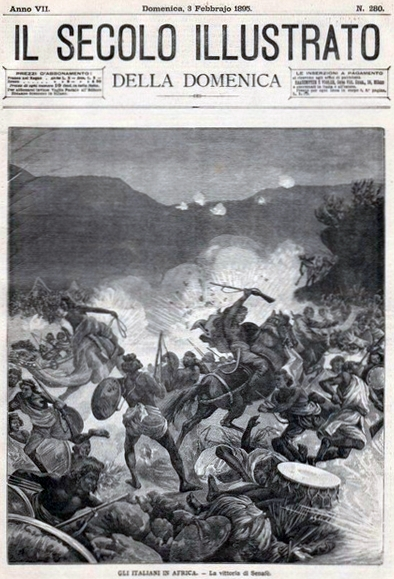
- Contemporary heroization in an Italian magazine
Date	January 15 and 16, 1895
Location	Senafe, Italian Eritrea
Result	Italian victory

Belligerents
Italy: Italian Eritrea	Ethiopia: Tigray

Commanders and leaders
Oreste Baratieri	Mengesha Yohannes

Strength
Up to 4,000 men	At least 5,500 men

Casualties and losses
123 dead, 192 wounded	2,000 dead

The Battle of Senafe took place during the First Italo-Ethiopian War on January 15 and 16, 1895. Italian colonial troops destroyed the remnants of the Tigrayan army that had withdrawn after the Battle of Coatit the day before.

== Background ==
To forestall an Italian invasion led by general Oreste Baratieri of the Ethiopian province of Tigray, the ruler of Tigray, Ras Mengesha Yohannes invaded Italian Eritrea himself. In the Battle of Coatit, however, he was repulsed by Baratieri on January 13 and 14, 1895 respectively. Ras Mengesha's army had already lost 4,500 dead and wounded 10,000 men and had used up almost all of the ammunition for the few rifles his army had.

== The Battle ==
Ras Mengesha wanted to bring the rest of his army back to Tigray and replenish it with reserves. He didn't get far, however. On the evening of January 15, Baratieri, who was chasing him, caught up with him in Senafe near Coatit . The artillery battery of Captain Ciccodicola went into position on the Amba Tericà mountain on the northern edge of the Senafe Depression. In the course of the Italian artillery bombardment and the fighting that lasted until the next morning, Ras Mengesha lost another 2,000 men, including some of his best military commanders. Upon hearing the bombardment, Ras Mengesha managed to escape to Tigray only with difficulty with a few remaining loyal followers. The Italians, on the other hand, who had been reinforced all night by advancing units, numbered about 4,000 men after the battle. The entire Ras Mengesha camp fell into their hands.

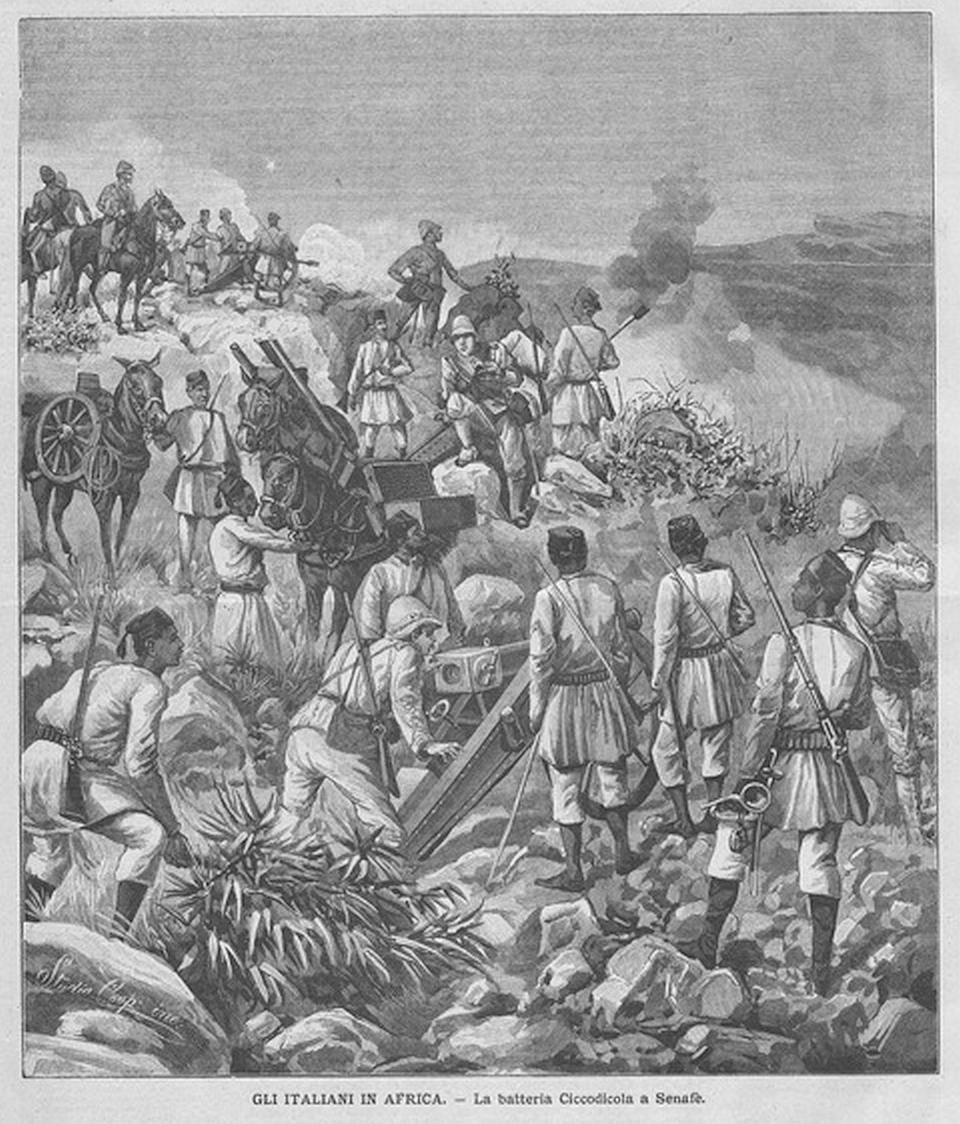
Battery of Captain Ciccodicola at Senafe (Il Secolo Illustrato)

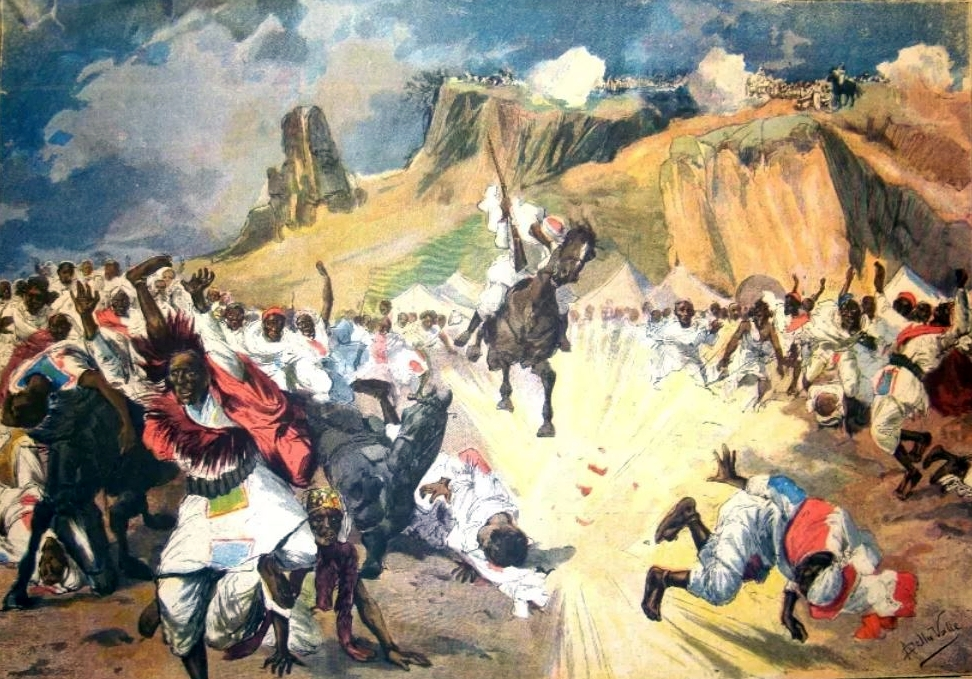
Baratieri's attack on Ras Mengesha's camp (La Tribuna Illustrata)

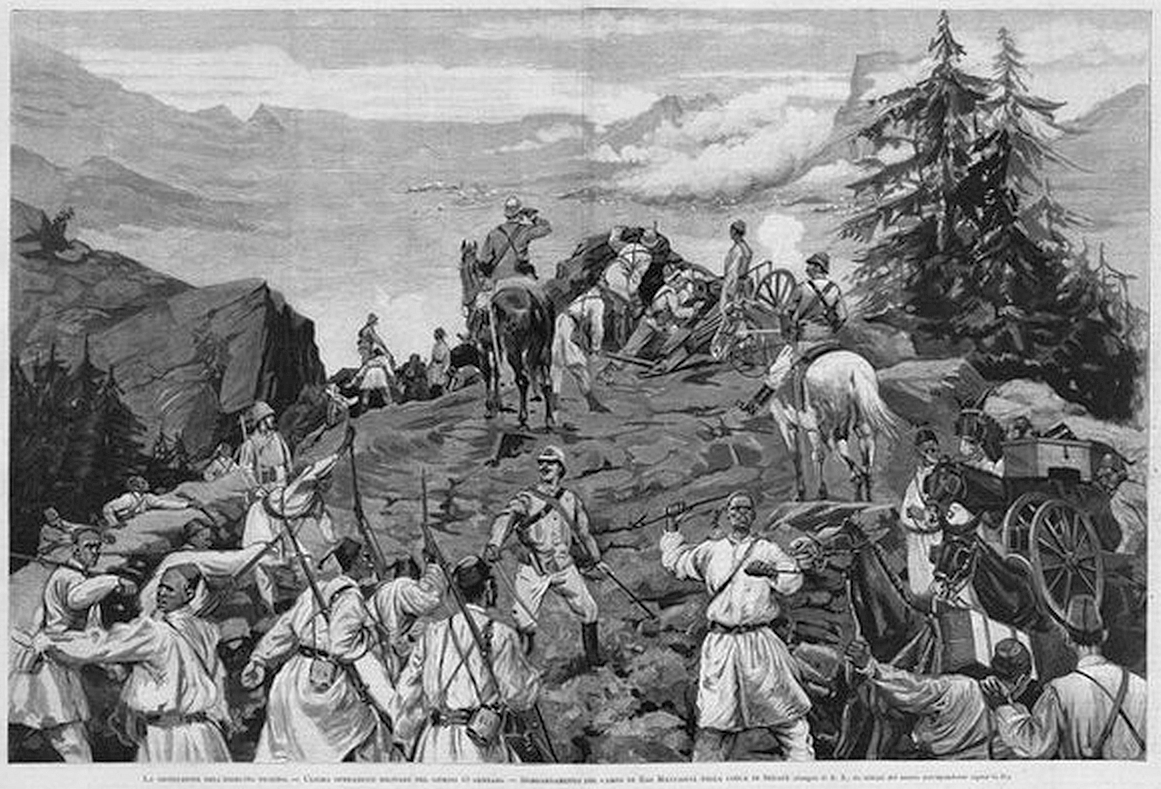
Italians at the shelling of the Senafe Depression (L'Illustrazione Italiana)

== Aftermath ==
The almost complete defeat and the defeat of the Tigrayan army cleared the way for a large-scale and far-reaching invasion of Tigray. Baratieri gathered his troops at Senafe and in January 1895 the Italians occupied Adwa, Adigrat and Tigrays capital Mek'ele . With the beginning of the rainy season in April 1895, they interrupted their advance and at least cleared Adua again. Ras Mengesha camped with his remaining troops at Mek'ele very close to the Italians and raised a new army with Ras Alula Engida.

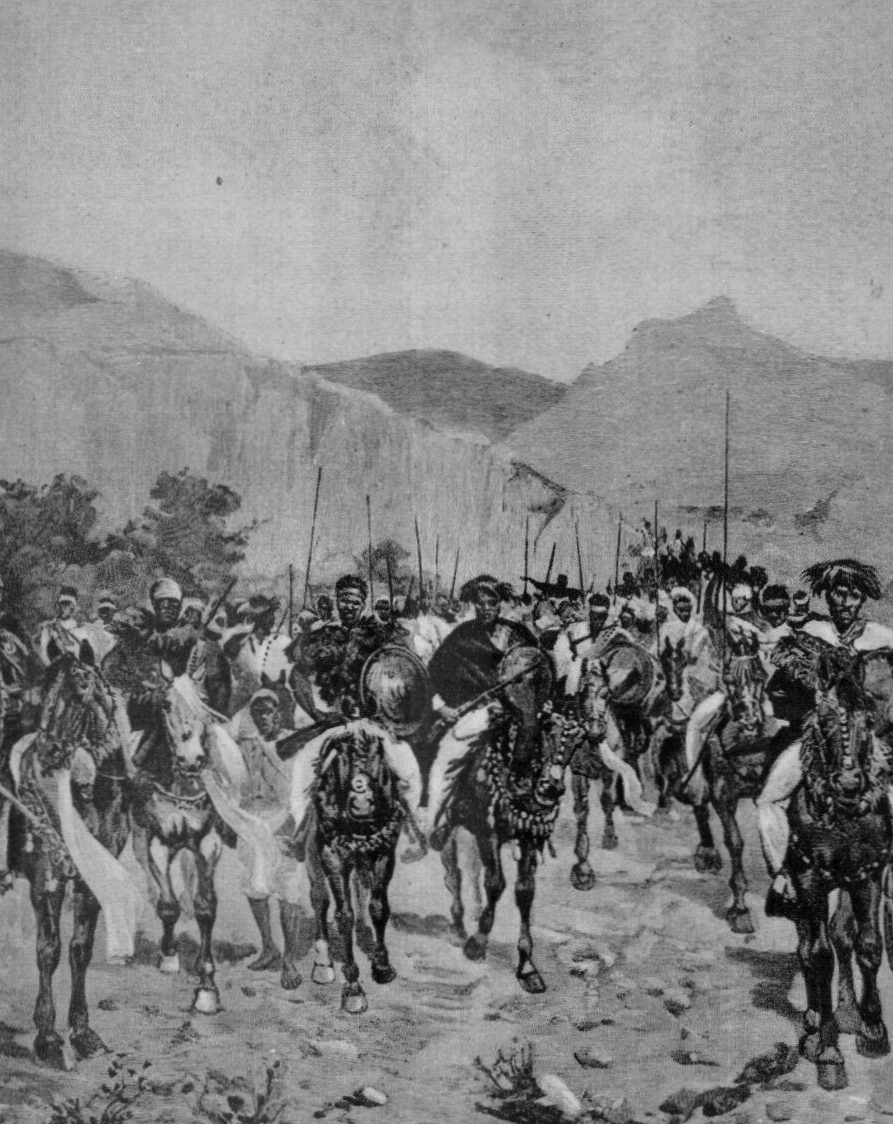
Ras Mengesha (left) on the march back (L'Illustrazione Italiana)

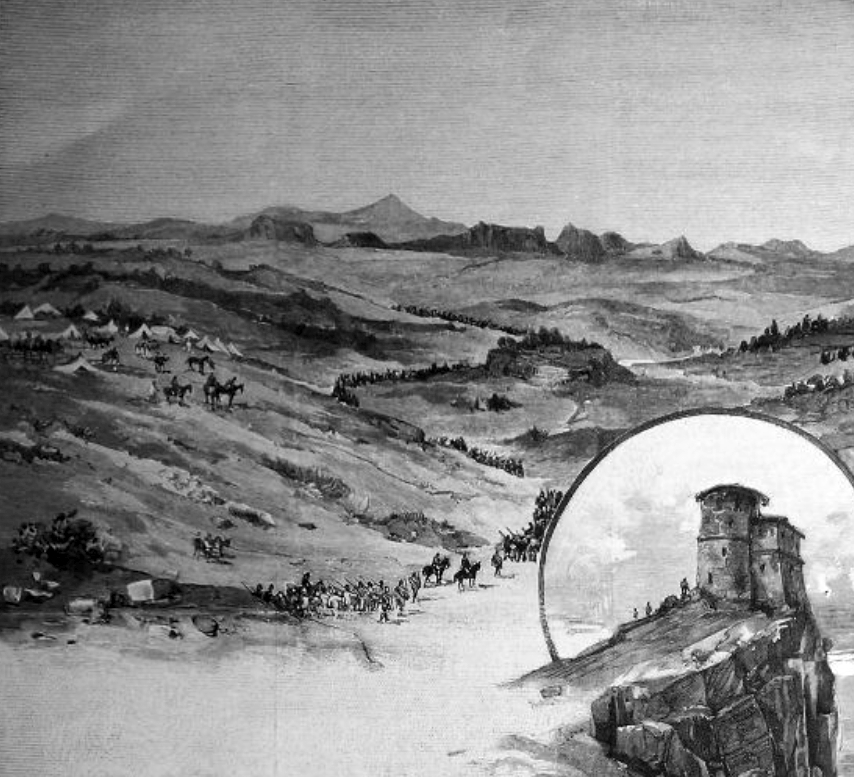
Italian advance on Mek'ele (L'Illustrazione Italiana)

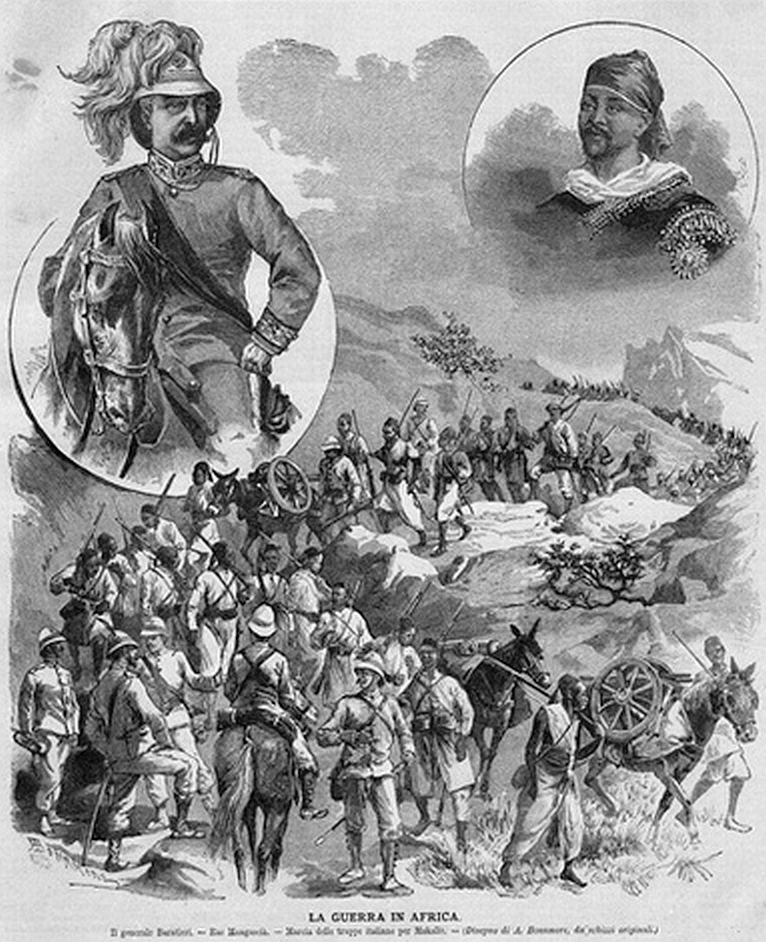
Oreste Baratieri on the advance on Mek'ele (Il Secolo Illustrato)
