= Oreste Baratieri =

Italian military officer and colonial administrator (1841–1902)

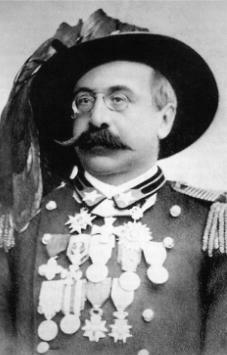

Governor of Eritrea
- In office 28 February 1892 – 22 February 1896
- Preceded by: Antonio Gandolfi
- Succeeded by: Antonio Baldissera

Personal details
- Born: 13 November 1841 Condino, Austrian Empire
- Died: 7 August 1901 (aged 59) Sterzing, Austria-Hungary

Military service
- Branch/service: Italian Army
- Rank: Major General
- Battles/wars: Expedition of the Thousand; Battle of the Volturno; Third Italian War of Independence; Battle of Custoza; Mahdist War; Battle of Kassala; First Italo–Ethiopian War; Battle of Coatit; Battle of Senafe; Battle of Adwa

Oreste Baratieri (né Oreste Baratter, 13 November 1841 – 7 August 1901) was an Italian military officer and colonial administrator who served as the governor of Eritrea from 1892 to 1896.

== Early career ==
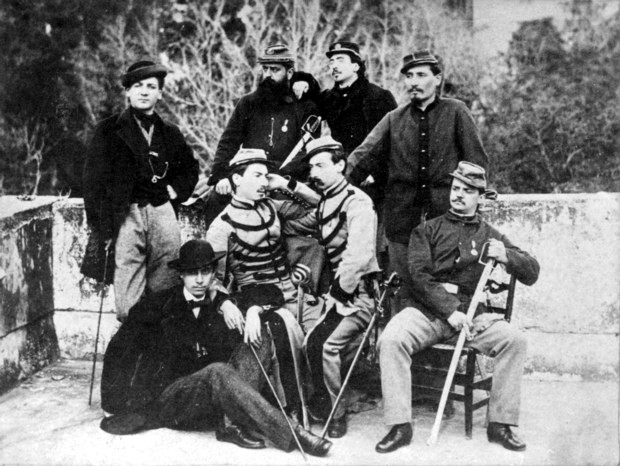
Baratieri (standing, second from right) pictured with other Redshirts on 3 October 1860, after the Battle of the Volturno

Born in Condino (County of Tyrol, now Trentino), Baratieri began his career as a volunteer for Giuseppe Garibaldi's Redshirts, where he served during the Expedition of the Thousand from 1860 to 1861.

Following the unification of Italy, Baratieri pursued a military career joining the regular Italian Army and fighting at the Battle of Custoza on 24 June 1866 and the Battle of Mentana (1867). In 1874 he took part in the Antinori geographical expedition in Tunisia, on behalf of the Italian Geographical Society. He was appointed colonel in Cremona in 1886. He took part, as a colonel of the Bersaglieri, in the military colonial campaigns in Eritrea in 1887-88 and again in 1890 and 1891 as second in command. Elected deputy for the Historical Left in Breno, in the Province of Brescia, Baratieri had his seat confirmed for seven legislatures, from 1876 to 1895.

Rising to the rank of general by 1891, Baratieri was appointed commander of Italian forces in colonial Africa and the following year became governor of Eritrea. Baratieri would spend several years fighting with enemy forces along the border from 1893 to 1895, winning several victories over the Mahdists, particularly at the Battle of Kassala on 17 July 1894.

== Italo-Ethiopian War ==
Following Ethiopian Emperor Menelik II and Italy's dispute over the Treaty of Wuchale, Italy launched an invasion of the Ethiopian Empire. Returning briefly to Italy, Baratieri reportedly promised crowds to bring back Menelik in a cage. In late 1895 Baratieri led a force of 25,000 Italian troops and Eritrean Ascari into Ethiopia.

However, Menelik had spent several years re-equipping his soldiers with modern arms and ammunition for such a conflict—at times with Italian help—and called up an army that vastly outnumbered the Italian forces. Baratieri spent nearly a year of the First Italo–Ethiopian War evading a decisive confrontation. In February 1896, however, the impatient Italian government of Francesco Crispi ordered Baratieri to engage the Ethiopians. Unknown to Baratieri, a confidential Cabinet decision had been made to replace him, and his successor General Antonio Baldissera was already on his way to Eritrea.

On the evening of 28 February 1896, Baratieri met in conference with his four Brigade commanders at Sauria. The general himself favored a partial withdrawal, noting that the Ethiopian forces under Menelik were believed to be short of supplies and would be obliged soon to disperse. However both his brigadiers and his orders from Rome insisted on an advance into mountainous territory.

On 29 February, Baratieri marched in four separate columns on the Ethiopians at Adwa, where they outnumbered his immediate command of 9,894 men by more than ten to one. The attack, poorly conducted, relying on mediocre military maps, quickly led to the separation of the various Italian columns, which were then surprised and destroyed one after the other. Baratieri demonstrated mediocre military skills in the circumstances and quickly lost control of the situation, unable to avert catastrophe and himself barely escaping death or capture. As a result of the disaster, Italy was forced to sign the humiliating Treaty of Addis Ababa guaranteeing Ethiopian sovereignty.

== Later years ==
Accused of abandoning his command for having preceded his troops during the retreat after Adwa, he was held responsible by the authorities in Rome for the three Italian defeats at Amba Alagi, Mekelle, and Adwa. Arrested on 21 March 1897, he was subsequently subjected to a humiliating trial in Asmara. Although later acquitted of all charges in order to avoid compromising the honour of the armed forces, he was nonetheless placed on the retired list and effectively forced to abandon his military career.

In the final years of his life, he resided in Arco and Venice. There, he wrote Memoirs of Africa, in which he reflected on his experiences in Africa. He also strongly criticized Italian colonialism and European methods of subjugating Africa, which he described as inhumane and destructive. According to the former general, the fate of Africans was comparable to that of the Native Americans, to be exterminated and replaced by European settlers.

For several years he also served as editor of the Italian Military Review. He later became a Freemason and was awarded the 33rd and final degree of the Ancient and Accepted Scottish Rite. He died suddenly in Sterzing (then part of Austro-Hungarian Tyrol, today in the province of Bolzano), where he had gone to visit relatives. His tomb is located in the main cemetery of the municipality of Arco, in the province of Trento.

Political offices
Preceded by Antonio Gandolfi	Commander of Eritrea; 1892–1896	Succeeded by Antonio Baldissera (governor)
