= Battle of Coatit =

1895 battle of the First Italo-Ethiopian War

- Part of First Italo–Ethiopian War
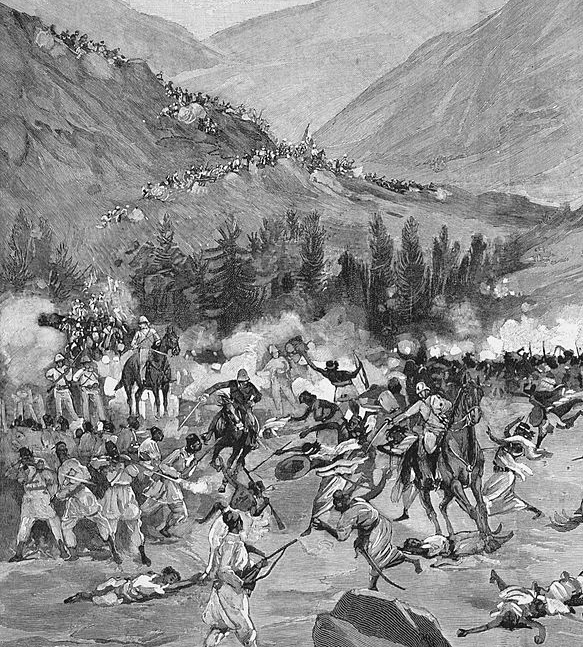
- Battle of Coatit by Ed Ximenes
Date	13 January 1895
Location	Quatit, Italian Eritrea
Result	Italian victory

Belligerents
Kingdom of Italy: Italian Eritrea	Ethiopia: Tigray

Commanders and leaders
(Kingdom of Italy) Giuseppe Galliano	(Ethiopian Empire) Ras Mengesha

Strength
3,883 (3,712 Ascari, 66 Italian officers, 105 Italian rankers); 4 mountain guns	12,000 (with rifles); 7,000 (with swords and spears)

Casualties and losses
95 killed (incl. 3 officers); 229 wounded	1,500 killed 3,000 wounded

The Battle of Coatit was fought on 13 January 1895 between Italy and Ethiopian proxies led by Tigrayan Prince Ras Mengesha Yohannes in what is now Eritrea. It was the opening battle of the First Italo–Ethiopian War, and was a significant victory for the Italians, as they rebuffed an invasion force.

== Background ==
By 1894, the relationship between the Italian colonialists and the Ethiopians had become strained. Ethiopian emperor Menelik had repudiated the Treaty of Wuchale, and was consolidating his power with plans to oust the Italians. Former Italian allies, the Tigrayans warlords Ras Mengesha Yohannes, Ras Alula and Bahta Hagos traveled to Addis Ababa to seek forgiveness from the Negus for their dealings with the colonial governor, General Oreste Baratieri. Menelik forgave them and offered Mengesha the crown of Tigray in exchange for his loyalty and help in evicting the Italians. In December 1894, Bahta Hagos led a rebellion in Akkele Guzay, which set the stage for open warfare between the Italians and the Ethiopians.

Baratieri mobilized his forces in response to Hagos' rebellion, immediately suspecting the complicity of Mengesha. The Italian colonial army in Eritrea consisted of only 3,883 men (66 officers; 105 Italians in the ranks; the rest being natives). There were three battalions (about 1,100 men each) of Askaris, five companies each; one battery of four mountain guns; about 400 irregulars; and 28 Askari lancers. Baratieri marched on the Tigrian capital of Adowa, but with his supply lines exposed, he abandoned it after four days. His army retreated to the fort at Adi Ugri and later moved to a strategic point along Mengesha's invasion route at Coatit. Ras Mengesha's army was estimated at about 12,000 riflemen and about 7,000 sword and spearmen. On January 12, 1895, advance scouts had located Mengesha's forces encamped nearby. Baratieri's forces then occupied Coatit and a dawn attack was ordered.

Major Pietro Toselli and his 4th battalion took the left, in the center was Major Giuseppe Galliano and the 3rd battalion. The paths and heights on the left were guarded by the irregulars under Sanguinetti and Mulazzani. Behind Galliano, Major Hidalgo and 2nd Battalion were in reserve, and the artillery under Captain Cicco di Cola was on the right with Toselli. The 5th company of Hidalgo's battalion occupied a precipice on the right rear of the army in order to guard the water. In an hour and a quarter all the men were in position and the general advance began with the first light of dawn. The army wheeled slightly to the right, pivoting on the artillery. The Italian forces moved east, guided in their march by the dark outline of a conical hill with a tukul on the summit. A little after 6am, the two leading battalions had some of their companies deployed, and the rest under good cover.

== Battle ==
As the sun rose, Captain di Cola's battery opened fire with shrapnel shells from a height at 1,900 meters from the enemy camp. Baratieri and staff, with the banner of Italy, occupied the high conical hill. The irregulars on the wing, seeking high ground, moved too far towards the center of the line, leaving almost unguarded on their left the height and village of Adu Auei. General Baratieri describes his surprise attack:

A great commotion is visible in the hostile camp. Notwithstanding the sudden surprise, rapidly increasing groups of warriors swarm out with great promptitude and dash, advancing through the winding paths and small gorges, crossing them with wonderful agility, concealing their numbers, shielding themselves with their obstacles. They offer us only a small mark as they disappear from time to time, and gather in greater numbers under the cover of the defenses.

The rifle fire runs along the whole line of the 3rd and 4th battalions, which keep well under the control of their officers in spite of the elan of the attack; as is proved by the frequent volleys, and the bayonet charges of individual units, on that broken, furrowed, and thickly covered ground.

As Baratieri observed the battle raging in front of Mengesha's camp, he noticed a large cloud of dust forming on his left. Soon the irregulars sent reports that they were under heavy attack.

After the initial Italian assault, the Tigrayans attempted to turn the Italian left flank, and Galliano's battalion was ordered to turn to the north. He took heavy losses, as his men mistook the Tigrayans for retreating irregulars and he was nearly surrounded. The Italian reserves under Hildago filled the gap, however, and drove back the Tigrayans. As the Italians gained ground through rushes and bayonet charges the artillery was brought up to within 1100 meters of the front. At that point in the battle, the left flank became critical. Mengesha himself was overseeing his troops as they tried to cut the Italians off from the highlands and town of Coatit. Baratieri ordered Toselli and Hildago to retire from their successful foray on the right and move towards the town. The artillery, then Toselli and Hildago moved rapidly in succession. Baratieri's headquarters were barely able to escape the hill, and three of his staff of eight were killed. The change in front was successfully executed anyway, the Italians then found themselves in a strong defensive position.

== Aftermath ==
The battle seemed to be a draw. The small Italian force had surprised the Tigrayans, but their attack had been repulsed. The Italians however had survived the counterattack and were now in a strong defensive position. After two days of probing attacks, the Tigrayans retired west towards Senafe, with Baratieri in hot pursuit. The Italian forces caught up to the Tigrayans by late afternoon as they encamped. Mengesha's tent was identified and the artillery brought up. Baratieri opened fire, but mist and the darkness of night quickly enveloped the battlefield. Mengesha and his forces were able to slip away, abandoning everything. On the 18th, Baratieri returned northwards, leaving garrisons in Senafe and Segheneyti, and ordering the occupation of the strong positions of Hadish-Adi and Adi-Keih, as the Tigrayans retreated westward to regroup.

Major Galliano was awarded the silver medal of valor. He was also made Knight of the Order of Saints Maurice and Lazarus, a royal order of merit of the House of Savoy.
