= Battle of Amba Alagi (1895) =

1895 battle of the First Italo-Ethiopian War

Coordinates: 12°59′39″N 39°30′13″E

- Part of the First Italo-Ethiopian War
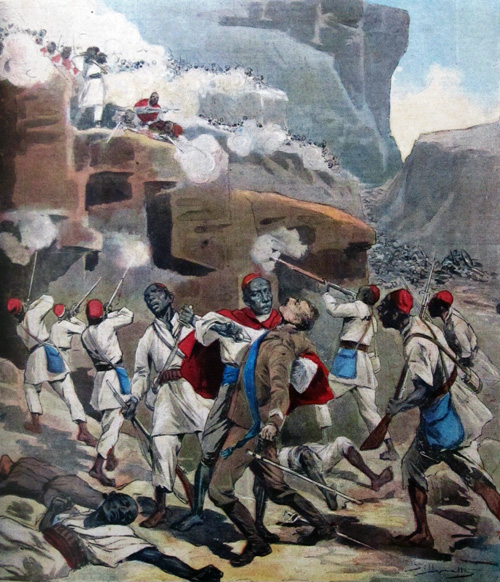
- Illustration of the death of Pietro Toselli in the L'Illustrazione Italiana
Date	7 December 1895
Location	Amba Alagi, Ethiopia
Result	Ethiopian victory

Belligerents
Italy	Ethiopia

Commanders and leaders
(Kingdom of Italy) Pietro Toselli † (Kingdom of Italy) Sebhat Aregawi	(Ethiopian Empire) Ras Makonnen (Ethiopian Empire) Ras Oliè (Ethiopian Empire) Mangesha Yohannes

Strength
2,350	30,000

Casualties and losses
1,539 killed 303 wounded	276 killed 349 wounded

The Battle of Amba Alagi was the first in a series of battles between the Italian General Baratieri and Ethiopia's Emperor Menelik during the First Italo-Ethiopian War. Amba Alagi was one of Baratieri's forward positions; it was under the command of Major Toselli with 2,000 Eritrean Askari. On 7 December 1895, the Ras Makonnen, Ras Oliè, and Ras Mengesha Yohannes commanded an assault of Menelik's vanguard that annihilated the Italians and killed Major Toselli.

== Battle ==
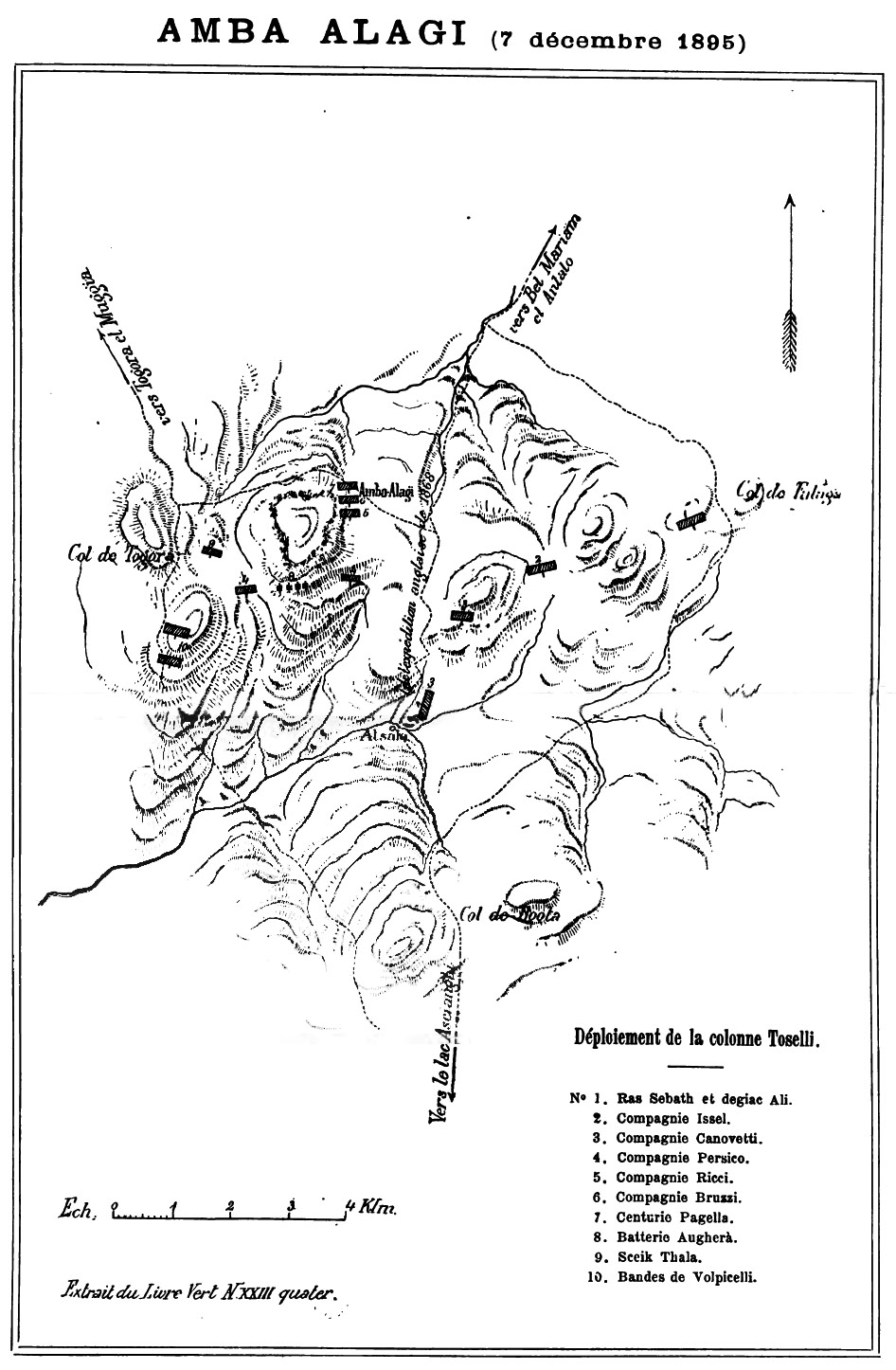
Positions of the Italians on Amba Alagi

Anticipating a battle the following day, on the evening of 6 December, Major Toselli deployed his troops to defend the southern slopes of the Amba. On the left flank, the irregular band of Ras Sebhat Aregawi were positioned to defend the Falgà Pass, supported by Captain Adriano Issel's company of Eritrean Ascaris. Further forward, in the direction of Atzalà, Captain Canovetti's company was deployed to defend the Alangi Pass. In the centre, on a clearing southwest of the Amba's summit, Toselli stationed the artillery battery and Captain Persico's company, with the companies of Captains Domenico Ricci and Carlo Bruzzi Alieti held in reserve behind them. On the right flank, the irregular band of Sheik Thala and Lieutenant Volpicelli were placed to defend Togorà Hill.

The battle began at 6:30 a.m. on 7 December, when an Ethiopian column launched a frontal attack against Canovetti's company. The assault was repelled with heavy losses. Shortly afterward, another Ethiopian column led by Ras Oliè executed a flanking manoeuvre and struck Ras Sebhat Aregawi's band near the Falgà Pass, forcing it to fall back on Issel's Askari company. Issel's position, reinforced by Canovetti's troops, who had rushed to its support, came under repeated attacks from large enemy contingents but managed to hold. Around 9:00 a.m., Toselli dispatched Ricci's Askari company to reinforce the left wing; it arrived just in time to repel another assault led by the forces of Ras Mekonnen and Ras Mikael.

At approximately 10:00 a.m., the Ethiopians committed the bulk of their forces. The contingents of Ras Alula Engida and Ras Mengesha attacked the Italian right flank, while the troops of Ras Mekonnen and Ras Mikael struck the centre. Ras Oliè's forces renewed their assault on the Italian left. Pressed on three sides, Toselli ordered the troops on the left wing to withdraw to the edge of the Amba at 12:30 p.m., while preparations were made for a general retreat across Togorà Hill. The baggage train was placed under the protection of a company commanded by Lieutenant Pagella.

At 12:40 p.m., Toselli ordered a phased withdrawal covered by Lieutenant Carlo Bruzzi Alieti's company. However, the Ethiopian forces, vastly superior in number, soon surged onto the plateau before the Amba's summit and overwhelmed Bruzzi Alieti's troops. When the resistance of the irregular bands on the right flank also collapsed, the retreat degenerated into a disorderly rout, and the Italian force was effectively destroyed. Major Toselli, leading the retreating column alongside Captains Canovetti, Persico, and Angherà, was killed by Ethiopian troops near the church of Endà Medàni Alem (also known as Bet Mariàm). Toselli's contingent was almost completely annihilated, suffering the loss of 19 officers, 20 Italian non-commissioned officers and soldiers, and approximately 2,000 Askaris and irregular troops.

The few survivors, now under the command of Lieutenants Pagella and Bodrero, reached the village of Adrerà at approximately 4:30 p.m. There they encountered a column of 1,500 Italian Askaris led by General Giuseppe Arimondi, who had departed from Mekelle on the evening of 6 December to support Toselli's planned withdrawal. After gathering the survivors, Arimondi's force, itself under Ethiopian attack, retreated toward Mekelle, arriving at dawn the following day.
