= Battle of Korem =

1909 battle in the Ethiopian Empire

Date	9 October 1909
Location	Wofla plain, near Korem and Lake Ashenge, Ethiopian Empire
Result	Victory for Abate Bwayalew and forces loyal to the imperial government

Belligerents
Forces of Abraha Araya	Forces of Abate Bwayalew; Imperial government supporters and allied northern contingents

Commanders and leaders
Däggazmač Abraha Araya; Qäññazmač Kembelhatu †	Wagshum Abate Bwayalew; Ras Sebhat Aregawi; Tigray Mekonnen Aberra Tessema; Däggazmač Tessema of Korem

Strength
c. 4,000	c. 6,000

Casualties and losses
Heavy; estimates vary	Heavy; estimates vary

The Battle of Korem was fought on 9 October 1909 on the Wäfla plain near Korem and Lake Ashenge, in the southern part of Tigray Province in the Ethiopian Empire. It pitted the forces of the Tigrayan nobleman Däggazmač Abraha Araya against those of Wagshum Abate Bwayalew, whom Emperor Menelik II had appointed overlord of Tigray, Wag and Lasta.

The confrontation arose from Abraha's refusal to accept Abate's authority over Tigray. Although the struggle reflected tensions between the imperial government and members of the Tigrayan provincial aristocracy, it did not divide neatly along regional lines. Several important Tigrayan nobles, notably Ras Sebhat Aregawi, supported Abate, while Ras Welle Betul and his son Ras Gugsa Welle cooperated with the government and sent reinforcements to Abate.

After a surprise attack by Abraha at dawn, several hours of fighting ended with the intervention of allied contingents on his flanks and rear. Abraha's army was routed and he was wounded and captured. His defeat temporarily secured Abate's position in northern Ethiopia and significantly altered the balance of power among the Tigrayan nobility.

== Background ==
Abraha Araya belonged to the ruling aristocracy of Tigray and was the son of Ras Araya Dimtsu. After studying public administration in Italy, he returned to Ethiopia following the Battle of Adwa in 1896. In July 1902 the imperial government appointed him governor of much of eastern and southern Tigray, including Enderta, Tembien, Kilte Awla'lo and Raya Azebo, then also known as Enda Makoni.

Abraha initially remained loyal to Menelik's government and took part in suppressing rival Tigrayan nobles. His authority was nevertheless challenged by other members of the regional aristocracy, particularly Seyoum Mengesha, a descendant of Emperor Yohannes IV. Menelik subsequently transferred Kilte Awla'lo and Tembien from Abraha to Seyoum, reducing the extent of Abraha's jurisdiction.

Abate Bwayalew, by contrast, was a nobleman from Wollo who had been raised at Menelik's court. He had distinguished himself during the Adwa campaign as a fighter, tactician and artillery officer and later governed Kembata. In 1909 he was appointed governor of Wag and Lasta with the title of Wagshum and was given authority over much of northern Ethiopia. The Encyclopaedia Aethiopica notes that, as an outsider, his overlordship was resented by local notables.

Abraha protested the extension of Abate's authority over Tigray and eventually refused to recognize him as his superior. According to Harold G. Marcus, Abate's appointment also formed part of the political realignment occurring during the final years of Menelik's reign, when the emperor's declining health had intensified rivalry among the principal regional and court factions.

== Prelude ==
Abraha presented his campaign as opposition to Abate rather than a rebellion against Menelik himself. Marcus records that, when Menelik reaffirmed his right to appoint Abate as governor, Abraha nevertheless continued his resistance. Däggazmač Gebre Selassie of Adwa and Ras Sebhat Aregawi declined to support him, while Welle Betul and Gugsa Welle cooperated with the government and sent men to reinforce Abate.

A contemporary Italian military report estimated Abraha's field force at approximately 4,000 riflemen, armed principally with Gras and Wetterli rifles and supported by a Gardner machine gun. Ammunition was limited, reportedly to around fifteen to twenty cartridges per rifleman.

Abate initially had nearly 4,000 men, two machine guns and one cannon. As reinforcements arrived, the same report estimated his strength on the battlefield at approximately 6,000. These included around 1,500 men from Wag under Däggazmač Tessema of Korem, approximately 500 men under Fitawrari Abuye, several hundred followers of Ras Sebhat, and several hundred men commanded by Təgre Mäkwännən Aberra Tessema.

Aberra Tessema had previously been in conflict with Abraha over the governorship of Enda Mehoni. According to the Italian account, Sebhat secured Aberra's cooperation with Abate by promising him authority over Enda Mehoni and Woggerat. Aberra commanded approximately 500 local fighters familiar with the southern Tigrayan terrain.

Ras Welle Betul also advanced towards Korem with his forces and sent an advance contingent of approximately 500 men under Fitawrari Abuye. Marcus independently states that both Welle and his son Gugsa sent reinforcements to Abate, and judged Welle's assistance important to the eventual victory.

During the advance south, fighting already occurred before the decisive engagement. On 1 and 2 October, a force commanded by Fitawrari Desta, one of Abraha's subordinate officers, clashed near Amba Alagi with Aberra Tessema. Aberra escaped despite being surrounded and subsequently harassed Abraha's rear elements. Two days later, his men attacked a group of stragglers and killed their commander, Däggazmač Kassa.

Abate reached Korem on 4 October and prepared a defensive position on the Wäfla plain. The Italian report describes a long low earth-and-stone breastwork across the expected direction of attack, with an additional stone position protecting the reserves and artillery. The plain was surrounded by higher ground, while the settlement of Korem lay to the east.

Seyoum Mengesha also moved south from Tembien while declaring his intention to assist Abate, but advanced slowly. The Italian report portrays his conduct as deliberately cautious, allowing him to avoid committing himself until the outcome of the confrontation was clearer. He did not reach Korem until after the battle.

== Battle ==
On 8 October the opposing camps were only a few kilometres apart. Abate attempted negotiations, offering to intercede with Menelik on Abraha's behalf. The Italian report states that the imperial court simultaneously warned Abate that Abraha might use the negotiations as cover for a night attack.

During the night of 8–9 October, Abraha left his tents standing in order to conceal his movement and marched around the western side of Abate's position. At approximately 5:00 a.m. his army emerged behind Abate's camp. Aberra Tessema, however, had observed the manoeuvre and reached Abate around midnight to warn him of the impending attack.

At dawn Abraha began his assault. A small detachment of his troops had occupied the nearby village of Ausseba, situated on slightly elevated ground behind Abate's original position. The firing from the rear initially surprised Abate, who had expected an attack from the opposite direction. He rapidly reversed his front and attacked the village, eventually taking it after heavy fighting. His cannon and a machine gun were then positioned there and directed against Abraha's troops.

Abraha's first units initially drove back elements of Abate's force. However, part of Abraha's army reached the baggage area of the opposing camp and began looting the tents. According to the Italian account, this disrupted the momentum of the surprise attack and gave Abate time to consolidate his position around Ausseba.

The engagement then developed into confused close-range fighting lasting several hours. Among Abraha's most important commanders was Qäññazmač Kembelhatu, his representative and military commander in the Mekelle area. The contemporary Italian report renders his name as "Cambelatù". Already wounded, Kembelhatu continued to encourage his troops at close range until he was shot and killed.

At the same time, Aberra Tessema pressed Abraha's left flank. Däggazmač Tessema of Korem advanced with the men of Wag and Ras Sebhat's forces occupied the eastern slopes, bringing pressure against Abraha's right flank.

Abraha's men gradually began to run short of ammunition. Unable to replenish their supplies and faced with the increasing strength of Abate's coalition, they attempted to withdraw eastwards in the direction of Korem. During the withdrawal, Grazmač Dogo appeared south of the road to Marto with approximately 400–500 soldiers belonging to Ras Welle Betul and attacked Abraha's force from the rear.

The retreat then became a rout. Groups of Azebo Oromo who had remained outside the principal engagement attacked a number of the fleeing soldiers as they moved towards the south-east. According to the Italian report, the main battle was over by approximately 10:00 a.m.

== Casualties and capture of Abraha ==
Estimates of the losses vary considerably between sources. Marcus states that Abraha lost approximately 300 men while Abate suffered around 1,000 casualties. The 1910 Italian military report gives substantially higher figures, claiming around 600 of Abraha's men killed on the battlefield, another 200–300 killed during the retreat, and approximately 800 taken prisoner. It attributed about 1,000 deaths to Abate's own force, in addition to losses among the contingents of Welle, Sebhat and Wag, and reported a further 700–800 wounded.

Hagos G/Yohannes Hadera, citing Corrado Zoli, gives another estimate of approximately 2,000 dead and 1,000 wounded on the two sides combined. The Encyclopaedia Aethiopica does not provide precise totals, stating only that many were killed and thousands wounded.

Hadera records that several members of Abraha's immediate circle were killed, including Kembelhatu and two of Abraha's brothers, Däggazmač Tafari Araya, governor of Saharti, and Däggazmač Redda Araya, governor of Dedeba.

The sources also differ slightly over the circumstances and timing of Abraha's capture. The contemporary Italian account states that he was captured on the battlefield after the rout on 9 October, while Marcus records that he was wounded and captured following his defeat. Hadera places his capture later and attributes it specifically to Ras Sebhat Aregawi.

== Aftermath ==
Abraha and a number of his leading followers were transferred south towards Addis Ababa. The Italian report states that they were handed over to Ras Welle Betul on 15 October, while ordinary soldiers taken prisoner were released on Menelik's orders.

Marcus states that Abraha and approximately twenty-five of his lieutenants were tried in Addis Ababa on 10 November. Abraha was sentenced to death, but the sentence was subsequently commuted to imprisonment. The Encyclopaedia Aethiopica likewise records his detention following the defeat and his eventual release in 1911.

Abate's victory consolidated his authority in the immediate aftermath of the campaign. In 1910 he was granted the title of ras by Menelik's plenipotentiary regent. His dominance was short-lived, however, as the continuing succession struggle surrounding the incapacitated Menelik rapidly altered the political alliances at court.

Abraha returned to favour under Lij Iyasu, who released him and appointed him to an important position at the imperial court. Abate, by contrast, was later imprisoned. Following Iyasu's deposition in 1916, Abraha was again detained in Addis Ababa, where he died in 1917 according to the Encyclopaedia Aethiopica.

The battle also affected the balance among Tigray's aristocratic houses. Hadera argues that following Abraha's defeat, Seyoum Mengesha and Gugsa Araya Selassie emerged as two of the principal Tigrayan rulers operating under the central government.

The composition of the opposing armies also illustrates the divided character of Tigrayan politics during the period. Abraha was a member of the Tigrayan ruling aristocracy, but prominent Tigrayan figures such as Sebhat Aregawi and Aberra Tessema fought on Abate's side. Welle Betul and Gugsa Welle, themselves members of the northern aristocracy, also assisted Abate by providing reinforcements.

== Date of the battle ==
Sources are not entirely consistent concerning the date. The entries for "Koräm" and "Abatä Bwayaläw" in the Encyclopaedia Aethiopica place the battle in September 1909, while the encyclopedia's entry on Abraha Araya places it in October. Marcus states that Abraha was isolated near Lake Ashenge on 8 October and defeated the following day, while the contemporary Italian military report explicitly dates the decisive battle to 9 October 1909.

== See also ==
- Abraha Araya
- Abate Bwayalew
- Sebhat Aregawi
- Welle Betul
- Gugsa Welle
- Seyoum Mengesha
- Korem
- Lake Ashenge
- Tigray Province
