= Abraha Araya =

Ethiopian nobleman, governor and minister (1873–1917)

Dejazmach Abraha Araya

Minister of Interior
- In office 1911–1917

Governor of eastern and southern Tigray
- In office July 1902 – 1909

Personal details
- Born: 1873
- Died: 1917 (aged 43–44) Addis Ababa, Ethiopian Empire
- Resting place: Bä'ala Wäld Church, Addis Ababa; remains later transferred to Mekelle
- Parent: Ras Araya Dimtsu (father)
- Relatives: Dabbab Araya (brother)

Däggazmač Abraha Araya (Tigrinya: አብርሃ አራያ, romanized: ʾAbrǝha ʾAraya); also rendered as Abreha Araya; 1873–1917) was an Ethiopian nobleman, provincial governor, military commander and government minister from Tigray. He belonged to the ruling aristocracy of Tigray and was a relative of Emperor Yohannes IV.

In 1902, Emperor Menelik II appointed Abraha governor of much of eastern and southern Tigray, initially including Enderta, Tembien, Kilte Awla'lo and Raya Azebo, the latter also known at the time as Enda Makoni. He was closely associated with the development of Mekelle, where he constructed the residence known as Abraha Castle and sponsored other urban and religious developments.

Abraha initially supported Menelik's central government against rival Tigrayan chiefs, but in 1909 rebelled against the appointment of Abate Bwayalew as overlord of Tigray. He was defeated, wounded and captured at the Battle of Korem and subsequently imprisoned in Addis Ababa. Released in 1911 after the rise of Lij Iyasu, he returned to prominence at the imperial court and served as Ethiopia's Minister of Interior from 1911 to 1917.

== Early life and education ==
Abraha was born in 1873, the son of Ras Araya Dimtsu the Elder. Hagos G/Yohannes Hadera identifies his father as the governor of Enderta during the reign of Yohannes IV, as well as the emperor's maternal uncle and one of his chief councillors. Historian Haggai Erlich likewise identifies Abraha as a son of Ras Araya Dimtsu and notes that he was the brother of Dabbab Araya.

In 1888, Abraha was sent to Italy, where he studied public administration. He returned to Ethiopia immediately after the Ethiopian victory at the Battle of Adwa in 1896. According to the Encyclopaedia Aethiopica, his education and his descent from Tigray's ruling family attracted the attention of the imperial government.

== Governor in Tigray ==
Following the departure of Ras Welle Betul from Tigray in 1902, Menelik II divided much of the province among local Tigrayan rulers. In July 1902, north-western Tigray, including Adwa, Aksum and Shire, was assigned to Dejazmach Gebre Selassie Barya-Gaber, while Agame was placed under Shum Agame Desta. Abraha received a large territory in central, eastern and southern Tigray comprising Enderta, Tembien, Kilte Awla'lo and Raya Azebo, the latter then also known as Enda Makoni.

The appointment brought Abraha into conflict with Seyoum Mengesha and Gugsa Araya Selassie, descendants of Yohannes IV who regarded some of the territories assigned to Abraha as belonging to their traditional sphere of power. In September 1902, Seyoum and Gugsa marched against Mekelle in an attempt to dislodge him. The opposing forces fought for three days at Addi-Shum Dehun, on the outskirts of Mekelle, before Abraha defeated Seyum and Gugsa and forced them to retreat towards Tembien.

Abraha continued to support Menelik's government between 1902 and 1906 and participated in efforts to suppress the rebellions of Seyoum Mengesha and Gugsa Araya. His territorial jurisdiction, however, did not remain unchanged throughout the period. Following Seyum's submission to the imperial authorities, Menelik II granted Seyum Kilte Awla'lo and subsequently Tembien and Abergele, taking the first two from Abraha. Abraha was consequently left principally with Enderta and Enda Makoni.

Following the death of Ras Mengesha Yohannes in 1906, Abraha became one of several major Tigrayan nobles competing for influence over the central government and for the overlordship of Tigray. His principal rivals included Seyum Mengesha, Gugsa Araya Selassie, Ras Sebhat Aregawi and Gebre Selassie Barya-Gaber.

== Administration and development of Mekelle ==
Abraha made Mekelle an important centre of his administration. The Encyclopaedia Aethiopica credits his government with reforms that contributed to giving the town a more modern urban character. He constructed a prominent palace, later known as Abraha Castle, and established butcheries, liquor houses, churches and market centres. Erlich similarly identifies Abraha as the builder of the well-known palace at Mekelle.

A study by Mekelle University's Department of Heritage Conservation and Management also attributes a wider programme of architectural patronage to Abraha. It identifies the En'da Selassie Church, constructed in 1901, as one of his earliest commissions and describes the Feleg Dae'ro Palace, built in 1904, as another of his residences.

== Cow's tail tax and opposition ==
At the beginning of 1907, Abraha introduced a special tax known as the Cow's tail (Tigrinya: ጭራ ላሕሚ, romanized: Čeralahmi. The levy was imposed on cattle ownership. According to oral testimony recorded by Hagos G/Yohannes, a farmer who owned a single cow was required to pay one thaler. Some of the sources consulted by Hagos associated the new taxation with Abraha's ambitious construction programme in Mekelle, including the financing of Abraha Castle.

The levy encountered substantial resistance. Inhabitants of Agame and Kilte Awla'lo refused to pay, and Abraha severely punished the inhabitants of Asebi-Derra in Kilte Awla'lo for their opposition. The incident angered the central government. According to an informant cited by Hagos, Menelik subsequently punished Abraha by requiring him to pay approximately 80,000 thalers.

The dispute weakened Abraha's position. His associates in Enderta reportedly feared that the emperor might remove him from his governorship, while Hagos records oral poetry encouraging Abraha to resist the possibility of dismissal.

== Conflict with Abate Bwayalew ==
During the political uncertainty surrounding Menelik's declining health, the emperor carried out a final reorganization of provincial offices. In April 1909, Wagshum Abate Bwayalew was appointed governor-general, or overlord, of Tigray. Abraha, Gebre Selassie Barya-Gaber and Ras Sebhat Aregawi were consequently placed beneath Abate's authority.

Abraha objected to the appointment. He sent a group of elders to the imperial palace to petition Menelik to reconsider the decision, but the request was rejected. According to Hagos, the appointment of an overlord above Abraha was partly connected to Menelik's displeasure with Abraha's treatment of the inhabitants of Asebi-Derra.

Abraha subsequently left Addis Ababa, ostensibly to prepare a reception for Abate, but returned to Mekelle and rejected the new governor-general's authority. In early October 1909, he marched south from Mekelle towards Korem to confront Abate's approaching army.

According to Corrado Zoli, as cited by Hagos, Abraha claimed after Ras Mengesha's death that his kinship with Yohannes IV gave him a legitimate claim to the emperor's political inheritance. He also objected strongly to the subordination of Tigray to a ruler bearing the title of Wagshum, arguing that Wag should instead fall under Tigrayan authority.

== Battle of Korem ==
The Battle of Korem began on the morning of 7 October 1909. Although opposition to Abate's appointment existed among other Tigrayan nobles, most declined to join Abraha's rebellion. His forces also suffered from limited popular support in Enderta, which Hagos partly attributes to resentment over the Čeralahmi tax.

Ras Sebhat Aregawi actively supported Abate, while Abate's soldiers were equipped with modern weapons. Hagos cites Harold G. Marcus as identifying Dejazmach Desta, son of Wagshum Guangul, as one of the few notable figures who supported Abraha.

The fighting was severe. Hagos cites Corrado Zoli as estimating that approximately 2,000 people were killed and another 1,000 wounded on the two sides. A number of Abraha's close relatives and leading followers were killed, including Qäñazmač Kembelhatu, Abraha's representative, military commander and governor of Mekelle and its surroundings. Two of Abraha's brothers also died in the battle: Dejazmach Tafari Araya, governor of Saharti, and Dejazmach Redda Araya, governor of Dedeba.

Late on 10 October, Abraha was slightly wounded and captured by Ras Sebhat. He was sent to Addis Ababa and sentenced to life imprisonment. His territories were subsequently redistributed, with Seyum Mengesha receiving Enderta in addition to Tembien and Abergele.

The defeat substantially altered the balance of power among the Tigrayan nobility. Hagos argues that after Korem the principal local rulers to emerge under the central government were Seyum Mengesha and Gugsa Araya Selassie.

== Release and Minister of the Interior ==
Abraha's life sentence was subsequently commuted, and he was released towards the end of 1911 as Lij Iyasu's political authority increased. Hagos describes Abraha as Iyasu's brother-in-law. His former opponent Abate Bwayalew, by contrast, was imprisoned.

The Encyclopaedia Aethiopica states that Abraha won Iyasu's favour and was appointed an important official at the imperial court. A Mekelle University study identifies his position more specifically as Minister of the Interior, which it states he held from 1911 to 1917.

Following the deposition of Iyasu in 1916, Abraha was again placed in custody in Addis Ababa.

== Death and burial ==
Sources differ concerning the precise date of Abraha's death. The Encyclopaedia Aethiopica gives 1917 and states that he died in custody in Addis Ababa. The Mekelle University architectural study likewise gives his lifespan as 1872–1917. Hagos G/Yohannes, however, gives the specific date 16 May 1918, despite elsewhere in the same study referring to Abraha as having lived from 1873 to 1917.

According to the Encyclopaedia Aethiopica, Abraha was originally buried at Bä'ala Wäld Church in Addis Ababa, now situated within the grounds of Holy Trinity Cathedral. His remains were later transferred to Mekelle by his descendants.

== Legacy ==
Abraha is particularly associated with the early twentieth-century development of Mekelle. His best-known surviving architectural association is Abraha Castle, which was named after him and later used as a hotel. His building programme and establishment of new commercial and religious institutions formed part of the expansion of Mekelle during the period in which the town was developing as one of Tigray's principal political and commercial centres.

His political career also reflected the wider struggle between Tigray's hereditary provincial aristocracy and the central government during the final years of Menelik II's reign. Initially one of the central government's principal Tigrayan appointees, Abraha eventually challenged the appointment of a non-Tigrayan overlord in 1909, before returning to central government service under Iyasu after his release.

== See also ==
- Battle of Korem
- Enderta Province
- Tembien
- Raya Azebo
- Mekelle
- Yohannes IV
- Iyasu V
