= Araya Dimtsu =

Ras Araya Selassie Dimtsu
- አርአያ ሥላሴ ድምጹ
- Drawing of Araya Dimtsu published in 1869
- Born: c. 1810; Enderta, Tigray, Ethiopian Empire
- Died: 1889 near the Atbarah River, Mahdist Sudan
- Occupations: Nobleman, military commander and provincial governor
- Children: Abraha Araya; Amlasu Araya; Dabbab Araya
- Father: Dejazmach Dimtsu Debbab
- Relatives: Yohannes IV (maternal nephew); Sabagadis Woldu (maternal uncle)

Ras Araya Selassie Dimtsu (Tigrinya: አርአያ ሥላሴ ድምጹ, romanized: Arʾaya Śəllase Dəmṣu; also known as Araya Dimtsu or Araya Demtsu; c. 1810–1889) was an Ethiopian nobleman, military commander and provincial governor from Enderta in Tigray. A maternal uncle of Emperor Yohannes IV, he was a prominent figure in the political struggles of northern Ethiopia during the Zemene Mesafint and later served in senior commands under both Tewodros II and Yohannes IV.

== Family and background ==
Araya was born around 1810 into the hereditary aristocracy of Enderta. His father was Dejazmach Dimtsu Debbab, son of Debbab, the younger brother of the powerful Tigrayan ruler Wolde Selassie. As such, Araya was therefore Wolde Selassie's grandnephew. A nineteenth-century account also identifies his mother as a sister of Sabagadis Woldu, making Araya a nephew of Sabagadis.

His sister Amate Selassie Dimtsu was the mother of Emperor Yohannes IV, making Araya his maternal uncle.

Later accounts differ concerning Araya's exact birthplace. Some identify Egrihariba in Enderta as his birthplace, while local traditions associate him with Chelekot, another important settlement of Enderta.

== Struggle for Tigray ==
Following the death of Dejazmach Sabagadis Woldu at the battle of May Islami in Shire in 1829, Araya aspired to establish himself as ruler of Tigray. His ambitions were initially frustrated by Dejazmach Wube Haile Maryam, who incorporated Tigray into a larger political domain together with Semien, Sällämt, Wägära, Welkait and Sägäde.

At this stage of his career Araya held the title of Bäʿalgada. The office was associated with the supervision of the salt trade through Tigray and consequently carried considerable economic and political importance. His correspondence from 1842 bears a lion seal reading "Bal Gada Araya", and Sven Rubenson identifies the title as that of the comptroller of the salt trade through Tigray. Araya was subsequently elevated to Dejazmach and eventually to Ras.

During the early 1840s Araya emerged as one of Wube's principal opponents in Tigray. Taking advantage of Wube's absence from the region during his campaign against Ras Ali, Araya attempted to rally the Tigrayan population behind his own claim and temporarily seized control of the provincial government.

His assumption of power is directly documented in contemporary correspondence. On 20 July 1842, Araya addressed a letter to Alexandre Degoutin, the French consular agent at Massawa, announcing that he had taken possession of Tigray and presenting himself as the successor of Ras Wolde Selassie in its government. The letter was written on his behalf by the German scholar and long-term resident of Ethiopia Wilhelm Schimper.

Rubenson notes that Araya's descent from the old ruling family of Enderta strengthened his claim to legitimacy among Tigrayans in comparison with Wube, who originated from Semien. Araya also sought foreign recognition for his position through his correspondence with the French authorities at Massawa.

His success was temporary. Wube eventually reasserted his authority in Tigray and defeated Araya's rebellion. Araya was subsequently imprisoned for approximately fifteen years.

Araya's rebellion has also been discussed in the wider context of shefta politics in nineteenth-century northern Ethiopia. Historian Richard Caulk used his career as an early example of the close relationship between rebellion and legitimate political office, noting that individuals who operated as shefta could later receive formal appointments within the political system.

== Under Tewodros II ==
Following the defeat of Wube and the rise of Emperor Tewodros II, Araya was released from imprisonment in 1855 and entrusted with the government or command of Tigray.

Sources differ over the duration of this appointment. Some later biographical accounts give Araya's tenure as Governor of Tigray from 1855 to 1863, followed by imprisonment at Maqdala from 1863 to 1868. Earlier and academic accounts, however, indicate a substantially shorter governorship. Clements Markham wrote in 1869 that Tewodros replaced Araya after only a few months, while the Encyclopaedia Aethiopica similarly states that Araya was soon imprisoned again.

He was subsequently confined at Maqdala, where he remained until the fortress was captured by the British Expedition to Abyssinia in 1868. Araya was among those freed following the fall of Maqdala and the death of Tewodros II.

== Service under Yohannes IV ==
After his release, Araya became closely associated with his nephew Kassa Mercha, who defeated Tekle Giyorgis II in 1871 and was subsequently crowned Emperor Yohannes IV. Under Yohannes, Araya held a succession of important provincial commands. The Encyclopaedia Aethiopica records him as governor successively of Enderta, Akele Guzai and Dembiya.

Some later accounts describe Araya as Chief Crown Councillor to Yohannes IV from 1868 until 1889 and as one of the emperor's senior political advisers. The Encyclopaedia Aethiopica uses the more general description that he "held high commands" under his nephew.

Araya remained an influential member of the northern aristocracy throughout Yohannes's reign. His position also connected him to the rise of one of the emperor's most important generals, Ras Alula. Alula initially served as an aškär, or retainer, at Araya's court before entering the service of Araya's nephew Kassa Mercha after Araya's imprisonment by Tewodros.

Haggai Erlich similarly describes Araya as the hereditary chief of Enderta and the lord of the land cultivated by Alula's family, explaining the young Alula's initial attachment to his household.

== Family and connections with Ras Alula ==
Araya's political relationship with Ras Alula later developed into a family alliance. Around the late 1870s, Alula married Araya's daughter Amlasu Araya. The marriage linked the general to one of the established aristocratic families of Tigray.

Another of Araya's children was Dabbab Araya, who later emerged as a regional political and military figure and became one of Ras Alula's principal personal rivals.

Through his family, Araya therefore occupied an important position within the political network surrounding Yohannes IV: he was the emperor's maternal uncle, the early patron and later father-in-law of Ras Alula, and a member of the old ruling family of Enderta.

== Death ==
In 1889 Araya, despite being nearly eighty years old, accompanied Yohannes IV during the war against the Mahdist State. Yohannes was mortally wounded during the Battle of Metemma in March 1889.

After the emperor's death, a group of his followers attempted to carry his body back towards Tigray. Mahdist forces overtook the party near the Atbarah River. Araya remained with the emperor's body and was killed fighting when the Mahdists seized it, approximately two days after the battle.

A more detailed account was later recorded by the British traveller Augustus B. Wylde, who stated that he received his information from a priest who had survived the encounter. According to Wylde, after exhausting his ammunition Araya continued to defend the emperor's body with his shield and sword until he was killed by a Mahdist warrior.

Later accounts give his death as 11 March 1889.

== Legacy ==
Araya's career spanned the final decades of the Zemene Mesafint, the restoration of centralized imperial authority under Tewodros II, and the reign of Yohannes IV. His career illustrates the changing relationship between hereditary provincial aristocracy, rebellion and imperial appointment in nineteenth-century northern Ethiopia.

A drawing of Araya, captioned Balgadda Arya, was published in the French geographical magazine Le Tour du Monde in 1869. The image was drawn by the French artist Alphonse-Marie-Adolphe de Neuville and is now in the public domain.
