= Araya Selassie Yohannes =

Ethiopian army commander and governor (1869/70–1888)

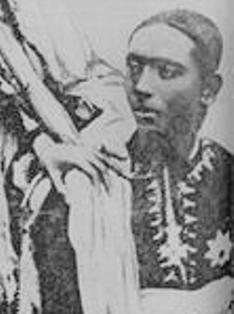
- Cropped image of Arya Selassie

King of Tigray (disputed)
- Reign: 1882–1888
- Predecessor: Yohannes IV
- Successor: Gugsa Araya Selassie
- Born: 1869/70; Enderta, Tigray, Ethiopia
- Died: 10 June 1888; Mekelle, Tigray, Ethiopia
- Burial: Medhane Alem Church, Mekelle
- Spouse: Leult Zewditu; Emet Negest Sendek
- Issue: Gugsa Araya Selassie
- House: House of Solomon (Tigrayan Branch)
- Father: Emperor Yohannes IV
- Religion: Ethiopian Orthodox Tewahedo

Ras Araya Selassie Yohannes (Tigrinya: አርአያ ስላሴ ዮሓንስ araya səllase yohannəs; "horse name" Abba Deblaq) (1869/70 – 10 June 1888) was a son of Emperor Yohannes IV from his wife Masitire Selassie, a daughter of a Muslim Afar chieftain whom he married after she was Christened. Araya was nominated Crown Prince.

Araya was the first husband of Zewditu (later Empress), the daughter of atse Menelik II, having married her in January 1883. He was given the command of Wollo province at the time of his wedding. Because of a revolt raised in Wollo due to the death of dejazmach Amda Sadiq, chief of Tekaledere, in a quarrel with Araya's followers, Yohannes IV decided to appoint ras Mikael Ali, the traditional claimant to the lordship of Wollo. Ras Araya was transferred to Begemder and Dembaya in May 1886. In 1887–88, when the country was facing the Italian threat, he was commander of 40,000 troops near Adwa.

Araya died in his youth from smallpox, when the Emperor was returning from a campaign against the Italians at Seati. His only son, by a weyzero Negesit, a lady from Wollo, was leul ras Gugsa Araya.

== Biography ==
=== Early life ===
Leul (Note: Roughly equivalent to Prince.) Araya Selassie Yohannes was born in Enderta, a part of Tigray in Ethiopia in 1869/70, the legitimate son of Emperor Yohannes IV of Ethiopia. Mengesha Yohannes was his illegitimate half brother. He was granted the title of Ras in 1872 and was the governor of Enderta from 1872 to 1882.

=== Rise to Power ===
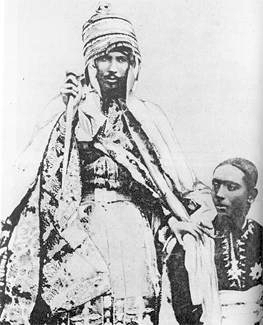
Araya Selassie Yohannes (right) with his father, Emporer Yohannes IV (left).

On 24 October 1882, the fifteen-year-old Leul Araya Selassie Yohannes married six-year-old Leult (Note: Roughly equivalent to Princess.) Zewditu, eldest daughter of Negus (Note: Roughly equivalent to King.) Menelik of Shewa. The marriage was political, having been arranged when Menelik agreed to submit to Yohannes' rule. In 1882 Ras Araya was granted the title of Negus of Tigray and Wollo. In 1883, Araya Selassie Yohannes was made Shum (Note: Roughly equivalent to Governor.) of Wollo Province and, in 1886, he was made Shum of Begemder and Dembiya.

In 1885, Araya Selassie Yohannes fathered a son, Gugsa Araya Selassie. The mother's identity is unknown.

=== Death ===
On 10 June 1888, while in Mek'ele gathering an army for his father, Araya Selassie Yohannes died of smallpox. He was buried at Medhane Alem Church.

== Honors ==
Grand Collar of the Order of the Seal of Solomon (1875)

== Legacy ==
Familial rivalry between the two lines of descent from Emperor Yohannes IV proved to be a difficult issue for Emperor Menelik II and his successors. Tigray Province was divided between Ras Gugsa Araya Selassie, the son of Ras Araya Selassie Yohannes, and Ras Seyum Mangasha, the son of Ras Mangasha Yohannes. Gugsa Araya Selassie ruled the eastern half of Tigray and Seyum Mangasha ruled the western half.

== See also ==
- Monarchies of Ethiopia
- Ethiopian aristocratic and court titles
- Mangasha Yohannes - Half brother of Araya Selassie Yohannes

== Notes ==
Footnotes

Citations
