= Yeshashework Yilma =

Member of the Ethiopian imperial family

Princess Yeshashework Yilma (died 1982) was the daughter of Dejazmatch Yilma Makonnen, governor of Harar and niece of Emperor Haile Selassie of Ethiopia. Her mother Woizero Aselefech Wolde Hanna was the niece of Empress Taitu Bitul, consort of Emperor Menelik II of Ethiopia. Through her paternal great-grandmother, she was a member of the Imperial Solomonic dynasty of Ethiopia. Her father died while she was still very young.

Yeshashework was raised in the Imperial Palace nursery alongside other children of royal blood during the reign of Menelik II, such as Lij Iyasu. Shortly after her uncle Ras Taffari Makonnen became Crown Prince and Regent of Ethiopia in 1917, Yeshashwork was given in marriage to the much older Leul Ras Gugsa Araya Selassie, Prince of Eastern Tigray, and grandson of Emperor Yohannes IV. As the wife of Leul Ras Gugsa, she was given the title of "Leult" (Princess) by Empress Zauditu, with the dignity of "Her Highness". Ras Gugsa died not long afterwards, and the widowed Princess returned to Addis Ababa from Mekele. In 1930, her uncle became Emperor Haile Selassie, and she was granted the title of Princess in her own right with the dignity of "Her Imperial Highness" as the daughter of his elder brother. Princess Yeshashework's second husband, Bitwoded Makonnen Demissew, perished at Amba Aradam while fighting the Italian invasion of 1936.

The Princess accompanied the rest of the Imperial family into exile, living primarily in Jerusalem until 1941. After the restoration, Princess Yeshashework married Ras Bitwoded Makonnen Endelkachew, head of the powerful aristocratic Adisge clan. He was a veteran of the war and a fellow former exile, who became the first Prime Minister of Ethiopia. It was an unarranged love match, a rarity at that time in Ethiopian aristocratic marriages.

Widowed for a third and final time in 1963, the Princess spent some time in seclusion in the Holy Land, and returned to take up some state duties as a member of the Imperial family, accompanying the Emperor on some foreign trips, and being part of the royal party at state functions inside the country as well. Along with other senior royal women, she often acted as an official hostess for her uncle the Emperor. She was arrested upon the seizure of power by the Derg regime 11 September 1974, and was imprisoned with the other women of the Imperial family. The Princess suffered poor health while in prison, but along with the other women was denied medical care. She died a few months after her release from prison in 1982 and was buried at the church at her former estate at Reppi, just south of Addis Ababa.
