= Aregawi Subagadis =

Aregawi Sabagadis አረጋዊ ሱባጋዲስ
- Dejazmach

Governor of Agame
- Reign: 1831–1859
- Predecessor: Sabagadis Woldu
- Successor: Sebhat Aregawi
- Born: Adigrat, Agame, Ethiopia
- Died: 1860
- Issue: Ras Sebhat Aregawi; Dejazmatch Desta Aragawi; Dejazmatch Wolde Gabriel Aragawi; Lij Asgadem Aragawi; Dejazmatch Abbaya Aragawi; Woizero Shoanesh
- House: House of Agame
- Father: Dejazmach Sabagadis Woldu
- Mother: Woizero Desta

Aregawi Sabagadis (Tigrinya: አረገዊ ሱባጋዲስ, arägawi subagadis; d.1860) was a dejazmach (governor) of Agame from 1831 to 1859. Aregawi gained some fame in the 1840-50s for rebelling a number of times against dejazmach Wube Haile Mariam. Making Adigrat his capital, he ruled Agame and the surrounding areas by 1818. Aregawi opposed Catholic missionaries activities in Tigray. However, by the end of his rule, he developed diplomatic relations with the French consul in Massawa. Aregawi was the son of dejazmach Sabagadis Woldu and was the father of ras Sebhat Aregawi.
