= Welle Betul =

Ethiopian military commander (died 1918)

Welle Betul (died June 1918) also known as Wale Betul, Wolie Betul and Wele Bitul (cited as Ras Oliè in Italian sources), was an Ethiopian military commander under Emperor Menelik II, the ruler of Begemder and Yejju, and the younger brother of Empress Taytu Betul.

== Biography ==
Welle Betul's was the eldest son of Ras Betul Haile Maryam, the provincial governor of Semien. The father of Ras Wele was half-brother to Wube Haile Maryam who had conquered Tigray in 1831, invading it from his ancestral province of Semien, and had ruled it until 1855. Welle and his brother Alula, first enter the historical record when they became prisoners of Emperor Tewodros II at Amba Mariam in about 1857. It was there that they became acquainted with the young prince of Shewa, Menelik II, who was also held captive in the fortress.

During the British expedition to Abyssinia, Wele escaped his detention at Amba Mariam and fled to Shewa. In 1876 Menelik appointed Wele as governor of Yejju, angering Yohannes IV, but Wele managed to remain loyal to Menelik without coming into open conflict with Emperor Yohannes. In 1883, Welle's sister Taytu Betul married Menelik. Wele must have promoted Taytu's marriage to the Shewan king, though in the recollection of one of Menelik's foreign retainers, it was her sister, Desta, who attracted Menelik's attention first. "But when he saw Taytu, Menelik complained to Wele, 'Why didn’t you show me the prettier one first?'"

In 1889, when Menelik became emperor he gave Welle the title of Ras and expanded his domain to include Begemder, a vast increase. He was thus handed the problem of Ras Zewde, a local rebel whose reputation for rough justice was causing anxiety to the crown. Rumors had reached the capital that Ras Zewde was hanging more people for stealing food than there were people dying of hunger. In a letter to the Emperor, Zewde declared he would kill Ras Wele. The threat angered Empress Taytu who was outraged on behalf of her brother, when Zewde employed verb forms that were used for servants and children. As the chronicles state; "He dared to humiliate Ras Wele whose father had been lord over [Zewde's] grandparents, forefathers and who himself was superior to Zewde." The people of Begemder were then subjected to armies of Ras Wele who hunted Zewde and his men for six months before capturing him. Zewde spent 15 years in prison, a sentence brought on, it was said, by Empress Taytu's hatred of him.

Ras Welle served in the First Italo-Ethiopian War, fighting at the Battle of Amba Alagi, the Battle of Mekelle and the Battle of Adwa. In 1897, the British journalist Augustus B. Wylde wrote after meeting Ras Welle: Wale's house, "the best I have seen in Abyssinia," was furnished with a couch and two chairs of Austrian bent wood. "We dined with knives, forks and spoons, which he knew how to use." Wele confided to Wylde that Yejju was difficult to govern, and that he had been forced to execute many people to keep his province in line. Still, said Wylde, "He is popular and taxes a little over 10 per cent."

Mengesha Yohannes's rebellion in 1898 ended with his capture and captivity in February 1899. Despite the removal of Mengesha Yohannes from Tigray, the area remained unstable. In June 1900 it began to quiet down when Ras Wele replaced Ras Makonnen as governor of Tigray. Ferdinando Martini was astonished at Wele's success, as he had predicted that "no one will submit to Wele," and that "Mekonnen was not liked because no Shewan is loved in Tigray, but Wele is haughty, proud, violent and ... Tigray will be in constant ferment." Two months after taking over, Wele had received the submissions of most important Tigray chiefs. He had also expelled the Catholic missionaries from Agame, and prevented the Protestant Swedish mission from crossing Tigray to distribute their newly printed Oromo Bible in the southwest. Martini commented on Ras Wele, claiming that he "drinks a lot" and annoyed Martini because he could not remember his name despite all the correspondence that had passed between them when Wele was governor of Tigray. "He does not have much head ... but is good with the poor who love him very much," explained Abreha Araya.

The most important political marriage of 1900 was that of Welle's son, Gugsa Welle, to Menelik's daughter, Zewditu. It was Zewditu's fourth and final marriage at the age of about 27. Gugsa Wele was promoted to Ras and made governor of Begemder upon this marriage.

When Taytu was forced from power, and a regency under Ras Tessema Nadew took over in 1910, Welle rebelled, fighting government troops from June to November, when he decided to surrender. He lived under detention until he died in June 1918, a few months after his sister.
