= Welwalo Adigrat University FC =

Association football club in Ethiopia

Welwalo Adigrat University
- Full name: Welwalo Adigrat University Football Club
- Nickname: Beecha nigusochu / ብጫ ንጉሶቹ (The Yellow Kings)
- Founded: 1948
- Ground: Wolwalo Stadium; Adigrat, Ethiopia
- Capacity: 10,000
- Manager: Yohannes Sahle
- League: Ethiopian Premier League
- 2025–26: 16th
Home colours	Away colours

Welwalo Adigrat University Football Club (Amharic: ወልዋሎ ዓዲግራት ዩኒቨርሲቲ ስፖርት ክለብ) is an Ethiopian professional football club based in Adigrat. They play in the Ethiopian Premier League, the top division of Ethiopian football.

== History ==
Welwalo Adigrat University FC was founded in 1948 as Wolwalo FC and participated in different Ethiopian league ranks. Wolwalo was promoted to the Ethiopian Premier League for the first time after the end of the 2016–17 season. Welwalo Adigrat is funded as part of Adigrat University, a public institution.

They began as the official football team of Adigrat University, called Welwalo, competing in gold and black colors. The Welwalo initially participated in Group A of the second tier of Ethiopian football, before being promoted to the Ethiopian Premier League.

=== Ethiopian Premier League ===
After a slow start to the season, the team sacked their manager Berhane GebreEgziabher. Tsegaye Kidanemariam was hired in his place. In a match versus Fasil Kenema, Welwalo goalkeeper Zewedu Mesfin gained much attention for an infamous play in which he accidentally threw the ball into his own net. The own goal ended being the deciding factor in the match, with Welwalo dropping points in 1–0 scoreline. On April 30, 2018, the club was involved in an altercation during a game against Defense Force SC. that ultimately led to a member of the Welwalo coaching staff physically attacking the referee. Although all involved avoided serious injury after altercation the incident prompted the Ethiopian Football Federation to suspend the entire league upon further review of the situation, calling for an emergency meeting for the following Thursday.

== Grounds ==
Welwalo Adigrat University FC plays its home games at Adigrat Stadium in the city of Adigrat in the northern Tigray Region of Ethiopia. Notably the field they play on was grass-less during their inaugural 2017–18 Ethiopian Premier League season. In August 2018, it was announced that Adigrat Stadium would undergo renovations, including a new grass field as well as new stands.

== Derby ==
The club plays in the Tigray derby with fellow Tigray Region club Mekelle 70 Enderta FC.

== Former managers ==
- (Ethiopia) Berhane GebreEgziabher
- (Ethiopia) Tsegaye Kidanemariam
- (Ethiopia) Yohannes Sahle
