= Gugsa Araya Selassie =

Ethiopian army commander (1885–1932)

- Dejazmach of Ethiopia
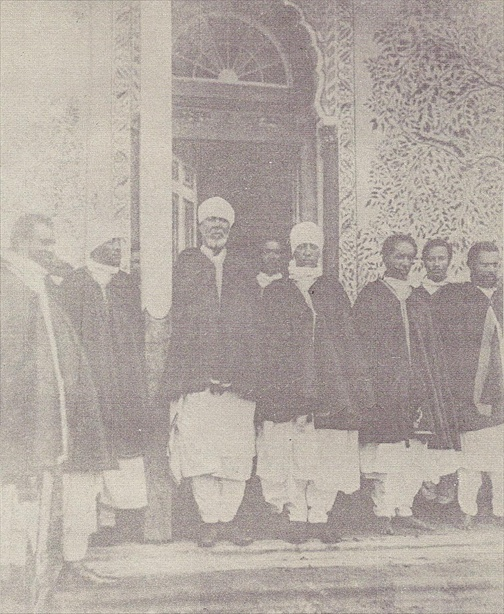

Shum of Eastern Tigray
- Reign: 1888-1932
- Predecessor: Araya Selassie Yohannes
- Successor: Haile Selassie Gugsa
- Born: 1885; Enderta, Tigray, Ethiopia
- Died: April 28, 1932 (aged 46–47)
- Spouse: Yeshashework Yilma; Zimam Birru
- Issue: Kifletsion Gugsa; Haile Selassie Gugsa
- House: House of Solomon (Tigrayan Branch)
- Father: Araya Selassie Yohannes
- Religion: Ethiopian Orthodox Tewahedo

Gugsa Araya Selassie (1885 – 28 April 1932) was an army commander and a member of the royal family of the Ethiopian Empire.

== Biography ==
Leul (Note: Roughly equivalent to Prince.) Gugsa Araya Selassie was the legitimate son of Ras (Note: Roughly equivalent to Duke.) Araya Selassie Yohannes. Araya Selassie Yohannes was the legitimate son of Emperor Yohannes IV of Ethiopia.

In 1917, Gugsa Araya Selassie married Leult (Note: Roughly equivalent to Princess.) Yeshashework Yilma, the niece of Ras Tafari Makonnen. On 2 November 1930, Tafari Makonnen was crowned as Emperor Haile Selassie.

Gugsa Araya Selassie had a son Kifletsion Gugsa by his second wife Woizero Zimam Birru, daughter of Degiat Birru. After Ras Gugsa died Woizero Zimam Birru married Degiat Zegeye Hailu.

On 11 January 1921, Gugsa Araya Selassie captured Lij (Note: Roughly equivalent to Child.) Iyasu. Iyasu was then delivered by him into the custody of Ras Kassa Haile Darge. While sometimes referred to as "Emperor Iyasu V," Iyasu was never formally crowned Emperor of Ethiopia. In 1916, Iyasu was deposed after forces loyal to him were defeated in the Battle of Segale. Iyasu was replaced by his aunt, Empress Zewditu I. 40-year-old Zewditu named as her Enderase, or Regent, the then 24-year-old Ras Tafari Makonnen. Iyasu and a small band of followers roamed the Afar Depression for five years after his being deposed before falling into the hands of Gugsa Araya Selassie.

Gugsa Araya Selassie was a Ras and Shum (Note: Roughly equivalent to Governor.) of eastern Tigray Province. Towards the end of 1928, Negus Tafari called for Ras Gugsa Araya Selassie and the governors of several other provinces to suppress an Oromo revolt in Wollo. Like many of those approached by Tafari, his response was not enthusiastic. Being a traditionalist, Gugsa Araya Selassie was not happy about the rise of Tafari. He was approached by Ras Gugsa Welle concerning an uprising against Tafari. But, after initially indicating support, he did not respond to a letter from Gugsa Welle. When Gugsa Welle openly revolted, Gugsa Araya Selassie did not support him.

By 1932, Gugsa Araya Selassie's health deteriorated and he fell ill. Haile Selassie authorized a trip to Switzerland for medical help. Had Gugsa Araya Selassie traveled in a stretcher, he may have made it. But tradition dictated that a Ras travel by war mule and this is what he did. He averaged about one hour of travel per day. His doctor insisted that he should stop traveling in this manner, but tradition won out and he died. (Note: According to Haile Selassie's biography, Gugsa Aray Selassie died in 1933.)

On 28 April 1932, according to legend, the corpse of Ras Gugsa Araya Selassie entered Adigrat strapped upright on his war mule. Upon his death, his son, Haile Selassie Gugsa, moved into his father's Italian-built palace in Mek'ele and replaced him as Shum of eastern Tigray. Dejazmatch (Note: Roughly equivalent to Commander of the Gate.)

== See also ==
- Monarchies of Ethiopia
- Ethiopian aristocratic and court titles
- Battle of Anchem

== Notes ==
Footnotes

Citations
