= Adigrat University =

National university in Adigrat, Tigray Region, Ethiopia

- ዓዲግራት ዩኒቨርስቲ
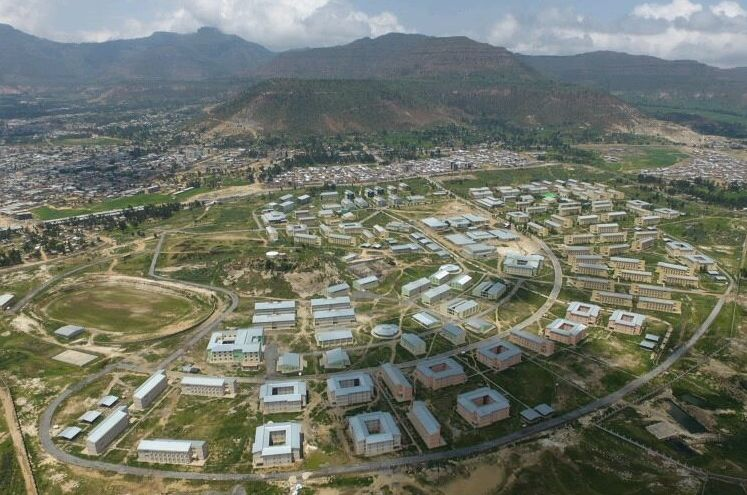
- Aerial view of campus
- Motto in English: Hard Work: Our Hallmark!
- Type: National
- Established: 2011
- President: Dr. Zaid Negash
- Vice-president: Dr. Alem Mebrahtu
- Academic staff: 1500
- Students: 14,000+ (2013/14)
- Location: Adigrat, Tigray Region, Ethiopia; 14.257°N 39.465°E
- Campus: 2
- Language: English
- Colours
- Sporting affiliations: Welwalo Adigrat University
- Website: www.adu.edu.et

- Location within Ethiopia

Adigrat University (Tigrinya: ዓዲግራት ዩኒቨርሲቲ) is a residential national university in Adigrat, Tigray Region, Ethiopia. It is approximately 900 kilometres (560 mi) north of Addis Ababa, Ethiopia. The Ministry of Education admits qualified students to Adigrat University based on their score on the Ethiopian Higher Education Entrance Examination (EHEEE). Facilities at the university's campuses were "completely destroyed" during the Tigray War.

== History ==
The main reason for the establishment of Adigrat University is said to have been initiated by Prime Minister Meles Zenawi during a visit to the town and a discussion with the town elders. The cornerstone for Adigrat University was laid in December 2008. The university was officially established via a government proclamation (Council of Ministers decree 223/2003) on May 26, 2011. In July 2011, the university opened with 4 colleges and 13 departments with 960 students.

During the Tigray War in late 2020 and early 2021, the facilities and properties of Adigrat University were "completely destroyed", according to Alula Habteab, head of the Bureau of Construction, Road and Transport in the Transitional Government of Tigray.

== Academics ==
Adigrat University has two campuses Bati Genahti Campus and Agame Campus.

=== Colleges ===
- College of Engineering and Technology
- College of Medicine and Health Science
- College of Social Sciences and Humanities
- College of Business and Economics
- College of Natural and Computational Sciences
- College of Agriculture and Environmental Sciences

=== Library system ===
Adigrat University's library system has archives, reading rooms, and research centers. The university administration has embarked of capacity building by investing in a media and communications department, cloud computing and telecom equipment, and digital library services.

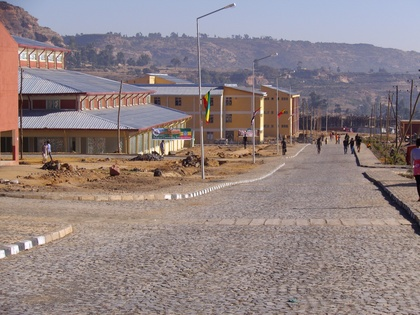
Bati Genahti Campus

== Athletics ==
The Adigrat University's association football team is called Welwalo, with colors gold and black. Welwalo participates in the Ethiopian Premier League. The Welwalo men's football team plays home games at the Adigrat stadium.

== See also ==
- List of universities and colleges in Ethiopia
- Education in Ethiopia
