= Agame =

Former province in northern Ethiopia

Agame (Tigrinya: ዓጋመ, lit. 'fruitful') is a province in northern Ethiopia. It includes the northeastern corner of Tigray, borders the Eritrean province of Akele Guzai in the north, Tembien, Kalatta Awlalo and Enderta in the south, and the Afar lowlands in the east. This province of Agame consists of the famous Debre Dammo monastery and the city of Adigrat. In pre-1991, Agame had a total area of about 4,889 square kilometres (1,888 mi^{2}) with an estimated population of 344,800.

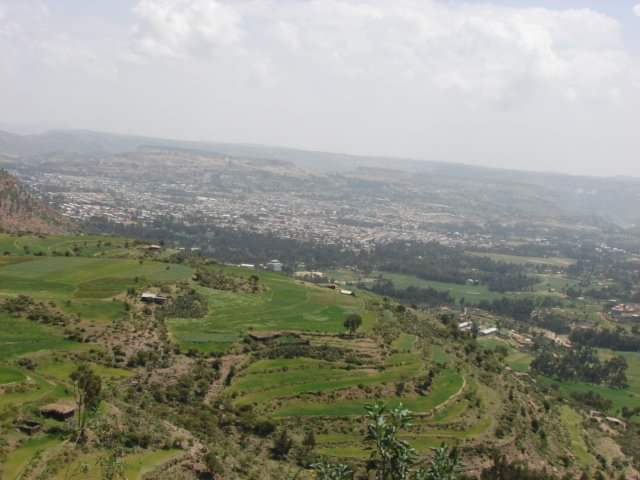
Tigray, Agame province, a skyline of Adigrat city surroundings

== History ==
=== 980 BC – 940 AD ===
Agame is one of the oldest regions of Ethiopia, being part of the Kingdom of D'mt in northern Ethiopia and Eritrea that would develop into the Kingdom of Aksum. It was a main center of Aksumite culture (second only to Central Tigray, where the capital was located), with a distinct sub-culture that separated the two regions from that of Central Tigray (Axum, Adwa, & Yeha), Central Eritrea (Seraye, Hamasien, Akele Guzai and Adulis), and frontier areas in northern Eritrea. Agame is one of the very few place-names identified in the Adulis inscription as early as the 3rd century. It is mentioned there as an apparently viable local political entity and it seems that it continued as such from then onwards. The area also appears to have been part of the eastern cultural province of ancient Aksum: to this period dates back the foundation of the monastery of Debre Damo, which played a major role in Ethiopia's ecclesiastic history throughout the Middle Ages up to the modern times.

=== 11th century – 18th century ===
The chiefs of Agame would assume the title of Shum Agame (Ge'ez: ሹም ዓጋመ) in medieval times and throughout history. Even though in the 16th century the Shum Agame submitted to Ahmad Ibrahim al-Gazi's army, the physical inaccessibility of lowland Agame suited the purpose of providing safe hideouts to various political, religious and social dissidents. It remained the centre of prominent monasteries such as Gunda Gunde Maryam, which was established by the Stephanites (Abba Estifanos of Gwendagwende) during the 15th century. Agame was mentioned in the 16th century charter written during the reign of Emperor Lebna Dengel. During medieval times, Agame was part of a larger province of Bur in Ethiopia, which also included some northeastern Afar lowlands, and the Buri Peninsula; Agame and Akkele Guzay were part of "Upper" (La'ilay) Bur, while the lowlands were further distinguished as "Lower" (Tahtay).

Agame appears on indigenous maps of the northern Horn of Africa in the 15th century.

=== 19th century ===
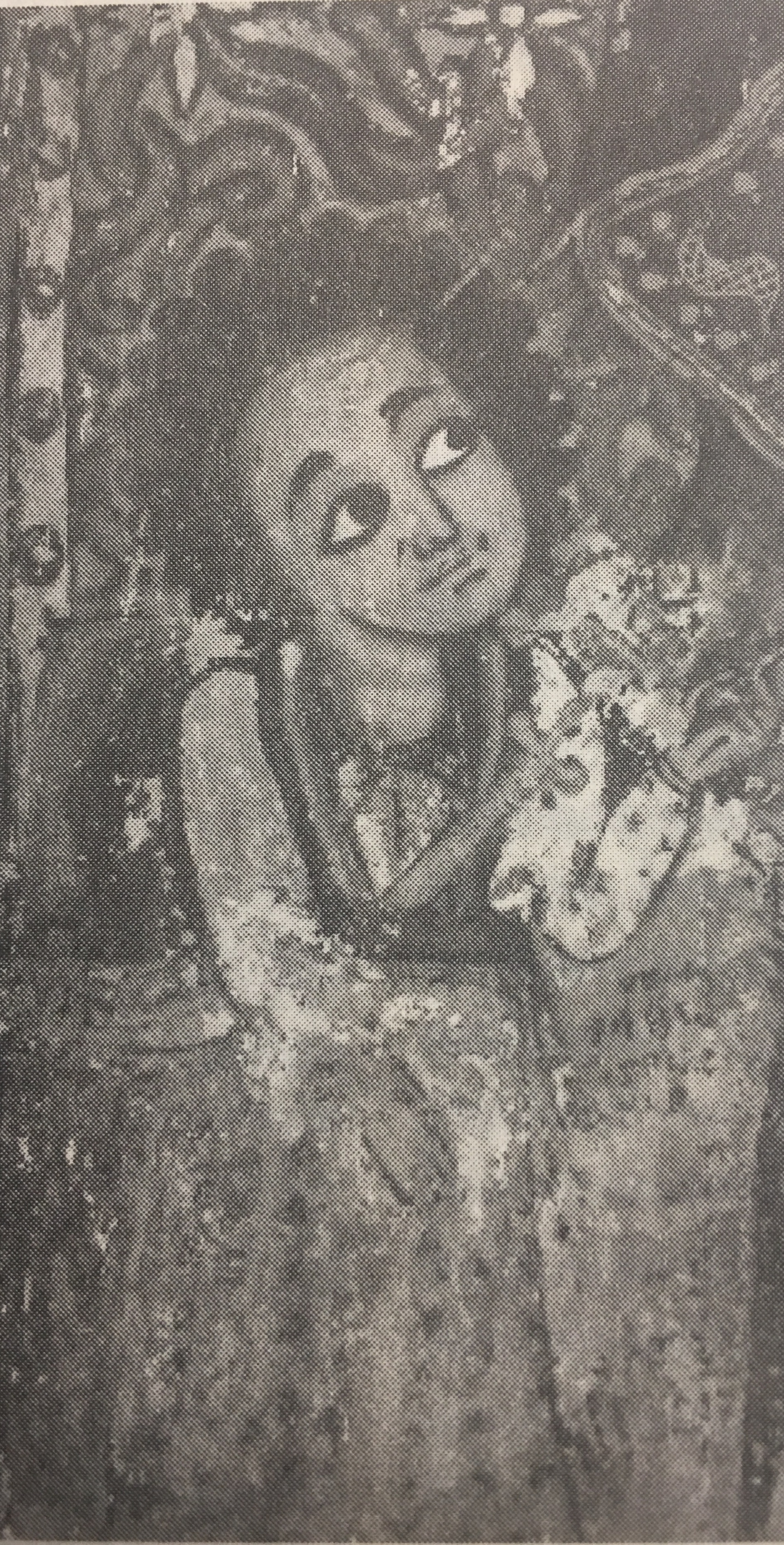
A portrait of Dejazmatch Sabagadis Woldu worshipping St. Mary, on the wall iconography at Gunda Gunde Church

Agame had a major role to play in the political ascendancy of Tigray in Christian Ethiopia during the greater part of the first quarter of the 19th century. One of the prominent warlords of northern Ethiopia, Dejazmatch Sabagadis Woldu, who ruled Tigray in the period 1822–31, had his power base in Agame. His demise at the Battle of Debre Abbay marked a decline in the political importance of Agame in the Tigrayan political arena.

=== 20th century ===
In the period 1896–1936, Agame was led by the descendants of Sabagadis. Dejazmatch Kassa Sebhat was the chief of the area during the Italian war 1935–36. He mobilized the people of Agame and engaged the Italians at the battle of Fagena, in the Afar escarpment east of Addigrat. But he was defeated and ultimately surrendered. During 1941–74 Agame existed as an awraja (in the province of Tigray), having five districts (woreda) under it: Gulo Makeda, Ganta Afshum, Subja Sase, Dallol and Kalatte Balaza. Descendants of the Sabagadis family still governed Agame until the revolution.

== Geography ==
Topographically, the Agame area exhibits diverse physical features: mountain massifs, plains, plateaux, deep gorges and river valleys. Archaeological evidence indicates that Agame was one of the earliest places in Ethiopia to adopt ploughshare agriculture, but centuries of over-cultivation and maximum utilization of resource turned the area into agriculturally marginal land.

== Demographics ==
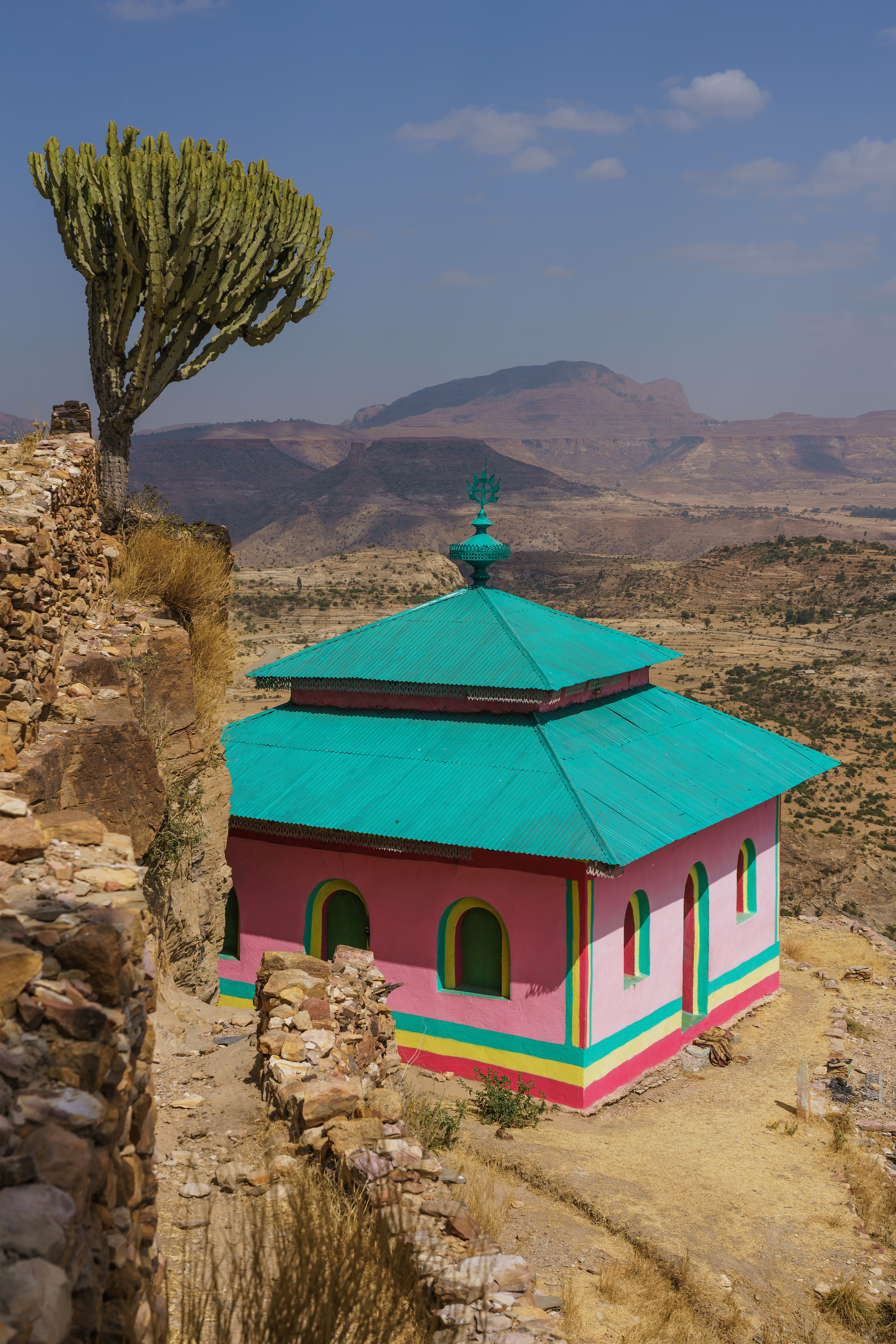
Abuna Aregawi House at Debre Damo Monastery

The principal inhabitants of Agame are Tigrayans with Afar & Saho minorities. The Afar-speaking population predominated in the lowlands. The north-eastern and south-eastern sector of the escarpment is principally inhabited by the Saho-speaking Irob and Afar-speakers respectively. Adigrat prevailed as the capital of Agame throughout the 19th and 20th centuries. Since the 19th century, Agame has been an enduring base for Lazarist Catholic evangelization in northern Ethiopia. The legacies of this process are the Catholic Cathedral and the Seminary of Adigrat and the considerable Catholic congregation of Irob-land in the lowlands.

== Government ==
The local noble family had ruled over Agame from the "Era of the Princes" until the Derg deposed Emperor Haile Selassie in 1974. This family retained sufficient power and respect following the Italian conquest in 1936, that the Italian Viceroy Pietro Badoglio proposed in a telegram to Benito Mussolini that some of the old Ethiopian ruling class be co-opted into Italian East Africa: "In the region between Shoa and Eritrea, there were local noble families which it was not convenient to slight because they had exercised command for generations and have authority and prestige which can be valuable for us."

=== House of Agame ===
Ethiopian records traces the origins of this family to the marriage of King Margedir of Rome and Eleni, sister of King Solomon. The current lineage of the rulers of Agame is as follows:

Shum Agame Kumalit
Shum Agame Woldu Kumalit r.1802–1815	Woizero Sabana Giyorgis m.1802
Woizero Desta	Dejazmatch Sabagadis Woldu; 1770–1831 r.1818–1831	Fitawrari Gabru Gura	Shum Agame Agus	Shum Agame Sardie	Shum Agame Gabre Medhin	Shum Agame Wolde Tatios	Woizero Biritawit
Dejazmatch Kassa Sabagadis	Dejazmatch Wolde Mikael	Dejazmatch Hagos Sabagadis	Dejazmatch Aregawi Sabagadis r.1831–1859	Lij Be'algada Araya	Lij Hailu
Dejazmatch Desta Aragawi	Dejazmatch Wolde Gabriel Aragawi	Lij Asghedom Aragawi	Dejazmatch Abbaya Aragawi	Ras Sebhat Aregawi r.1892–1914	Woizero Shoanesh m.1892
Dejazmatch Asghedom Sebhat	Emebet (Abebech Sbhat)	Woizero Gereda Sebhat	Woizero Lemlem Sebhat	Woizero Hareya Sebhat	Woizero Semret Sebhat	Shum Agame Desta Sebhat −1914	Woizero Zenebech Sebhat	Ras Kassa Sebhat r.1914–1974	Dejazmatch Ayele Sebhat	Lij Gebrezgi Sebhat −1935
lij Abrha Tesfay
Woizero Frewoyini Abrha	Woizero Feleg Abrha	Ato Alem Abrha	Ato Gezae Abrha	Woizero WeleteMariam G/wahed
