= Zewditu =

Empress of Ethiopia from 1916 to 1930

Zewditu ዘውዲቱ
- Negesta Nagastat
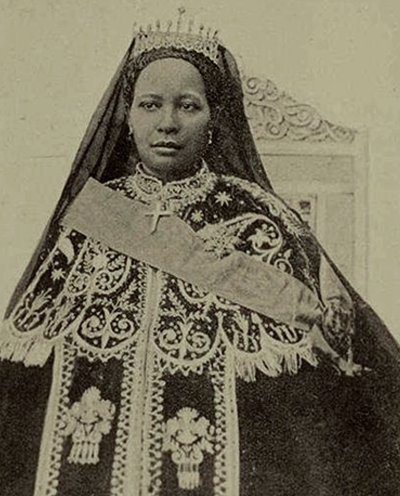
- Zewditu c. 1916–1930

Empress of Ethiopia
- Reign: 27 September 1916 – 2 April 1930
- Coronation: 11 February 1917
- Predecessor: Lij Iyasu
- Successor: Haile Selassie
- Regent: Ras Tafari Makonnen
- Born: Askala Maryam; 29 April 1876; Werrehimenu, Wollo, Ethiopian Empire
- Died: 2 April 1930 (aged 53); Addis Ababa, Ethiopian Empire
- Spouse: Araya Selassie Yohannes (1882–1888); Gwangul Zegeye; Wube Atnaf Seged; Gugsa Welle (1900–1930)
- House: Shewa
- Dynasty: Solomonic dynasty
- Father: Menelik II
- Mother: Weyziro Abechi
- Religion: Ethiopian Orthodox Tewahedo

Styles of Zewditu I of Ethiopia
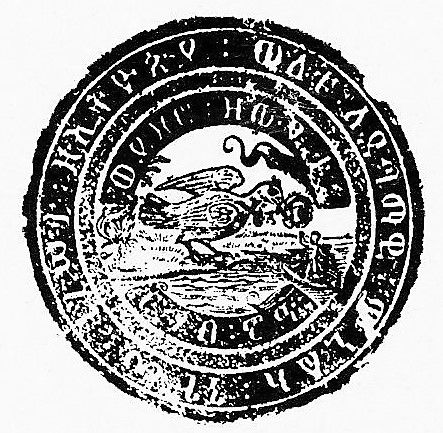
- Reference style: Her Imperial Majesty; Amharic: ግርማዊት; girmāwīt
- Spoken style: Your Imperial Majesty; Amharic: ጃንሆይ; djānhoi; lit. "O [esteemed] royal"
- Alternative style: Our Lord (familiar); Amharic: ጌቶቹ; getochu; lit. "Our master" (pl.)

Zewditu (Amharic: ዘውዲቱ, born Askala Maryam; 29 April 1876 – 2 April 1930) was Empress of Ethiopia from 1916 until her death in 1930. She officially adopted the regnal name "Zewditu" at the beginning of her reign, which was triggered by the dethroning of Lij Iyasu in 1916. Her coronation was held on February 11, 1917, in the Cathedral of St. George in Addis Ababa—a capital founded by her father. Forty years old and childless when crowned, she is the first and only empress regnant of the Ethiopian Empire. Described as the first modern female head of a nation in Africa, she was the last female Ethiopian head of state until the 2018 election of Sahle-Work Zewde as president. Her reign, which she is said to have closely patterned after the legacy of Queen Victoria of the United Kingdom, is noted for the reforms of her Regent and heir apparent Ras Tafari Makonnen (who succeeded her as Emperor Haile Selassie I) – changes which she was at best ambivalent and often stridently opposed to, due to her staunch conservatism and strong religiosity.

Empress Zewditu sought to maintain Ethiopia's traditional values during her reign through a series of conservative policies, resisting rapid modernization. Ascending to the throne in 1916 after the deposition of Lij Iyasu, she was supported by conservative factions and the Ethiopian Orthodox Church, who saw her as a stabilizing figure. Faced with significant internal challenges, she navigated power struggles between conservative and modernist factions within the country. Despite her conservative stance, Zewditu had to deal with the complexities of a nation under pressure to modernize and engage with foreign powers.

During her reign, Ethiopia experienced political manoeuvring, with Ras Tafari pushing for reforms and international diplomacy, creating a dual power dynamic that defined her rule. Ethiopia's attempts to assert its sovereignty amidst external threats, particularly from colonial powers like Italy, marked this period. Her commitment to preserving Ethiopian independence and cultural heritage was a notable aspect of her leadership. However, resistance to rapid modernization and reliance on traditionalist policies led to tensions within the government and society.

The death of Empress Zewditu in 1930, under circumstances still somewhat unclear, marked the end of an era and paved the way for Ras Tafari to succeed her as Emperor Haile Selassie I. Her legacy reflects efforts to maintain traditional values while facing the inevitability of change, and her personal dedication to the Ethiopian Orthodox faith and her role in a transitional period that set the stage for the modernization efforts that followed. Critics argue that her conservative policies may have hindered Ethiopia's progress and adaptation to the modern world. However, supporters highlight her significant role in maintaining Ethiopian sovereignty and cultural identity during a period of potential upheaval. Her reign remains a topic of study for its insights into the challenges of leadership during a time of significant political and social change.

== Biography ==
=== Early life ===
Baptised as Askala Maryam ("Askal of Mary", a type of flower), but using the given name Zewditu (Zauditu), the future Empress was the second daughter of the Negus (or King) Menelik of Shewa, the future emperor Menelik II. Zewditu is an Amharic word meaning "She is the Crown", though it sometimes appears erroneously Anglicized as "Judith", with which it is not cognate. Her mother, Weyziro (Lady) Abechi, was a noblewoman of Wollo and a brief companion of Menelik II. Her mother separated from Menelik when Zewditu was very young, and the future empress was raised by her father and his consort Baffana. Negus Menelik later married Taytu Betul but had no children by this wife. Menelik had three acknowledged children: Zewditu herself; a son, Asfa Wossen, who died before adulthood; and another daughter Shewa Regga, the mother of Lij Iyasu, Menelik's eventual heir. However, the Emperor remained closest to Zewditu, who also had good relations with her stepmother, the Empress Taytu, and was part of her father's household for most of her life.

In 1886 the ten-year-old Zewditu was married to Ras Araya Selassie Yohannes, son and heir of Emperor Yohannes IV. The marriage was political, having been arranged when Menelik agreed to submit to Yohannes' rule. Yohannes and Menelik eventually fell into conflict again, however, with Menelik launching a rebellion against Yohannes' rule. Zewditu's marriage was childless, since she was very young during her marriage, although her husband had fathered a son by another woman. When Araya Selassie died in 1888, she left Mekele and returned to her father's court in Shewa. Despite the hostility between Menelik and Yohannes, Zewditu managed throughout the conflict to maintain good relations with both. In a sign of his high regard and affection for his daughter-in-law, Emperor Yohannes IV sent Zewditu back to Shewa with a large gift of valuable cattle, at a time when relations between him and her father were at a particularly low point.

Zewditu had two further marriages, both brief, before marrying Ras Gugsa Welle. Gugsa Welle was the nephew of the Empress Taytu, Zewditu's stepmother. Zewditu had already been on good terms with Taytu, but the direct tie between the two helped cement the relationship. Unlike her prior marriages, Zewditu's marriage to Gugsa Welle is thought to have been happy.

=== Ascent to power ===
Upon the death of Emperor Yohannis IV at the Battle of Metemma against the Mahdists of the Sudan, in the Mahdist War, Negus Menelik of Shewa assumed power and became Emperor of Ethiopia in 1889. This restored the direct male line succession of the dynasty, as Emperor Yohannes's claim to the throne was through a female link to the line. As the daughter of Menelik II, Zewditu would be the last monarch in direct agnatic descent from the Solomonic dynasty. Her successor Haile Selassie was also linked in the female line. Menelik died in 1913, and Lij Iyasu, the son of Zewditu's half-sister Shewa Regga, who had been publicly declared heir apparent in 1909, took the throne. Iyasu considered Zewditu a potential threat to his rule, and exiled her and her husband to the countryside.

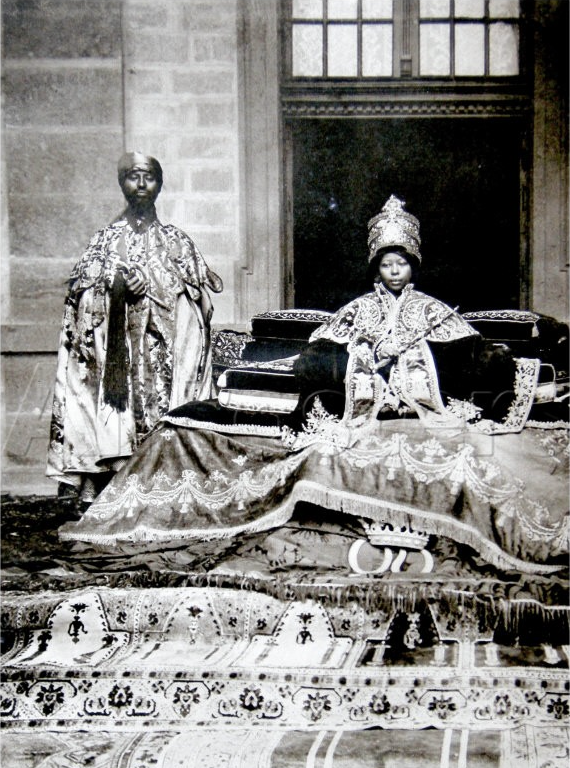
Empress Zewditu with one of her favored priests

Due to fears of instability that might be caused, the cabinet of ministers decided not to publicly proclaim the death of Menelik II. As a result, Iyasu was never officially proclaimed as Emperor Iyasu V. However, both Menelik's death and Iyasu's de facto accession were widely known and accepted. The Church authorities, the Lord Regent Ras Tessema, and the ministers agreed that Iyasu's coronation should be postponed until he was a bit older and had taken Holy Communion with his wife, which would make his marriage insoluble in the eyes of the Orthodox Church. However, Iyasu quickly encountered problems with his rule, and he was never crowned. He was widely disliked by the nobility for his unstable behavior, and the church held him in suspicion for his alleged Muslim sympathies. After a troubled few years, Iyasu was removed from power. Zewditu was summoned to the capital, and on 27 September 1916, the Council of State and the Ethiopian Orthodox Tewahedo Church officially announced the death of Emperor Menelik II and deposed Iyasu in favour of Zewditu. Zewditu's official title was "Queen of Kings" (Negiste Negest), a modification of the traditional title "King of Kings" (Nəgusä Nägäst).

Initially, Zewditu was not permitted to exercise power herself. Instead, her cousin Ras Tafari Makonnen was appointed regent, and her father's old loyal general, Fitawrari Hapte Giorgis Dinagde was made commander-in-chief of the army. Ras Tafari was also made heir apparent to Zewditu, for none of her children had survived to adulthood. In 1928, after an attempt to remove Ras Tafari Makonnen from power failed, the Empress was compelled to crown her cousin Negus.

=== Reign ===
==== Political maneuvering ====
While the conservative Ethiopian aristocracy was generally supportive of Zewditu, it was less enthusiastic about many of her relatives. Zewditu's stepmother and the aunt of her husband, Dowager Empress Taytu Betul, had withdrawn from the capital after Menelik's death, but were still distrusted somewhat due to the evident favoritism she had practiced during the reign of her late husband. In an attempt to limit her influence, the aristocracy arranged for her nephew – Zewditu's husband Ras Gugsa Welle – to be appointed to a remote governorship, removing him from court. This move, while intended as a strike against Taytu rather than against Zewditu, is believed to have upset Zewditu considerably. Zewditu also suffered guilt for taking the throne from Lij Iyasu, whom her father had wanted to succeed him – while she believed that Iyasu's overthrow was necessary, she had admired her father greatly, and was unhappy at having to disobey his wishes. Her separation from her husband and her guilt about Iyasu's overthrow combined to make Zewditu not particularly happy as Empress. Even though he had treated her abominably, she held much personal affection for her nephew Iyasu, and is said to have wept bitterly for him when told that she was being made Empress as her nephew had been excommunicated for apostasy. Increasingly, the Empress retreated from state responsibility into a world of fasting and prayer, whilst the progressive elements that surrounded the heir, Tafari Makonnen, gained in strength and influence at court.

==== War against Iyasu ====
The early period of Zewditu's reign was marked by a war against Lij Iyasu, who had escaped captivity. Backed by his father, Negus Mikael of Wollo, a powerful northern leader, Iyasu attempted to regain the throne. The two failed to effectively coordinate their efforts however, and after some initial victories Iyasu's father was defeated and captured at the Battle of Segale. The Negus was paraded through the streets of Addis Ababa in chains, carrying a rock of repentance on his shoulders, before entering the throne room and kissing the Empress's shoes to beg for her mercy. The heir to the throne, Ras Tafari Makonnen, was not present at this spectacle out of consideration for the feelings of his wife, who was the granddaughter of Negus Mikael.

Upon hearing of his father's defeat and humiliation, Iyasu himself fled to Afar. After years on the run, Iyasu was later captured by Dejazmach Gugsa Araya Selassie, the son whom Zewditu's first husband had fathered by another woman. Gugsa Araya was rewarded with the title of Ras from his former stepmother, and with Princess Yeshashework Yilma, the niece of Tafari Makonnen, as his bride. When Iyasu was captured, a tearful Empress Zewditu pleaded that he be kept in a special house on the grounds of the palace, where she would see to his care and he could receive religious counsel. She found Ras Tafari and Fitawrari Habte Giyorgis Dinagde to be unbendingly opposed, and so gave up. She did, however, ensure that special favorite foods and a constant supply of clothing and luxuries reached Iyasu at his place of arrest in Sellale.

==== Rise of Tafari ====
As Empress Zewditu's reign progressed, the difference in outlook gradually widened between her and her appointed heir, Ras Tafari Makonnen. Tafari was a moderniser, believing that Ethiopia needed to open itself to the world in order to survive. In this, he had the backing of many younger nobles. Zewditu, however, was a conservative, believing in the preservation of Ethiopian tradition. She had the strong backing of the church in this belief. Slowly, however, Zewditu began to withdraw from active politics, leaving more and more power to Tafari. Under Tafari's direction, Ethiopia entered the League of Nations, and abolished slavery. Zewditu busied herself with religious activities, such as the construction of a number of significant churches.

In 1928 there was a small conservative uprising against Tafari's reforms, but it was unsuccessful. Empress Zewditu was compelled to grant Tafari, who now controlled most of the Ethiopian government, the title of King (Negus). While Negus Tafari remained under the nominal rule of Zewditu (who was still Negeste Negest, i.e. Empress), Tafari was now in effect the ruler of Ethiopia. A number of attempts were made to displace him, but they were all unsuccessful. In 1930, Zewditu's husband Ras Gugsa Welle led a rebellion against Negus Tafari in Begemder, hoping to end the regency in spite of his wife's repeated pleas and orders to desist, but was defeated and killed in battle by the modernised Ethiopian army at the Battle of Anchem on 31 March 1930.

=== Death and succession ===
On 2 April 1930, two days after Ras Gugsa Welle was killed in battle, Empress Zewditu died. According to some popular histories, Zewditu died of shock and grief at hearing of her husband's death, but other accounts contradict this, claiming that Zewditu was not informed of the battle's outcome before her sudden death. Some diplomatic sources in Addis Ababa reported at the time that the fever-stricken Empress was immersed in a large container of frigidly cold holy water to cure her of her illness, but that her body went into shock, and she died shortly thereafter.

Zewditu was succeeded on the throne by Negus Tafari, who took the name of Emperor Haile Selassie.

== Family tree ==
	Menelik II; 1844 – 1913		Weyziro Abechi; Consort			Yohannes IV; 1837 – 1889
Gugsa Welle; 1875 – 1930; Fourth husband		Zewditu I 1876 – 1930		Gwangul Zegeye; Second husband	Wube Atnaf Seged; Third husband	Araya Selassie Yohannes; 1867 – 1888; First husband

=== Patrilineal descent ===
Patrilineal descent
1. Dil Na'od (Last king of Axum)
2. Mkhbara Widam (Mahbere-Widam)
3. Agba Seyun (Yakob)
4. Sinfa Ar'ad
5. Negus Zaré
6. Asfiha
7. Yakob
8. Bahr Seggad
9. Adam Asgad (Widma Asgad)
10. Tasfa Iyasus
11. Yekuno Amlak, emperor of Ethiopia, 12??–1285
12. Prince Qidma Seggada
13. Amda Seyon I, emperor of Ethiopia
14. Newaya Krestos, emperor of Ethiopia
15. Dawit I, emperor of Ethiopia
16. Zara Yaqob, emperor of Ethiopia, 1399–1468
17. Baeda Maryam I, emperor of Ethiopia, 1448–1478
18. Na'od, emperor of Ethiopia, 14??–1508
19. Dawit II, emperor of Ethiopia, c. 1496–1540
20. Prince Segwa Qal
21. Warada Qal
22. Lesba Qal
23. Negasi Krestos, ruler of Shewa
24. Sebestyanos, ruler of Shewa
25. Kidane Kale, ruler of Shewa
26. Amha Iyasus, ruler of Shewa
27. Asfaw Wossen, ruler of Shewa
28. Wossen Seged, 1808–1813, ruler of Shewa
29. Sahle Selassie, king of Shewa, 1795–1847
30. Haile Melekot, king of Shewa, 1824–1855
31. Menelik II, emperor of Ethiopia, 1844–1913
32. Empress Zewditu, 1876–1930

Zewditu House of Solomon Born: 29 April 1876 Died: 2 April 1930
Regnal titles
Preceded by Iyasu V	Empress of Ethiopia; 27 September 1916 – 2 April 1930	Succeeded by Haile Selassie I
