= Sebhat Aregawi =

Ethiopian governor (died 1914)

Sebhat Aregawi ሰብሐት አረገዊ
- Dejazmach

Shum of Agame
- Reign: 1892–1914
- Predecessor: Aregawi Sabagadis
- Successor: Kahsai Sebhat
- Born: Adigrat, Agame, Tigray Province, Ethiopian Empire
- Died: 28 February 1914
- Issue: Dejazmatch Asgedom Sebhat; Woizero Gereda Sebhat; Woizero Lemlem Sebhat; Woizero Hareya Sebhat; Woizero Semret Sebhat; Emebet Abebech Sebhat; Shum Agame Desta Sebhat; Woizero Zenebech Sebhat; Ras Kassa Sebhat; Dejazmatch Ayele Sebhat; Lij Gebrezgi Sebhat
- House: House of Agame
- Father: Dejazmach Aregawi Sabagadis

Sebhat Aregawi (died 28 February 1914) was a Ras of Agame. He was appointed governor of Agame by Emperor Tewodros II in 1859, and his province was expanded by Emperor Yohannes IV to include Adigrat. Emperor Menelik II invested Sebhat with the title of Ras in 1892.

== Biography ==
Ras Sebhat was the son of Dejazmatch Aregawi Sabagadis of Agame, and grandson of the popular governor of Tigray, Ras Sabagadis Woldu. At the time he challenged Ras Mangesha Yohannes, who had succeeded his slain father Yohannes IV and was asserting his supremacy in Tigray, Sebhat was described as "a clever and intelligent man in his early forties, an excellent administrator but not a distinguished warrior."

Sebhat submitted to the overlordship of Ras Mangesha 11 September 1889, following the death of Emperor Yohannes IV Ras Mangesha's father. However, on 31 October of that year he secretly informed Eritrean governor Antonio Baldissera that he preferred Menelik's rule to Mangesha Yohannes. While fighting with Mangesha over rulership of Tigray, in June 1890 he sent his own son Dasta as a hostage, in an effort to create peace. In August of that year Dasta fled from Adwa and returned to his father. Sebhat refused to send him back and war seemed inevitable. He was then imprisoned by Mangesha in 1891 after his revolt was crushed. In 1895, he escaped from prison and aligned himself with the Italians during their invasion of Ethiopia. However, after the massacre at Amba Alagi, Sebhat deserted the Italians and joined the forces of Menelik II, later participating at the Battle of Adwa on the side of the Ethiopians.

In 1914 Lij Iyasu V, the uncrowned successor to Emperor Menilik II, was reported to have promised Agame to Gebre Selassie, which would have made Gebre Selassie the most powerful ruler in Tigray. Disturbed by the rumour, Sebhat used Gebre Selassie's friendship with the Italians to arouse suspicions in Addis Ababa, claiming that Selassie was intriguing with the Italians with the intention of defying Iyasu. Without investigating the basis of the accusations, Iyasu ordered Gebre Selassie to the capital to explain his position. Gebre Selassie refused, and in desperation tried to start a war between the Italian colony of Eritrea and Ethiopia, but the Italians refused to respond. By February 16 Addis Ababa declared Selassie to be in rebellion.

After much persuasion, and with promises to not be harassed by Sebhat, Gebre Selassie did travel to the capital. At the same time, it was reported that Ras Sebhat had occupied some of Selassie's territory. Sebhat and Gebre Selassie became great rivals.

On 24 February, when Gebre Selassie was three days away from Adwa, he received word that Sebhat was marching there. Gebre Selassie turned back, and the next day battled with Sebhat at Zebewu, halfway between Adwa and Adigrat, along with two of his sons: Asgedom and Araya. Four days later Sebhat and two of his sons travelling with him were assassinated. Gebreselassie ordered Sebhat, Asgedom, and Araya to be buried in Gunda Gundo Monestary.

== Popular culture ==
Sebhat Aregawi is remembered as a hero in eastern Tigray. The main hospital in Adigrat is named after him: Adigrat Ras Sebhat Hospital.
