= Adigrat =

City in Tigray Region, Ethiopia

Adigrat ዓዲግራት
- City
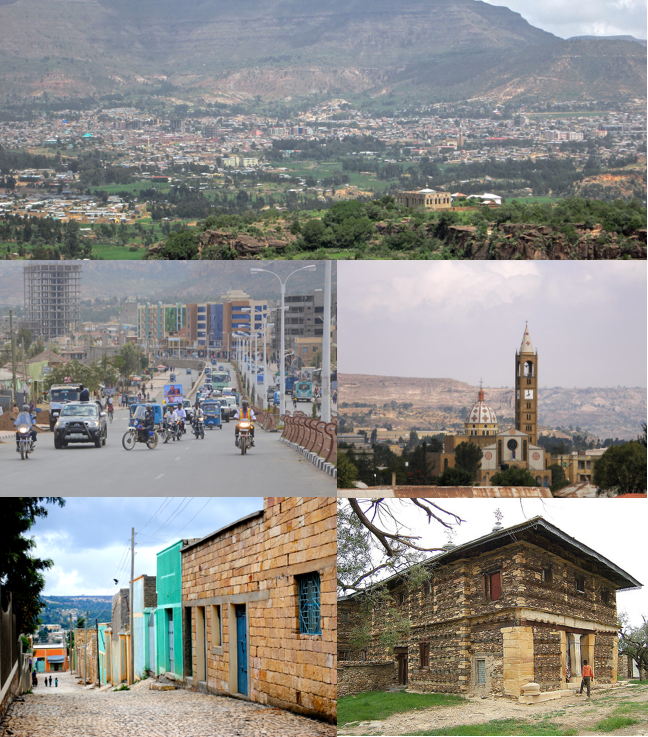
- Clockwise from top: Adigrat panoramic view, Cathedral of the Holy Savior, Debre Damo Monastery, typical street, downtown.

- Location within Ethiopia Location within the Horn of Africa Location within Africa
- Coordinates: 14°16′N 39°27′E
- Country: Ethiopia
- Region: Tigray
- Zone: Misraqawi (Eastern)
- Woreda: Adigrat

Area
  - Total: 18.77 km^{2} (7.25 sq mi)
- Elevation: 2,457 m (8,061 ft)

Population (2007)
  - Total: 57,588
  - Estimate (2021): 116,193
  - Density: 3,703/km^{2} (9,590/sq mi)
- Time zone: UTC+03:00 (EAT)
- Post Code: 20
- Area code: (+251) 34
- Website: www.adigratcity.org.et

Adigrat (Tigrinya: ዓዲግራት, romanized: ʿAddigrat,; also spelled ʿAddi Grat) is a city and separate woreda in Tigray Region of Ethiopia. It is located in the Misraqawi Zone at longitude and latitude 14°16′N 39°27′E, with an elevation of 2,457 metres (8,061 ft) above sea level and below a high ridge to the west. Adigrat is a strategically important gateway to Eritrea and the Red Sea. Adigrat was part of Ganta Afeshum woreda before a separate woreda was created for the city. Currently, Adigrat serves as the capital of the Eastern Tigray zone.

Adigrat is one of the most important cities of Tigray, which evolved from earlier political centers and camps of regional governors. Antalo, Aläqot and Adigrat were a few of them. The decline of Antalo was followed by the rise of Adigrat as another prominent, yet short-lived, capital of Tigray. It used to serve as the capital of Agame.

== History ==
=== 17th-18th century ===
Adigrat became the center of the Tigrayan chief, dejazmach Kafle Wahid, the viceroy of atse Fasilides during the first half of the 17th century.

=== 19th Century ===
Adigrat emerged as the political capital of Tigray when dejazmach Sabagadis Woldu of Agame assumed the governorship of the region in the period 1822-30. Sabagadis set up some palaces, churches, and markets. This increasingly attracted both natives and foreigners to establish permanent residences and a few shops in the town. Adigrat was an important market center for salt, which was mined in the Afar districts of Areho and Berale in eastern Tigray. However, it declined after the death of its patron, Sabagadis, in 1830. It was repeatedly attacked, sacked, and plundered by the lowlanders and political rivals of Sabagadis. Samuel Gobat had joined countless Ethiopians in fleeing there for safety in the days immediately after Sabagadis' death.

When the missionary Johann Ludwig Krapf passed through Adigrat in April 1842, "almost the whole is in ruins", and observed that a nearby village, Kersaber, was "much larger than Adigrat." In the late 1860s the town had a rural appearance and much of it is still under cultivation today.

During the First Italian-Abyssinian War, the Italians occupied Adigrat on 25 March 1895 and used it as a base to support their advance south to Mek'ele. General Antonio Baldissera refortified the settlement after the Italian defeat at the Battle of Adowa, but Emperor Menelik II insisted on its surrender at the beginning of the peace talks that concluded the war; Baldissera was ordered to evacuate Adigrat, which he did 18 May 1896. Augustus B. Wylde a few years later described Adigrat as having a Saturday market of medium size.

=== 20th Century ===
Lazarists introduced perhaps the first modern school of northern Ethiopia in Adigrat at the turn of the 20th century. However, like most Ethiopian towns, Adigrat increased its commercial and administrative importance during the period of the Italian occupation. The Italians introduced the first elements of modern infrastructure, including stronger fortresses, restaurants, residential houses, a health center, schools, roads, piped water, an electric generator, etc.

The Italians again occupied Adigrat at the beginning of the Second Italian-Abyssinian War 7 October 1935. The Italians were met there on the 11th by Ras Haile Selassie Gugsa, who had been courted by the Italians to ignite a widespread defection of the Tigrayan aristocracy; instead, he had been soundly defeated a few days before by Dejazmach Haile Kebbede of Wag, and presented himself to the invaders with only 1200 followers. Anthony Mockler notes that despite the fact the young Ras shook Ethiopian morale, "this was the first and last open defection to the Italians of an important noble and his men."

In 1938, there were shops and hotel-restaurants (“Bologna”, “Piemontese”, “Centrale”). There was also a post, telephone and telegraph office, a health post and a Catholic Apostolic Prefecture.

Adigrat was captured by rebels in the Woyane rebellion 25 September 1943, forcing the Ethiopian government administrators to flee to neighboring Eritrea. By 1958 the city was one of 27 places in Ethiopia ranked as a First Class Township.

During the 1970s, Agazi Comprehensive High School, and together with the town's Catholic junior high school, became centers of anti-government dissent. The presence outside of town of a large military base, served as a focus for protesting students, and also as a source for their hopes of a military coup.

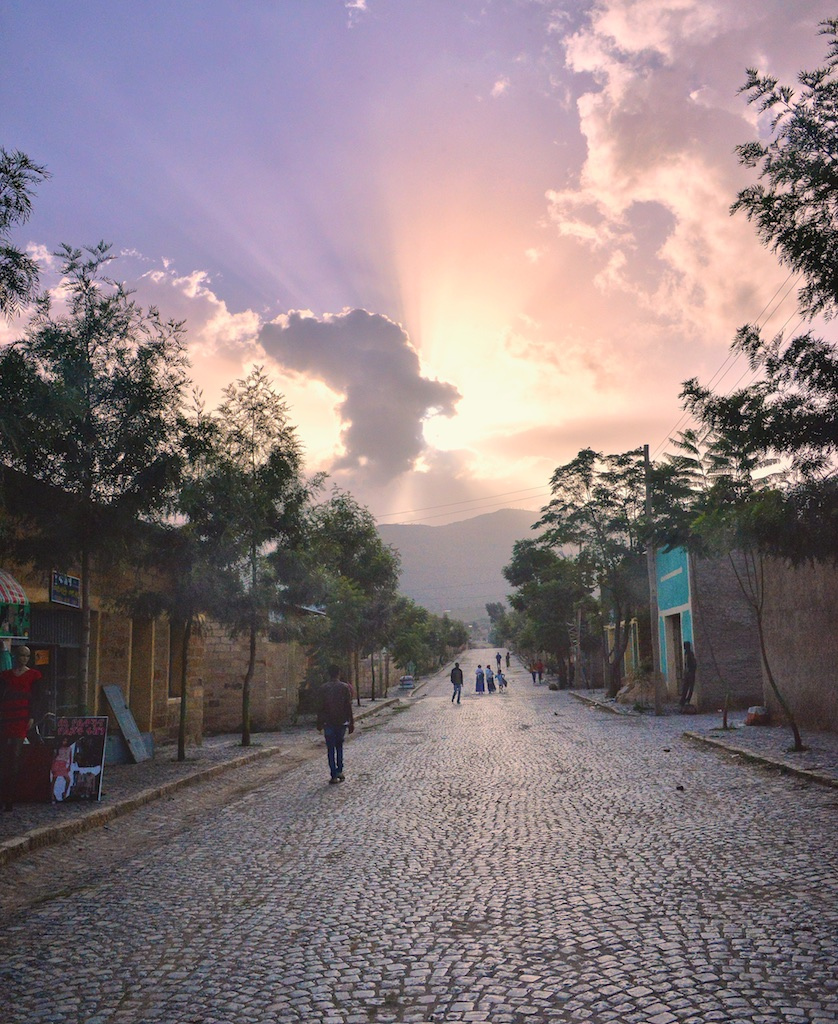
Street scene.

Adigrat's dependence on merchandising and trade meant that the Derg's imposition of commercial and transport restrictions was strongly felt and resented. Under the Derg business licenses became progressively more difficult to get, and traders' trucks were requisitioned for the transport of war-related materials to army bases in Eritrea. Permits of travel were required; convoys were introduced by 1976; and the road links to Asmara were virtually broken, largely by the ELF, by the late 1970s.

During the first years of the Ethiopian Civil War, the fledgling Tigrayan People's Liberation Front drew support from these groups. Derg forces took Adigrat during Operation Adwa in the summer of 1988. The same day that the Third Revolutionary Army was crushed at Battle of Shire, 19 February 1989, government troops and officials evacuated Adigrat. According to Africa Watch they caused widespread destruction in the town before they left.

In May 1988, Adigrat was bombed from the air by the Ethiopian Air Force.

A pharmaceutical factory which became operational in 1997, was set up in the town.

=== 21st Century ===
During the 2020-2021 Tigray War, attacks were carried out on Adigrat by the joint Ethiopian and Eritrean armies, including aerial bombardments. On 19 December 2020, an EEPA report stated that 16 civilians were killed while trying to stop Eritrean and ENDF soldiers from robbing the Addis Pharmaceutical Factory. On 19 December 2020, Catholic Bishop Tesfaselassie Medhin of Adigrat has been reported safe in his residence. The Apostolic Nuntius to Ethiopia, Archbishop Antoine Camilleri, expressed “solidarity with Bishop Medhin who was missing in the assembly because of the situation in his diocese where the war is hard hit.”

Amidst the 2026 Eritrean invasion of Ethiopia the Eritrean Defence Forces seized control or the city.

== Main sights ==
There are different sights near Adigrat that can be visited by tourists like:-

Debre Damo is the name of a flat-topped mountain, or amba, and a 6th-century monastery in northern Ethiopia. The mountain is a steeply rising plateau of trapezoidal shape, about 1000 by 400 m in dimension. It is northwest of Adigrat, in the Mehakelegnaw Zone of the Tigray Region, close to the border with Eritrea.

Gunda Gunde is an Ethiopian Orthodox Tewahedo monastery located to the south of Adigrat in the Misraqawi (Eastern) Zone of the northern Tigray Region in Ethiopia. It is known for its prolific scriptorium, as well as its library of Ge'ez manuscripts. This collection of over 220 volumes, all but one dating from before the 16th century, is one of the largest collections of its kind in Ethiopia.

Abuna Yemata Guh is a monolithic church located in the Hawzen woreda of the Tigray Region south west of Adigrat. It is situated at a height of 2,580 metres (8,460 ft) and has to be climbed on foot to reach. It is notable for its dome and wall paintings dating back to the 5th century and its architecture.

== Cityscape ==
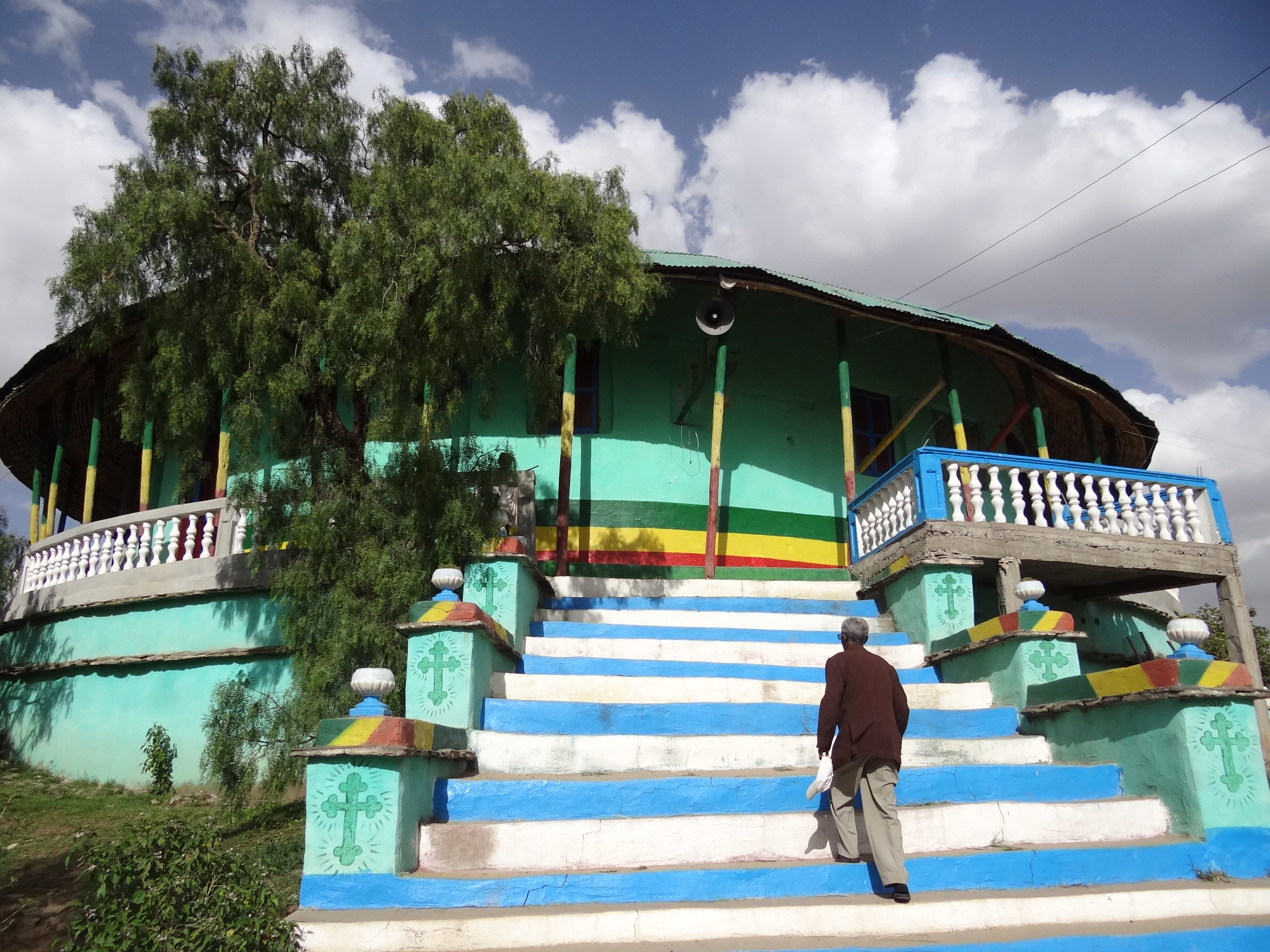
Adigrat Chirkos Church

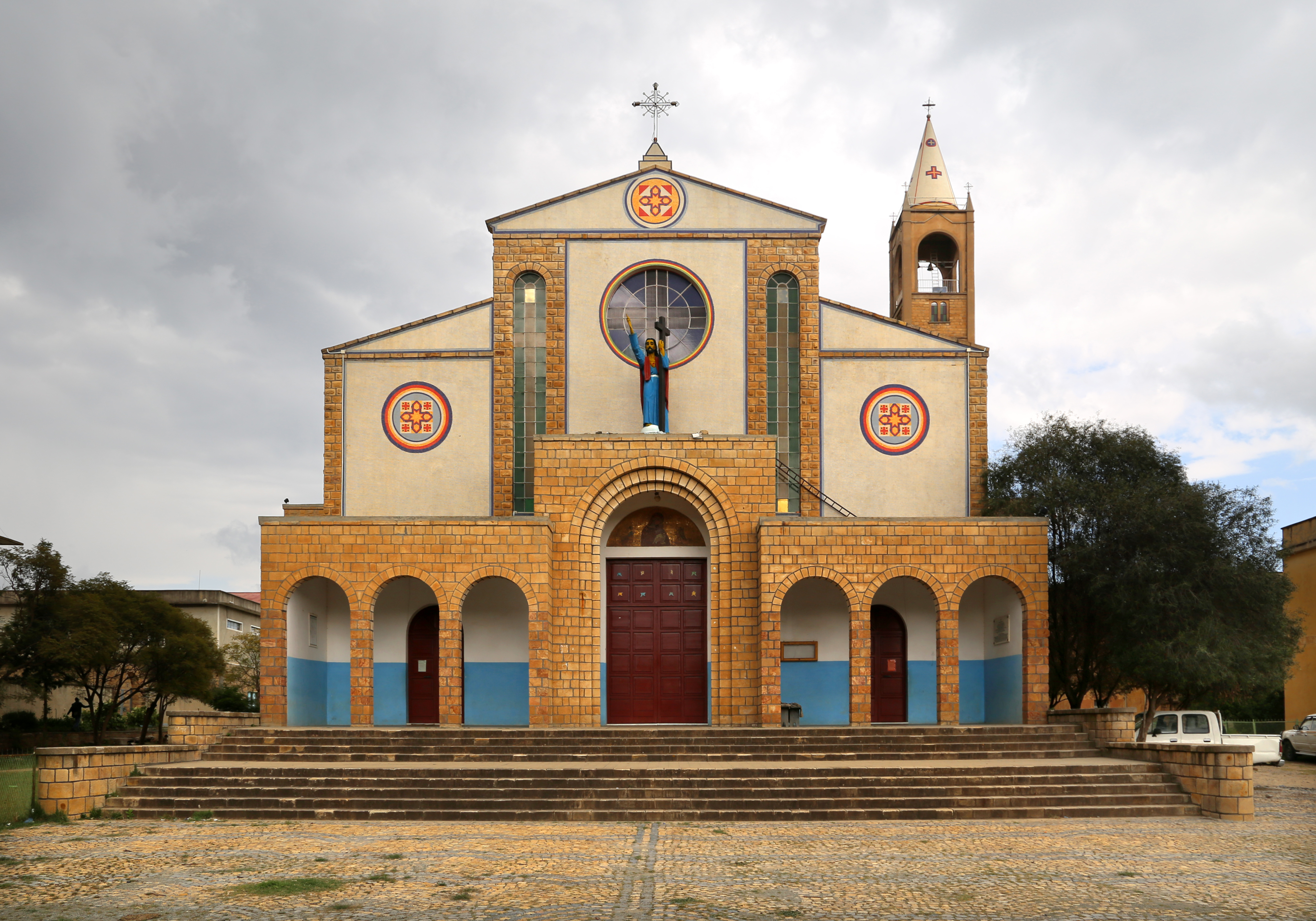
Cathedral of the Holy Saviour

Adigrat, the capital of the Agamé district, has a rich aristocratic and political history. In town are the remnants of two castles from the Zemene Mesafint ("Era of the Princes"), one owned by Dej Desta, the other by the Ras Sebhat Aregawi. Other sites of interest:

- 19th-century Adigrat Chirkos - was strategically built on a hill near Dej Desta's castle, so that Desta could see the church from his bedroom balcony.
- A few years after World War II land was obtained in the center of Adigrat at a site called "Welwalo". In view of the possibility that one day it might become a church, the "Holy Saviour" was built and used regularly as a parish church. After the establishment of the Ethiopian Catholic hierarchy in 1961 that church was destined to become the cathedral of the Eparchy of Adigrat. After appropriate modifications were made the formal and official consecration of the Cathedral Catholic of the Holy Saviour took place on 19 April 1969. It has an Italian design, but incorporates work by Ethiopian artist Afewerk Tekle.
- Italian War cemetery commemorates some 765 Italian soldiers who died between 1935 and 1938.
- Adigrat also hosts a market and a newly constructed community park.

== Churches and monasteries ==
As of 2013, 112 church institutions were registered in the woreda. Churches and monasteries in the woreda that contain historical manuscripts and artefacts include:

- ʿAddigrat Däbrä Mänkǝrat Qǝddus Qirqos
- ʿAddigrat Däbrä Mädhanit Mädḫane ʿAläm

== Demographics ==
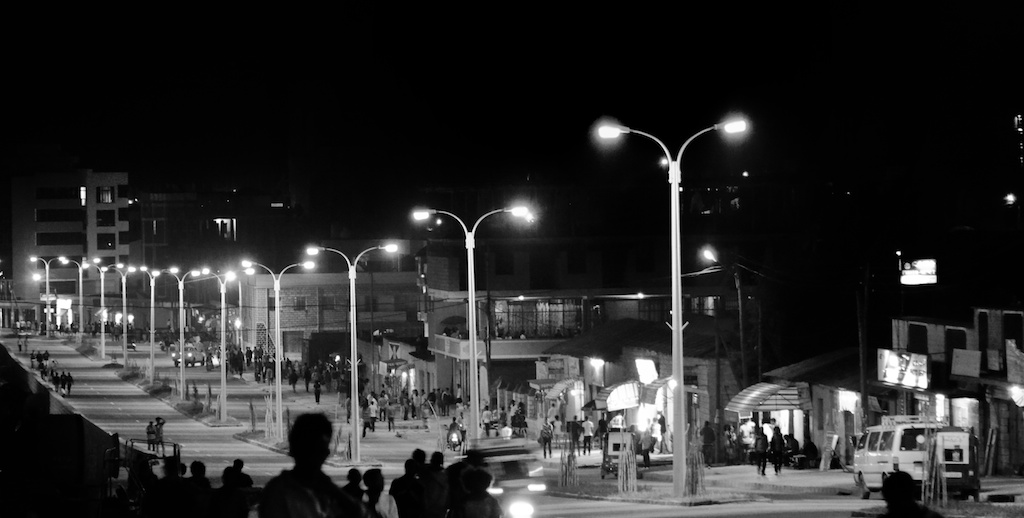
Adigrat downtown

In 1938, the town counted 4296 inhabitants (including 137 Italians).

Based on the 2007 national census conducted by the Central Statistical Agency of Ethiopia (CSA), this town had a total population of 57,588, of whom 26,010 were male and 31,578 female. The majority of the inhabitants said they practiced Ethiopian Orthodox Christianity, with 94.01% reporting that as their religion, while 3.02% of the population were Catholics, and 2.68% were Muslim.

The 1994 census reported it had a total population of 37,417 of whom 17,352 were men and 20,065 were women.

== Geography ==
Surrounded by a range of mountains (the peak of which is Alaqwa), Adigrat held a strategic position at the junction of the crossroads between Adwa in the west, Asmara and Massawa in the north and Mekelle in the south. Towards the east, it is delimited by the spectacular edge of the north-eastern Ethiopian escarpment dropping into the lowlands. Adigrat was interconnected with the prominent trade routes linking Tigray and the Red Sea, on the one hand, and such old market-towns as Adwa, Hawzen, Antalo and Mekelle, on the other.

The Huga river runs through Adigrat. The city is spread widely on both banks of the river. Adigrat is located at altitude ranges from 2000 to 3000 m above sea level. The city has several prominent hills; one of the most prominent is Debre Damo which has a monastery at its peak.

=== Climate ===
Adigrat has a cold semi-arid climate (Köppen climate classification BSk). The overall climate throughout the year is mild and dry. The annual rainfall ranges between 400 and 600 mm, with most of the rain falling in the rainy season (June up to September).

Climate data for Adigrat, elevation 2,457 m (8,061 ft)
Month	Jan	Feb	Mar	Apr	May	Jun	Jul	Aug	Sep	Oct	Nov	Dec	Year
Average precipitation mm (inches)	6 (0.2)	5 (0.2)	42 (1.7)	54 (2.1)	42 (1.7)	38 (1.5)	139 (5.5)	154 (6.1)	17 (0.7)	14 (0.6)	31 (1.2)	10 (0.4)	552 (21.9)
Average relative humidity (%)	45	47	42	42	50	32	49	66	59	64	65	63	52
Source: FAO

== Economy ==
Addis Pharmaceuticals Factory has been operational since 1997. The city has a branch offices of Commercial Bank of Ethiopia, Dashen, Awash, Wegagen, and Ambessa. Adigrat's Chamber of Commerce actively organizes many of the business in the town. A modern water supply system was built at a cost of 126.4 million birr and was inaugurated on 27 June 2017.

== Arts and culture ==
Since 1961 it has been the center of the Adigrat Eparchy of the Vicariate Apostolic of Abyssinia.

In Adigrat Meskel is special. It is celebrated with carnival and lighting of damera.

== Religion and sources of knowledge ==
It has been known also the Gunda-Gundi monastery, from the 14th century up to its present existence for its source of peculiar type of religious manuscripts, innovation of medicine and medications/treatment of different sicknesses or curing of different diseases, the starting of small technologies like the fabrication or producing of oils, and other cosmetics for human uses using technologies, and it is a testimonial for other religious and other modernization activities and practices.

=== Food ===
Tihlo is a dish unique to Adigrat and the wider Eastern Tigray. It is prepared by kneading barley flour into softballs and preparing a meat stew with berbere, an Ethiopian spice, onions, tomato paste, water, and salt. The dish is eaten using a fork-shaped twig, which is unique in Ethiopian cuisine.

The beles, a cactus pear, grown in Adigrat is considered to be of high-quality.

The city is renowned for its white honey and tej, an Ethiopian honey-wine.

== Sports ==
Football and cycling are among the sports practiced in Adigrat. The city is represented in football by Welwalo Adigrat University FC, a club based in Adigrat that won promotion to the Ethiopian Premier League in 2017. Cycling is also present in the city; a 2017 Cyclist magazine feature described members of the local APF Cycling Club gathering in central Adigrat before a road ride. Adigrat was also included on the route of a road cycling tour in northern Ethiopia announced in 2019.

== Transportation ==
Adigrat is located along Ethiopian Highway 2, which connects the city with Addis Abeba and Mekelle. In Adigrat, Ethiopian Highway 2, turns off the main highway to the west in the direction of Adwa. To the north of Adigrat, Ethiopian Highway 20 connects the city to Kokobay and to Asmara in Eritrea.

== Education ==
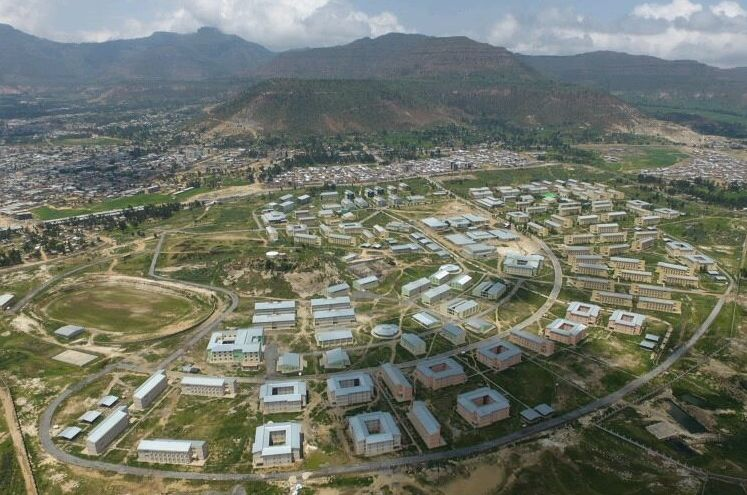
The Adigrat University grounds

The education system in Adigrat engages thousands of students in public and private schools. The first high school in Adigrat is Agazi Comprehensive High School which was established in the 1950s. As of 2013 there were 13 public schools and 7 private schools.

Adigrat is home to the Adigrat University which serves over 14,000 students. The technical school in Adigrat include TVET and Polytechnic College. There are two private colleges, namely, Ethio-lmage and New Millennium College.

The city has a public library.

== Notable inhabitants ==
- Tedros Adhanom, Director General of WHO
- Yohannes Haile-Selassie, paleoanthropologist
- Miruts Yifter, Olympic gold medal winning long distance runner
- Seyoum Mesfin, politician and diplomat, killed during the Tigray War
- Tsadkan Gebretensae military chief leader during Ethio-Eritirea and Tigray war
- Abeba Aregawi, Olympic bronze medal winning middle-distance runner
- Dejen Gebremeskel, Olympic bronze medal winning middle-distance runner
- Arkebe Oqubay economist
