= Subagadis Woldu =

Ethiopian governor (1780–1831)

Subagadis Woldu ሱባጋዲስ ወልዱ
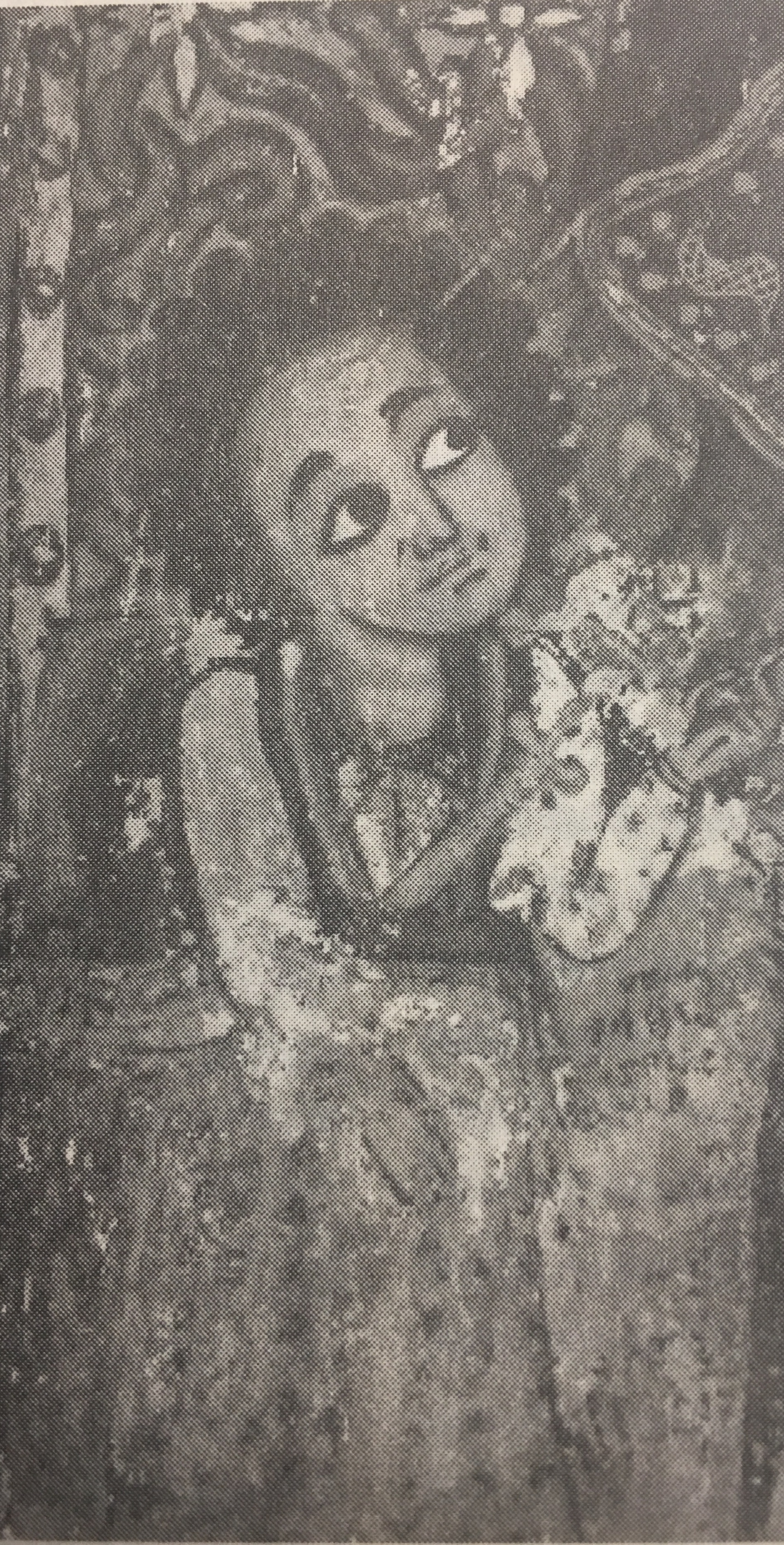
- A portrait of Sabagadis seeking the intercessions of St. Mary, on the wall iconography at the church of Gunda Gunde, Tigray.

Governor of Tigray
- In office 1822–1831
- Preceded by: Wolde Selassie
- Succeeded by: Wube Haile Maryam

Shum of Agame
- In office 1810–1831
- Preceded by: Woldu Kumanit
- Succeeded by: Aregawi Sabagadis

Personal details
- Born: 1780 Agame, Tigray Province, Ethiopian Empire
- Died: 1831 (aged 50–51) Debre Abbay, Ethiopian Empire

Subagadis Woldu, sometimes written as Sabagadis Woldu (Tigrinya: ሱባጋዲስ ዎልዱ; horse name: Abba Garray; baptismal name: Za-Manfas Qeddus; 1780 – 1831) was a governor of Tigray Province of the Ethiopian Empire from 1822 to 1831. Sabagadis gained some notoriety in the first decade of the 19th century for rebelling a number of times against his overlord, Ras Wolde Selassie. But just before the death of Wolde Selassie it seems that he made up with his master and became one of his loyal lieutenants. Following Wolde Selassie's death in 1816, he defied the authority of Wolde Selassie's son, and became the most powerful warlord in Tigray. Making Adigrat his capital, he ruled Tigray and the coastal plains of Eritrea by 1818. His rule also extended to the Eritrean highlands (Hamasien, Akele Guzay, and Seraye).

== Biography ==
=== Early life ===
Of Tigrayan & Irob descent, Dejazmatch Sabagadis was the son of Shum Agame Woldu Kumanit who ruled Agame from the late 18th to the early 19th centuries. Shum Agame Woldu's legacy was the ascendancy of Saho speaking local Irob rulers over Tigrinya speaking Agame in the 18th century. Following his father's death in 1802, Sabagadis and his four brothers clashed over their respective fiefs. Sabagadis remained a dissident contender for most of the 1800s and 1810s. He consolidated his power in Agame by foiling a series of punitive expeditions by Ras Wolde Selassie. In 1811, Sabagadis even rallied several Tigrinya-speaking vassals of Adwa, Shire and Hamasien against the ras. By the mid-1810s, Sabagadis de facto placed the whole of Agame under his authority. Ras Wolde Selassie then confirmed Sabagadis authority in return and recognition of the ras's overlordship.

=== Rise to Power ===
After the death of Wolde Selassie, Sabagadis was one of the strongest chiefs seeking to succeed the Ras. He fought a series of devastating wars with regional contenders and finally acquired the Tigrayan overlordship in 1822. Sabagadis governed Tigray for a decade by appointed loyalist chiefs and members of his family.

Assuming the title of Dejazmatch, he followed the ambitions of his predecessors to remove Yejju Were Sheik dynasty(Were Sheik Wollo) political supremacy from Gondar. This was particularly the case after the death of Ras Gugsa Mersa in 1825. To this end, he requested British recognition as well as the supply of military trainers, experts in various fields, and more firearms to boost his army.

Dejazmach Sabagadis believed that firearms were vital to neutralize the power of the Wollo cavalry, so he devoted much time and effort to both collecting them, and seeking Eu ropean help in buying them; this included seeking British help—or at least permission—to capture the port of Massawa. As a consequence, Sabagadis was one of the first Ethiopians to attempt building peaceful relationships with other countries in modern times. As a result of these things, by the 1820s he was seen both in Europe—and in Ethiopia—as the champion of Christianity.

Sabagadis also masterminded strong political and military alliances with some prominent regional chiefs in northern Ethiopia, especially Dejazmatch Wube Hailemariam of Semien (at times his son-in-law), Wag Shum Kanfu of Lasta and Dejazmatch Goshu Zewde of Gojjam against the Yejju ruler in Gondar, Ras Maruye Gugsa. He presented himself as a protector of Christianity, accusing the Yejju lords of being Muslim agents. He aspired to become the Ras Bitwoded and protector of the weak kings in Gondar.

Three of his letters have survived. One to the Patriarch of Alexandria Peter complains of the behavior of Abuna Qerellos, sarcastically asking, "Was it because you hated Ethiopia that you sent him? Did you not know his conduct before, [and] so you sent him?" Another one is addressed to King George IV of Great Britain, asking for "one hundred cavalrymen, a carpenter, [and] a church builder who will build the way [you do] in your country".

Sabagadis maintained constant communication with the most important Christian lords in Ethiopia. Building upon his reputation, he formed a coalition with the lords of Gojjam, Lasta and Semien against Ras Marye of Yejju, the Enderase or regent of the Emperor. Marye defeated Dejazmach Goshu in Gojjam, marched the bulk of his army to Lasta, then quickly turned to Semien Province and attacked Wube Haile Maryam. Subagadis watched the battle on the border of Lasta, and subsequently did not come to the aid of Wube. Wube preferred to submit to Marye rather than have to face him alone. Marye decided to put an end to the Tigrean threat. At the head of contingents from Wollo, Yejju, Begemder and Amhara, and now (forcibly) supported by the armies of Wube and Goshu, Marye advanced beyond the Tekezé River into Tigray.

Neither Sabagadis foreign contacts nor his military pact with Wube Hailemariam bore fruit. He was soon overtaken by a fresh outbreak of extensive fighting engulfing the whole of northern Ethiopia. Maruya won Wube to his side after initial military encounters led to the rampaging of his province of Semien. In 1830, Sabagadis ravaged Semien, having defeated and even chased Wube out of his fortress called "Amba Tazzan" and "Amba Hay". Sabagadis then retired to Agame in Tigray after appointing Wube's rival and half-brother, Dejazmatch Merso Hailemariam, as his representative to Semien.

=== Demise ===
However, this victory triggered Maruye, in collaboration with the fugitive Wube, to launch a vigorous campaign against Tigray. Three Tigrayan vassals of Sabagadis, including his own sons-in-law Dejazmatch Sahlu of Haramat, Dejazmatch Gebre Mikael of Dera, and Wedaj of Shire were also said to have defected. They conspired against Sabagadis with Wube and Maruye Gugsa. According to informants, Sabagadis did not accept the advice to wait near Adigrat for the enemy to march into Tigray where Sabagadis' army would have had plenty of advantages. The two forces met for the showdown in western Tigray near the Tekezé and the Tigrayans were overwhelmed, losing the bloodiest battle they had ever faced during the Zemene Mesafint. The armies of Dejazmach Sabagadis and Ras Marye met on the 14 February 1831 and the Battle of Debre Abbay began. Although the Tigrayans had by far the greater number of firearms, the matchlockmen were poorly employed and the Yejju cavalry won the field after a bloody fight. The battle of Debre Abbay concluded with Sabagadis' capture and subsequent execution at the hands of the Oromo soldiers who wanted to revenge the death of their leader Maruye. Dori Gugsa succeeded his brother Maruye and appointed Wube over Tigray. Ras Sabagadis would surrender only to Ras Wube, his son-in-law. Wube dutifully handed him over to Marye's followers. On the 15th of February they beat Dejazmach Hagos Subagadis to death, and executed Sabagadis in retaliation for Marye's death. His remains reportedly were later interred at the monastery of Gunda Gunde.

== Legacy ==
Sabagadis also established new churches such as Atsbi Selassie in Atsbi and Enda Medhanie Alem in Adwa and was closely connected to the monastery of Gunda Gunde, who patron he was. His descendants ruled over Agame until the 1974 Revolution.

Nearly a year after his death, although he was a Tigrayan, people all over the Amhara provinces lamented the loss of Sabagadis:

Alas! Sabagadis, the friend of all,

Has fallen at Daga Shaha, by the hand of Aubeshat [i.e. Wube]! Alas! Sabagadis, the pillar of the poor, Has fallen at Daga Shaha, weltering in his blood! The people of this country, will they find it a good thing To eat ears of corn which have grown in the blood? Who will remember [St] Michael of November [to give alms]? Mariam, with five thousand Gallas, had killed him [him, i.e., who remembered to give alms]: For the half of a loaf, for a cup of wine,

The friend of the Christians has fallen at Daga Shaha.

— Quoted in Samuel Gobat, Journal of Three years' Residence in Abyssinia, 1851 (New York: Negro Universities Press, 1969), p. 401

== Family ==
Sabagadis' sons were Wolde Mikael, Hagos, Kahsay, Sebhat and Shum Agame Aragawi. The later was actively involved in power struggles in Agame. A number of other children are claimed for him: Kassa, Balgada-Ar'aya (who rebelled against Wube and his older brother Wolde Mikael in 1838, and was defeated by them), and several daughters including Dinqinash, who was married by her father to Ras Wube three years before the Battle of Debre Abbay, and run away from ras wube for Gebre Egziabher the son of wolde silasse of Enderta.
