= Tigray Province =

Former province in northern Ethiopia

Coordinates: 14°N 39°E

Tigray Province (Tigrinya: ትግራይ), also known as Tigre (Amharic: ትግሬ tigrē), was a historical province of northern Ethiopia that overlaid the present day Afar and Tigray regions. Akele Guzai borders with the Tigray province. It encompassed most of the territories of Tigrinya-speakers (and a few minority groups) in Ethiopia. Tigray was separated from the northern Tigrinya speaking territories by the Mareb River, now serving as the state border to Eritrea, bordering Amhara region in the south.

Location of Tigray within the Ethiopian Empire

The great majority of inhabitants were Orthodox Christians (95.5% in 1994), with the exception of a small, but important Muslim subgroup (Jeberti) and a few Catholics (mainly Irob). Protestantism is only a very recent urban phenomenon. Despite a general impression of ethnic and cultural homogeneity, there were a few ethnic minorities, especially at the borders of Tigray, belonging to a non-Tigrinya groups, such as the Saho-speaking Irob at the north-eastern border to Eritrea, the people|Raya in the south-east, the Agaw-speaking H̬amta in Abergele north of Wag, a few Kunama in the Habesha Kunama woreda east of Humera, and scattered peripheral groups in the western lowlands across the tekeze, such as the Chare of the Sellim Bet (related with the Gumuz) and Tukrir in the Humera area.

Tigray went through numerous administrative changes in the course of its history. In 1991 Tigray was radically reshaped. During the reign of Haile Selassie I and also the following Derg period, Tigray did not yet encompass Wolkait (until 1991 having been part of Begemder), while Enderta in eastern Tigray extended over large Afar areas including the salt plains, which were given to the Afar Region. Still, in the 1930s the regions south of Enderta, i.e. Wajjarat and Angot, formed the separate governorate called "Southern Tigray". Tigray is the result of a merger of diverse historical northern provinces (with Tigrinya and Agaw speakers), which were often independent from each other.

== History ==
Today's unity of Tigrayan territories south of the Mereb river is a rather modern phenomenon. Most northern provinces were ruled by their governors, often descending from local dynasties and preserving a high degree of autonomy within the empire, e.g., in legal and judicial issues, taxation etc. Only rarely these territories were unified under one ruler.

The core of today's Tigray was the most important northern province and bore the name "Tigray". Usually it controlled adjacent territories, which might be the reason why the term Tigray basically encompassed only Adwa, Aksum and Yeha, and regularly extended over Hawzen (with Amba Enda Seyon) and Enticho. It included sometimes wider areas, such as Shire and Tembien, which, however, kept their separate identities and often their local governors.

Hawzen was an important province seemingly already in Aksumite times (with important early rock-hewn churches); according to the Gädlä Märqorewos, in the 13th century Hawzen encompassed wide areas from today's Hawzen to the Afar salt plains in the east. Consequently, over the centuries the realm of Tigray regularly extended over all these territories. Tembien was included in Tigray already in the 17th century, and at times also well before. An ancient permanent boundary of Tigray proper to the south is the Tekeze, in ancient sources equaled with the Nile River. Therefore, Tigray proper together with its dependencies was occasionally also called Täkkäze Məllaš ("beyond the Tekezze"). Over a long period, the capital of Tigray proper was Hawzen in the sub-province Haramat. Already in the 17th century, this town served as a seat of governors. In the 19th century, it again served as the capital, e.g. of Wube Haile Mariam and negus Negusse. Adwa assumed the role of capital in the 18th century under Amde Haymanot, and again later (starting from the 1880s in competition with the new capital Mekelle).

Tigray was of strategic importance, both symbolically, as it included the sacred town of Aksum, and economically, due to important trade routes from the east (i.e. Agame and Enderta) and the north. It included fertile plains (e.g.,. to the west of Aksum), and strategically important mountains. According to Markham in 1869, the Abyssinians say "Who holds Amba Tsion holds Tigré". Still in the 20th century, Tigray proper was a province of its in the framework of a wider homonymous province, also called Tigray. Even if well before the 20th century occasionally the term Tigray already extended over areas outside of Tigray proper, local parlance preserved the old provincial names, and the term Tigray is still used by rural people of Tigray as referring only to Adwa Awrajja, while other regions of modern Tigray are still considered to be "outside Tigray" by elders and rural people.

Several names of the other northern provinces in today's Tigray are very ancient (for example, the Agame were already mentioned in the Monumentum Adulitanum), and persisted from their first mention in ancient inscriptions or medieval documents until modernity, while others only existed temporarily, shaped for the needs of newly appointed governors. Historical provinces are Shire, Adyabo, Haramat (with Hawzen), Geralta, Tembien (or Weri mallash, its border river Weri separating it from Tigray proper), Agame (including the Irob mountains), Sira (in the 20th century replaced by the Kelette Awlealo awrajja), Wemberta (with Asbi and Dara), Enderta (historically including the Arho saltplains of the Afar lowlands, with the Balgada, the controller of the salt trade), Sehart, Selewa, Wejjarat, Rayya Azebo (submitted only in the 19th century by atse Yohannes IV), and in the west Sellemt and Wälqayt (originally encompassing only the Western Tigray highlands), and finally, the Mezega lowlands including the former Muslim sultanate in the west successively included into the sphere of influence of Welqayt. Some smaller territories were at times independent from the rulers of these greater provinces; the exact boundaries could change quickly following the political (and military) fortunes of their rulers.

The spiritual core of Tigray was and is Aksum. Even if being formally under the rulership of the central province (Tigray proper), the town enjoyed a special status, as a free city with its self-government. Its administrators were the nəburä əd, a governor appointed by the Ethiopian ruler, and the qarigeta, the mayor elected by the male members of the seven "Aksumite clans" of Aksum, Mäläkya, Ak̠sum, Bägio, Fərhəba, Kudukʷi, Wäldmaybih, Ak̠oround Näfas. These encompassed the entire whole indigenous city population, who was not to pay any taxes. The nəburä əd represented the sphere of the Ethiopian state and often descended from the local leading families; if he was a layman, he appointed an afä nəburä ed (speaker of the nəburä əd) for the administration of church issues. Aksum as the guardian of the Tables of the Law (s̩əlatä muse, also identified as tabotä s̩əyon; Ark of Covenant) was regarded as "a church". On this ground, its priests did not allow atse Yohannes IV to permanently establish his royal kätäma (camp) there, who therefore used Mekelle as his capital. The city population managed to defend their traditional self-government - with the qarigeta being independent from the nəburä əd - even throughout the 20th century politics of centralization by atse Haile Selassie I.

=== First mention of Tigray in ancient sources ===
The oldest inscriptions and texts referring to the population of the Aksumite kingdom and its neighbors do not know the term Tigray yet; they show an ethnic diversity, which has partially disappeared today. A variant of the term Tigray, first appears in a 10th-century gloss to Cosmas Indicopleustes, i.e. after the Aksumite period; according to this source important groups of the region were the "Tigrētai" and the "Agazē" (i.e. the Agʿazi), the latter being the Aksumites. The toponym Tigray is probably originally ethnic, the "Tigrētai" then meant "the tribes near Adulis". These are believed to be the ancient people from whom the present-day Tigray, the Eritrean tribes Tigre, and Biher-Tigrinya descended from. The term may not be Ethiosemitic, predating the Sabaean presence in Ethiopia. It is not excluded that the term tkɜr.w ("Tekaru") from a list of southern peoples and countries allegedly subdued by Pharaonic Egypt in the 15th century BC may already be linked with the term Tigray; in this case, it should mean a region within or in the vicinity of Punt.

=== Population history ===
Tigray was densely populated since ancient times; research in Lake sediments of Ashenge show that ecological change started with first dense settlements ca. 4,000 years ago. Today's Tigray region is the result of a complex process of internal migrations, cultural assimilation, and also expansion (in western Tigray), as well as of unification, separation, and reunification of diverse Tigrinya sub-groups and provides; starting from an early age Tigray was marked by dynamics of interaction between Cushitic-speaking groups (probably the most ancient population of Tigray) and Semitic-speakers, whose language and political culture makes Tigray deeply. Place names are usually of Cushitic and Semitic origin; several of the latter can be linked with toponyms in southern Arabia. Pre-Aksumite inscriptions show that Tigray was marked by a Sabaean-influenced kingdom (D'mt), which had merged with local culture. In later Aksumite times migration again linked both sides of the Red Sea, with Aksumite settlements also on the Arabian side. Toponyms indicate that the Tigray highlands had an important (Pre-) Agaw population in ancient times (the house-style specific for Agaw regions reaching up to Aksum, in a region with Agaw toponyms); north of Tigray there was a Beja migration after the fall of Aksum, and later several migrations of Agaw groups.

Overpopulated Tigray was a source for migrations over centuries, e.g., to the south, numerous southern groups claiming origin from Tigray. There are numerous other examples of groups who migrated from Tigray at different times. For example, oral traditions collected by Conti Rossini report on such migrations. The important Ǝggäla sub-group is found both in Tigray and Akele Guzay. One of the last important migrations from Tigray took place in the 19th century, when atse Yohannes IV placed Tigrayan lords as governors over the Mereb Mellash (i.e. mainly the Eritrean highlands), such as was Alula Engeda from Tembien. Many Tembienay settled especially in the Asmara area, mixing with the local inhabitant. The foundation of the Italian Colonia Eritrea attracted further migrants from Tigray.

The population of Tigray has preserved ancient self-designations, usually linked with the names of their historical provinces (at least some of which might originally have been ethnonyms); etymologically some can be linked to the Ethio-Sabaean past (e.g. Səra), but most are of unclear etymology. Inhabitants of Tigray call themselves Tägaru (Tigrinya singular Təgraway; Amharic plural Təgrawiyan [neolog. from Ge'ez], Təgre). Examples for other ancient province names and self-designation are Agame, Rayya, Səra (Säba Səra; in the Atsbi area Sərəti for a sub-group), Tembien, etc. In oral tradition, the terms 'Again' and 'Sabawiyan' for the inhabitants of Tigray proper and Agame are still in use. Other ancient ethnonyms are still preserved in names of villages or small districts (e.g., the 8th/9th century Gämbela, now a village south of Mekelle; the "kingdom" Agabo, known from the stelae of Maryam Anza, in village names in eastern Tigray).

=== Modern Tigray ===
Modern Tigray as a united province has its origin in the unification of its (sub-)provinces by atse Yohannes IV and his successors. This did not, however, change the ancient claims for autonomy by local leaders and by several quite egalitarian, non-feudalist peasant communities. After its heyday under Yohannes, Tigray was heavily challenged, and was gradually reduced in importance within Ethiopia, and outside influence within Tigray increased. Tigray oral traditions preserve numerous poems and legends which report on Tigray resistance against non-Tigray lords. Leading to the Battle of Adwa, Tigray was described as one of the two regions - alongside the region Shewa - which played a significant role in keeping Ethiopia's independence. Much of Tigray was briefly occupied by the Italians in the format of the 1896 Battle of Adwa. Against, Tigray was one of the major battlegrounds during the Italian War 1935–36, with initial success by the Ethiopians in the First Battle of Tembien in January 1936, and their dramatic defeat in the Second Battle a month later; after the Battle of Maychew in southern Tigray (followed by attacks of Rayya against atse Haile Selassie's army), the Ethiopian government collapsed.

During the Italian occupation, Tigray was included in Eritrea, and then after 1941 reunified with restored Ethiopia. Haile Sellasie's harsh measures to establish control by the central government, however, quickly led to local resistance. Significantly, the Woyone rebellion started in the province of Wejjerat, which was especially marked by egalitarian structures. After the rebels had captured the capital Mekelle, heavy bombing by the British in 1943 ended the uprising. This was followed by a further process of marginalization of Tigray, which was heavily affected by the 1970s and 1980s famines (often caused by resettlement measures).

The decline of Tigrayan ethnic population in Ethiopia (and in present-day districts like Addi Arkay (woreda), Kobo (woreda) & Sanja (woreda)), during Haile Selassie's rule is likely to have been his immense oppression & systematic persecution against non-Amhara ethnic people of Ethiopia (in particular, his immense systematic persecution of Tigrayans). For example, on the 1958 Tigray famine, Haile Selassie refused to send basic emergency food aid to Tigray province even though he had the money; so in consequence over 100,000 people died of the famine (in Tigray province).

Later on, the Mengistu Haile Mariam-led military dictatorship (Derg) also used the 1983–1985 famine in Ethiopia as government policy (by restricting food supplies) for counter-insurgency strategy, and for "social transformation" in non-insurgent areas (against people of Tigray province, Wello province and so on). Due to organized government policies that deliberately multiplied the effects of the famine, around 1.2 million people died in Ethiopia from this famine where majority of the death tolls were from Tigray province (and other parts of northern Ethiopia).

== Cultural heritage ==
The cultural heritage of Tigray is particularly rich. Tigray hosts the UNESCO world heritage site of the Aksum stelae park, numerous medieval rock-hewn churches, with a special concentration in eastern Tigray and other church buildings dating from the ancient Aksumite period (such as Debre Damo monastery), often richly painted. Archaeological research has been able to document a great density of cultural remain from the Stone Age until medieval times.

Tigray as the core of the Aksumite Empire bears the oldest witnesses of Christianization of the region. The monastery Enda Abba Selama, an important, but remote pilgrimage site in the mountains of Tembien, is said to host the grave of Frumentius; monasteries and churches attributed to the Nine Saints are found all over Tigray. The sometimes rich manuscript collections of church and monasteries are under threat due to economic decline of the Church (following the 20th century land reforms); they preserve some of the oldest surviving manuscripts of Ethiopia (such as in the monastery Enda Abba Gerima near Adwa).

Most important for the reconstruction of the history of regional interrelations, political and genealogical alliances and dependencies, governors, and ancient administrative structure are land charters, documenting g'əlti and rəst rights. The most prominent text preserving legal documents-some allegedly Aksumite-is the Liber Axumae, which documents traditions on Aksum and Aksum Səyon, land rights, and duties towards the church. Written documents are amended by a rich, and often very strictly transmitted oral tradition on genealogies and land rights, poetry, songs and legends which form a rich intangible heritage of Tigray.

In the course of history, many sanctuaries in Tigray were affected by war, especially in the 16th century, when the armies of imam Ahmad b. Ibrahim al-Gazi occupied most of Tigray, destroying churches and monasteries (however, the Aksumite Debre Damo, which offered refuge to atse Lebna Debgəl, stayed unharmed). A great part of the ancient manuscript heritage got lost in that period.

As the home to the oldest Muslim population of Ethiopia, Tigray also possesses Muslim sites (especially the pilgrimage site of Negus; architectural remains in Weger Hariba, and possibly in Maryam Nazret) and inscriptions. In addition, during the 16th century a group of Portuguese soldiers together with Jesuit missionaries founded the settlements of Fəremona, which included a Catholic church. After Catholicism was re-established among a minority by de Jacobis in the 19th century, some new churches were built.

== Rulers of Tigray ==
A "Tigrayan dynasty" in the proper sense never came into existence, the competing dynasties of the respective Tigray provinces being too strong. At times, local provincial rulers managed to establish their rule over most Tigrayan provinces.

Temporarily, the northern provinces were unified under one or two rulers, since at least the 14th century, mainly the Təgre Mäkännən, usually seated in the Hawzen or Adwa area (i.e. Tigray proper), and, further north, the kingdom of Mdre Bahri (bahər nägash), who controlled the trade routes to the Red Sea. Only rarely were its territories united under one man; notable examples being Dejazmach Kəflä Wahəd in the late 16th century, the 17th century ruler Dejazmach Gäbrä Krəstos of Hamassien, in the 18th century Dejazmach Amdä Haymanot, succeeded by the much more powerful Ras Mikael Səhul, and, finally, in the 19th century Atse Yohannes IV and his family members.

The 18th century Regent of Ethiopia Mikael Səhul formed a great Tigray, which after him virtually became a separate kingdom. He was succeeded by Ras Wolde Selassie of Enderta, who ruled Tigray independently in the Zamane mesafent; and he in turn by däggiyat Sabagadis of the shum agame dynasty, whose successor was his son-in-law Wube of the Amharic-speaking Semien. Rulers of Tigrayan provinces were almost always of Tigrayan origin; in this sense, Wube's rule was a new phenomenon and is often perceived in oral tradition as a period of "oppression by an outsider". However, even the rule by Tigrayan princes were often perceived as such by locals, if they did not descend from their local dynasties; this regularly motivated popular support to numerous competing princes (e.g., Kasa Golja against Kasa Mercha, the later Yohannes IV).

There was no strong concept of a "pan-Tigrayan" ethnicity, local identities often being stronger. Some areas never or only rarely submitted to the rule of a Tigrayan overlord, but remained under their autonomous rulers (such as Hamassien and Serae for most of the time, Wajjarat, Zebul, etc.); this was in a way solved by atse Yohannes IV, who due to his descent from all important Tigrayan dynasties could rally support from most Tigrayan regions. After his accession to the imperial throne, Tigray was governed by his uncle Araya Selassie Demsu, who died shortly after Yohannes. Araya successor ras Mengesha Yohannes, the Emperor's son, was only to some degree able to keep Tigray under his control. Atse Menelik II used the situation to partition again Tigray along older borders between several governors, who sent into war against each other immediately after his death (e.g. Gebre Selassie Barya Gabar of Aksum and Sebhat Aregawi of the Agame dynasty).

Later, Tigray was given as a fief to other descendants of Yohannes. Thus the first "Tigrayan" dynasty was created, which, however, depended on support of the Shewan-dominated state. In a brief attempt to exploit Tigrayan discontent with Shewan rule for his power interests, Haile Selassie Gugsa from that dynasty allied with the Italians in the war of 1935–1936 to become ruler of a more autonomous Tigray. This, however, proved to be a political miscalculation. Instead of becoming an autonomous princedom, Tigray was included into Eritrea within Africa Orientale Italiana. Only when the fortune of the Italian occupants changed in World War II, they placed negus Seyoum Mengasha as their governor over Tigray. After the Emperor's return from exile, he was confirmed as a governor (with the title ləul ras), but mainly nominally. His son, ləul ras Mengasha Seyoum, succeeded him in 1960 and was deposed in the Revolution of 1974. After that, he was involved in the formation of the armed Ethiopian Democratic Union in the western lowlands, together with General Iyasu Mengasha.

This "Tigrayan dynasty" strongly relied on Christian symbolism and deducted their legitimacy from their control of Aksum, which hosts the church Aksum Tseyon with the Ark of the Covenant. "Defined by its predominant Christian character, Tigray formed not only a durable component of the Ethiopian nation but was also part of the backbone of the Ethiopian state". The rulership over Tigray (and Ethiopia) was occasionally identified with the rulership over Aksum Tseyon by powerful rulers with connection to Tigray. Consequently, even the term Tseyon (Zion) could be used in exchange with Tigray in specific contexts. Yohannes IV called himself negus tseyon. Creating a sort of spiritual succession, Mikael Ali called himself negus tseyon after his coronation as negus of Tigray in 1914 (he translated it into Arabic as "king of Tigray".

Also the history of titles and ranks in Tigray shows interesting features and reflects the complex local systems of government. Tigray knows a wide variety of ancient state and cultural titles and designations of ranks and offices. Their meaning often differed from the meaning these or similar titles have acquired in territories further south (Amhara). Some are remnants of an ancient administrative system (many of these old titles have vanished today, e.g., the hasgwa and aqqabe sensen of Enderta), others are expressions of local cultural and socio-political structures (e.g., abba gaz; hanta, etc.).
