= Stadio Stefano Lotti =

Football stadium in Poggibonsi, Italy

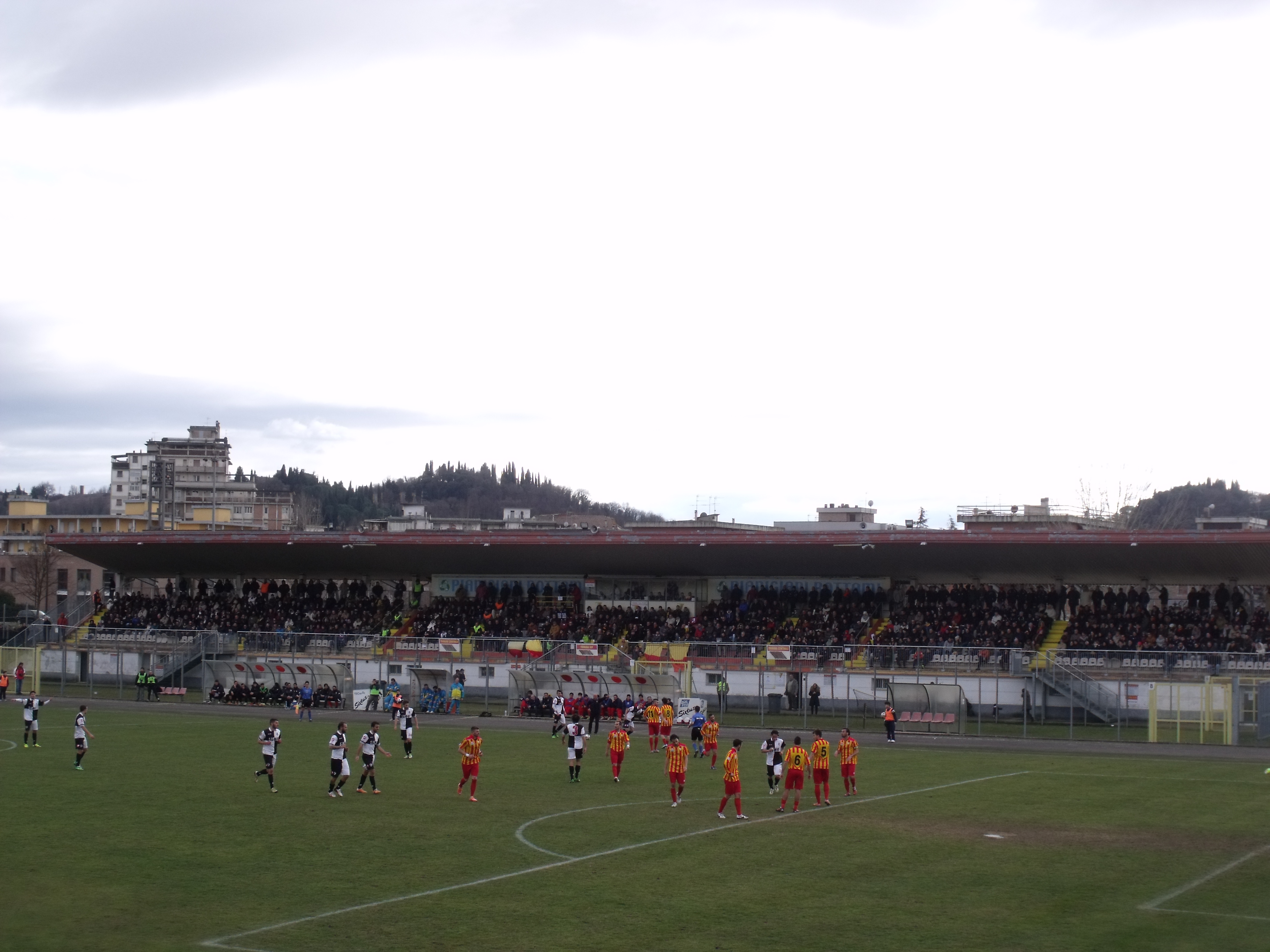
- Interactive map of Stadio Stefano Lotti
- Location: Poggibonsi, Italy
- Coordinates: 43°28′27″N 11°8′48″E
- Owner: Municipality of Poggibonsi
- Capacity: 3600
- Surface: Grass; 105m x 62m

Tenant
- U.S. Poggibonsi (Lega Pro Seconda Divisione)

The Stadio Comunale Stefano Lotti is a football stadium in Poggibonsi, Italy. It is the home of Unione Sportiva Poggibonsi. The Stadium has a full capacity of 3600 and it has 2513 seats, all of which are numbered and divided into six areas.

- VIP forum
- Central tribune
- North side forum
- South side forum
- Stairs local
- Stairs guest

The peloton has dimensions of 105 x 62 meters and is surrounded on the lawn, lighting requirements for a set of Pro League athletics. The stadium is provided with all facilities for government regulations, and is equipped with:

- Emergency Facilities
- Toilets within each sector
- Seating for the handicapped / disabled access
- News Room / Press Center
- Refreshments for local fans and visitors

== See also ==
- Unione Sportiva Poggibonsi
- Football in the Municipality of Poggibonsi
