= Alain Fremura =

Italian footballer (born 2001)

Personal information
- Date of birth: 12 June 2001 (age 25)
- Place of birth: Milan, Italy
- Height: 1.84 m (6 ft 0 in)
- Position: Defender

Team information
- Current team: Poggibonsi

Youth career
- –2020: Livorno

Senior career*
Years	Team	Apps	(Gls)
2020–2021	Livorno	13	(0)
2021	→ Prato (loan)	13	(0)
2021–2023	Follonica Gavorrano	52	(0)
2023	Budoni	10	(0)
2023–2024	Sansepolcro	16	(0)
2024–	Poggibonsi	0	(0)
- * Club domestic league appearances and goals as of 20 December 2023

Alain Fremura (born 12 June 2001) is an Italian footballer who plays as a left-back for Serie D club Poggibonsi

== Club career ==
On 1 February 2021, he joined Serie D club Prato on loan.

On 13 August 2021, he signed with Serie D club Follonica Gavorrano.

== Club statistics ==
=== Club ===
As of 14 July 2020.

Club	Season	League			Cup		Other		Total	
Club	Season	Division	Apps	Goals	Apps	Goals	Apps	Goals	Apps	Goals
Livorno	2019–20	Serie B	1	0	0	0	0	0	1	0
Career total			1	0	0	0	0	0	1	0
