= Francesco Renzi =

Italian footballer (born 2001)

Personal information
- Date of birth: 11 May 2001 (age 25)
- Place of birth: Florence, Italy
- Height: 1.85 m (6 ft 1 in)
- Position: Forward

Team information
- Current team: AC Prato

Youth career
- 2015–2018: Affrico
- 2018–2020: Udinese

Senior career*
Years	Team	Apps	(Gls)
2020–2021	Pistoiese	12	(0)
2021	AC Prato	17	(3)
2022	Poggibonsi	10	(2)
2022–2023	AC Prato	24	(8)
2023-2024	FIU Panthers	8	(2)
2024-	Affrico	?	(?)
- * Club domestic league appearances and goals as of 00:03, 22 Apr 2025 (UTC)

Francesco Renzi (born 11 May 2001) is an Italian professional footballer who plays as a forward for AC Affrico. He is the son of Italian politician Matteo Renzi.
