= Lecchi =

Lecchi is an Italian surname. Notable people with the surname include:

- Alberto Lecchi (born 1954), Argentine film director
- Angelo Lecchi (born 1966), Italian retired racing cyclist
- Giovanni Antonio Lecchi (1702–1776), Italian mathematician, engineer and physicist
- Giuseppe Bernardo Lecchi (1895–1967), Italian violin maker

== See also ==
- Lecchi in Chianti
- Lecchi di Staggia
