= Ethiopia–Kosovo relations =

Ethiopian–Kosovar relations
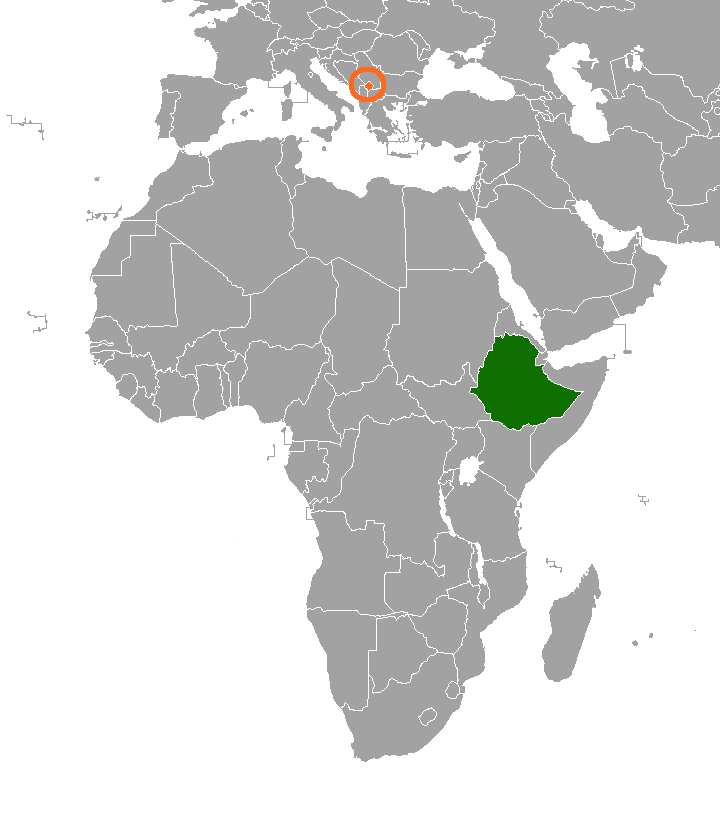

- Ethiopia: Kosovo

Ethiopian–Kosovar relations are foreign relations between Ethiopia and Kosovo. There are no formal diplomatic relations between the two states as Ethiopia has not recognized Kosovo as a sovereign state.

== History ==
At a meeting in January 2009 with Kosovo's Foreign Minister, Skënder Hyseni, Ethiopia's Ambassador to Austria, Kongit Sinegiorgis, stated that the Ethiopian government would come to a decision over the recognition of Kosovo "at the right time".

According to Serbia, Skënder Hyseni, Kosovo's Foreign Minister, and other members of his delegation were denied entry into Ethiopia in January 2010. They allegedly wanted to attend an African Union summit in order to lobby African nations to recognise Kosovo. The Serbian Foreign Minister, Vuk Jeremić, said that their visas were denied after pressure by the Serbian government. Jeremić, who attended the summit, thanked his Ethiopian counterpart for denying the visas and supporting Serbia's cause. However, Kosovo's Foreign Ministry denies that they submitted any requests for visas.

On 5 August 2012 it was reported that the Ethiopian government had formally recognised Kosovo, with Kosovo's Foreign Ministry awaiting the arrival of the note verbale. In December 2014, amid a diplomatic dispute with Serbia, Ethiopia threatened to recognise Kosovo.

== See also ==
- Foreign relations of Ethiopia
- Foreign relations of Kosovo
- Ethiopia–Serbia relations
