= List of monuments in Ethiopia =

This is a comprehensive list of monuments in Ethiopia, organized by region. The monuments listed here are significant for their historical and cultural importance.

== Addis Ababa ==
Name	Built	Location	Coordinates	Image	Comment
Yekatit 12 monument	1955	Sidist Kilo	9.035, 38.761	Yekatit 12 Monument	Commemorates the victims of the 1937 Italian massacre.
Monument to the Lion of Judah	1930	Piazza, Addis Ababa	9.024, 38.747	The Lion of Judah Monumen	Represents the Solomonic dynasty's symbolism.

== Amhara ==
Name	Built	Location	Coordinates	Image	Comment
Debre Berhan Selassie Church	17th century	Gondar	12.6075, 37.473	Debre Berhan Selassie Church	Known for its unique ceiling paintings and religious significance.

== Tigray ==
Name	Built	Location	Coordinates	Image	Comment
Obelisk of Axum	4th century AD	Axum	14.121, 38.724	Obelisk of Axum	An ancient obelisk, one of the oldest structures in Ethiopia, returned from Italy in 2005.

== Oromia ==
Name	Built	Location	Coordinates	Image	Comment
Tiya	12th century	Tiya	8.43, 38.62	Tiya	UNESCO World Heritage Site, famous for its stelae.
