= Yekatit 12 =

1937 massacre of Ethiopians by Italian occupying forces

- Part of the Second Italo–Ethiopian War
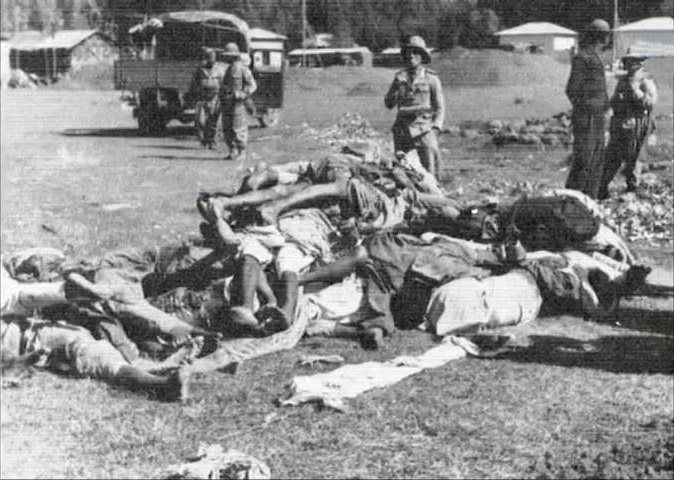
- Ethiopian victims of the Yekatit 12 guarded by Italian soldiers
- Location: 9.043804°N 38.761323°E; Addis Ababa
- Date: 19 February 1937
- Attack type: Massacre, internment, mass murder, summary execution
- Deaths: Estimates range from 1,400 to 30,000 Ethiopian civilians
- Victims: Ethiopian civilians, Ethiopian Arbegnoch
- Perpetrator: Royal Italian Army under Rodolfo Graziani
- Motive: reprisal, anti-Ethiopian sentiment, white supremacy, anti-black racism, colonialism

Yekatit 12 (Amharic: የካቲት ፲፪, romanized: Yekatīt 12), also known in Italy as the Addis Ababa massacre (Italian: Strage di Addis Ababa), is a date in the Ge'ez calendar which refers to the massacre and imprisonment of Ethiopians by the Italian occupation forces following an attempted assassination of Marshal Rodolfo Graziani, Viceroy of Italian East Africa, on 19 February 1937. Graziani had led the Italian forces to victory over the Ethiopians in the Second Italo-Ethiopian War and was supreme governor of Italian East Africa. It has been described as the worst massacre in Ethiopian history.

Estimates vary on the number of people killed in the three days that followed the attempt on Graziani's life. Ethiopian sources claimed the Italians killed 30,000 people, while other estimates typically range between 1,400 and 6,000 deaths; a 2017 study of the massacre stated that approximately 19,200 people were killed, 20 percent of the population of Addis Ababa. Over the following week, numerous Ethiopians suspected of opposing Italian rule were rounded up and executed, including members of the Black Lions and other members of the aristocracy. Emperor Haile Selassie had sent 125 men abroad to receive college education, but most of them were killed. Many more were imprisoned, even collaborators such as Ras Gebre Haywot, the son of Ras Mikael of Wollo, Brehane Markos, and Ayale Gebre, who had helped the Italians identify the two men who made an attempt on Graziani's life.

Following the massacre, Graziani was deposed by Benito Mussolini and replaced by Prince Amedeo, Duke of Aosta.

== Background ==
Following the defeat of the Ethiopian forces under his personal command at the Battle of Maychew on 31 March 1936, Emperor Haile Selassie left Ethiopia to address the League of Nations to plead for their assistance against the Italians. He made his close friend and cousin Ras Imru Haile Selassie his regent during his absence, who attempted to set up a Provisional Government at Gore, in the southwestern part of the country. Gore, however, was located deep in the homeland of the Oromo people, who opposed his attempts to maintain imperial hegemony; some went as far as to approach the British to recognize their attempts to create a Western Galla Confederation. When the Italians advanced on Nekemte on 24 October, Ras Imru found his position untenable and marched south in search of more welcoming surroundings. The two opponents maneuvered over southwestern Ethiopia, the Italians pursuing the Ethiopians, through the month of November until Ras Imru was caught on the banks of the Gojeb River, where after fierce fighting Ras Imru surrendered on 18 December.

Meanwhile, loyalists made a poorly organized attempt to recapture Addis Ababa on 28 July 1936. Various armed groups of Ethiopians attacked the Italian positions in the capital city, taking the defenders by complete surprise; the first Italians they encountered were reportedly a group working on a well. However, General Gariboldi had expected an attack on the capital, and had prepared for this eventuality. Although a unit under Abebe Aragai had almost entered the Little Gebbi, where Graziani was working, the Ethiopians were repulsed on all sides. Despite a last rally by Abune Petros on the final day of the battle, who led a final advance in St George's Square, the attempt on the city failed.

Lastly, the remaining Ethiopian forces in the southeast were being run down. Ras Desta Damtew and Dejazmach Beyene Merid had remained in control of their provincial capitals at Irgalem and Goba through November. On 23 November a motorized column under Captain Tucci had penetrated into the region, sparking a revolt by the local Sidama people; Irgalem fell to the Italians on 1 December, and Ras Desta and Dejazmach Beyene Merid fell back into the mountains of Bale Province. A game of cat-and-mouse followed, until the last few thousand soldiers under their command were cornered near Lake Shala and annihilated by superior Italian numbers at the Battle of Gogetti 18 February 1937. Ras Desta managed to escape the battlefield alone, but was hunted down and executed a few days later. With Ras Desta Damtew's death, all organized Ethiopian resistance to the Italians was spent.

== Attack on Graziani ==
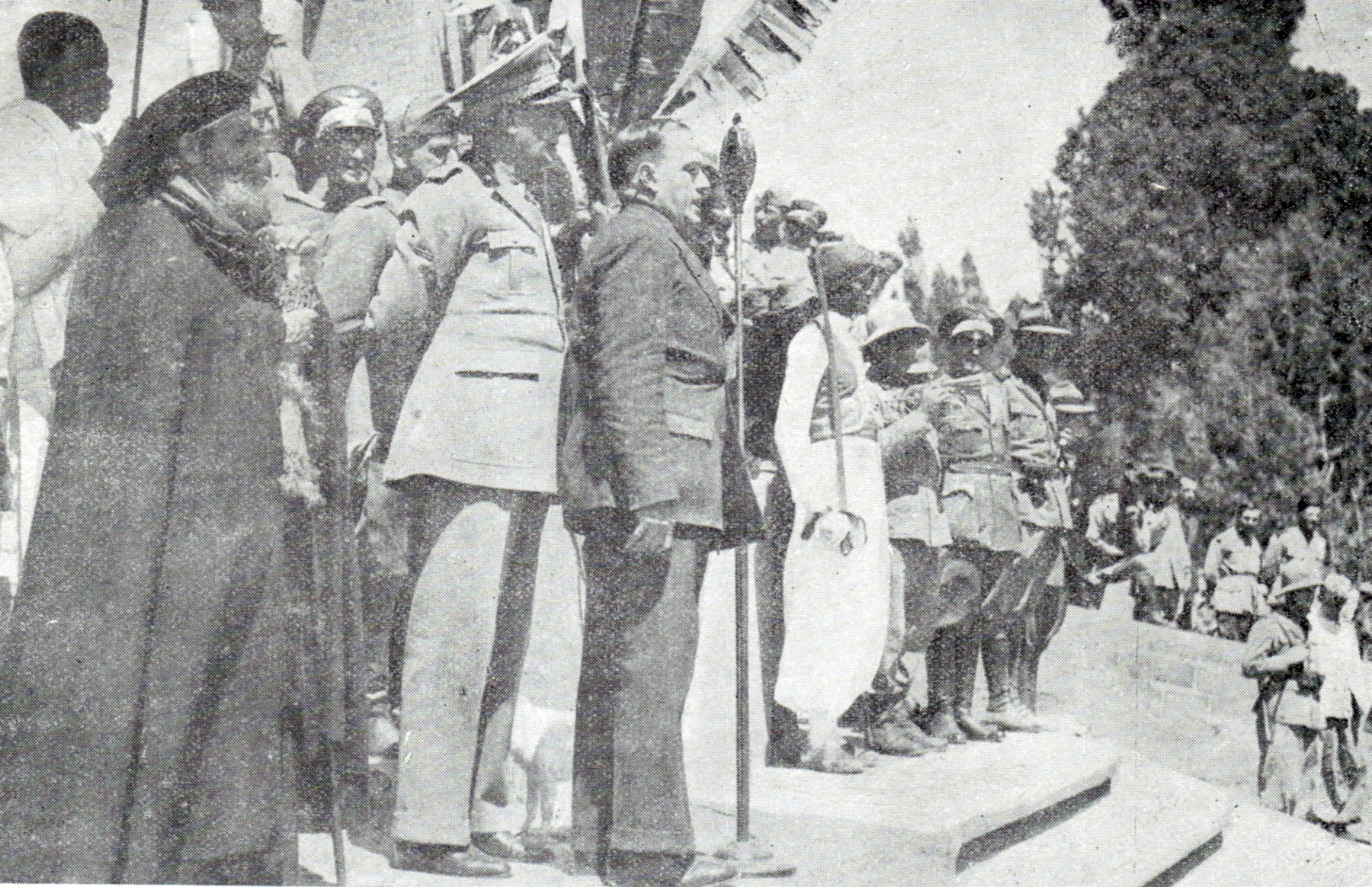
Graziani (second from left, in uniform) shortly before the assassination attempt.

Despite having unquestioned control over the new Italian East Africa at the beginning of February 1937, Graziani still mistrusted its inhabitants. During the previous year, following the capture of Jijiga by his men, he was inspecting an Ethiopian Orthodox church when he fell through a concealed hole in the floor, which he was convinced had been prepared as a mantrap for him. "From that incident," writes Anthony Mockler, "it is possible to date his paranoiac hatred of and suspicion towards the Coptic clergy." Despite this, to celebrate the birth of the Prince of Naples, Graziani announced he would personally distribute alms to the poor on Friday, 19 February, at the Genete Leul Palace (also known as the Little Gebbi).

In the crowd that formed that Friday morning were two young Eritreans living in Ethiopia named Abraha Deboch and Mogus Asgedom. Finding their fortunes limited in the Italian colony, they had come to Ethiopia to enroll in the Menelik II School, where recent events had overtaken them. Apparently accommodating himself to the new administration, Abraha gained employment with the Fascist Political Bureau, where his Eritrean origin, knowledge of Italian, and familiarity with the city made him useful. However, according to Richard Pankhurst, Abraha Deboch was bitterly opposed to the Italians, especially its racist practices. Before leaving their house, Abraha had placed an Italian flag on the wooden floor, driven a bayonet through it, then tied an Ethiopian flag to the bayonet.

The official ceremony began as might be expected. Graziani made a speech, a number of Ethiopian notables made their submission to the victors, Italian planes made a fly-over above the city, and at 11 o'clock officials began distributing the promised alms to priests and the poor.

Abraha and Mogus managed to slip through the crowd to the bottom of the steps to the Little Gebbi, then began throwing grenades. According to one account, they managed to lob 10 of them before escaping in the resulting confusion. According to Richard Pankhurst they were rushed from the scene by a third conspirator, a taxi driver named Simeyon Adefres. Pankhurst also credits him with providing the grenades that Abraha and Mogus threw. It is said that Adefres had managed to procure the grenades from a soldier of the Ethiopian resistance to the Italian colonization whom he had befriended, and that this same soldier, a machine-gunner, taught Abraha and Mogus how to use the grenades.

Behind them, the dead included Abuna Qerellos's umbrella-bearer. The wounded included the Abuna himself, the Vice-Governor General Armando Petretti, General Aurelio Liotta of the Air Force, and the Viceroy himself; one grenade exploded next to him, sending 365 fragments into his body. Graziani was rushed to the Italian hospital where he was operated on immediately, and saved. General Liotta lost his leg to the attack.

For a while Abraha and Mogus hid at the ancient monastery of Debre Libanos but soon moved on, seeking sanctuary in the Anglo-Egyptian Sudan. Somewhere in Gojjam local inhabitants, always suspicious of strangers, murdered them. Adefris returned to Addis Ababa after having driven Abraha and Mogus to the monastery, their first destination, where he remained with them for a week; however, soon after his return to the capital he was arrested by Fascist authorities and tortured to death.

== Reprisals ==
The Italian response was immediate. According to Mockler, "Italian carabinieri had fired into the crowds of beggars and poor assembled for the distribution of alms; and it is said that the Federal Secretary, Guido Cortese, even fired his revolver into the group of Ethiopian dignitaries standing around him." Hours later, Cortese gave the fatal order:

Comrades, today is the day when we should show our devotion to our Viceroy by reacting and destroying the Ethiopians for three days. For three days I give you carte blanche to destroy and kill and do what you want to the Ethiopians.

The attempted murder provided the Italians with the reason to implement Mussolini's order, issued as early as 3 May 1936, for the summary execution of "The Young Ethiopians", a small group of intellectuals who had received college education from American and European colleges. The same day as the assassination, a military tribunal was set up, and by nightfall, 62 Ethiopians were tried and shot at the Alem Bekagn prison in Addis Ababa. "The Graziani Massacre marked the almost total liquidation of the intellectual component of the Resistance," writes Bahru Zewde.

For the rest of that day, through Saturday and Sunday, Italians killed Ethiopians with daggers and truncheons to the shouts of "Duce! Duce!" and "Civiltà Italiana!" They doused native houses with petrol and set them on fire. They broke into the homes of local Greeks and Armenians and killed their servants. Some even posed on the corpses of their victims to have their photographs taken. In three days, the Italians had killed between 1,400 and 30,000 Ethiopians in Addis Ababa alone. The first day has been commemorated as "Yekatit 12" (Ethiopian 19 February) by Ethiopians ever since.

Thousands of Ethiopians of all classes were sent to Danane Concentration Camp at Danan in the Ogaden and Nocra prison camp in Nokra in the Dahlak Archipelago. Conditions at Danan were inhospitable, and Graziani had given orders that the prisoners would receive only the bare minimum of food and water. As Sbacchi notes, "Poor facilities, including latrines, the humid climate, malaria, stomach infections, and venereal disease took many lives, especially among those compelled to work on the irrigation canal or on the banana and sugar-cane plantations." An estimated half of prisoners died at Danan.

Conditions at Nokra were even worse than at Danan, according to Sbacchi. The detainees sent there joined 500 prisoners serving life sentences for serious political crimes, increasing the total number incarcerated to 1,500. The inmates suffered from lack of fresh water, sunstroke, marsh fever, and dysentery.

The final reprisal struck in May. Investigators found that Abraha and Mogus had stayed a while at Debra Libanos, and slight circumstantial evidence suggested that the monks had foreknowledge of their plans. Graziani, mindful of his misadventure at Jijiga, believed that they were complicit and on the 19th of May, cabled the local commander: "Therefore execute summarily all monks without distinction including the Vice-Prior." The following day, on the feast day of their patron saint Tekle Haymanot, according to the records of the Italian fascists, 297 monks plus 23 laymen were shot, the entire population of the monastery; other sources estimate the death toll at 1,200 to 2,000. Another 360 survivors from the massacre, among which 30 school children, were also deported to Danane.

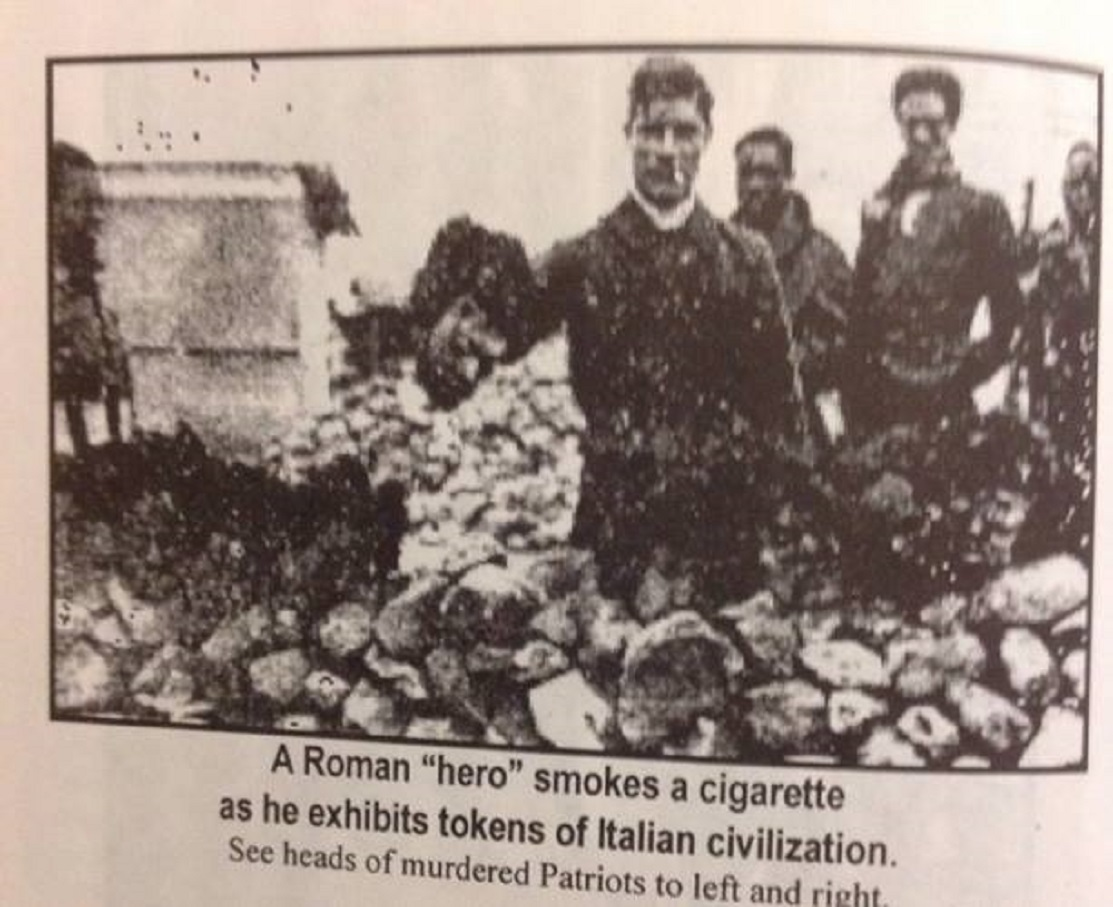
Beheading of an Ethiopian

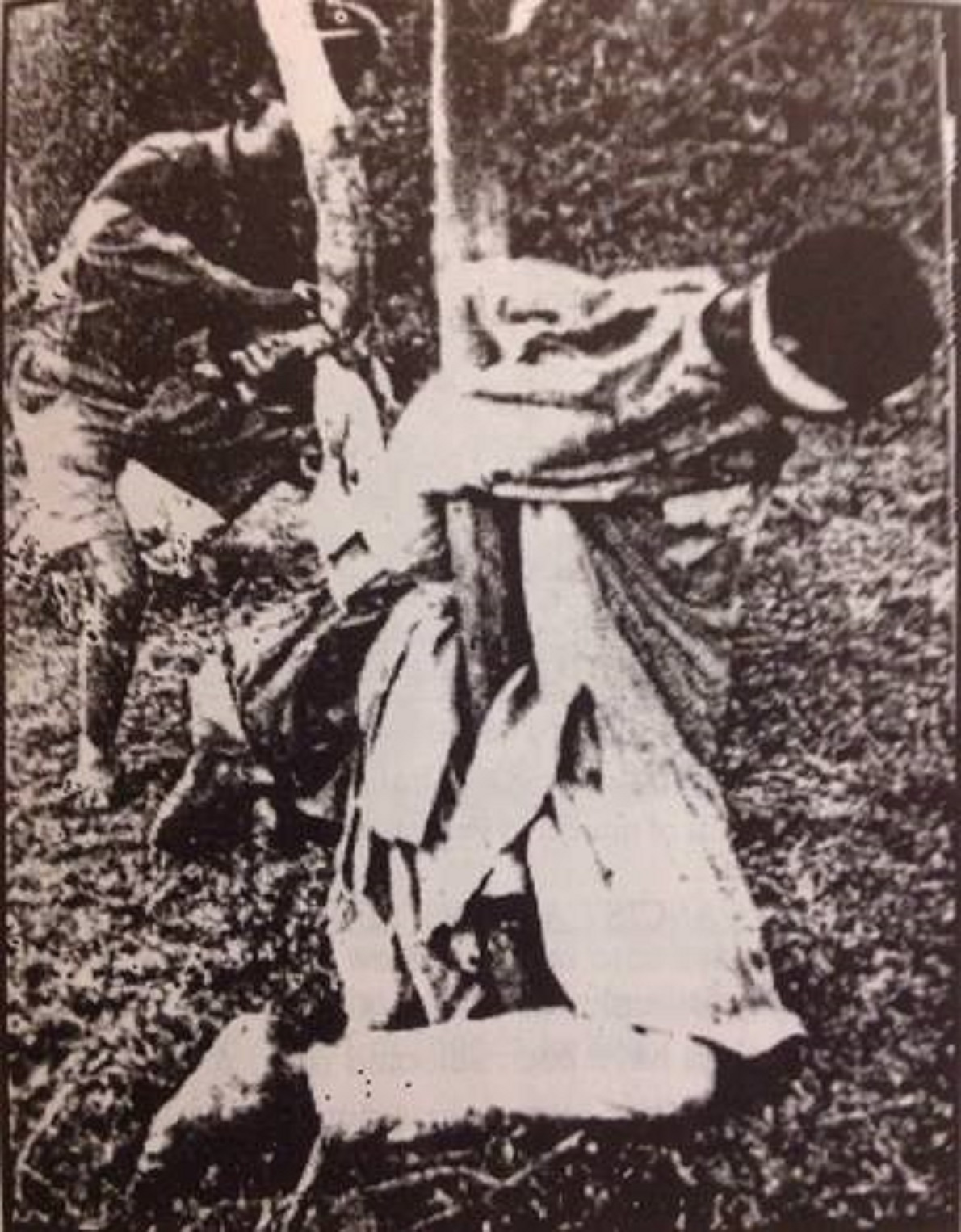
A victim tied to a tree

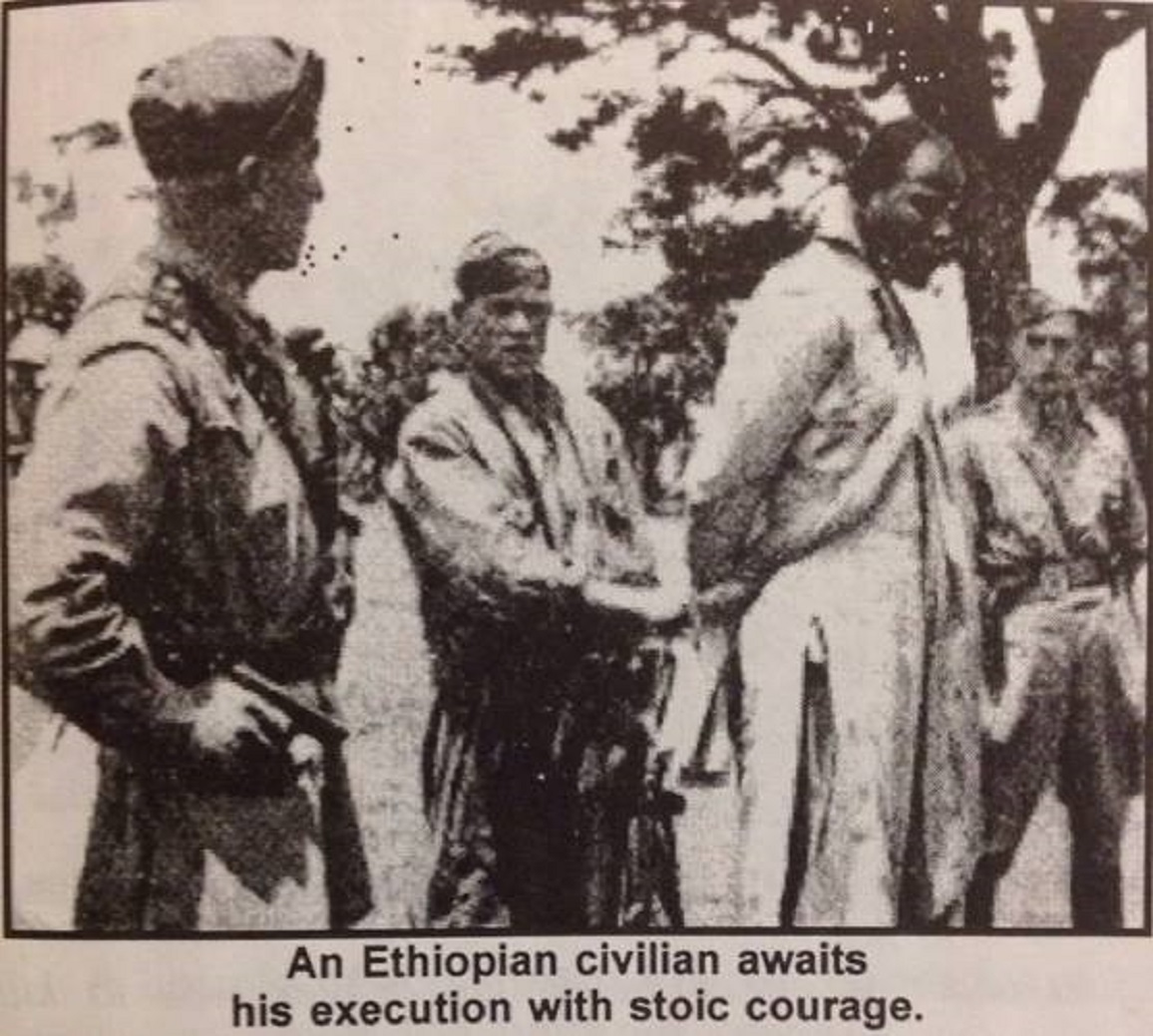
An Ethiopian about to be hanged

=== Casualties ===
Estimates vary on the number of people killed in the massacre. Ethiopian sources claimed that 30,000 people were killed, while French and American newspapers provided figures ranging between 1,400 and 6,000 deaths. Historian Angelo Del Boca and British author Anthony Mockler estimated 3,000 deaths. A 2017 history of the massacre by Ian L. Campbell estimated that 19,200 people were killed.

== Commemoration ==
On 2 November 1944, a commemorative monument was inaugurated in Sidist Kilo Square (also called Yekatit 12 square) in Addis Ababa by Ethiopian Emperor Haile Selassie. Since Haile Selassie, including under the Derg, commemorations have been made at the monument every year on the 19th of February.

Ethiopia annually commemorates the victims of the massacre. On 22 February 2023, to coincide with the commemoration of the 86th anniversary of the Yekatit 12 massacre, the United States Embassy in Addis Ababa held a ceremonial reopening of the restored "American Gibbi" building, where the U.S. Chargé d'Affaires Cornelius Van H. Engert sheltered 700 Ethiopians fleeing the violence, thereby saving their lives. In Italy, in October 2006, a Memorial Day for the African victims was proposed, but it was not established due to the fall of the Prodi II Cabinet.

== See also ==
- Yekatit 12 Square
