= Santuario del Romituzzo, Poggibonsi =

Roman Catholic oratory/sanctuary church in Tuscany, Italy

The Santuario del Romituzzo (Sanctuary of the Romituzzo) is a 15th-century Roman Catholic oratory/sanctuary church built just outside of the town of Poggibonsi, region of Tuscany, Italy.

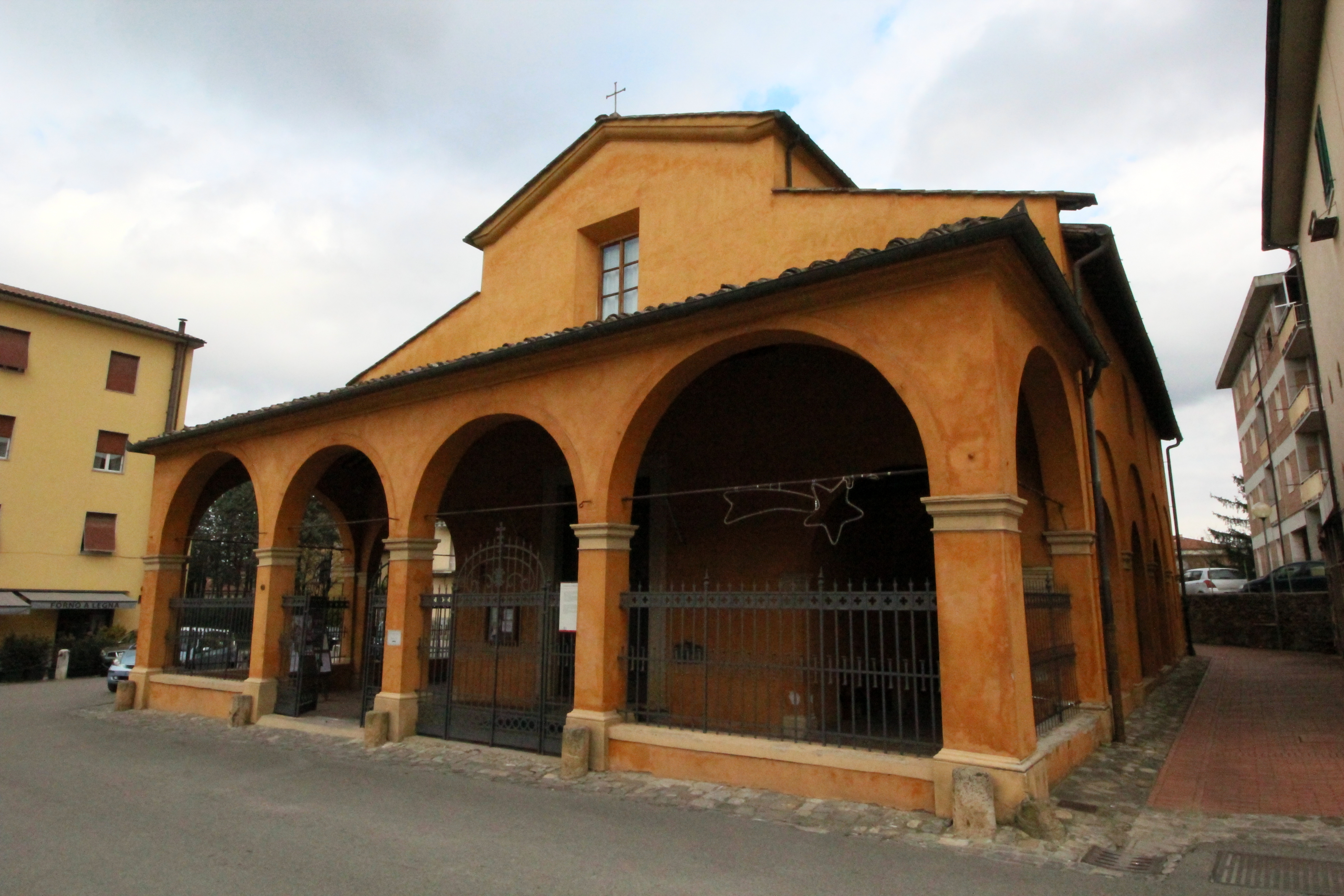
Exterior of the Santuario del Romituzzo

== History ==
The sanctuary gained its name from eremitic cells (romitaggio) likely located here in prior to the 14th century. A tabernacle built at the site by the 15th century had acquired an icon of the Madonna and Child, depicting the veneration known as the Madonna della Neve (Madonna of the Snows) as painted by an unknown Sienese School artist. Legend holds the icon was found outside after a late spring snowfall.

As veneration of the image increased, in 1460, Antonio Adimari, feudal lord of a nearby castle at Strozzavolpe erected an oratory with a loggia. In 1550, a church was erected, with a campanile by 1570. The fresco of the Pietà (1571) fresco by Jacopo dei Caldori in the sacristy, and the crucifix over the main altar were commissioned in 1571. In the 17th century, while the sanctuary was in decline, it continued to be officiated by Augustinian priests from the local church of San Lorenzo and the Franciscans from San Lucchese.

In 1682, bishop of Colle Val d'Elsa allowed the oratory to melt some of the silver ex voto offerings to make the chandelier (1707) above the main altar. In 1788, the administration of the sanctuary, due to irregularities was linked to the church of Sant Maria Assunta di Poggibonsi, to which it was linked until 1967. Restorations occurred in the 20th century, specially after damage during World War II.
