= Aurelio Liotta =

Italian Air Force general

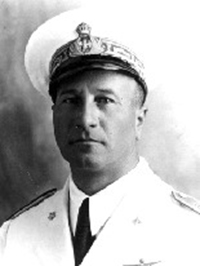
- Born: 10 November 1886; Sant'Agata di Militello, Kingdom of Italy
- Died: 26 March 1948 (aged 61); Messina, Italy
- Military career
- Allegiance: Kingdom of Italy
- Branch: Royal Italian Army; Regia Aeronautica
- Rank: Air Fleet General (air marshal)
- Commands: 1st Fighter Group; 2nd Air Group; 3rd Territorial Air Zone; Italian East Africa Air Force Command; Special Air Services Command
- Conflicts: Italo-Turkish War; World War I; Italian Front; Albanian Front; Vlora War; Second Italo-Ethiopian War; World War II
- Awards: Gold Medal of Military Valor; Silver Medal of Military Valor (twice); War Merit Cross; Military Order of Savoy; Order of the Crown of Italy; Colonial Order of the Star of Italy; Order of Saints Maurice and Lazarus; Legion of Honour

Aurelio Liotta (Sant'Agata di Militello, 10 November 1886 – Messina, 26 March 1948) was an Italian Air Force general during the interwar period and World War II.

== Biography ==
Born into an aristocratic family, he was initially directed by his parents towards religious studies, but preferred the military life. Moving to Modena, he enrolled at the local military academy on 5 November 1906, specializing in the aeronautical field, and graduating as a second lieutenant on 4 September 1908, assigned to the 8th Bersaglieri Regiment. He was promoted to lieutenant on 4 September 1911, and shortly thereafter was sent to Libya during the Italo-Turkish War, arriving in Homs on 23 November. He was repatriated on 23 October 1912, and moved his residence to Rome; on 1 June 1913 he was assigned to a bicycle battalion, which was deployed on the front following Italy's entry into the First World War in May 1915.

On 6 July 1915 he was promoted to captain, and in January 1916 he was admitted at his request to the pilot school at the Cascina Costa airfield in Samarate, joining the Aviator Schools Battalion and obtaining his pilot license in Busto Arsizio in February 1916. From June 1916 he trained at Malpensa airfield on Caproni aircraft; from July 31 he temporarily became commander of the training airfield of Cameri, and from 20 June 1917 of the one in Venaria Reale. He was promoted to major on 16 August 1917, after a period as an instructor, and returned to action as commander of the 8th Air Group from 27 August 1918, and then of the 116th Squadron, both stationed in Albania, until 15 January 1920. On 1 June 1920 he returned to Vlore as commander of the Italian air force in Albania until 20 August, earning a Silver Medal of Military Valor, and from 10 April 1921 he was transferred to the Air Force Corps, assigned to the 9th Reconnaissance Airplane Group.

On 4 September 1921 he was again transferred to the 1st Fighter Group, becoming its interim commander from 24 September until 18 February 1923, when he attended the specialization course at the Central School in Civitavecchia. On 31 March he became commander of the 2nd Air Group, and on 16 October 1923 joined the newly established Regia Aeronautica with the rank of lieutenant colonel. From 1 February 1926 he held various posts in the general staff; on 21 July 1927 he became Colonel (wing commander) and from 24 September 1931 Air Brigade General (air commodore). On 3 October he became Inspector of the General Aviation Squadrons and from 24 September 1932 Chief of Staff of the 3rd Territorial Air Zone (Z.A.T.), of which he assumed command on 15 October 1933, being promoted to Air Division General (air vice marshal) on 30 October. On February 17, 1936, he was promoted to Air Fleet General (air marshal) and on August 20 he was transferred to the Ministry of Aeronautics, supervising the construction of new air bases and being appointed extraordinary commissioner of the Royal Italian Air Club.

On December 19, 1936, he assumed command of the Italian East African Air Force Command, personally taking part in air raids against Ethiopian guerrillas, for which he was awarded another silver medal of military valor. On 19 February 1937, General Liotta was standing next to Viceroy Rodolfo Graziani during a speech in Addis Ababa, when the latter was targeted with a failed assassination attempt. The attackers threw several hand grenades at Graziani and the men standing around him, killing seven and wounding over fifty; Liotta was among the most seriously wounded, losing his right eye and a leg. He was awarded a Gold Medal of Military Valor for having shielded Graziani with his body.

After recovering from his wounds, on 4 April 1938 Liotta was appointed military aeronautical attaché at the Italian Embassy in Berlin, where he met Elena Steiman, whom he married. On 5 April 1939 he was made a Senator of the Kingdom of Italy. After the outbreak of the Second World War he resumed service at the head of the Special Air Service Command, until 1941, when he retired from active service due to reaching age limits. After the end of the war, he was stripped of the title of Senator by the High Court of Justice for Sanctions against Fascism. He died in Messina on 26 March 1948.
