= Militia Templi =

Lay order of the Roman Catholic Church

Militia Templi Christi Pauperum Militum Ordo
- Formation: 21 September 1979; 47 years ago
- Type: Roman Catholic private association
- Headquarters: Castello della Magione; Poggibonsi, Italy; 43°27′28″N 11°9′29″E
- Grand Master: Dom. Andrea Conti (second Grand Master, elected in March 2025)
- Website: www.ordo-militiae-templi.org

The Militia Templi (English: Militia of the Temple), also called the Order of the Poor Knights of Christ (Latin: Christi Pauperum Militum Ordo), is a lay order of the Roman Catholic Church.

== Overview ==
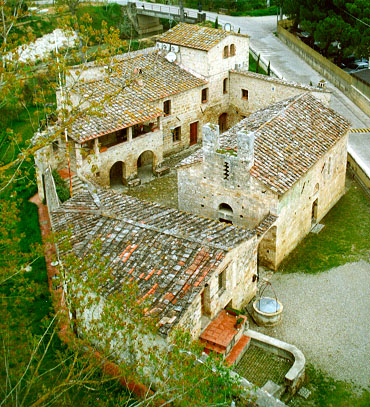
The Castello della Magione in Poggibonsi, built in the Eleventh Century, is the headquarters of the Militia Templi. It now consists of a church, the residence of the Grand Master, offices and guest rooms.

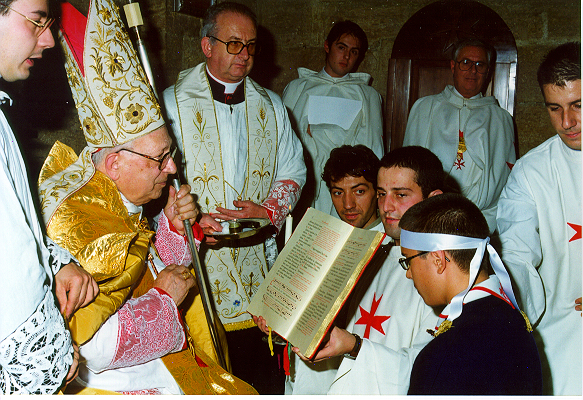
Cardinal Antonio Innocenti during the Confirmation in the old rite in the Magistral Church. (At the left of the Cardinal is monsignore Luigi Piovanelli, belonging to the Archdiocese of Siena and Prelate of the Militia Templi; to his left is Chancellor dom. Andrea Cappelli and the founder and first Grand Master, Count Cristofani).

The Militia Templi is a Catholic private association of the faithful that celebrates its liturgy according to the traditional form in place in 1962, often referred to as the Tridentine Mass.

Founded by the Italian Count Marcello Alberto Cristofani della Magione under the authority of the Catholic Archdiocese of Siena-Colle di Val d'Elsa-Montalcino, the Militia Templi's focus is knightly and monastic and members follow a modern adaptation of the Rule written by St. Bernard of Clairvaux for the medieval Knights Templar. The order makes no claims of direct descent from the old Knights Templar and holds that, when made, such self-styled claims are both historically and canonically false.

The Militia was formed civilly and with the approval of the local ordinary on September 21, 1979. Its constitutions were approved on Sept. 8, 1988 by the Archbishop of Siena Mario Jsmaele Castellano. The next Archbishop, Gaetano Bonicelli approved the Rule of the Militia in 1990. The Cardinal Protectors of the Militia Templi were Silvio Oddi, Édouard Gagnon and Alfons Maria Stickler. The current Protector is the Right Reverend Phillip Lawrence, OSB, Abbot of the Benedictine Monastery of Christ in the Desert located in New Mexico, USA.

According to its constitutions, the Militia has both married and celibate members. Professed Knights consecrate themselves perpetually to the Militia with the investiture and the promise to observe the three classic evangelical counsels as well as the public testimony of faith (fourth promise). The knights engage in different apostolates organized at the Preceptory and commandry level, each Knight is required to provide some type of service to the Church. They are obliged to live by their Rule and recite daily the Hours of the traditional Divine Office, do at least of quarter of an hour of mental prayer a day, go to confession monthly, make several annual retreats, have a spiritual director, engage in an apostolate, and perform the Ignatian exercises every 2 years. Their members include several hundred Knights, 10 national preceptories, many local priorates and scout groups.

== Magistral See ==
The order's Magistral See, or headquarters, is situated in the Castello della Magione. It is a former Templar compound that lies in the village of Poggibonsi in the Tuscany region of Italy. Built in the 11th century, the castle was donated by its owners; Gottifredo di Arnolfo and Arnolfino di Cristofano to the monks of the Saint Michael Abbey in Poggio Marturi who later bestowed it to the Templars for use as one of their numerous "Mansiones" or "Domus Templi" along the Via Francigena. After 1312 the Castello della Magione passed through many hands, including the Hospitallers and the Princess Corsini, until, in 1979 it was purchased by Count Marcello Alberto Cristofani della Magione, the founder and first Grand Master of the Militia Templi. Attached to the castle is a church, also restored, with impressive Burgundian-Cistercian influence and is used daily by the order for the community recitation of Vespers and the celebration of the Tridentine Mass.

== Symbol and habit ==
The symbol of the Militiae Templi is a red eight-pointed ("octagonal") cross, symbol of the Eight Beatitudes of the Gospel, while the symbol is a white flag with red octagonal cross. The cross is not to be confused with that of the medieval Knights Hospitaller, which is known as the Maltese Cross. The habit of the Professed Knights is white and consists of a tunic, a scapular with cowl and the octagonal red cross on the chest, and a mantle with the same cross on the left shoulder. Ladies wear a white mantle and a white veil with a donat's cross (without the top section). Chaplains are dressed with a white Mozzetta with red edge, red buttons and an octagonal red cross on the left front part. The Oblati (Knights and Ladies of Devotion) have a gray mantle with the red octagonal cross on the left shoulder.

== Spread in the world ==
The Militia Templi through Preceptories or Magistral Legations, is currently present in the following countries: Italy, United Kingdom, Ireland, Spain, United States of America, Puerto Rico, and Hungary.

The current Grand Master, successor of the founder, is dom. Andrea Conti, elected in March 2025.

== Bibliography ==
- Ordine della Milizia del Tempio, Regola dei poveri Cavalieri di Cristo, Cancelleria Magistrale della Milizia del Tempio, Poggibonsi (Siena) 1992;
- Ordine della Milizia del Tempio, Sviluppo e Criteri di Sviluppo, Cancelleria Magistrale della Milizia del Tempio, Poggibonsi (Siena) 2006;
- AA.VV., I Templari: Mito e Storia. Atti del Convegno internazionale di studi della Magione Templare di Poggibonsi - Siena, 29-31 maggio 1987, Viti-Riccucci, Sinalunga (Siena) 1989;
- Giuseppe Mantelli, La Magione casa templare sulla via Francigena, La Magione dei Templari, Poggibonsi (Siena) 1990;
- Giancarlo Rocca, La restaurazione dei templari, in Guerrino Pelliccia e G. Rocca (diretto da), Dizionario degli Istituti di Perfezione, vol. IX, Paoline, Roma 1997, coll. 903–905;
- AA.VV., Kèter èv szerzetessège, vol. II, Dinasztia, Budapest 1998, pp. 1279-1282;
- Isidoro Palumbo (a cura di), La Milizia del Tempio, p.i.p., Bologna, 1990;
- Jens Bargmann, Der "Uncommon Sense": Die Templer als neue geistliche Bewegung?, in Michael Hochschild, Die Zukunft geistlicher Bewegungen, Lit Verlag, Zuerich, 2016, S. 155–165.

== See also ==
- Castello della Magione
- Knights Templar
- Via Francigena
- Tridentine Mass
- Traditionalist Catholic
