= Africa Hall =

Headquarter of the United Nations Economic Commission for Africa in Addis Ababa, Ethiopia

- View of the 1975 addition

- Location within Ethiopia

General information
- Type: Conference centre, offices
- Architectural style: Modernism
- Location: Addis Ababa, Ethiopia
- Coordinates: 9.0147°N 38.7620°E
- Elevation: 7,726 feet (2,355 m)
- Current tenants: UNECA
- Construction started: August 1959
- Completed: February 1961
- Renovated: 2014-2024
- Client: Government of Ethiopia

Height
- Top floor: 7

Technical details
- Floor area: 205,000 m^{2}

Design and construction
- Architect: Arturo Mezzedimi
- Main contractor: Varnero Construction plc

Africa Hall is the permanent headquarters of the United Nations Economic Commission for Africa (UNECA) based in Addis Ababa, Ethiopia. The structure, built in the span of only 18 months, was completed in February 1961. It covers an overall area of 75,000 m^{2}, with a usable area of 13,800 m^{2}, consisting of 3,600 m^{2} of conference halls, 5,500 m^{2} of offices and 4,700 m^{2} of general facilities. Its main characteristic is represented by the "continuous spaces" of the internal layout. Ten years later, in 1971, work was commenced on a project funded by the United Nations to extend the structure, which was completed in 1975. It consists of a block of 800 new offices, a 6-storey building to house the huge library and other buildings for general facilities. This extension work added a further 130,000 m^{2}.

Along with the Addis Ababa City Hall, Africa Hall was one of the two projects designed to demonstrate, in the words of Emperor Haile Selassie, “that it is possible to construct grand buildings here too [in Ethiopia], by erecting a couple of high-profile structures. It is not their complexity or size that matter, but the maximum possible use of home-produced materials, in order to shake our wealthy middle class (which keeps its money under the mattress) from the inactivity that also binds it in the field of construction, and stimulate it to invest its assets also in building to make this ‘great village’ a city and a true great capital”.

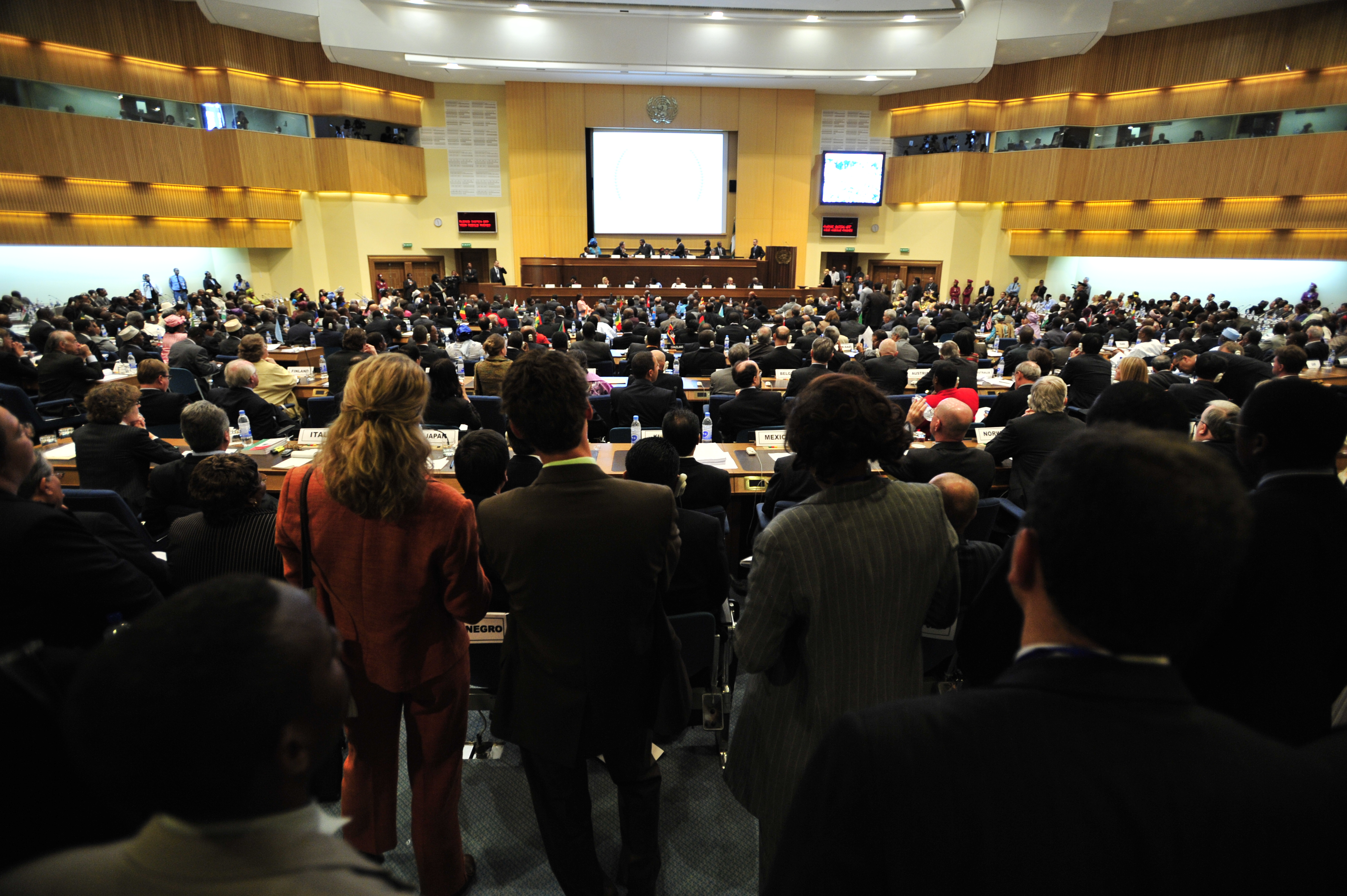
African leaders and foreign diplomats in the Plenary Hall of the UNCC, during the 12th African Union summit in 2009

It was here, in this conference center, that the African Union's predecessor, the Organization of African Unity (OAU) was founded on 25 May 1963. Also in this building is Afewerk Tekle's most famous work, Total Liberation of Africa, a 150 m^{2} stained glass triptych. The work depicts images symbolizing African nations uniting to tackle poverty and disease. Also designed by Afework Tekle are the geometric design surrounding the central window, reminiscent of patterns of traditional shema clothing, which was added after the original design of the building to commemorate a construction worker that died during its construction.

== United Nations Conference Centre ==
The United Nations Conference Centre (UNCC) has two main conference halls offering a combined space of 2,000 m^{2} with a total capability of hosting close to 1300 participants. The main hall can host completely separate events or be linked electronically for a fully coordinated conference. In addition to the two main halls, the United Nations Conference Centre also has four additional conference rooms with a capacity for citing up to 115 people each. There are also ten caucus rooms used for break out sessions that can seat between 22 and 32 people: and two briefing rooms with a seating capacity of 44 and 64 people.

Building was designed and works supervised by Studio Valle Progettazioni, headquartered in Rome.

== Refurbishment and recognition ==
The building was extensively refurbished between 2014 and 2024. In 2026, it was awarded the World Monuments Fund/Knoll Modernism Prize, the first African building to win the award.
