= Luchesius Modestini =

Blessed Luchesius of Poggibonsi, TOSF
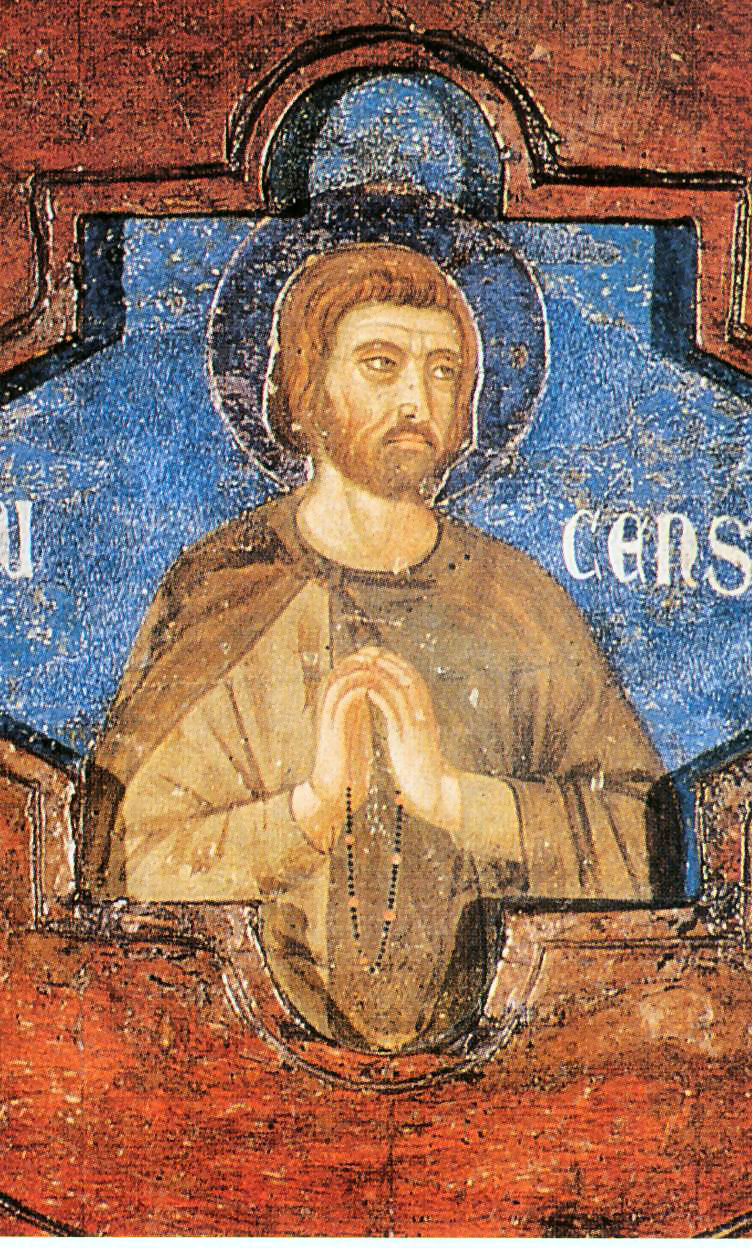

The first Franciscan tertiary
- Born: ca 1180; Gaggiano, March of Tuscany, Holy Roman Empire
- Died: April 28, 1260; Poggibonsi, March of Tuscany, Holy Roman Empire
- Venerated in: Roman Catholic Church
- Beatified: 1274 (cultus approved) by Pope Gregory X
- Major shrine: Poggibonsi, Siena, Italy
- Feast: April 28

Luchesius Modestini, TOSF (also Luchesio, Lucchese, Lucesio, Lucio, or Luchesius of Poggibonsi) (c. 1180 - 1260) is honored by tradition within the Franciscan Order as being, along with his wife, Buonadonna de' Segni, the first members of the Franciscan Order of Penance, most commonly referred to as the Third Order of St. Francis.

Many miracles are claimed to have occurred at Modestini's shrine in the Franciscan church at Poggibonsi. Pope Gregory X approved his beatification in 1274.

== Life ==
=== Soldier and merchant ===
Modestini was born in the area around Poggibonsi, which had been declared an imperial city in that period by Frederick II, Holy Roman Emperor. According to some accounts Modestini was born in the small village of Gaggiano, which lay on the major road between Poggibonsi and Castellina in Chianti. He was born around 1180-1182, making him a contemporary of Francis of Assisi. According to some accounts, as a young man he served in the Ghibelline army.

Whilst stationed in Poggibonsi, which was prospering economically, he abandoned his military career and married a young woman of the city, Buona de' Segni—traditionally called Buonadonna. He then became a merchant, serving the many pilgrims who would travel along the road on which Poggibonsi lay. His biographers state that, more than most merchants, he was so entirely and solely concerned with material success that he was generally reputed to be avaricious, as was his wife.

=== Conversion ===
At some point Modestini had a moment of conversion and realized how foolish it was only to strive for worldly goods. He began to practice works of mercy and to perform his religious obligations faithfully. He put on the gray tunic or religious habit of a penitent, rapidly advancing in holiness, often fasting on bread and water, sleeping on a hard floor or performing other ascetic austerities.

His wife joined him in this faith-inspired life, giving them the option of separating and each entering a religious order. This was an ancient and respectable way for husbands and wives to develop their spiritual aspirations, commonly practiced by married couples who felt a deep desire to follow God. Possibly on Francis' recommendation they chose to continue living as a couple. In this they revived a way of sanctity for married couples. Modestini gave up his business, as they had no family or children to care for and he feared that by returning to it he might relapse into covetousness. He and his wife divided everything among the poor and only retained enough land to support themselves - Modestini tilled this with his own hands and gave any surplus they did not need to the hungry.

=== Meeting Francis ===
About this time Francis came to Poggibonsi, where the town had given his friars a church and a house. After he preached a sermon on penance, many people desired to leave everything and to follow his way of life, but instead Francis instructed them to persevere in their existing vocations as he soon intended to give them a guide by which they could serve God perfectly whilst remaining in the world and not entering the religious life.

Francis had become acquainted with Modestini through earlier business transactions, whilst Modestini had already heard about Francis' activities. Francis met him whilst in Poggibonsi, greatly rejoicing to find this avaricious man so changed and Modestini asked for special instructions for himself and his wife, so that they might lead a life in the world that would be pleasing to God. Francis then explained to them his plans to establish an Order for lay people living in the spirit he preached; Luchesius and Buonadonna asked to be received into it at once. Thus, according to tradition, they became the first members of the Franciscan Order of Penance, which later came to be called the Third Order of St. Francis.

If Luchesius and Buonadonna were really the first Tertiaries (members of a Third Order), they must have become so not long after Francis founded his First Order in 1209. The first simple rule of life, which St. Francis gave to the first tertiaries at that time, was supplanted in 1221 by one in legal wording by Cardinal Ugolino , approved verbally later the same the same year by Pope Honorius III. For this reason 1221 is often given as the foundation date for the Third Order of Saint Francis.

=== Death ===
When Modestini lay very ill, with no hope of recovery, his wife said to him "Implore God, who gave us to each other as companions in life, to permit us also to die together". Luchesius prayed as requested and Segni fell ill with a fever, from which she died before her husband after devoutly receiving the Holy Sacraments. They thus died together on 28 April 1260.

== Hagiography ==
According to legend, Modestini's generosity to the poor knew no bounds, so that one day there was not even a loaf of bread for his own household. When yet another poor man came, he asked his wife to see if there was not something they could find for him. That vexed her and she scolded him severely; his mortifications, she said, had made him almost crazy and that his continued giving would leave them both hungry. Modestini asked her gently to look in the pantry, for he trusted that Christ, who had multiplied loaves to bread to feed thousands, would provide all that the sick needed.

When he did not have enough to supply all those who asked him, he begged for more from others on behalf of the distressed. Once he carried home a disabled man who he had found by the road. A frivolous young man met him, and asked him mockingly "What poor devil is that you are carrying on your back?". Modestini replied calmly "I am carrying my Lord Jesus Christ". At once the young man's face became distorted, he cried out loudly, and was dumb. He repented, falling on his knees in front of Modestini, who restored his speech to him by making the Sign of the Cross.
