= Talciona =

- Frazione
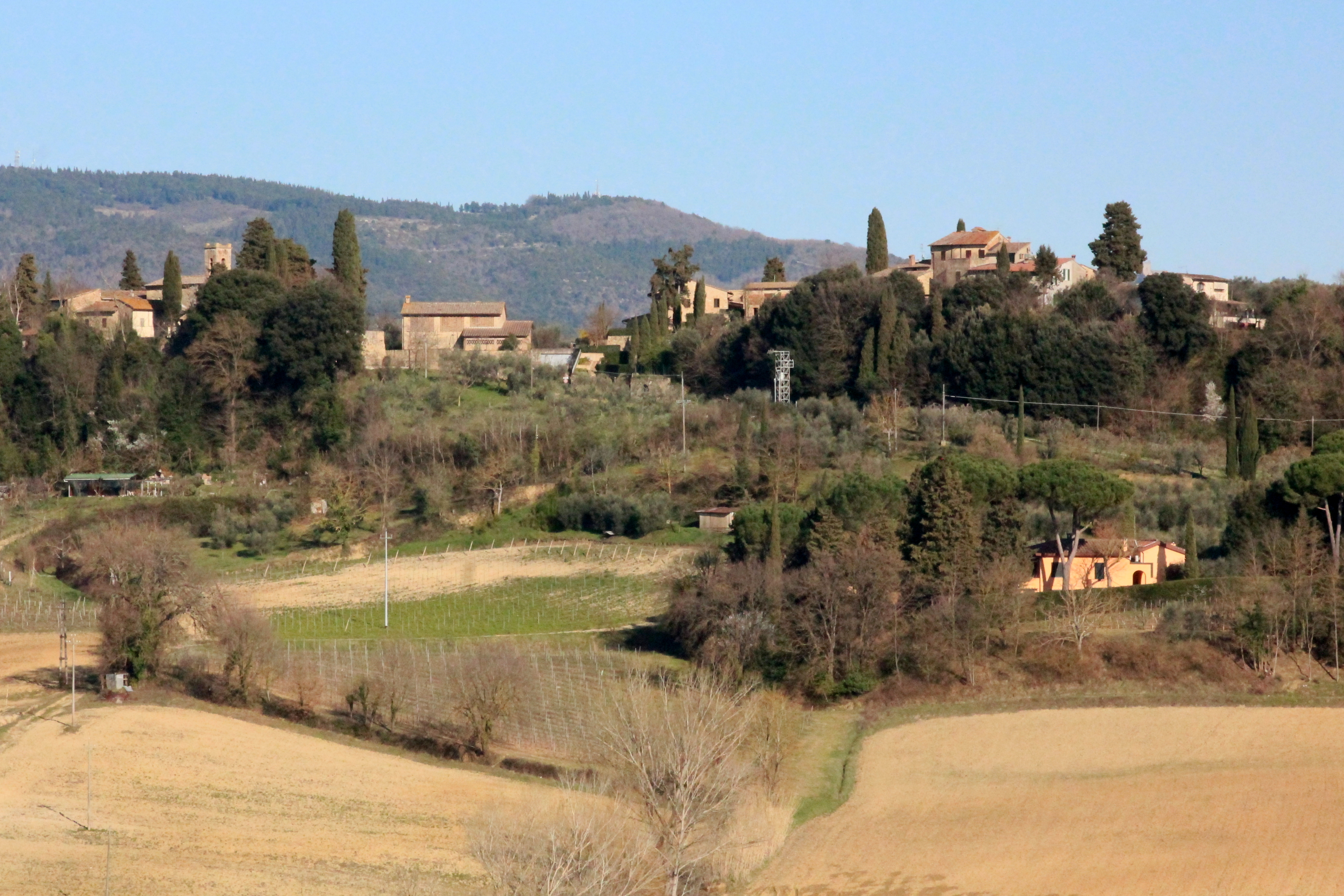
- View of Talciona

- Location of Talciona in Italy
- Coordinates: 43°27′51″N 11°11′23″E
- Country: Italy
- Region: Tuscany
- Province: Siena (SI)
- Comune: Poggibonsi
- Elevation: 238 m (781 ft)

Population (2011)
  - Total: 59
- Time zone: UTC+1 (CET)
  - Summer (DST): UTC+2 (CEST)

Talciona is a village in Tuscany, central Italy, in the comune of Poggibonsi, province of Siena. At the time of the 2001 census its population was 43.

Talciona is about 35 km from Siena and 6 km from Poggibonsi.
