= Ian L. Campbell =

American historian

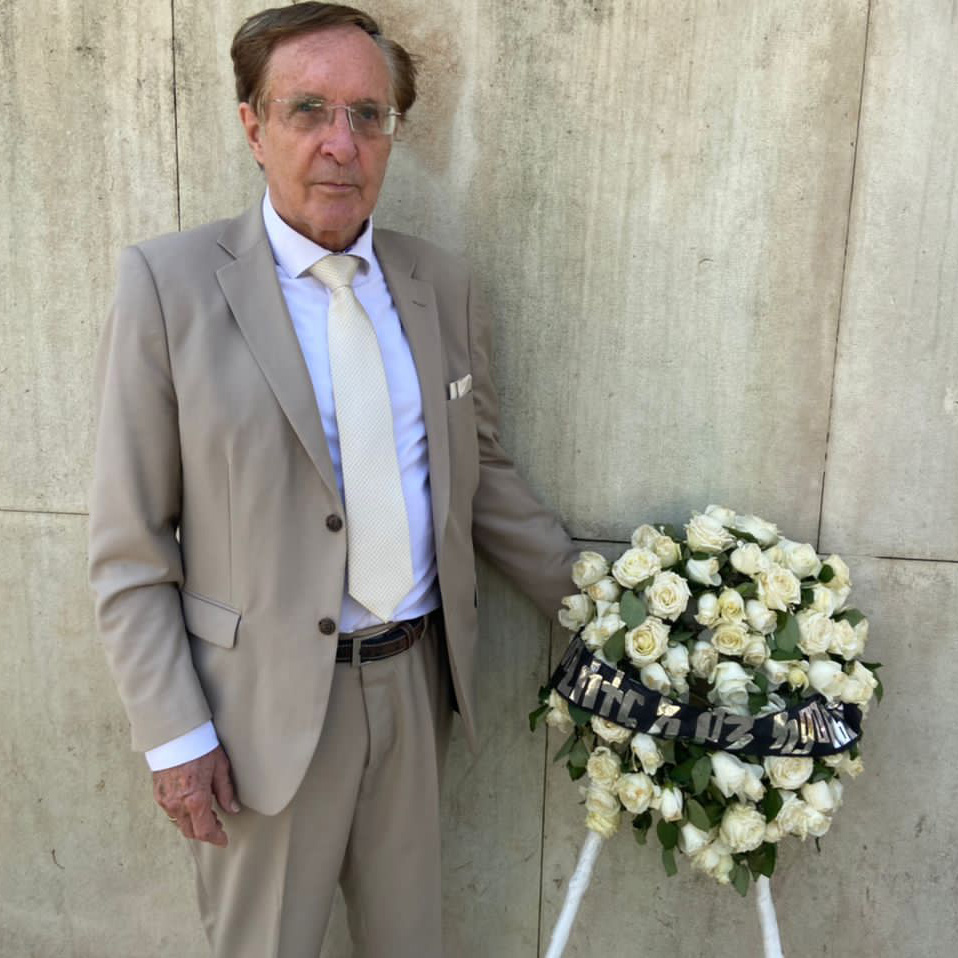
Ian Campbell laying Wreath at the Martyrs Monument, Addis Ababa, at the commemoration of the Yekatit 12 massacre, 19 February 2022

Ian Leslie Campbell (born 22 February 1945) is a British historian specialising in Ethiopia with a focus on the Italian occupation of Ethiopia. During his career, he worked together with Ethiopianist Richard Pankhurst.

His first book on Italian colonialism in Ethiopia is The Plot to Kill Graziani (Addis Ababa University Press in 2010), an analysis of the assassination attempt on Rodolfo Graziani that took place on 19 February 1937. The Plot to Kill Graziani was declared Ethiopian Book of the Year by Richard Pankhurst, presented by the Ethiopian Broadcasting Corporation, and featured in Eland's travel series, Ethiopia Through Writers' Eyes.

His second book, The Massacre of Debre Libanos (AAU Press, 2014), reports the massacre of members of the Ethiopian Coptic Church in the monastery village of Debre Libanos in Italian East Africa between 21 and 29 May 1937. Campbell's findings were featured in the Italian documentaries Debre Libanos and If Only I Were That Warrior.

His third book is The Addis Ababa Massacre (Hurst, London & Oxford University Press, New York, 2017), an account of the atrocities following the attack on Rodolfo Graziani referred to as Yekatit 12. The book got recognition from a spectrum of international reviewers, and in 2018 became available in an Italian edition, Il massacro di Addis Abeba (Rizzoli, 2018), raising a debate in Italy about the responsibilities of Italian colonialism.

In 2022 Campbell published Holy War: The Untold Story of Catholic Italy's Crusade Against the Ethiopian Orthodox Church (Hurst). In the book Campbell uncovers the involvement of the Italian Catholic Church in facilitating Mussolini's invasion of Ethiopia, highlighting the complicity of key figures within the Vatican hierarchy, including Pope Pius XI, Secretary of State Eugenio Pacelli (who would later become Pius XII), and the archbishop of Milan Alfredo Ildefonso Schuster. The work was named one of the best book of 2002 by the American 'Foreign Affairs' and obtained wide acclaim from a range of global critics.

== Bibliography ==
- La repressione fascista in Etiopia: la riconstruzione del massacro di Debra Libanos, with Degife Gabre-Tsadik, in Studi Piacentini: Rivista dell’Istituto storico della Resistenza e dell’età contemporanea, Ed. Prof. Del Boca, A., No. 21, 1997, Piacenza, Italy, pp. 79–128.
- La Repressione Fascista in Ethiopia: Il Massacro Segreto di Engecha, in Studi Piacentini: Rivista dell’Istituto storico della Resistenza e dll’età contemporanea, Ed. Prof. Del Boca, A., No. 24-25, 1998–1999, pp. 23–46
- "The 'bïrïllé' man of Harer: the contribution of Arthur Rimbaud to the evolution of a uniquely Ethiopian drinking-vessel". Annales d'Éthiopie. 26: 179–205. OCLC 830398934
- "Yekatit 12 revisited: new light on the strike against Graziani". Journal of Ethiopian studies. 40: 1–2. OCLC 780319409
- Ethiopia 1937: The Plot to Kill Graziani – The Attempted Assassination of Mussolini’s Viceroy, Addis Ababa University Press, 2010, reprinted 2015, ISBN 978-99944-52-34-7
- The Massacre of Debre Libanos, Ethiopia 1937: The Story of One of Fascism’s Most Shocking Atrocities, Addis Ababa University Press, 2014, ISBN 978-99944-52-51-4
- The Addis Ababa Massacre – Italy’s National Shame, London: Hurst Publishers and New York: Oxford University Press, 2017, hardback ISBN 9781849046923, paperback 2019, ISBN 9781787382237
- Il Massacro di Addis Abeba – Una Vergogna Italiana – Rizzoli, Milan, 2018, ISBN 978-88-17-10182-0
- Holy War: The Untold Story of Catholic Italy's Crusade Against the Ethiopian Orthodox Church - Hurst & Company, London, 2021, ISBN 9781787384774
