= Ethiopia–Yugoslavia relations =

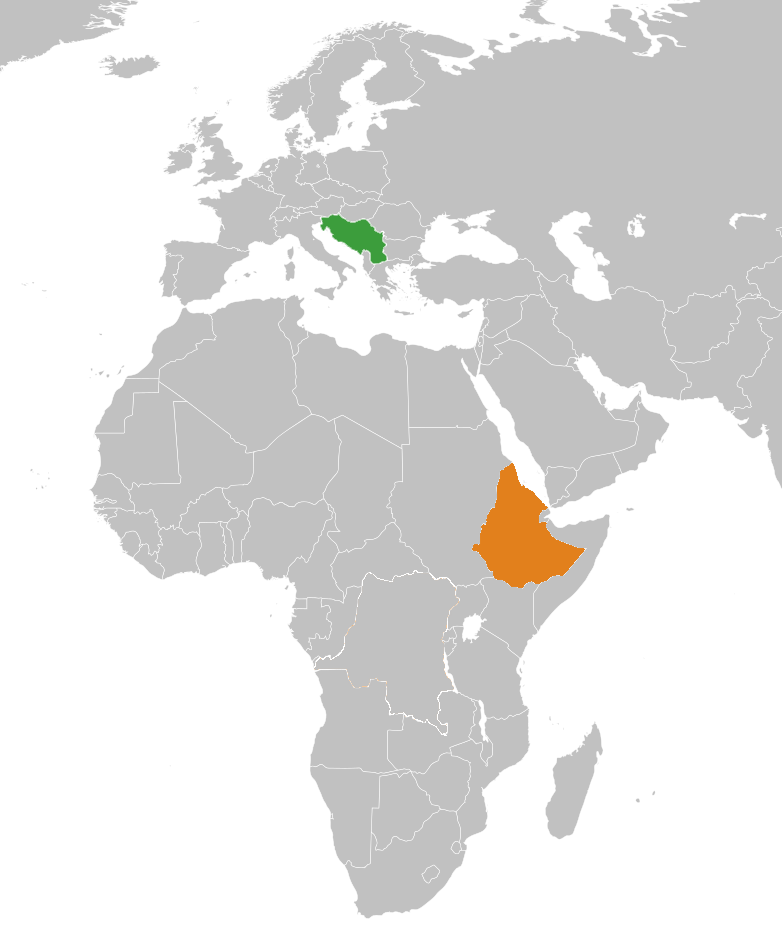

- Yugoslavia: Ethiopia

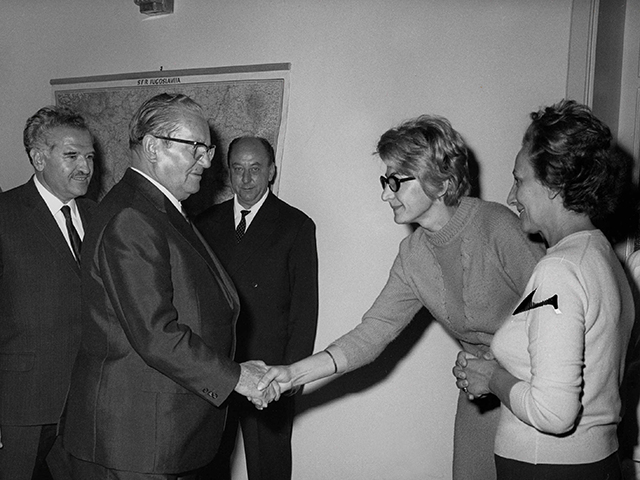
President Tito meeting Yugoslav representatives in the Embassy of Yugoslavia in Addis Ababa in 1970.

Ethiopia–Yugoslavia relations were historical bilateral relations between Ethiopia and the now split-up Socialist Federal Republic of Yugoslavia. Both countries were amongst the founding members of the Non-Aligned Movement. Diplomatic contact was first established between the two countries at the United Nations in 1947, when Yugoslavia supported Ethiopian claims to Eritrea (the end of the British Military Administration and the establishment of the Federation of Ethiopia and Eritrea) and Ethiopia supported Yugoslav claims over the Free Territory of Trieste. After the 1948 Tito-Stalin split, Yugoslavia turned increasingly focused on the countries outside of the bloc, resulting in the two countries opening embassies in 1955. The formal diplomatic relations were already established in 1952. Emperor Haile Selassie was the first African head of state in official visit to Yugoslavia in 1954.

During Tito's visit to Ethiopia in 1970, as a part of his tour to Tanzania, Zambia, Ethiopia, Kenya, Sudan, United Arab Republic and Libya, the Yugoslav president and the Ethiopian emperor discussed mutual aims within the Non-Aligned Movement and expressed satisfaction with the end of the Nigerian Civil War, in whose resolution the Organisation of African Unity played a prominent and positive role. Following the overthrow of the Ethiopian Empire and the Emperor Haile Selassie in a coup d'état on 12 September 1974 and during the subsequent Ethiopian Civil War, Belgrade moved quickly to support the new Ethiopian authorities, in an effort to prevent strong involvement by USSR, which would initiate its own support only after 1977. With the initiation of the Soviet support, the USA increased pressure on Belgrade to stop Yugoslav transfers to the Mengistu regime, which Washington perceived as being in direct breach of the 1951 Mutual Defense Aid Program, ultimately leading to the waning of Yugoslavia's influence in Ethiopia.

== Cultural exchange ==
The two countries ratified their program of cultural collaboration in 1965. Yugoslav exhibition of frescoes copies from the Our Lady of Ljeviš Serbian Orthodox church was sent to Addis Ababa in 1967. In 1977 Belgrade organized another exhibition of Yugoslav photography in Addis Ababa with over 100 exhibits represented the period of the National Liberation War and Socialist Revolution during the World War II in Yugoslavia.

In February 1988 weekly magazine Mladina from SR Slovenia published a report on Yugoslav hypocrisy in Ethiopia stating that country's military-industrial complex was trying to resolve Yugoslavia's economic crisis by selling weapons under the pretense of non-aligned solidarity to a country where more than 5 million people had already died from hunger. A week later they called Yugoslav Defense Secretary Branko Mamula a “merchant of death”.

== List of bilateral state visits ==
=== Yugoslav visits to Ethiopia ===
- 11-24 December 1955: Josip Broz Tito-Yekatit 12 monument
- 2-12 February 1959: Josip Broz Tito
- 27 January-4 February 1968: Josip Broz Tito
- 9-11 February 1970: Josip Broz Tito

=== Ethiopian visits to Yugoslavia ===
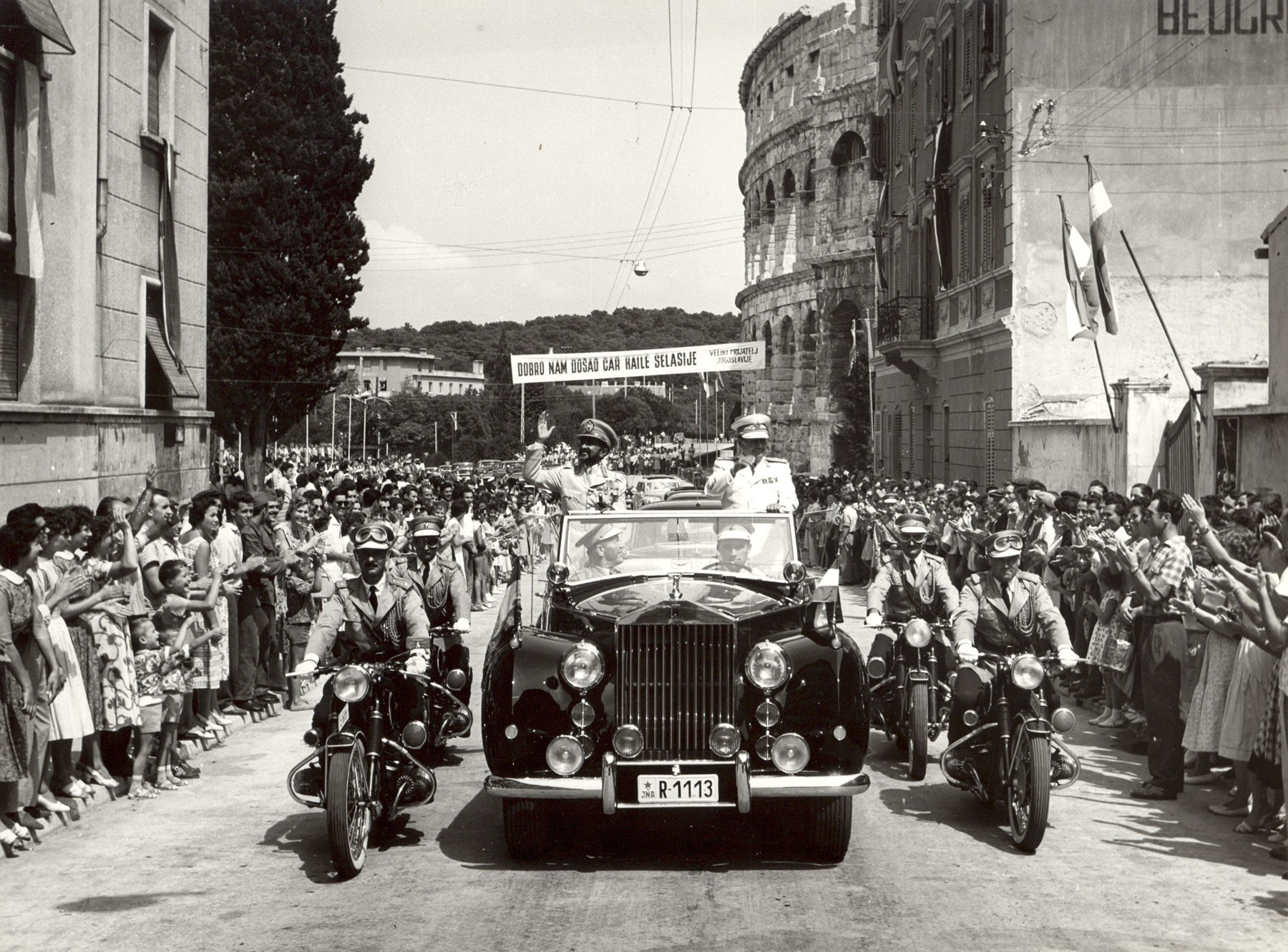
President of Yugoslavia Josip Broz Tito and Emperor Haile Selassie in Pula in SR Croatia.

- 20-26 July 1954: Haile Selassie
- 15-24 August 1959: Haile Selassie
- 2-4 November 1963: Haile Selassie
- 29 September 1964: Haile Selassie
- 26-27 October 1966: Haile Selassie
- 4-5 July 1967: Haile Selassie
- 23-25 September 1968: Haile Selassie
- 25-30 June 1972: Haile Selassie
- 30-31 October 1973: Haile Selassie
- 7-10 December 1978: Mengistu Haile Mariam

== See also ==
- Yugoslavia and the Non-Aligned Movement
- Yugoslavia and the Organisation of African Unity
- Ethiopia–Serbia relations
- Museum of African Art, Belgrade
- Archives of Yugoslavia
- Yekatit 12 monument
- Italian Ethiopia
  - Italian Eritrea
- Invasion of Yugoslavia
  - Italian governorate of Montenegro
  - Italian protectorate of Albania (1939–1943) (including parts of Yugoslavia)
- Death and state funeral of Josip Broz Tito
