= Afewerk Tekle =

Ethiopian artist (1932–2012)

Laureate Afewerk Tekle
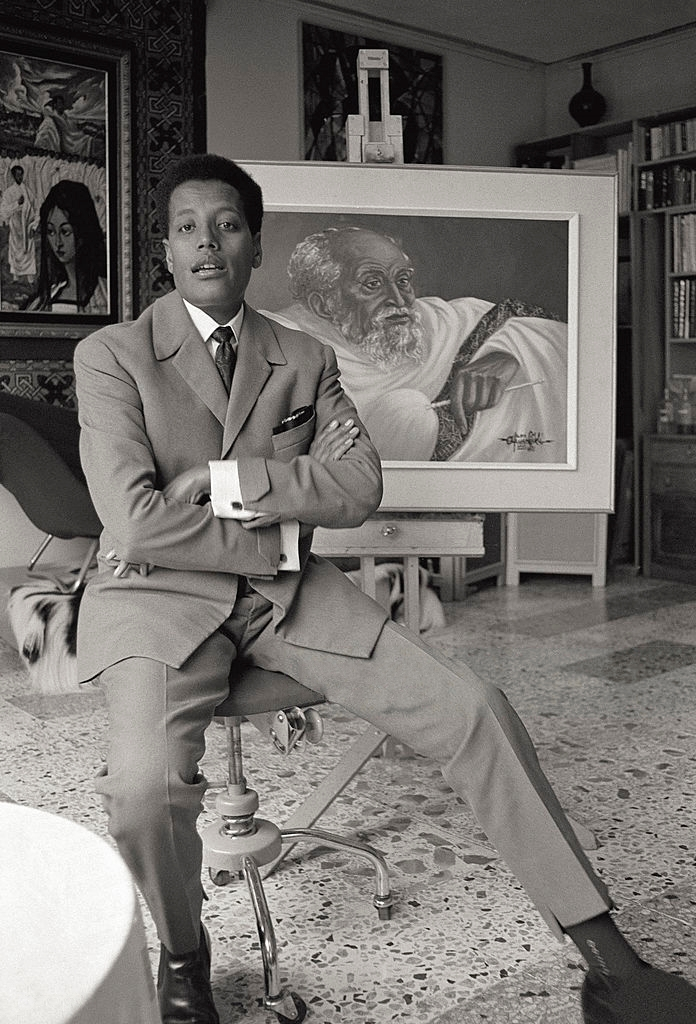
- Afewerk in his studio in Addis Ababa, Ethiopia, 1965
- Born: 22 October 1932; Ankober, Shewa Province, Ethiopian Empire
- Died: 10 April 2012 (aged 79); Addis Ababa, Ethiopia
- Education: Central School of Arts and Crafts; Slade School of Art
- Known for: Painting, sculpture

Afewerk Tekle (Amharic: አፈወርቅ ተክሌ; 22 October 1932 – 10 April 2012) was an Ethiopian artist, particularly known for his paintings on African and Christian themes as well as his stained glass.

== Early life and career ==
Born in Ankober, in Shewa Province, to ethnic Amhara parents Feleketch Yamatawork and Tekle Mamo, Afework grew up under the Italian occupation during the Second World War. Following the war in 1947, Afewerk decided that he wanted to help rebuild Ethiopia and elected to travel to England to study mining engineering. Before departing, Afewerk, together with other students leaving to study overseas, was addressed by Emperor Haile Selassie. Afewerk recalls being told "you must work hard, and when you come back do not tell us what tall buildings you saw in Europe, or what wide streets they have, but make sure you return equipped with the skills and the mindset to rebuild Ethiopia".

Afewerk had already shown talent as an artist as a child, decorating several walls in his home town. Whilst at Leighton Park School, a boarding school in England, this talent was recognised and encouraged by his teachers. As a result, Afewerk was persuaded to switch from engineering and enroll in Central School of Arts and Crafts in London. He then went on to the Slade School of Art where he studied painting, sculpture and architecture.

Returning to Ethiopia as a university graduate, Afewerk could have accepted an assigned ministerial post, but instead decided to spend time travelling around the provinces of Ethiopia to get more experience of his native country and culture, which he reflected in his paintings. In 1954, he held his first one-man show in Addis Ababa, at Municipality Hall, that gave him the funds to travel around Europe for two years where he learnt how to design and construct stained glass windows. He also made a special study on Ethiopian illustrated manuscripts in the British Library, the Bibliothèque Nationale in Paris and the Vatican Library.

Back in Ethiopia, Afewerk opened a studio in the National Library of Ethiopia. His growing recognition lead to government commissions for murals and mosaics in St George's Cathedral, Addis Ababa/Ethiopia and several of his designs were used on the national stamps. He was also commissioned to produce sculptures of famous Ethiopians, although only the monumental statue of Ras Makonnen in Harrar was completed. Most notably, in 1958 he designed Total Liberation of Africa, a stained glass piece in the Africa Hall of the United Nations Economic Commission for Africa in Addis Ababa. The three windows cover an area of 150 square meters, and represent the sorrow of Africa's past, the struggle of the present, and hope for Africa's future.

In 1961, Afewerk held a major retrospective in Addis Ababa, which led to his painting Maskal Flower being shown at international exhibitions in Russia, the United States and Senegal. Increasing funds allowed Afewerk to travel around the continent of Africa. With much of Africa still emerging from colonialism, Afewerk became fired with black emancipation and the struggles for independence. This is reflected in his paintings of this time, with titles like Backbones of African Civilization and African Unity.

In 1964, he became the first laureate of the Haile Selassie I Prize for Fine Arts. As his reputation spread abroad, Afewerk was invited to put on an exhibition in Moscow following which he toured the Soviet Union giving lectures. The American government responded with an invitation for one man exhibitions in Washington, D.C., and New York and a similar lecture tour of American universities. Additional international exhibitions followed in Senegal, Turkey, Zaire, the United Arab Republic, Bulgaria, Munich, Kenya and Algeria.

Through much of the 1970s, Afewerk was engaged in producing murals and mosaics for many public and religious buildings around Ethiopia, including the mural Last Judgement in the Adigrat Cathedral in Adigrat, Tigray. In 1977, his painting Unity Triptych won the gold medal in the Algiers International Festival.

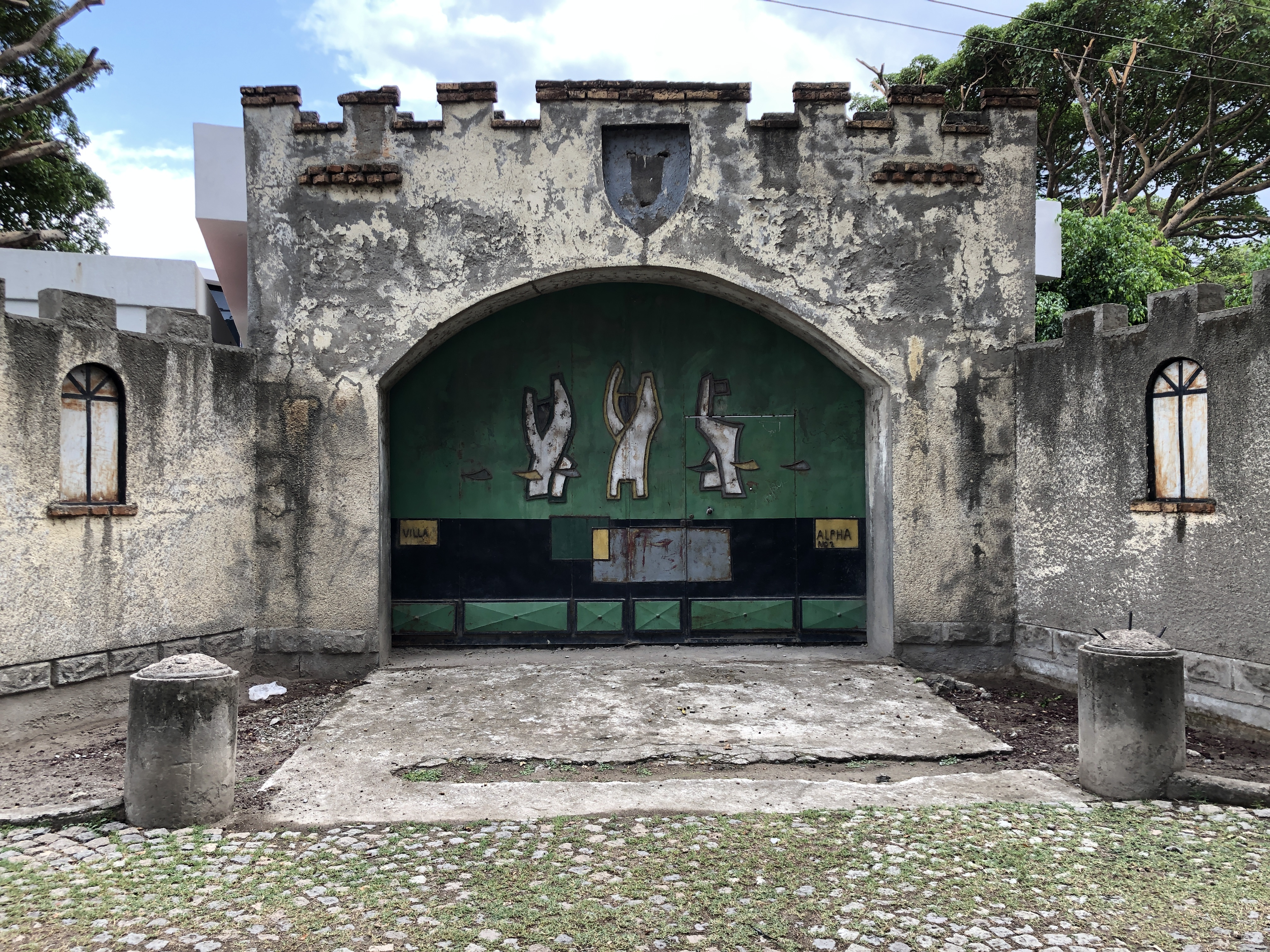
Gate of Villa Alpha No. 2, the residence of the Ethiopian artist Afewerk Tekle in Awassa

The early 1980s saw a second major exhibition in Moscow and an exhibition in Bonn. In 1981, his painting Self-portrait was the first work by an African artist to enter the permanent collection of the Uffizi Gallery, Florence, Italy.

In 1997, he exhibited at the Biennale of Aquitaine, France, winning first prize in the international competition. He was also nominated as the Laureate of the Biennale which gave him membership of the French International Academy of Arts.

Afewerk Tekle had membership of the Russian Academy of Arts, so he became the first African member in 1983. He lived in Addis Ababa but had a second residence in Hawassa in the Sidama Region close to Lake Hawassa.

== Death ==
Afewerk Tekle died on 10 April 2012 from severe stomach ulcer complications after receiving treatment at a private hospital in Addis Ababa and was buried at the cemetery of the Holy Trinity Cathedral in Addis Ababa. Afewerk's death received wide media coverage in the country, with a national committee-arranged funeral.

== Notable works ==
- Ras Mekonnen Monument
- Altar cross (1959) at Royal Chapel in the Tower of London, England
- Murals and paintings at St George's Cathedral (Addis Ababa)
- Maskal Flower (1961)
- Total Liberation of Africa (1961) in Africa Hall, Addis Ababa
- The Last Judgment (1970) mural in Adigrat Cathedral, Tigray
- The victory of Ethiopia (1979) at the Hero Centre in Debre Zeyit
- The Chalice and the Cross in the Life of the African People (1997) study for stained glass entered in the Biennale of Aquitaine
