= Bellavista, Poggibonsi =

Bellavista
- Frazione
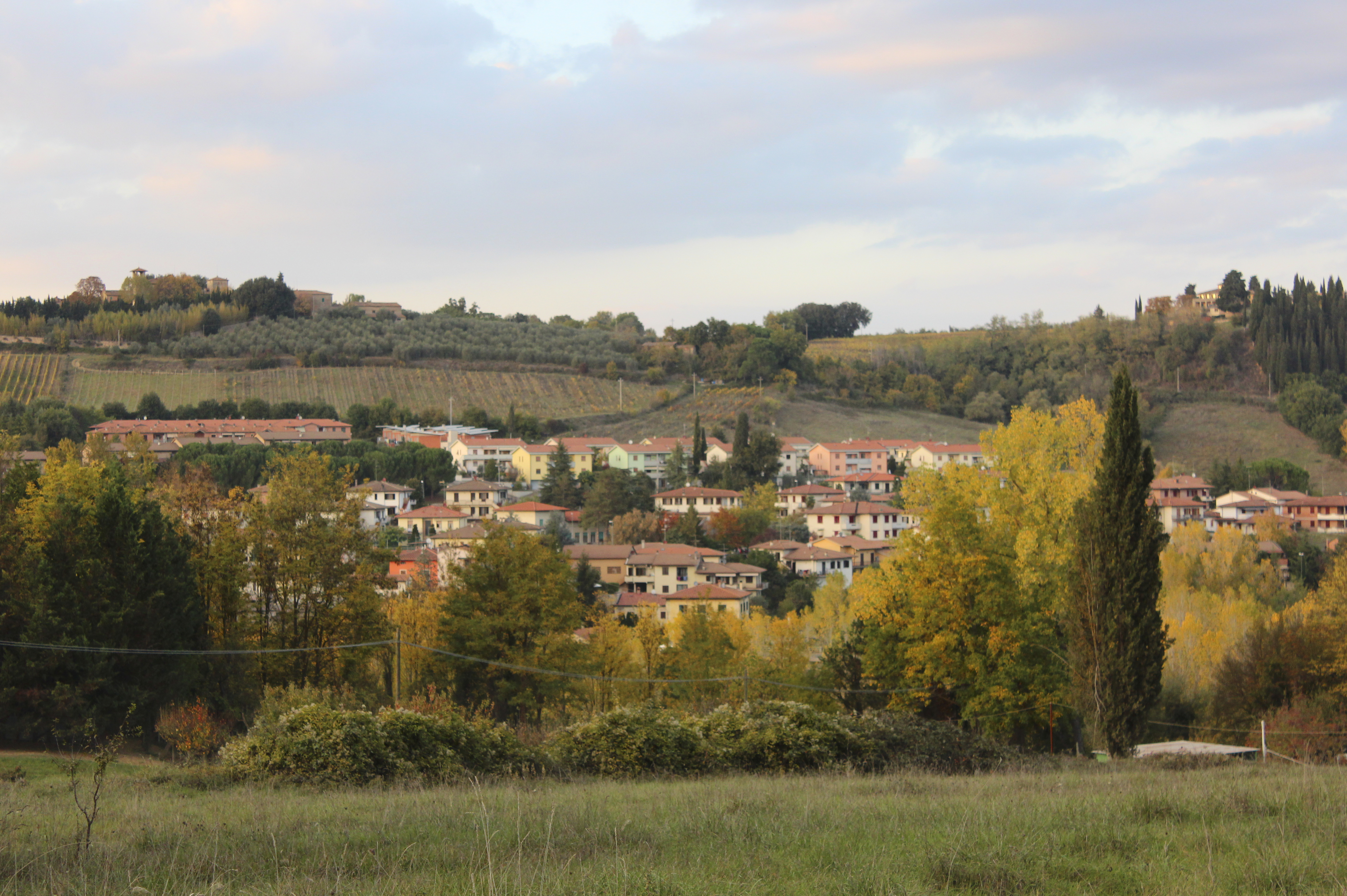
- View of Bellavista

- Location of Bellavista in Italy
- Coordinates: 43°26′26″N 11°10′00″E
- Country: Italy
- Region: Tuscany
- Province: Siena (SI)
- Comune: Poggibonsi
- Elevation: 140 m (460 ft)

Population (2011)
  - Total: 1,540
- Time zone: UTC+1 (CET)
  - Summer (DST): UTC+2 (CEST)

Bellavista is a village in Tuscany, central Italy, administratively a frazione of the comune of Poggibonsi, province of Siena. At the time of the 2001 census its population was 1,327.

Bellavista is about 28 km from Siena and 5 km from Poggibonsi.
