= Castello della Magione =

Medieval castle in Poggibonsi, central Italy

Coordinates: 43°27′25.02″N 11°09′30.73″E

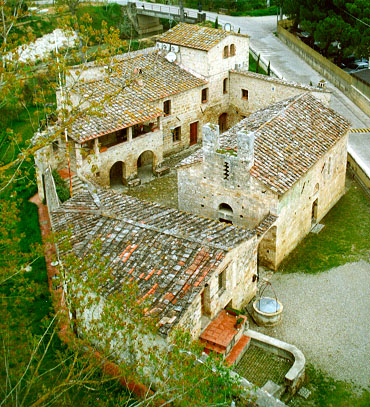
The Castello della Magione consists of a church, the residence of the Grand Master, offices and guest rooms.

The Castello della Magione (also Magione di San Giovanni al Ponte or Spedale di San Giovanni in Gerusalemme alla Magione) is a medieval castle in Poggibonsi (province of Siena, central Italy) that serves as the headquarters of the Militia Templi, an association of the Christian faithful belonging to the Roman Catholic Church. It is an example of a medieval "Mansio" (residence) that belonged to the Knights Templar. The castle includes the ancient church and the “spedale” (hotel) for the pilgrims in transit to Rome on the Via Francigena. The complex is near the ancient crossing of the Via Francigena over the Staggia River, near the Bonizio bridge, now destroyed.

== History ==
The castle dates from the 11th century. On 5 September 1140, it was donated by Gottifredo di Arnolfo and Arnolfino di Cristofano, heirs of the founders, to the Monks of the Saint Michael Abbey in Poggio Marturi. The monks entrusted it to the Knights of the Temple, becoming one of the numerous "Mansiones" or "Domus Templi" on the Via Francigena.

In 1312, as the Order of the Templars was suppressed by Pope Clement V, the Magione was given to the Knights Hospitaller.

The castle, downgraded to a farm, was bought by several people, among whom were the Princes Corsini. In 1979 it was acquired by Count Marcello Alberto Cristofani della Magione, who donated it to the Militia Templi, which was just being founded, as the Magistral See. After the donation, restoration of the entire complex began.

The castle maintains signs of its Romanesque origins, in spite of some changes made during the ensuing centuries.

== Overview ==
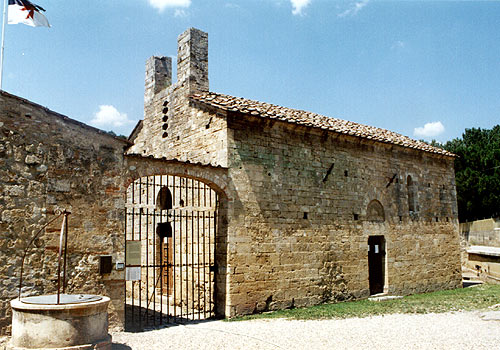
Church San Giovanni in Jerusalem

Seen from above, the complex assumes a nearly trapezoidal shape, in that it follows, on the west side, the course of the River Staggia. In the courtyard, visitors will see the premises of the convent for the Knights, the small guest-rooms and the flight of steps for access to the upper floor.

The Magistral Church of San Giovanni in Jerusalem is designed in a pure Romanesque style, as it can be seen from the altar. The restoration has shown the Burgundian-Cistercian influence of the vault construction.

== See also ==
- Militia Templi
- Tridentine Mass
- Traditionalist Catholic
