= Battle of Gogetti =

Final battle in the Second Italo-Ethiopian War

- Part of the Second Italo-Ethiopian War
Date	19 February 1937
Location	Near Lake Shala, Ethiopia
Result	Italian victory: Beginning of Yekatit 12

Belligerents
Ethiopia	Italy

Commanders and leaders
(Ethiopian Empire) Beyene Merid † (Ethiopian Empire) Gebre Mariam † (Ethiopian Empire) Desta Damtew (executed)	(Kingdom of Italy) Rodolfo Graziani

Units involved
Remnants of the Ethiopian Sidamo and Bale armies	Italian colonial troops

Strength
>2,000 men	Unknown

The Battle of Gogetti was the final battle between Ethiopia and the Italy preluding the Second World War. This battle was fought against the surviving troops of the armies of Sidamo and Bale. The Ethiopian armies were encircled and destroyed by the Italian forces near Lake Shala. Ethiopian leaders Beiene Merid and Dejazmach Gabre Mariam were killed in battle. Ras Desta Damtew, although wounded, escaped the brutal fight, only to be hunted down and killed five days later.

As retaliation for the attempted assassination of Rodolfo Graziani, Italian soldiers killed thousands of Ethiopian civilians.
