= San Pietro a Cedda, Poggibonsi =

Former Roman Catholic church in Tuscany, Italy

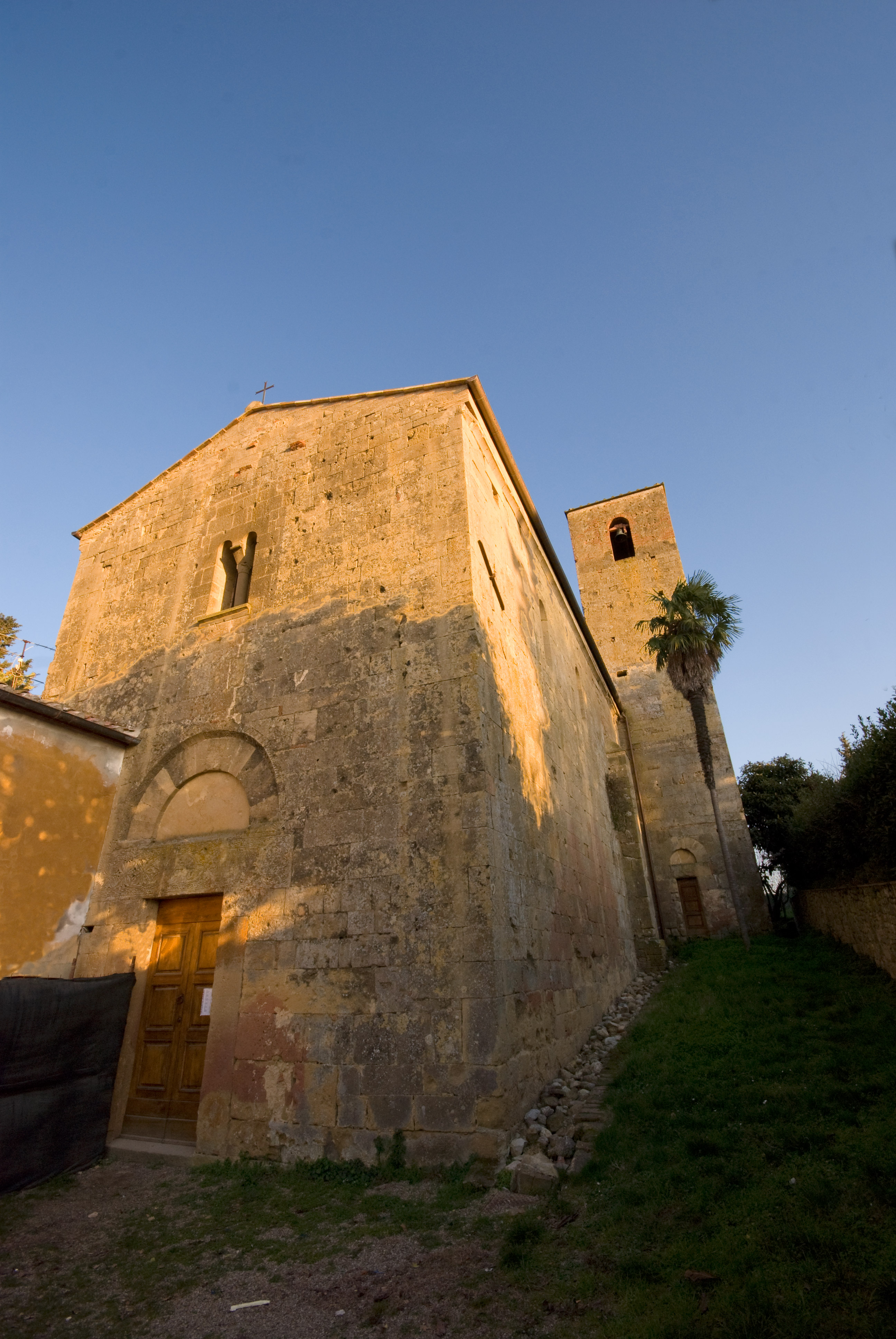
Facade and bell tower

San Pietro a Cedda is a Romanesque-style former Roman Catholic church located in the frazione of Cedda in the town of Poggibonsi, Province of Siena, region of Tuscany, Italy.

== History ==
This church is first documented in 998, when the Marquis of Tuscany, Ugo, donated this church to the Abbey of Marturi. In 1046, it is cited as being under the Pieve di Sant'Agnese a Castellina in Chianti.

The stone façade of the church is simple but decorated in foliated reliefs on the round portal. The mullioned window above the portal has a mysterious dedication to R, S, A, Ω. The apse has columns with decoration with human and animal forms. Traces of frescoes from the 13th century exist. The church also once had a triptych depicting the Madonna and Child with Saints Francis, Peter, Paul, Augustine, and donors painted by Ventura del Moro, also known as Pseudo Ambrogio di Valdese. Stolen in 1979, after recovery it has been housed in the Museo Civico e Diocesano di Colle.
