= Yekatit 12 monument =

Memorial in Addis Ababa, Ethiopia

Coordinates: 9°2′37.6″N 38°45′40.5″E

- የካቲት ፲፪
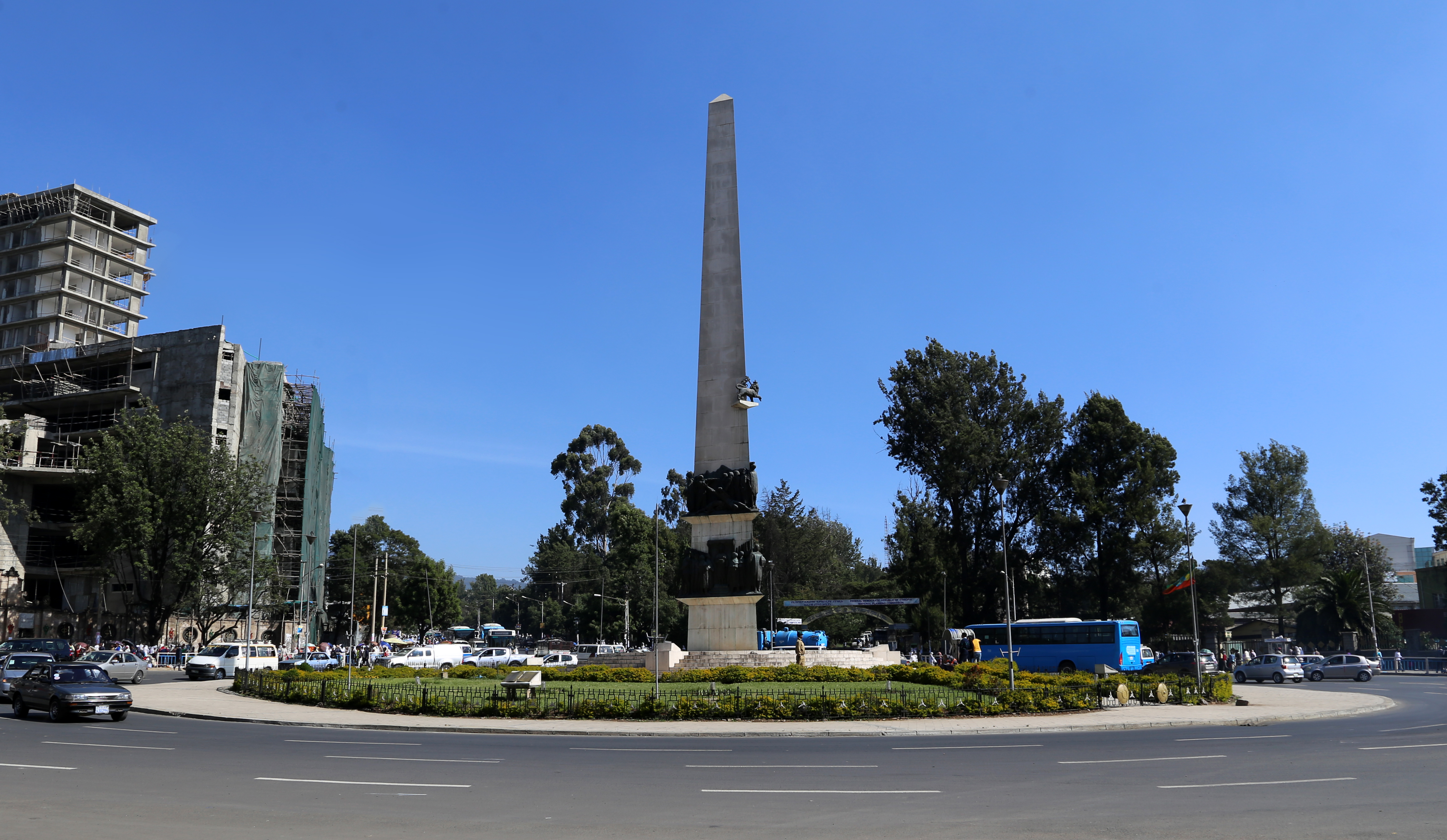
- Yekatit 12 monument
- Interactive map of Yekatit 12 monument
- Location: Addis Ababa, Ethiopia
- Designer: Antun Augustinčić and Frano Kršinić
- Type: Obelisk
- Material: bronze, Stone
- Height: 28 m (92 ft)
- Beginning date: 1944
- Completion date: 1944, 1955
- Opening date: 1944, 1955
- Dedicated to: victims of fascism

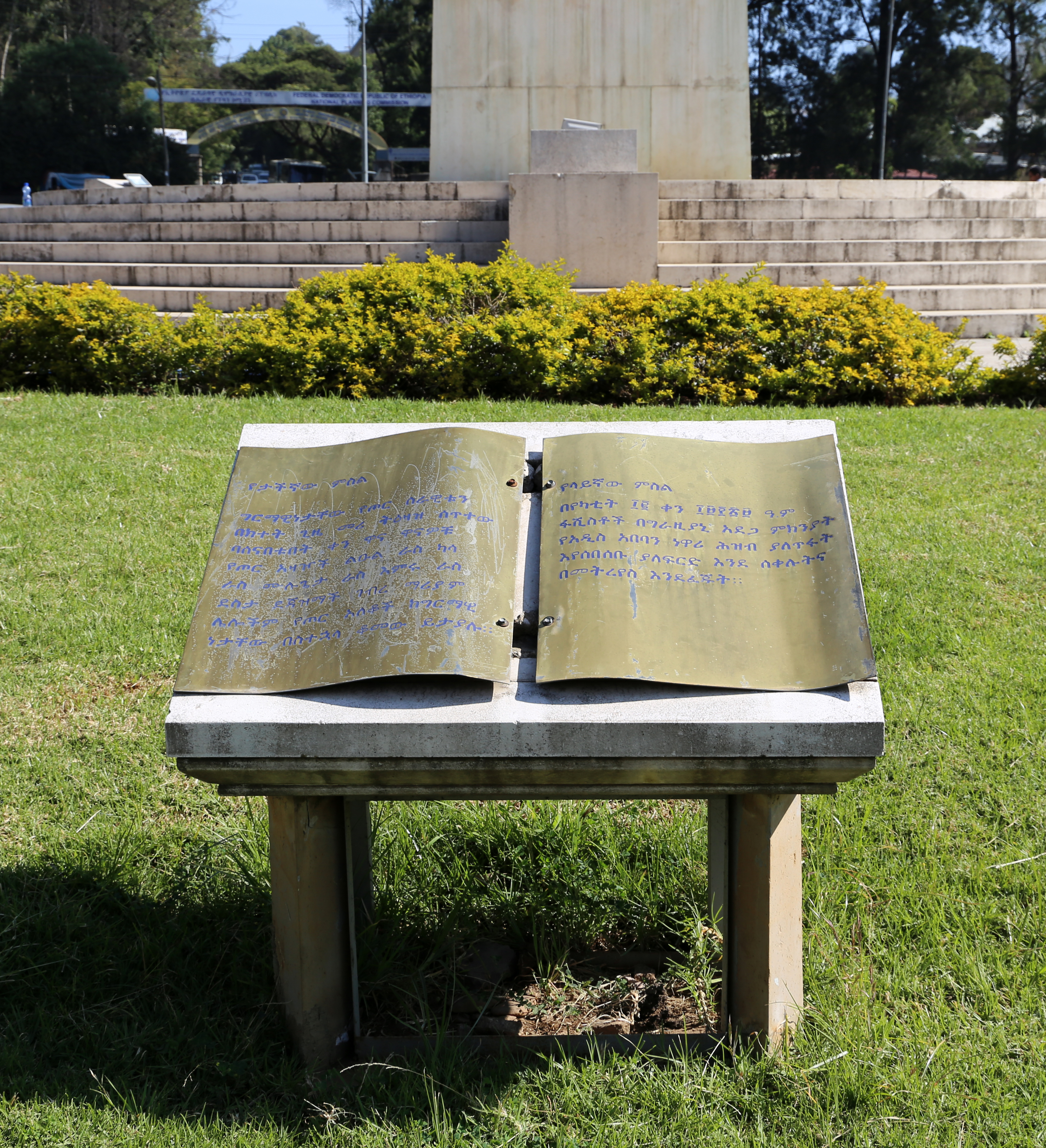
On stone tablets in the form of open booksthe history of the pogrom is explained in Amharic language

The Yekatit 12 monument is a memorial in Addis Ababa commemorating the Yekatit 12 pogrom, an Italian war crime in Ethiopia. The pogrom took place from 19 to 21 February 1937 and is known as Yekatit 12 (Amharic: የካቲት ፲፪) after the start date in the Ethiopian calendar. The memorial is an obelisk in the centre of the roundabout of Sidist Kilo Square (Amharic "Six Kilometers"), also called "Yekatit 12 Square".

== Description ==
The monument is a 28 m (92 ft) tall white stone obelisk. It was inaugurated on 2 November 1944 by the Ethiopian Emperor Haile Selassie. Since 1955, two reliefs, made of bronze, have been installed in the lower part, each running around the obelisk. The sculptural groups by the Yugoslav sculptors Antun Augustinčić and Frano Kršinić depict scenes of the pogrom and other war crimes such as the use of chemical weapons and the burial of victims after the liberation of the country. Above this, on one side, is a frieze of the Lion of Judah, the symbol of Emperor Haile Selassie and of Ethiopia until 1991. When the Ethiopian military junta came to power in 1974, it removed all lion symbols of the emperor in the country, except on this monument. The obelisk stands on a raised base, to which six steps lead from three directions.

== Commemoration ==
The inauguration of the sculptures at the monument took place on 14 December 1955, on the occasion of the official visit of Yugoslav President Josip Broz Tito to Ethiopia, who on that occasion also received honorary citizenship and the keys of the city of Addis Ababa. Since then, Haile Selassie laid a wreath at the foot of the obelisk every 19 February. The commemoration practice continued even during the Derg regime of Mengistu Haile Mariam. Subsequently, the wreath was laid by the Mayor of Addis Ababa and, more recently, by the President of Ethiopia.

== Name ==
The Yekatit-12 monument is also known as the "Monument to the Victims of Fascism", "Monument to the Martyrs" or, after the name of the square, "Sidistkilo".

== History of Bronze Sculptures ==
During his visit to President of Yugoslavia Josip Broz Tito the Emperor of Ethiopia Haile Selassie met Croatian sculptor Antun Augustinčić on the Brijuni islands. The Emperor invited Augustinčić to design a monument which will commemorate victims of Italian reprisals in Addis Ababa and stated "Who better than you will be able to portray the suffering of victims of fascism?". Augustinčić accepted the invitation and called his colleague Frano Kršinić with whom he designed the idea for the Monument to the Victims of Fascism. After he completed Yekatit 12 monument, Augustinčić constructed the Monument to the Ethiopian Partisan in Holeta and the Monument to Makonnen Wolde Mikael in Harar. To provide feedback and instruction for the Harar monument Afewerk Tekle went to Zagreb where he exchanged ideas with Augustinčić.

== See also ==
- Ethiopia–Yugoslavia relations
