= Arturo Mezzedimi =

Italian architect (1922–2010)

- Born: 19 June 1922; Poggibonsi, Siena, Italy
- Died: 30 May 2010 (aged 87); Siena, Italy
- Education: Istituto Tecnico per Geometri Vittorio Bottego, Asmara
- Occupation: Architect
- Buildings: Addis Ababa City Hall; Africa Hall
- Website: arturomezzedimi.it

Arturo Mezzedimi (19 June 1922 – 30 May 2010) was an Italian architect who worked principally in East Africa and the Middle East. He designed more than a hundred buildings in the Horn of Africa, among them Addis Ababa City Hall and Africa Hall, and planned more than twenty urban centres in Ethiopia. In 1965 he received the Mangia d'Oro prize of the city of Siena, and in 1972 was made a Grande Ufficiale of the Ordine al Merito della Repubblica Italiana.
