= Ethiopia–Serbia relations =

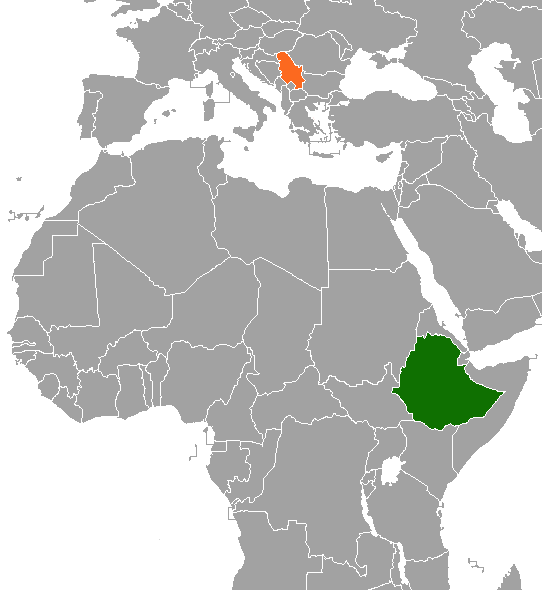

- Ethiopia: Serbia

Ethiopia and Serbia maintain diplomatic relations established between Ethiopia and SFR Yugoslavia in 1962. From 1962 to 2006, Ethiopia maintained relations with the Socialist Federal Republic of Yugoslavia (SFRY) and the Federal Republic of Yugoslavia (FRY) (later Serbia and Montenegro), of which Serbia is considered shared (SFRY) or sole (FRY) legal successor.

== History ==
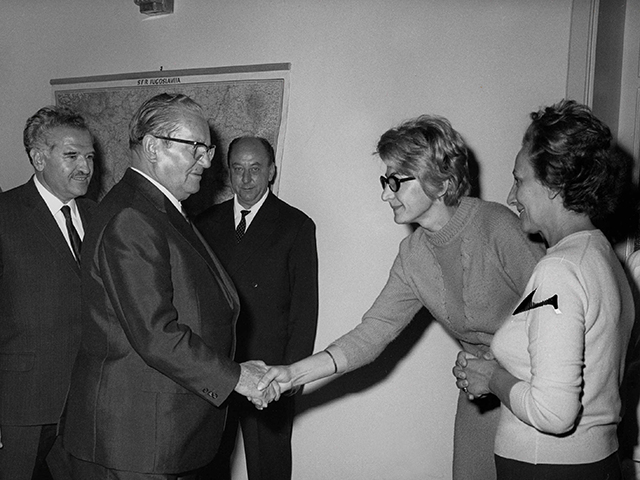
President Josip Broz Tito visiting Yugoslavian embassy in Addis Ababa, 1970

The former state of Yugoslavia maintained diplomatic ties with Ethiopia and shared membership of the NAM bloc. Josip Broz Tito granted Haile Selassie I the title of honorary citizen of the city of Belgrade. The first vessel of the Ethiopian Navy was a gift from Yugoslavia, and as a sign of thanks Marshal Tito was given a villa in Addis Ababa which is now the Serbian Embassy.

In 2012, after travelling to Addis Ababa in order to reaffirm Ethiopia's stance on Kosovo regarding Serbia, Vuk Jeremić and Haile Mariam signed a memorandum of understanding between the two nations' ministries of foreign affairs.

== Ethiopia's stance on Kosovo ==
Ethiopia is one of Serbia's strongest advocates in Africa when it comes to their position on the non-recognition of Kosovo.

== Economic relations ==
In 2011, as a result of a meeting between Serbian tractor manufacturer Industrija Motora Rakovica announced it would begin exporting tractor frames and motors to Ethiopia for assembly. The first of the partially assembled tractors from Rakovica arrived in Ethiopia later that year.

== Resident diplomatic missions ==
- Ethiopia is accredited to Serbia from its embassy in Rome, Italy.
- Serbia has an embassy in Addis Ababa.

== See also ==
- Foreign relations of Serbia
- Ethiopia–Yugoslavia relations
- Yugoslavia and the Non-Aligned Movement
- Yugoslavia and the Organisation of African Unity
