= Lecchi di Staggia =

- Frazione
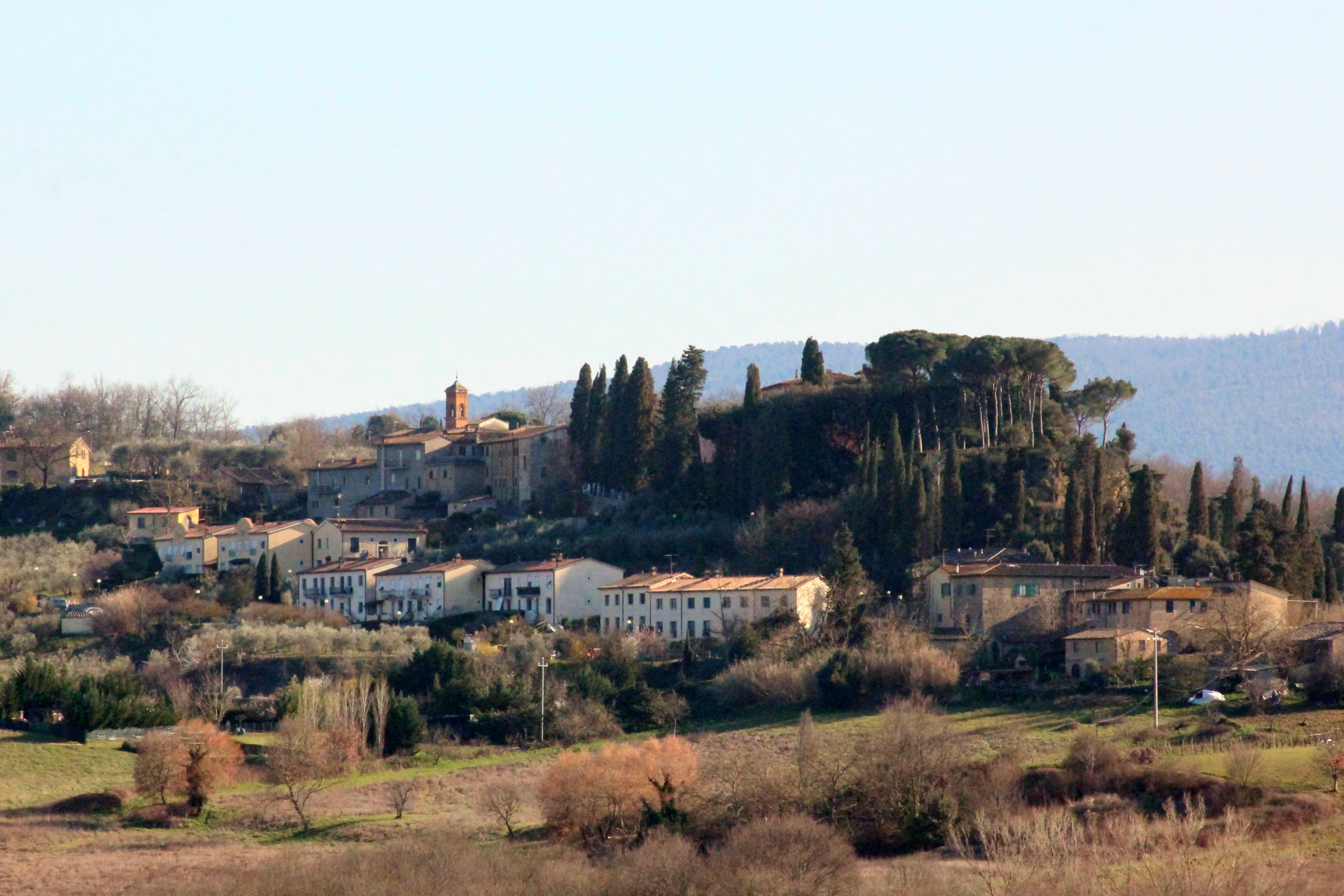
- View of Lecchi di Staggia

- Location of Lecchi di Staggia in Italy
- Coordinates: 43°26′14″N 11°11′13″E
- Country: Italy
- Region: Tuscany
- Province: Siena (SI)
- Comune: Poggibonsi
- Elevation: 233 m (764 ft)

Population (2011)
  - Total: 197
- Time zone: UTC+1 (CET)
  - Summer (DST): UTC+2 (CEST)

Lecchi di Staggia is a village in Tuscany, central Italy, in the comune of Poggibonsi, province of Siena. At the time of the 2001 census its population was 159.

Lecchi is about 27 km from Siena and 6 km from Poggibonsi.
