= Addis Ababa City Hall =

Governmental department in Addis Ababa, Ethiopia

- አዲስ አበባ ማዘጋጃ ቤት
- Location within Ethiopia

General information
- Type: Municipal building
- Architectural style: Modernism
- Location: Addis Ababa, Ethiopia
- Coordinates: 9°02′05″N 38°45′03″E
- Elevation: 7,726 feet (2,355 m)
- Current tenants: Government of Addis Ababa
- Construction started: 1961
- Completed: 1964

Height
- Height: 42 m

Technical details
- Floor area: 140,000 m^{2}

Design and construction
- Architect: Arturo Mezzedimi
- Main contractor: ETBURG - Salvatore Rizza & Cesare Battisti

The Addis Ababa City Hall (Amharic: አዲስ አበባ ማዘጋጃ ቤት) is a governmental department that houses the offices of the Municipality of Addis Ababa, Ethiopia.

== History ==
Along with Africa Hall, the UNECA headquarters, Addis Ababa City Hall was one of the two projects designed to demonstrate, in the words of Emperor Haile Selassie, “that it is possible to construct grand buildings here too [in Ethiopia], by erecting a couple of high-profile structures. It is not their complexity or size that matter, but the maximum possible use of home-produced materials, in order to shake our wealthy middle class (which keeps its money under the mattress) from the inactivity that also binds it in the field of construction, and stimulate it to invest its assets also in building to make this ‘great village’ a city and a true great capital”. Construction commenced in 1961 and was completed in 1964. Queen Elizabeth II received the freedom of the city on 4 February 1965 in a ceremony here, and attended a banquet in her honour that day.

== Features ==
The structure is situated at the northern end of Churchill Avenue, and is a direct consequence of the avenue's re-routing, sitting on top of a hill overlooking the thoroughfare. The structure features various spaces – the hall, boardroom, reception room, cinema-theatre, restaurant, four bars, library, and panoramic terrace – making it a social as well as an administrative centre.
