= Poggibonsi =

- Comune
- Comune di Poggibonsi
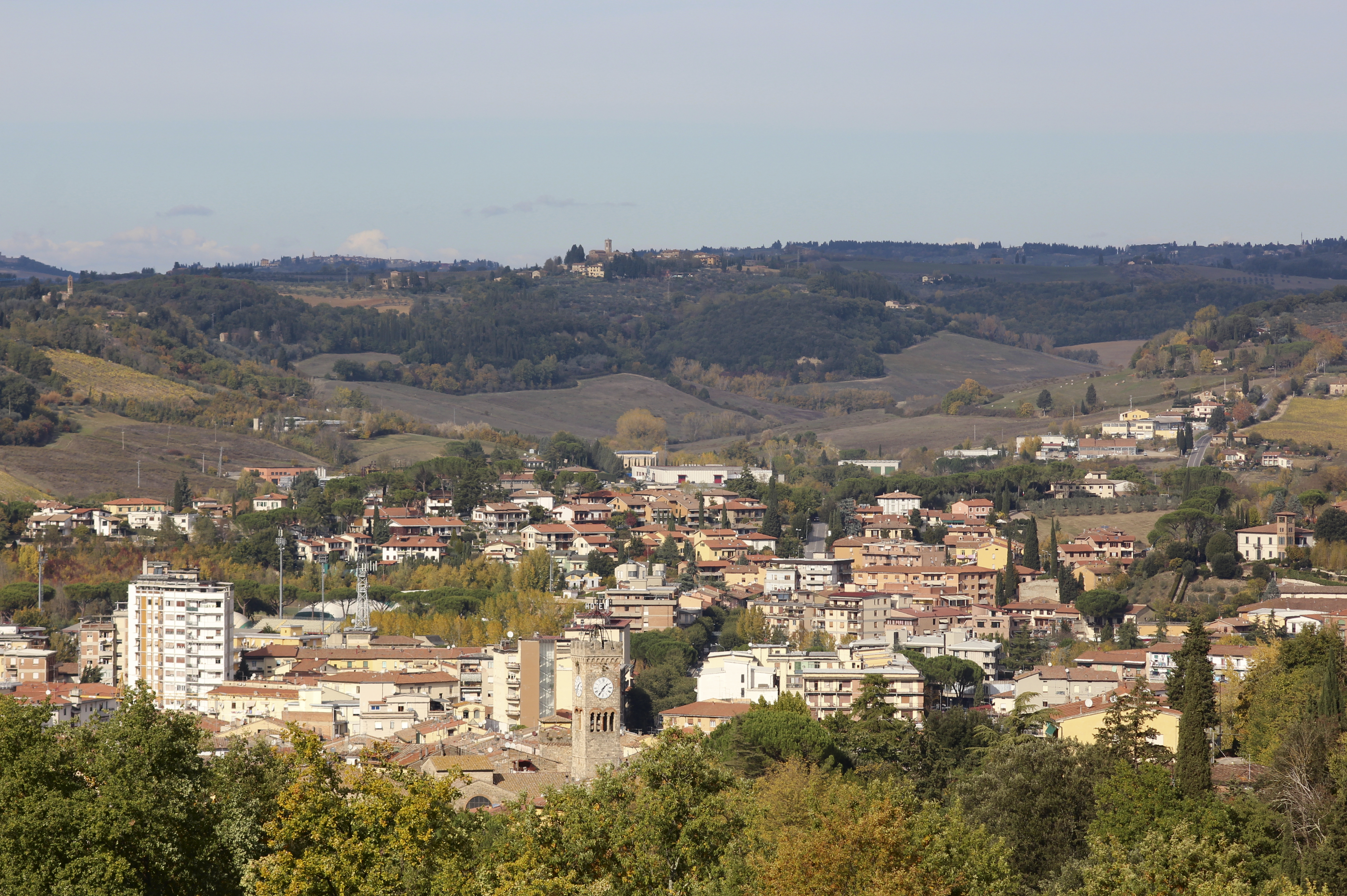

- Coat of arms

- Location within Italy Location within Tuscany
- Coordinates: 43°28′N 11°09′E
- Country: Italy
- Region: Tuscany
- Province: Siena (SI)
- Frazioni: Bellavista, Staggia Senese

Government
  - Mayor: Susanna Cenni

Area
  - Total: 70.59 km^{2} (27.25 sq mi)
- Elevation: 116 m (381 ft)

Population (31 October 2021)
  - Total: 28,672
  - Density: 406.2/km^{2} (1,052/sq mi)
- Demonym: Poggibonsesi
- Time zone: UTC+1 (CET)
  - Summer (DST): UTC+2 (CEST)
- Postal code: 53036
- Dialing code: 0577
- Patron saint: St. Luchesius
- Saint day: April 28
- Website: www.comune.poggibonsi.si.it

Poggibonsi is a town in the province of Siena, Tuscany, Central Italy. It is located on the Elsa River and is the main town of the Valdelsa Valley.

== History ==
The area around Poggibonsi was already settled in the Neolithic age, although the earliest evidence of civilisation dates from Etruscan-Roman age, as shown by several necropolises and by placenames such as "Talciona" or "Marturi" (from the Etruscan name of Mars).

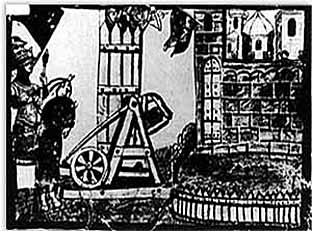
Siege of Poggiobonizio by Charles I of Anjou

The importance of the area dates back to the 10th century, thanks to its position across the Via Francigena, an ancient itinerary and pilgrimage route. At that time, the settlement of Borgo di Marte (later Marturi, Borgo Vecchio and then Poggibonsi), began to develop, although its origins are still debated by historians. Around 1010, the settlement of Borgo di Camaldo was established. In 1155 or 1156, the inhabitants of these and other nearby towns were relocated by Guido Guerra, of the Guidi Counts, to a hill where a new settlement, Poggiobonizio, was established. In the 12th century, the Cathars had a major theological school in Poggibonsi. After being declared an Imperial City by Emperor Frederick II, according to Giovanni Villani it was one of the most beautiful cities in Italy. Poggiobonizio, which adhered to the Ghibellines, was destroyed by the Florentine Guelphs in 1270. After 1293, Poggibonsi remained under Florentine rule. Emperor Henry VII ordered the town to be rebuilt in 1313 as Monte Imperiale, but construction came to an end after his death. In 1484, Lorenzo de' Medici had a new settlement built in Poggiobonizio according to the Renaissance idea of the "Ideal City", protected by a fortress designed by Antonio and Giuliano da Sangallo. Work, however, was halted in 1510.

After a brief period of French rule in the early 19th century, it became part of a united Italy in 1861. From the 20th century onwards, Poggibonsi's economy has been characterised by the production and trade of Chianti wine and by industrial development. Poggibonsi is the smallest of the Chianti Classico sub-regions.

== Main sights ==
- The Palazzo Pretorio (late 13th century): with its adjoining Torre del Podestà was the seat of the local government until the construction of the Palazzo Comunale in the 19th century. The lower floor, with the loggia, is built of travertine, while the upper storey combines brick and travertine. Since 1997, it has housed a palaeontological museum.
- The Church of San Lorenzo: built by the Augustinian order in Gothic-Romanesque style. In 1495, it was the seat of the meeting between Charles VIII of France and Girolamo Savonarola. The interior houses a painting by Neri di Bicci of St. Nicholas, a 14th-century wooden crucifix by Giovanni d'Agostino and a painting of the Madonna delle Grazie.
- Santuario del Romituzzo: 15th-century oratory-sanctuary with campanile and portico housing a venerated image of the Madonna della Neve (Madonna of the Snows). The upper floor houses numerous ex-voto offerings.

Nearby are:

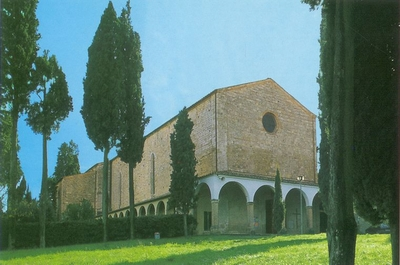
The Basilica of San Lucchese

- Basilica of San Lucchese: large Gothic church, built around 1252 on the site of an earlier church of San Camaldo, traces of which can be seen in the façade and left wall. It is located on a hill near the city. The chapel apse was built in the 14th century, while the portico dates from the 17th century. The interior houses a terracotta statue of the Immaculate Conception by Giovanni della Robbia, frescoes by Bartolo di Fredi, Taddeo Gaddi, Cennino Cennini and Arturo Agliardi. The relics of San Lucchese, patron saint of Poggibonsi, are in the eponymous chapel. The adjoining convent's refectory has a fresco by Gerino da Pistoia.
- The Fonte delle Fate ("Fairies' Spring"): one of the few remains of the destroyed Poggiobonizio, from the early 13th century. It was discovered in 1803.
- Castello della Magione: located on the Via Francigena, it was once the headquarters of the Knights Templars, before passing to the Knights Hospitallers after the Templars were abolished in 1312. The small church has a single nave ending with a noteworthy apse. The complex is currently the headquarters of the Militia Templi.
- In the frazione of Staggia Senese: castle (Rocca), probably dating back to the Lombard period, which belonged to the Florentine family of the Franzesi from the 13th century. A museum (known as the smallest museum in the world) in the village houses an important work by Antonio del Pollaiuolo, the Santa Maria Egiziaca, as well as other panels from the 14th and 15th centuries.
- Castello di Strozzavolpe ("Castle of the Fox-Strangler"): ancient fortress of the Guidi family. According to legend, it was connected to Poggiobonizio by a tunnel.
- San Martino a Luco: Romanesque Pieve church.
- The Church of Sant'Andrea a Palapiano: one of the finest examples of Romanesque architecture in the area. Although known from before the 11th century, the current building dates from the 13th century.
- Santa Maria a Talciona: 12th-13th century church with a bas-relief from 1234 on the portal depicting the Adoration of the Magi.
- San Lorenzo in Piandecampi: the small Romanesque church houses a 15th-century fresco by Pier Francesco Fiorentino.
- The Magione di Torri: castle of the Hospitallers built in the early 11th century.
- Pieve of San Pietro a Cedda: Romanesque Pieve church located a few kilometres from the centre of Poggibonsi. It is an abbey-like building with a noteworthy apse and a large bell tower. The complex decoration of the portals and windows is also significant. The interior has a tabernacle attributed to Mino da Fiesole. It also once housed a 14th-century triptych of the Florentine School, now in the town museum of Colle di Val d'Elsa.

== Frazioni ==
The municipality consists of the city of Poggibonsi and the towns and villages (frazioni) of Bellavista and Staggia Senese. Other notable villages include Case Bolzano, Castiglioni, Cedda, Cinciano, Gavignano, Lecchi di Staggia, Luco, Montemorli, Papaiano, Piandicampi, Sant'Antonio del Bosco and Talciona.

== International relations ==
Poggibonsi is twinned with:

- Corleto Perticara, Italy
- Werne, Germany
- Marcq-en-Barœul, France
- Braga, Portugal

== Popular culture ==
"Poggibonsi" is a song written by Franco Battiato and performed by Milva on her 1982 album Milva e dintorni.

"Bonipoggio", a take-off of Poggibonsi, is the title of a cardinal played by Roger Ashton-Griffiths, in the BBC TV series Father Brown (S4E5, "The Daughter of Autolychus").

== Sports ==
The local football team is US Poggibonsi.

== People ==
- Luchesius Modestini, lay Franciscan
- Niccolò da Poggibonsi, monk
- Gaetano Pieraccini, physician and politician
- Leonetta Cecchi Pieraccini, painter
- Arturo Mezzedimi, archictect
- Novello Novelli, character actor
- Loretta Montemaggi, politician
- Tobia Masini, racing driver
- Alberto Bettiol, professional cyclist

== Sources ==
- Heer, Friedrich. The Mediaeval World Europe 1100-1350.
