= US Poggibonsi =

Italian football club

Poggibonsi
- Full name: Unione Sportiva Poggibonsi s.r.l.
- Nickname(s): Leoni (Lions); Giallorossi (Yellow-Reds)
- Founded: 1925
- Ground: Stadio Stefano Lotti, Poggibonsi, Italy
- Capacity: 2,513
- Chairman: Giuseppe Vellini
- Manager: Stefano Calderini
- League: Serie D Group E
- 2023–24: Serie D Group E, 7th of 18
Home colours	Away colours

Unione Sportiva Poggibonsi is an Italian association football club located in Poggibonsi, Tuscany. It currently plays in Serie D Group E.

== History ==
The club was founded in 1925 as Unione Sportiva Poggibonsi. It was renamed Poggibonsi Valdelsa in 2002 and played under this name at the professional level in the 2002–03 Serie C2.

After that season, the team was excluded from playing Serie C2 by the federation because of financial problems and admitted to Eccellenza instead. At the beginning of the 2004–05 season, the club was refounded under his original name US Poggibonsi and promptly won the league in its first attempt. Poggibonsi played in the Serie D from 2004 to 2006, when the club, which ended the 2005–06 Serie D season in third place, was promoted because league winners Fortis Spoleto and second-placed Fortis Juventus were unable to play in the Serie C2 league. The club ended its 2006–07 Serie C2 campaign in thirteenth place, one point above the relegation playoff spots, and therefore remained in the Lega Pro Seconda Divisione (the rebranded Serie C2) in the 2007–08 season.

Poggibonsi were relegated back to Serie D on 2013–14, after completing their season in 16th place.

== Colors and badge ==
The team colors are red and yellow.
