= Desta =

Desta may refer to:

== Surname ==
- Aida Desta (1927–2013), Ethiopian princess
- Araya Desta (born 1945), Eritrean diplomat
- Asrat Desta (?–1977), Ethiopian politician
- Bereket Desta (born 1990), Ethiopian sprinter
- Hirut Desta (1930–2014), Ethiopian princess
- Gebre Kristos Desta (1932–1981), Ethiopian modern artist
- Iskinder Desta (1934–1974), Ethiopian nobility and naval officer
- Tamrat Desta (1978–2018), Ethiopian singer
- Seble Desta (1931–2023), Ethiopian princess
- Sophia Desta (1934–2021), Ethiopian princess

== Given name ==
- Desta Asgedom (1972–1992), Ethiopian athlete
- Desta Damtew (ca. 1892– 1937), Ethiopian nobility and military personnel
- Desta Girma Tadesse (born 1987), Ethiopian female long-distance runner
- Desta Hagos (born 1952), Ethiopian painter

== See also ==
- Desta: The Memories Between, 2022 action video game by Ustwo
- Desta, PLC is one of the largest privately owned apparel manufacturers and exporters in Ethiopia.
- Desta is a defunct watch manufacturer
