= Aida Desta =

Ethiopian prince; eldest granddaughter of Emperor Haile Selassie

Princess Aida Desta Helassie
- Princess of Ethiopia
- Born: 8 April 1927; Ethiopian Empire
- Died: 15 January 2013 (aged 85); Alexandria, Virginia, U.S.
- Burial: Holy Trinity Cathedral, Addis Ababa
- Spouse: Leul Ras Mengesha Seyoum
- Issue: Woizero Ribka Mengesha; Lij Mikael Sehul Mengesha; Lij Yohannes Mengesha; Lij Estifanos Mengesha; Lij Jalyee Mengesha; Lij Seyoum Mengesha; Woizero Menen Mengesha
- Bisrate Gabriel
- Dynasty: House of Solomon (Sahle Selassie branch)
- Father: Desta Damtew
- Mother: Princess Tenagnework
- Religion: Ethiopian Orthodox Tewahedo

Princess Aida Desta of Ethiopia (8 April 1927 – 15 January 2013), baptismal name Bisrate Gabriel, was the eldest granddaughter of Emperor Haile Selassie, eldest child and daughter of Ras Desta Damtew and Princess Tenagnework. She was the wife of Leul Ras Mengesha Seyoum, Prince of Tigray, son of Seyoum Mengesha, and great-grandson of Emperor Yohannes IV. Her godmother was Empress Zewditu of Ethiopia.

== Biography ==
The young Princess accompanied her mother, siblings, and grandparents into exile in 1936 upon the occupation of Ethiopia by fascist Italy. Her father Ras Desta Damtew however led the resistance forces in southern Ethiopia for some months, until he was captured by the Italians and executed in 1937.

Princess Aida and her three sisters were educated at the School of St Clare, Polwithen House, Penzance, Cornwall and Clarendon School for Girls in north Wales. She continued her studies at Newnham College, University of Cambridge, where she studied history, matriculating in 1945.

Princess Aida later returned to Ethiopia and married Leul Ras Mengesha Seyoum (Prince of Tigray) in Addis Ababa, in January 1949. They would go on to have five sons and a daughter.

- Woizero Ribka Mengesha
- Lij Mikael Sehul Mengesha (born 1949)
- Lij Yohannes Mengesha (born 27 July 1951)
- Lij Estifanos Mengesha (born 24 October 1953)
- Lij Jalyee Mengesha (born 1955)
- Lij Seyoum Mengesha (born 1957)
- Woizero Menen Mengesha (born 1963)

Princess Aida was active in charitable and cultural pursuits in Ethiopia during the reign of her grandfather Emperor Haile Selassie.

In 1974, Princess Aida was seized at the palace at Mekele by revolutionary soldiers sent to arrest her husband. Ras Mangasha had escaped days earlier and would establish the Ethiopian Democratic Union (EDU) which would fight the Derg regime until the EDU fractured in 1977 between rival factions. Princess Aida however had decided to remain behind and share the fate of her grandfather, her mother, and her family.

Princess Aida was among the women of the Imperial family who were incarcerated under the Derg for 14 years. Her brother Prince Rear Admiral Iskinder Desta was executed along with 62 other former officials on Friday November 23, 1974. Together with her mother Princess Tenagnework Haile Selassie, and her sisters Princesses Seble, Sophia and Hirut, were Princess Sara Gizaw, Duchess of Harar (Widow of Prince Makonnen Haile Selasssie), Princess Yeshashework Yilma (the Emperor's niece by his elder brother), Princess Ijigayehu Asfaw Wossen (daughter of the Crown Prince) and Princess Zuriashwork Gebre-Igziabiher (widow of Prince Asrate Kassa).

These women were made to share a former storage room in the precincts of the notorious Akaki Prison known as "Alem Bekagn" which translates to "I am done with the world". They shared mattresses on the floor and were forced to endure the light of a single light bulb that was never turned off during their entire imprisonment. Years of campaigning by their friends and relatives as well as human rights and humanitarian organizations around the world had little effect in convincing the Derg regime to release the women of the Imperial family. The Princesses were suddenly and unexpectedly released from prison in September 1988, followed a year later by the men of the family.

After their release, Princess Aida resumed her interrupted family life with her husband and children in exile. She returned to Ethiopia after the fall of the Derg and split her time between the suburbs of Washington, D.C. and Addis Ababa.

She died on January 15, 2013, in Alexandria, Virginia.

== Patronages ==
- President of the Ethiopian Women's Welfare Association
- Honorary President of the African Services Committee (New York)

== Honours ==
=== National dynastic honours ===
- (Ethiopia) House of Solomon: Knight Grand Cordon with Collar of the Order of the Queen of Sheba"Ethiopian Unity Diaspora Forum". Archived from the original on 2016-04-07.
- (Ethiopia) House of Solomon: Recipient of the Refugee Medal
- (Ethiopia) House of Solomon: Recipient of the Emperor Haile Selassie I Coronation Medal
- (Ethiopia) House of Solomon: Recipient of the Silver Anniversary Medal of Emperor Haile Selassie I and Empress Menen
- (Ethiopia) House of Solomon: Recipient of the Emperor Haile Selassie I Ruby Jubilee and 75th Birthday Medal

=== Foreign honours ===
- Belgium: Knight Grand Cross of the Order of Leopold II
- Brazil: Grand Cross of the Order of the Southern Cross
- Czechoslovakia: Grand Cross of the Order of the White Lion
- Ghana: Grand Cross of the Order of the Volta
- (Kingdom of Greece) Greek Royal Family: Dame Grand Cross of the Order of Beneficence

== Ancestry ==
Ancestors of Aida Desta

8. Balambaras Ketena Abebe
4. Fitawrari Damtew Ketena
9. Woizero - -
2. Ras Desta Damtew
10. - -
5. -
11. Woizero - -
1. Princess Aida Desta
12. Ras Makonnen Woldemikael
6. Haile Selassie I
13. Woizero Yeshimebet Ali
3. Princess Tenagnework of Ethiopia
14. Dejazmach Asfaw Mikael
7. Itege Menen Asfaw
15. Woizero Sehin Mikael

== Sources ==
- Mockler, Anthony (2002). Haile Sellassie's War. New York: Olive Branch Press. ISBN 978-1-56656-473-1.
