= Princess Tenagnework =

Eldest child of Emperor Haile Selassie (1912–2003)

Tenagnework Selassie
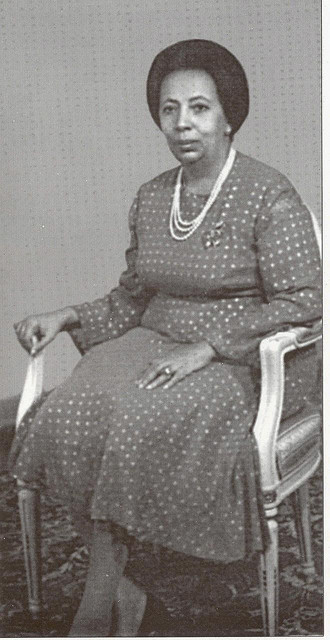
- Born: 12 January 1912; Harar, Ethiopian Empire
- Died: 6 April 2003 (aged 91); Addis Ababa, Ethiopia
- Burial: Holy Trinity Cathedral
- Spouse: Ras Desta Damtew; Ras Andargachew Messai
- Issue: Lij Amha Desta; Rear Admiral Iskinder Desta; Princess Aida Desta; Princess Seble Desta; Princess Sophia Desta; Princess Hirut Desta; Emebet Tsige Mariam Abebe; Emebet Mentewab Andargatchew
Names
- Fikirte Mariam
- Dynasty: House of Solomon (Shewan Branch)
- Father: Haile Selassie
- Mother: Menen Asfaw
- Religion: Ethiopian Orthodox Tewahedo

Princess Tenagnework Haile Selassie (baptismal name: Fikirte Mariam; 12 January 1912 – 6 April 2003) was the eldest child of Emperor Haile Selassie and Empress Menen Asfaw.

== Early life ==
Born in the city of Harar, Princess Tenagnework received her title upon her father's succession to the imperial throne in November 1930. Princess Tenagnework was first married to Ras Desta Damtew, a member of the prominent aristocratic Addisge clan. Ras Desta and Princess Tenagnework were the parents of two sons, Amha and Iskinder Desta (later Rear Admiral), and four daughters, Princesses Aida Desta, Seble Desta, Sophia Desta and Hirut Desta. Ras Desta Damtew was appointed Governor-General, first of Kaffa and Limu, and then of Sidamo.

In 1935, following the invasion of Ethiopia by Italy, the imperial family was forced to flee into exile at Fairfield House, Bath in England. However, Ras Desta remained behind to command the imperial forces fighting in the south of the country. Ras Desta was captured and summarily executed by the fascist forces. While in exile, Princess Tenagnework gave birth to Emebet Tsige Mariam (Mary) during a brief union with Ato Abebe Retta, who later served in ambassadorial and other roles in the post-war imperial government, and would eventually become president of the Imperial Senate after their separation.

== Government career ==
In 1941, with British assistance, Emperor Haile Selassie was restored to his throne, and Princess Tenagnework and her children returned to Ethiopia. Unfortunately, her elder son, Amha Desta, died shortly before the return. Princess Tenagnework would eventually marry Betwoded (later Ras) Andargachew Messai, who had formerly served as "Afe-Mesfin" and representative for the underage Prince Makonnen in his Duchy of Harar. They were married at the Miskea Hazunan Medhane Alem Church ("Church of the Savior of the World, Consoler of the Bereaved") in September 1944. Bitwoded Andargachew was then appointed Governor-General of Begemder and Semien provinces, and the couple were based in Gondar.

The couple then served as the Vice-Roy and Vice-Rein of Eritrea, representing the Emperor there when the former Italian colony was federated to Ethiopia in 1951. Bitwoded Andargachew served in many other governmental posts. He was elevated to the title of Ras, served as Minister of the Interior, and was made an Imperial Senator and a Crown Councilor. Princess Tenagnework and Ras Andargatchew Messai were the parents of a daughter, Mentewab Andargachew, who died in childhood. After the death of her mother, Empress Menen Asfaw in 1961, Princess Tenagnework became the most visible and foremost woman at the imperial court and played an ever-increasing advisory role to the monarch.

The princess was often described as the child most like her father in temperament and character. A strong personality credited with mostly conservative views, she was widely regarded as a guardian of the institution of the monarchy. She was perceived as a leader of the traditionalist element within the nobility, which was seen as opposing constitutional and land tenure reform.

== Imprisonment ==
Princess Tenagnework and the rest of the imperial family were arrested on 11 September 1974, the day before Emperor Haile Selassie was formally deposed by the Derg. After a brief time when the family were kept under house arrest at the home of the late Duke of Harar, they were then moved to the Akaki Prison, also known as "Alem Bekagn" which translates to "I have had enough of this world". Princess Tenagnework and the other royal women were kept in the separate women's section of the prison, and Princess Tenagnework received the distinction of being listed as "Prisoner #1" in all Ethiopia. On 23 November 1974, the Derg executed sixty-one former officials of the imperial government without trial. Among the many relatives, friends and associates of the Princess to die at this time, was her remaining son, Rear Admiral Iskinder (Alexander) Desta.

The Princess was allowed a final visit with her father only a few days before his death in August 1975. That same year her daughter Tsige Mariam Abebe Retta had committed suicide by slitting her throat. Her niece Princess Ijigayehu Asfaw Wossen also died in that year under imprisonment due to untreated illness. Princess Tenagnework’s husband, Ras Andargachew Messai (1902-1981), who had been outside Ethiopia when the monarchy fell, died after a long illness in London a few years later (16 August 1981).

After an imprisonment of fifteen years, the women of the imperial family were freed in 1989. A year later, the imprisoned males of the family were also released. After living in Addis Ababa quietly for a little over a year, Princess Tenagnework and a few of the other members of the imperial family were allowed to depart into exile. Princess Tenagnework travelled to London and from there joined her only surviving brother, Crown Prince Asfaw Wossen in the Virginia suburbs of Washington DC.

== Later life ==
Princess Tenagnework settled in her second exile, in the Virginia suburbs of Washington D.C., to be near her only surviving sibling, Amha Selassie (Crown Prince Asfaw Wossen). The imperial family was living mostly in the Washington area and in London at the time. The death of her brother in 1997 deeply affected her, and her health began to decline. She returned permanently to Ethiopia in 1999. On 5 November 2000, Emperor Haile Selassie was reburied at Holy Trinity Cathedral with much pomp conducted by the Ethiopian Orthodox Tewahedo Church. The Princess attended the burial, which was refused state funeral status by the EPRDF government.

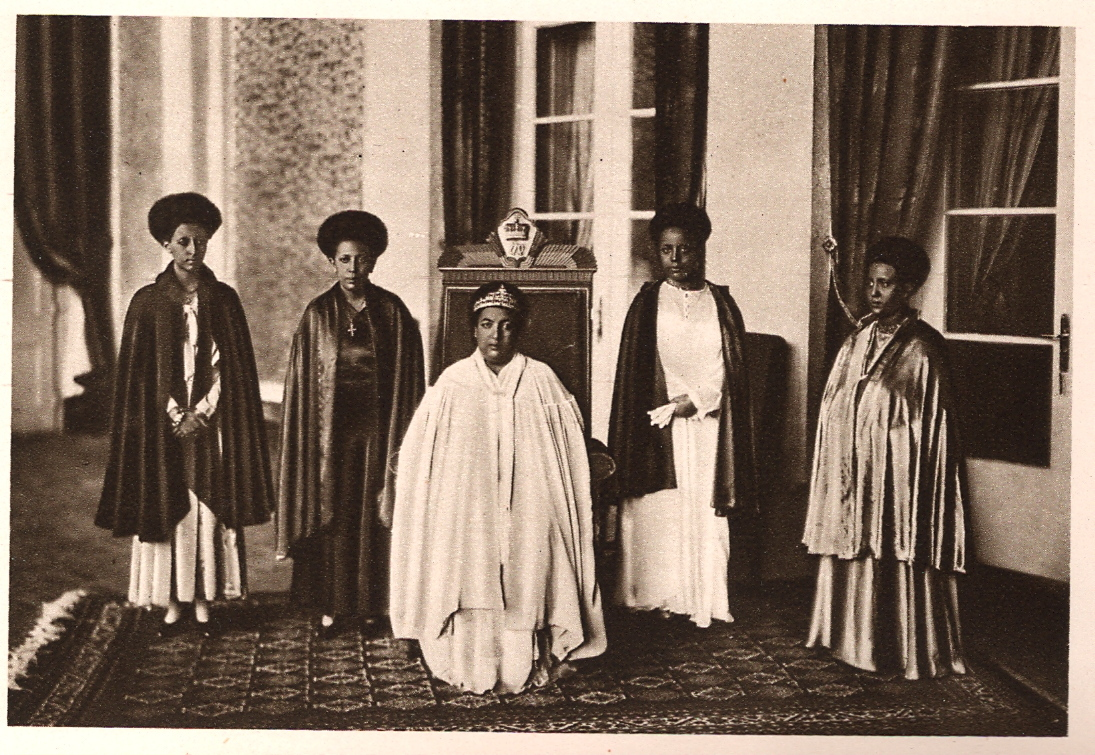
Empress Menen Asfaw seated in the centre and Standing women from left to right are Princess Tsehai, Princess Tenagnework, and Princess Zenebework, her daughters, and on the far right is Princess Wolete Israel Seyoum, her daughter-in-law.

Princess Tenagnework died in Addis Ababa on 6 April 2003. On 13 April, a funeral mass for the Princess was led by Abune Paulos, Patriarch of the Ethiopian Church, and was attended by most of the other hierarchs of the Ethiopian Church. Much of the old Ethiopian nobility and many members of the general public attended. She was buried in the crypt of Holy Trinity Cathedral in Addis Ababa near the graves of her family.

== Patronages ==
- President of the Ethiopian Women's Charitable Works Association (1941–1974).
- Patron of the Sebeta School and Center for the Blind.

== Honours ==
=== National dynastic honours ===
(Ethiopia) House of Solomon:

- - Knight Grand Collar of the Imperial Order of Solomon
- - Knight Grand Cordon of the Imperial Order of the Seal of Solomon
- - Knight Grand Cordon with Collar of the Imperial Order of the Queen of Sheba
- - Recipient of the Refugees Medal
- - Recipient of the Emperor Haile Selassie I Coronation Medal
- - Recipient of the Silver Anniversary Medal of Emperor Haile Selassie I and Empress Menen
- - Recipient of the Emperor Haile Selassie I Ruby Jubilee and 75th Birthday Medal

=== Foreign honours ===
- Belgium: Grand Cross of the Order of the Crown
- Denmark: Grand Cross of the Order of Dannebrog
- France: Grand Cross of the Order of the Legion of Honour
- (Kingdom of Greece) Greek Royal Family: Dame Grand Cross of the Royal Order of Beneficence
- Japan: Dame Grand Cordon of the Order of the Precious Crown
- Netherlands: Knight Grand Cross of the Order of the Gold Lion of the House of Nassau
- Norway: Knight Grand Cross of the Order of Saint Olav
- Spain: Sash of the Order of Isabella the Catholic
- United Kingdom: Honorary Dame Grand Cross of the Order of the British Empire

== Ancestry ==
Ancestors of Princess Tenagnework

8. Dejazmach Wolde Mikael Wolde Malakot
4. Ras Mäkonnen Wäldä-Mika'él
9. Immabet Tenagnework Sahle Selassie
2. Emperor Haile Selassie I
10. Dejazmach Ali Abba Jifar
5. Woizero Yeshimebet Ali
11. Immabet-Hoy Walatta Ihata Giyorgis Yimeru
1. Princess Tenagnework of Ethiopia
6. Dejazmach Asfaw Mikael, Jantirar of Ambassel
3. Itege Menen Asfaw
14. Negus Mikael
7. Woizero Sehin Mikael
15. Woizero Fantaye
