= Mengesha =

Mengesha (Amharic: መንገሻ, romanized: məngɨšə) is an Ethiopian male given name and surname. It derives from Amharic: መንግሥት, romanized: ˈmənɡɨst, which means "kingdom, royal".

== Given name ==
- Mengesha Seyoum (born 1927), member of the Solomonic dynasty
- Ras Mengesha Yohannes (1868–1906), governor of Tigray
- Stefanos Mengesha Seyoum (born 1952), prince of Ethiopia and Imperial Chancellor

== Surname ==
- Araya Mengesha, Canadian actor
- Milkesa Mengesha (born 2000), Ethiopian athlete
- Nigist Mengesha, Ethiopian-Israeli community activist and social worker
- Seyoum Mengesha (1887–1960), Ethiopian army commander and member of the royal family of the Ethiopian Empire
- Taddele Mengesha, Ethiopian footballer
- Weyni Mengesha, Canadian director
