= Seyoum =

Seyoum is a name. Notable people with the name include:

- Seyoum Mengesha (1887–1960), Ethiopian army commander
- Seyoum Mesfin (1949–2021), Ethiopian politician
- Seyoum Tesfaye, Ethiopian footballer
- Seyoum Tsehaye (born 1952), Eritrean journalist
- Bewketu Seyoum, Ethiopian writer
- Billene Seyoum (born 1982), Ethiopian politician
- Estifanos Seyoum (born 1947), Eritrean politician
- Fentahun Seyoum (born 1971), Israeli politician
- Mengesha Seyoum (born 1927), Ethiopian prince
- Stefanos Mengesha Seyoum (born 1952), Ethiopian prince
- Wolete Israel Seyoum (1907–1989), Ethiopian princess
- Yanet Seyoum (born 1994), Ethiopian swimmer
