= Sophia Desta =

Princess Sophia Desta
- Princess of Ethiopia
- Born: 25 January 1934; Ethiopian Empire
- Died: 11 November 2021 (age 87); Greater London
- Spouse: Captain Dereje Haile Mariam
- Issue: Emebet Hannah Mariam Meherete Selassie Dereje
Names
- Immabet Sophia
- House: House of Solomon
- Father: Ras Desta Damtew
- Mother: Princess Tenagnework
- Religion: Ethiopian Orthodox Tewahedo

Princess Sophia Desta (25 January 1934 – 11 November 2021) was the youngest daughter of Ras Desta Damtew and Princess Tenagnework Haile Selassie, and granddaughter of Emperor Haile Selassie I of Ethiopia. She was educated at Clarendon School for Girls in the United Kingdom together with her three sisters, Aida, Hirut Desta (Ruth) and Sebel. Princess Sophia was imprisoned, mistreated and humiliated in the Alem Bekagn Kerchele prison, Addis Ababa together with her sisters, other princesses of the Imperial Family, from 1974 until 1988.

She was the widow of Captain Dereje Haile Mariam, graduate of the Royal Military Academy Sandhurst in the U.K. She married him at Addis Ababa, on 31 January 1959 (in a double wedding with her sister Princess Seble-Wengel Desta). Captain Dereje Haile Mariam was born in 1936 and he was killed at Addis Ababa, at the Genuete Luel Palace while defending the Emperor against a palace coup d'état carried out by General Mengistu Newaye, head of the Imperial bodyguard on 16 December 1960. They had an only daughter:

- Emebet Hannah Mariam Meherete Sellasie Dereje (born in February 1961, Addis Ababa) and educated at Clarendon School for Girls. She married Lij Aklog Asfaw, son of Woizero Daremelesh and Colonel Asfaw Habte Mariam. They had issue, one son:
  - Lij Desta Aklog born on October 4, 1994.

== Title, style and honours ==
=== Title ===
- 1 January 1934 – 11 November 2021: Her Royal Highness Princess Sophia Desta of Ethiopia

=== Honours ===
==== National dynastic honours ====
- (Ethiopia) House of Solomon: Knight Grand Cordon with Collar of the Order of the Queen of Sheba
- (Ethiopia) House of Solomon: Recipient of the Refugee Medal
- (Ethiopia) House of Solomon: Recipient of the Silver Anniversary Medal of Emperor Haile Selassie I and Empress Menen
- (Ethiopia) House of Solomon: Recipient of the Emperor Haile Selassie I Ruby Jubilee and 75th Birthday Medal

==== Foreign honours ====
- Cambodia: Knight Grand Cross of the Order of Queen Kossomak
- Spain: Knight Grand Cross of the Order of Isabella the Catholic

== Ancestry ==
Ancestors of Sophia Desta

8. Balambaras Ketena Abebe
4. Fitawrari Damtew Ketena
9. Woizero - -
2. Ras Desta Damtew
10. - -
5. -
11. Woizero - -
1. Immabet Sophia Desta
12. Ras Makonnen Woldemikael
6. Haile Selassie I
13. Woizero Yeshimebet Ali
3. Le'ult Tenagnework Haile Selassie
14. Dejazmach Asfaw Mikael
7. Itege Menen Asfaw
15. Woizero Sehin Mikael
