= Iskinder Desta =

Ethiopian naval officer (1934–1974)

Iskinder Desta KSS GCHT DMM OMRI
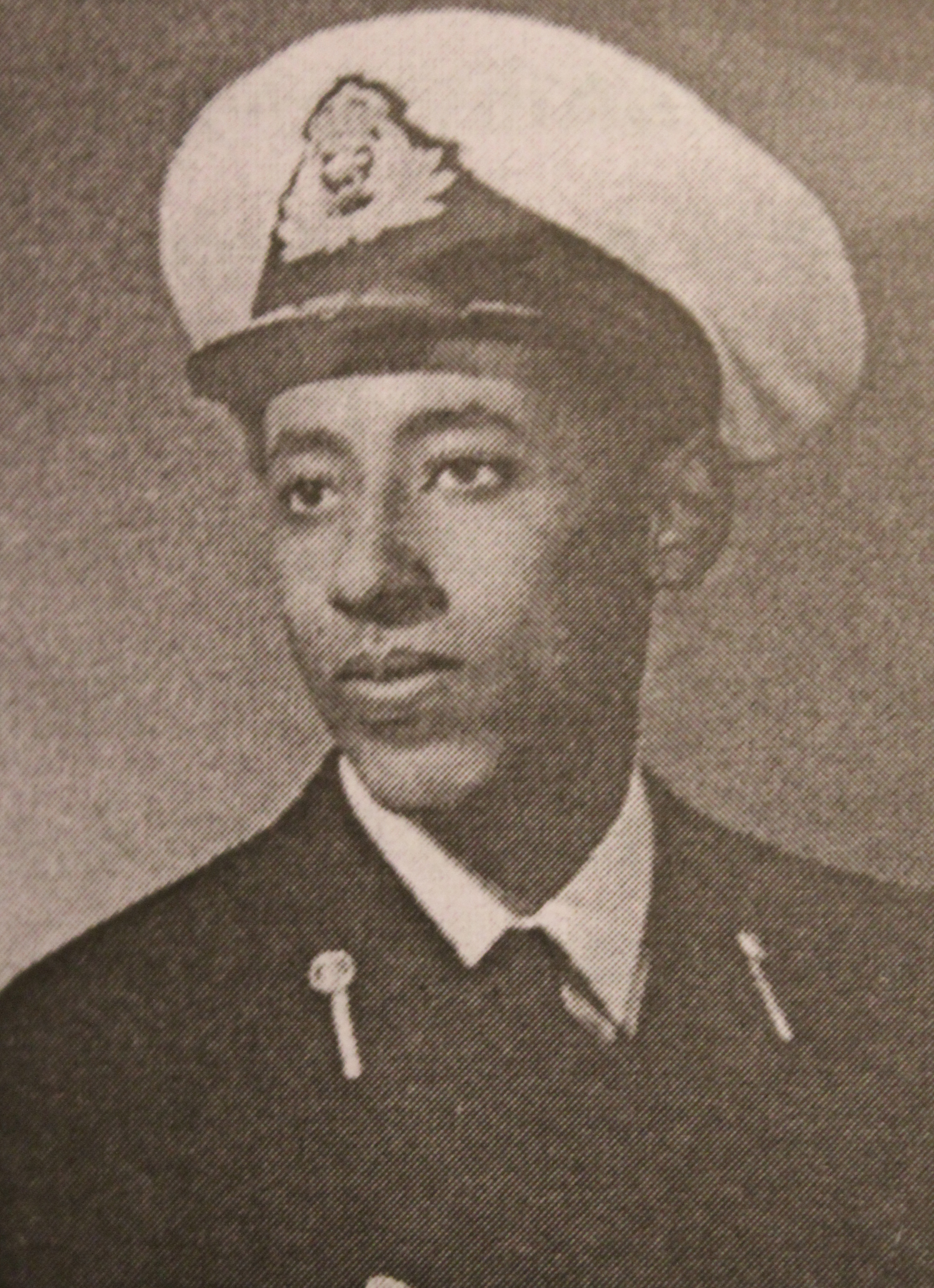
- Born: 6 August 1934; Addis Ababa, Ethiopian Empire
- Died: 23 November 1974 (aged 40); Akaki Central Prison, Addis Ababa, Ethiopia
- Spouse: Leult Sofia Amanuel
- Relatives: Naomi Iskinder (daughter); Princess Tenagnework (mother); Ras Desta Damtew (father); Haile Selassie I (grandfather)
- Military career
- Allegiance: Ethiopia
- Branch: Imperial Ethiopian Navy
- Service years: 1955–1974
- Rank: Rear admiral
- Commands: Deputy Commander, Imperial Ethiopian Navy
- Awards: Imperial Jubilee Medal; Grand Cross of St. Olav; Grand Cross of the Order of Merit of the Italian Republic

Rear Admiral Iskinder Desta (6 August 1934 – 23 November 1974) was an Ethiopian naval officer and member of the Ethiopian Imperial family. A grandson of Emperor Haile Selassie I, he served as the Deputy Commander of the Imperial Ethiopian Navy, its most senior officer, from 1958 until his execution by the Derg in 1974.

== Early life and education ==
(Prince) Iskinder (also Iskander/Eskander) was born on 6 August 1934 in Addis Ababa, the child of Ras Desta Damtew, a senior military commander and noble, and Princess Tenagnework, daughter of Emperor Haile Selassie I. In 1935, not long after his birth, the imperial family was forced to flee the Fascist Italian invasion into exile in Bath, Somerset; Ras Desta remained in the country to command the imperial forces fighting in the south of the country and was captured and executed in 1937. Iskinder was educated primarily in the United Kingdom, where he was a boarder at Wellington College between 1948 and 1951.

== Military career ==
In 1952, Iskinder entered the Britannia Royal Naval College as a cadet and passed out as a midshipman. In 1955, he was commissioned into the newly established Imperial Ethiopian Navy as a sub-lieutenant, and in 1958, at the age of 21, was made its Deputy Commander, with the rank of Commander. Despite his reputation as a "vigorous and progressive" commander and ties to the Imperial Family, Iskinder was a minor figure in Ethiopian politics. While some sources suggest that Iskinder was a possible successor to Emperor Haile Selassie, others maintain the emperor did not trust him and did not give him significant positions of responsibility. As a result Iskinder often performed minor governmental duties such as serving on the Executive Committee of the International Christian Fellowship and representing the Emperor at foreign royal events, such as in 1960, the celebrations for the 500th anniversary of the death of Prince Henry the Navigator in Portugal and the wedding of King Baudouin and Queen Fabiola of Belgium.

One source even claims that Iskinder worked to curry support among the officer corps and educated civilians by sponsoring scholarships in the 1960s and 1970s, and that on 14 September 1973, Eskinder hijacked the imperial plane and held the Emperor at gunpoint in an attempt to force a change to the succession. This is contradicted by others who maintain that the Prince remained close to his grandfather to the end, and had dinner with him almost daily.

Following a naval mutiny of 25–26 February 1974, he fled the naval base in Massawa, staying in Djibouti for a few weeks until called back to Addis Ababa on 8 March. On 12 September, when the Emperor was overthrown by the Derg, Iskinder was placed into detention by the military junta. He was one of sixty imperial officials executed on 23 November 1974.

== Personal life ==
He was married to Leult (Princess) Sofia Amanuel, daughter of 'Ato Amanuel Abraham, GCVO, Minister of Education. They had one daughter, Naomi Iskinder, born in 1969. Leult Naomi Iskinder reportedly married young. Opposed to her father, much of her life remains undocumented and shrouded in obscurity. Unverified sources suggest that the couple have one son, whom speculatively has been abroad

=== Ancestry ===
Ancestors of Iskinder Desta

8. Balambaras Ketena Abebe
4. Fitawrari Damtew Ketena
9. Woizero - -
2. Ras Desta Damtew
10. - -
5. -
11. Woizero - -
1. Prince Iskinder Desta
12. Ras Makonnen Woldemikael
6. Haile Selassie I
13. Woizero Yeshimebet Ali
3. Le'ult Tenagnework Haile Selassie
14. Dejazmach Asfaw Mikael
7. Itege Menen Asfaw
15. Woizero Sehin Mikael
