= Ethiopian Reconciliation Commission =

Truth and reconciliation commission created in Ethiopia

- Established: 25 December 2018 (8 years ago)
- Types: government commission
- Country: Ethiopia

The Ethiopian Reconciliation Commission is a truth and reconciliation commission created in Ethiopia in December 2018.

== Creation ==
In December 2018, the House of Peoples' Representatives (HoPR) voted overwhelmingly in favour of the creation of an Ethiopian Reconciliation Commission. The creation of the ERC was formally published in Federal Negarit Gazeta as Proclamation 1102/2018 on 5 February 2019, with the proclamation becoming law on 25 December 2018.

== Leadership and structure ==
In February 2019, the HoPR appointed 41 members to the Reconciliation Commission, including the Le'ul Ras Mengesha Seyoum, Berhanu Nega, Beyene Petros, Derartu Tulu, Goshu Wolde, Hailemariam Desalegn, Yetnebersh Nigussie, Zeresenay Alemseged and other religious figures, former politicians, intellectuals and philanthropists. A religious figure, Berhaneyesus Demerew Souraphiel, was chosen as president of the ERC.

== Aim and powers ==
The aim of the ERC, defined in Article 5 of Proclamation 1102/2018, is to "maintain peace[,] justice, national unity and consensus and also Reconciliation among Ethiopian Peoples."

The powers and duties of the ERC defined in Article 6 of the Proclamation include communication with varying social groups, identifying the origins of conflicts and human rights violations, considering both the victims' and offenders' points of view, the power to subpoena any document except for national security reasons, to visit any institution and obtain copies of documents found there, to summon any individual or group to give testimony, to get support from any federal or regional police force "depending on the situation", to notify the public and government agencies of the ERC's conclusions, and to "make Reconciliation among peoples to narrow the difference created and to create consensus."

=== Independence ===
Article 18 of Proclamation 1102/2018 formally requires the ERC to "perform its activities freely and independently".

=== Witness and whistleblower protection ===
Article 18 of Proclamation 1102/2018 defines protections for witnesses and whistleblowers.

== Actions ==
In October 2020, the ERC stated that it had documented 370 "traditional reconciliation and conflict resolution mechanisms". In the context of the increasing tension between the federal and Tigrayan governments, the ERC stated that it was trying to mediate, but that pre-conditions set by both sides had blocked progress.

== See also ==
- Ethiopian National Dialogue Commission, created in 2021
