= Seble Desta =

Princess Seble Desta
- Princess of Ethiopia
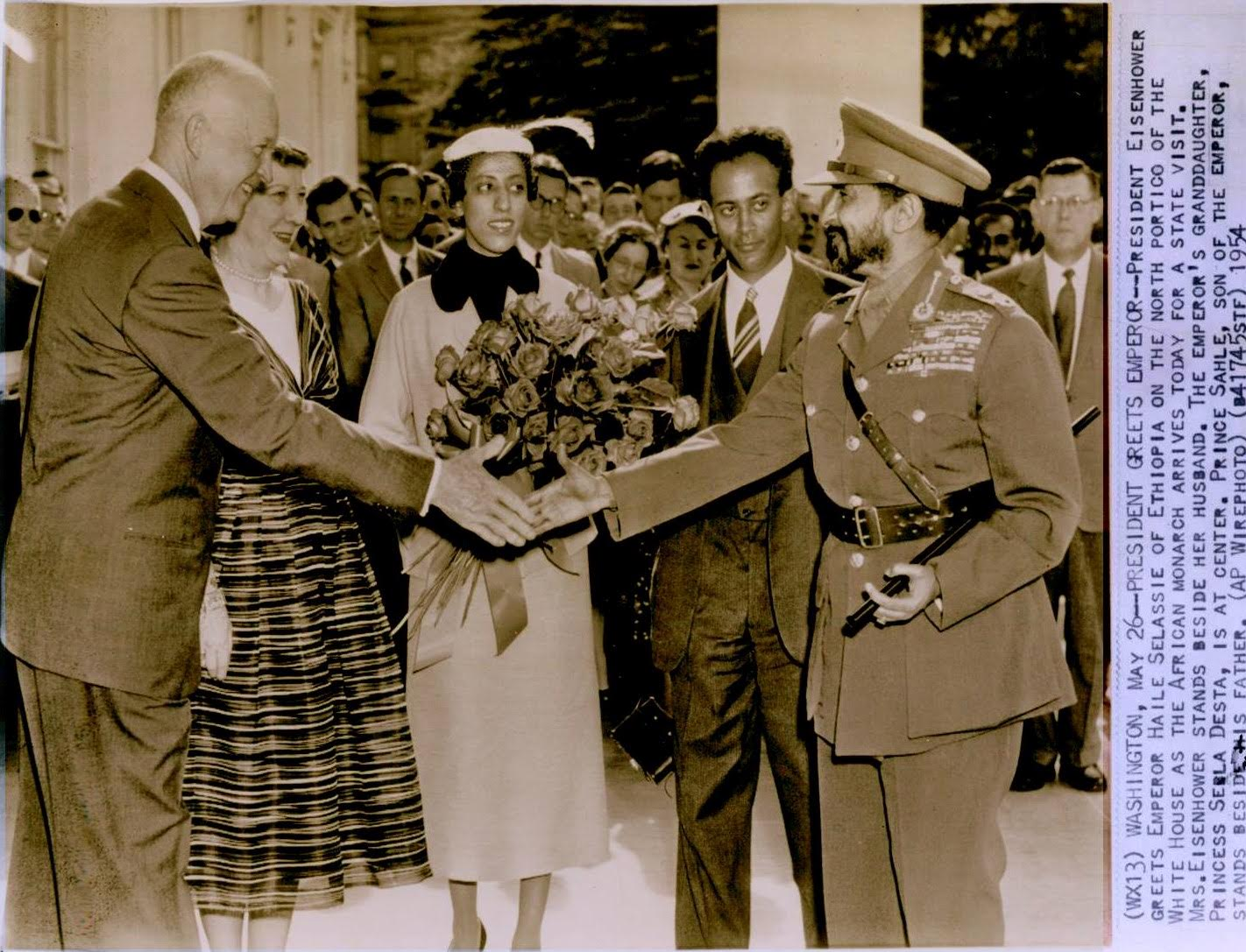
- Born: 1 September 1932; Addis Ababa, Ethiopian Empire
- Died: 3 January 2023 (aged 90); Virginia, U.S.
- Spouse: Dejazmach Kassa Wolde Mariam
- Issue: Lij Amha Kassa; Immabet Jote Kassa; Woizero Yeshimebet Kassa; Woizero Debritu Kassa; Woizero Kokeb Kassa
Names
- Immabet Sabla-Wangel
- House: House of Solomon
- Father: Desta Damtew
- Mother: Princess Tenagnework
- Religion: Ethiopian Orthodox Tewahedo

Princess Seble Desta (1 September 1932 – 3 January 2023) was a member of the Solomonic dynasty, which ruled Ethiopia until 1974. She was born in Addis Ababa, Ethiopia, and was the daughter of Princess Tenagnework Haile Selassie and Ras Desta Damtew, and granddaughter of Emperor Haile Selassie of Ethiopia and Empress Menen Asfaw. Princess Seble's paternal grandfather, Fitawrari Damtew Ketema, was martyred during the Ethiopian victory against the Italians at Adwa.

Princess Seble was one of eight children born to Princess Tenagnework, including Princess Aida Desta, Lij Amaha Desta (who died young), Princess Ruth Desta, Princess Sophia Desta, Rear Admiral Iskinder Desta, Emebet Mary Retta and Emebet Mentewab Andargatchew (who died in childhood).

During Mussolini's invasion of Ethiopia, Emperor Haile Selassie, Empress Menen and many members of their family were exiled in Bath, England. Princess Seble's father, Ras Desta, remained in Ethiopia fighting the Italians. In 1937, his location was betrayed and he was captured and killed, against all prisoner of war norms.

Princess Seble completed all of her education in England, initially at Clarendon School for Girls and attended Lady Margaret Hall College, Oxford University.

Princess Seble accompanied Emperor Haile Selassie on many state visits, including to the United States, Canada, Greece and Mexico and met with many heads of state, royalty, members of the public and celebrities. Like her mother and grandmother, Princess Seble was President of the Ethiopian Women's Welfare Association which, during her time, built a state of the art high-rise building in Addis Ababa to house young women safely and generate income for the Association.

In 1959, Princess Seble married Dejazmach Kassa Wolde Mariam, the Jote heir to the Welega kingdom of Leqa Qallam, in a double wedding with her sister, Princess Sophia Desta. Princess Seble and Dejazmach Kassa had five children, Yejoteworq Kassa, Yeshimebet Kassa, Laly (Debritu) Kassa, Kokeb Kassa and Amaha Kassa.

In 1974, the military junta overthrew Emperor Haile Selassie and imprisoned the Imperial Family, including Princess Tenagne Worq and her daughters. Princess Seble had recently given birth and was allowed to remain temporarily free. Until her imprisonment, she unsuccessfully sought help for the Emperor and the imprisoned family members from various foreign embassies.

The junta, under the pretense of affording fair trials requested that members of the Imperial Family, members of the aristocracy, military, academics and Patriots come to the capital. Dejazmach Kassa, like most of the others, willingly came (in his case from overseas). Instead of fair trials, the junta had lured them into a death trap, imprisoning and subsequently murdering 60 of the prisoners in 1974. In 1975, the junta murdered Emperor Haile Selassie. In this carnage, Princess Seble lost her grandfather, uncles, husband and brother. Laly Kassa, Kokeb Kassa and Amaha Kassa escaped confinement and fled to the West in 1977.

The imprisoned Imperial family spent 14 years in jail, initially under house arrest and then under steadily worsening conditions, until they were locked in a 15-foot cell in Alem Bekagn (the end of the world) prison. After many years of campaigning by the British and other governments, human rights groups and especially the Destas' friends from school and college, the Imperial ladies were released in 1988.

Princess Seble and Dejazmach Kassa had six grandchildren; Adey Sara Kejela, Amman Samuel Kejela, Yonas Amha, Anna Amha, Kaleb Abeye and Aden Abeye.

Seble Desta died on 3 January 2023, at the age of 91.

== Honours ==
=== National honours ===
- Dame Grand Cordon of the Order of the Queen of Sheba.
- Imperial Coronation Medal (1930).
- Jubilee Medal (1955)
- Jubilee Medal (1966).

=== Foreign honours ===
- Honorary Dame Commander of the Royal Victorian Order (United Kingdom, 1 January 1965).

== Ancestry ==
Ancestors of Seble Desta

8. Balambaras Ketena Abebe
4. Fitawrari Damtew Ketena
9. Woizero - -
2. Ras Desta Damtew
10. - -
5. -
11. Woizero - -
1. Immabet Seble Desta
12. Ras Makonnen Woldemikael
6. Haile Selassie I
13. Woizero Yeshimebet Ali
3. Le'ult Tenagnework Haile Selassie
14. Dejazmach Asfaw Mikael
7. Itege Menen Asfaw
15. Woizero Sehin Mikael
