= Fitawrari Qolech =

Ethiopian army commander (c. 1850–1930)

Qolech Fitawrari
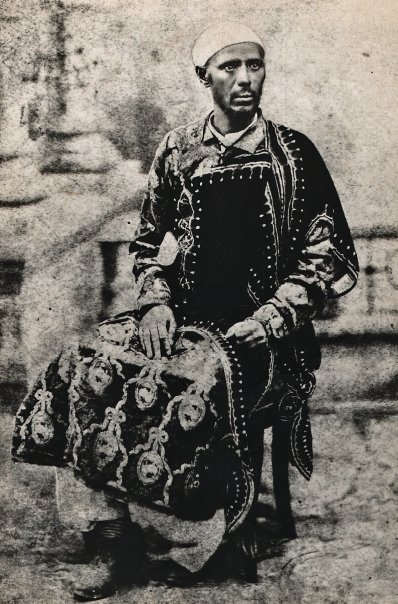

Personal details
- Born: circa 1850 Harar
- Died: circa 1930 Harar, Ethiopian Empire
- Occupation: Military officer; diplomat; court official

Military service
- Allegiance: Ethiopian Empire
- Years of service: 1890–1926
- Battles/wars: Menelik's Expansions: Battle of Chelenqo; First Italo-Ethiopian War: Battle of Amba Alagi; Battle of Mekelle; Battle of Adwa

Fitawrari Eshetu "Qolech" Bergualu (Amharic: እሸቱ "ቆለጭ" በርጓሉ; c. 1851 – 12 December 1926) also known by his nickname Qolech was an Ethiopian military commander.

== Military career ==
He served in various military campaigns during the first First Italo-Ethiopian War under Ras Mekonnen, later Governor of Harar, and the father of future emperor Haile Selassie.

== Later career ==
As a close and trusted officer, Fitawrari Qolech became a special companion to Ras Mekonnen and often accompanied the Ras during diplomatic visits to various parts of United Kingdom, Italy, France, Turkey, and German.

A notable moment is when Fitawrari Qolech accompanied Ras Mekonnen during a diplomatic visit to Italy around 1899. Ras Mekonnen traveled as Emperor Menelik II’s envoy to attend the funeral of King Umberto I and to strengthen diplomatic relations with the Italian government following the 1896 Battle of Adwa.

While in Harar, during Ras Mekonnen's reign as Governor of Harar, Fitawrari Qolech was appointed as caretaker to the Ras's young son, Lij Tafari. As a loyal member of the royal household through the years, he later became special counselor to Lij Tafari, who succeeded his father as Governor of Harar and became Ras Tafari.

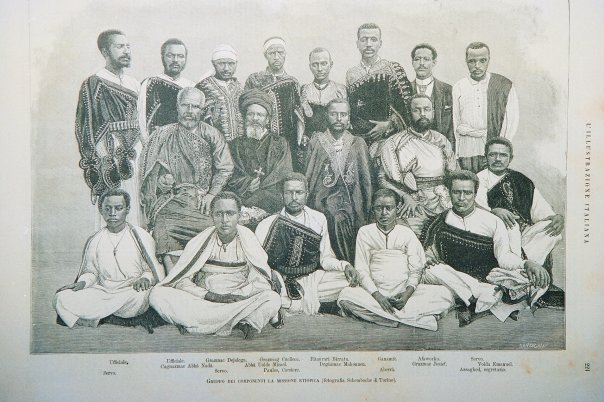
Fitawrari Qolech is seen here standing in the back, fourth from the left, as he accompanied Ras Makonnen Wolde Mikael during the diplomatic visit to Turin, Italy in September 1889.

== Legacy ==
There are areas in Harar and Gondar named after him. He is still today renowned for his wisdom, judiciary, and his military skills.

== See also ==
- Ethiopian historiography
- Ethiopian Empire
- List of emperors of Ethiopia
