= Congress for Dialogue and Consensus Building of Tigray =

2025 regional dialogue initiative in Tigray, Ethiopia

- ጉባኤ ዘተን ምርድዳእን ትግራይ
- Established: November 2025
- Founder: Interim Regional Administration of Tigray
- Type: Dialogue / Political reconciliation forum
- Purpose: Promote dialogue, reconciliation, consensus-building, and political reconstruction after the Tigray war
- Headquarters: Mekelle, Tigray, Ethiopia
- Region served: Tigray
- Key people: Abune Tesfasellassie Medhin (Secretary-General), Lt. Gen. Tadesse Werede (Interim Administration President)

The Congress for Dialogue and Consensus Building of Tigray (Tigrinya: ጉባኤ ዘተን ምርድዳእን ትግራይ) is a major regional political dialogue initiative established by the Interim Regional Administration of Tigray (IRA) in 2025. Established under IRA Regulation No. 29/2017, the Congress is tasked with addressing political divisions and rebuilding trust in the aftermath of the Tigray War.

The initiative, which organizers plan to convene in November 2025, is designed to bring together more than 2,300 participants from across Tigrayan society. This includes representatives from political parties, civil society organizations, professional associations, religious institutions, and the Tigrayan diaspora.

== Background and Rationale ==
Following the 2020–2022 Tigray War and the signing of the Pretoria Peace Agreement, the Interim Administration sought mechanisms to mend political fragmentation and restore stability in the region.

At its launch in September 2025, IRA President Lt. Gen. Tadesse Werede described the Congress as a "historic opportunity" for Tigrayans to achieve healing and a comprehensive political settlement. The General Secretary, Abune Tesfaselassie Medhin, Catholic Bishop of Adigrat, stressed the importance of inclusivity and the principle that “any idea should be heard” to guide the region towards hope and recovery.

The Congress operates concurrently with, but separately from, the federal Ethiopian National Dialogue Commission (ENDC). The ENDC has repeatedly stated that its national process cannot be complete or credible without meaningful participation from Tigray. However, establishing a functioning national dialogue structure in the region has proven challenging, with the ENDC reporting a "deadlock" in late 2025.

== Launch of the Congress ==
The congress was formally unveiled in September 2025, described by regional officials as a “historic opportunity” for healing and reconstruction. Abune Tesfaselasse Medhin, the congress's Secretary-General, emphasized broad participation and the principle that “any idea should be heard.” Lt. Gen. Tadesse Werede, President of the Interim Administration, supported the initiative while cautioning that unresolved political issues must be addressed to ensure credibility and trust.

== Criticism and Controversy ==
The legitimacy and independence of the Congress have been strongly contested by several regional opposition parties regarding its legitimacy, independence, and inclusiveness, particularly because it was initiated by the Interim Administration rather than a neutral, consensus-based body.

- The Salsay Woyane Tigray (SaWeT) party, through its Chairman Kinfe Hadush, rejected the initiative, labeling it a "deceptive ploy that violates international norms of dialogue." SaWeT argued that the process suffers from a “birth defect” of legitimacy because it was formed "without genuine, broad-based consultation." The party insisted that the only viable path forward is a "genuine and all-inclusive national dialogue."
- The Tigray Independence Party (TIP) Chairman Dejen Mezgebe called the conference an "important step" but maintained that the way it was initiated affected its legitimacy. TIP warned that key political actors remain unengaged or skeptical and raised specific concerns over the potential for manipulation in the selection of community representatives at the local tabia level.
- The Movement for Change in Tigray also criticized the selection of the Congress's leadership, calling it a “unilateral decision” and asserting that the dialogue will fail unless all political forces accept its leadership and agenda.
- The Tigray People's Liberation Front (TPLF), while welcoming the platform for public discourse as "timely" at its September launch, maintained a cautious optimism, stating that it was "still too early to talk about the Congress at this stage."

== Relationship to National Dialogue ==
The ENDC has repeatedly stressed that national-level reconciliation cannot succeed without meaningful participation from Tigray. In 2025, the commission held outreach consultations in Mekelle, but later reported a “deadlock” in establishing a functioning dialogue structure in the region. The ENDC spokesperson also stated that the commission is working to ensure inclusivity by engaging diaspora communities, political parties withdrawing earlier, and even armed groups. Analysts and policy researchers argue that while the regional congress may contribute to easing tensions, broader national reconciliation requires addressing structural political grievances and ensuring a viable power-sharing arrangement.

== Significance and Challenges ==
The Congress for Dialogue and Consensus Building of Tigray represents the most comprehensive attempt at regional reconciliation and political reconstruction in Tigray following the conflict. Its success is critical for the region's stability, but it faces several challenges:

- Political Trust: The initiative's perceived impartiality is undermined by its direct establishment by the Interim Administration, leading to mistrust among opposition groups.
- Inclusivity and Representation: Ensuring that the 2,300+ delegates are genuinely representative of the broader population, including diaspora and armed groups, is a major operational and political hurdle.
- External Factors: Observers note that the incomplete implementation of the Pretoria Peace Agreement and the political fragmentation at both the regional and federal levels pose serious threats to the long-term viability of the peacebuilding process.

Despite these concerns, the involvement of respected figures like Abune Tesfaselassie Medhin and the inclusion of civil society and professional bodies are seen as potential strengths that could bolster the process's transparency and credibility.

== See also ==
- Tigray War
- Ethiopia–Tigray peace agreement
- Ethiopian National Dialogue Commission
- Tigray Independence Party
