= Seyoum Mengesha =

Ethiopian army commander (1887–1960)

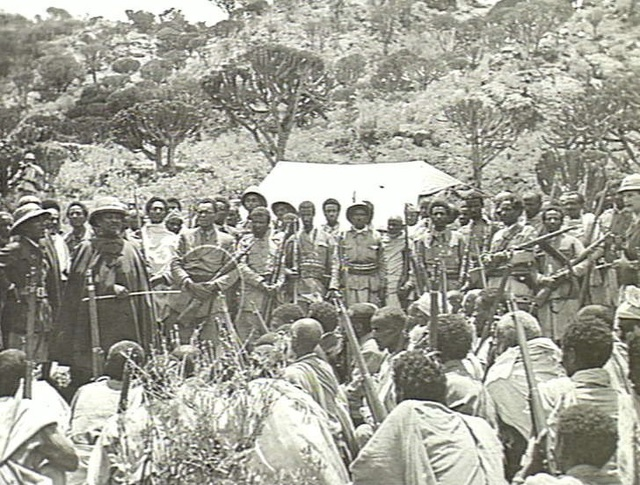
Seyoum Mengesha addressing his troops during the Battle of Amba Alagi.

Seyoum Mengesha KBE (Tigrinya: ሥዩም መንገሻ; 21 June 1886 – 15 December 1960) was a ras and member of the royal family of the Ethiopian Empire.

== Early life ==
Le'ul (Note: Roughly equivalent to Prince.) Ras Seyoum Mengesha was born on 24 June 1886 in the town of Agawmedir (Zimbriee), in the province of Gojjam to his mother Woizero Kafay, daughter of Ras Welle Betul Abba Tattan, Viceroy of Tigray. His father was Ras (Note: Roughly equivalent to Duke.) Mangasha Yohannes, the son of Emperor Yohannes IV of Ethiopia, from the royal house of Tigray. It is known that in his teenage years (1902-1910), Le'ul Ras Seyoum moved with his family from Gojjam to Tigray. His father, Ras Mangasha Yohannes was the "natural" son and heir of Emperor Yohannes IV. Because of his descent, Le'ul Ras Seyoum Mangasha was a rival to Emperor Menelik II, who had risen from ruling Shewa Province to become the Emperor upon Yohannes' death.

Le'ul Ras Seyoum wed Woizero (Note: Roughly equivalent to Lady.) Tewabech. Tewabech was the daughter of Negus Mikael of Wollo and the sister of Lij (Note: Roughly equivalent to Child.) Iyasu. Mikael was later honoured with the title of Negus (Note: Roughly equivalent to King.) and Iyasu was the uncrowned Emperor of Ethiopia.

Ras Seyoum fathered several children from various wives. With his first wife, Woizero Tewabech he had Leult (Note: Roughly equivalent to Princess.) Wolete Israel Seyum who herself married the Crown Prince, Asfaw Wossen. By a previous marriage he had Woizero-Hoy (Note: Roughly equivalent to Great Dame.) Kebbedech Seyum. By a subsequent marriage he had Leul Mengesha Seyoum. In the period 1928-1929 following a long and romantic courtship with Princess Atsede Asfaw Darge from the royal house of Shoa, the couple married and remained devoted until Le'ul Ras Seyoum's death during the coup of 1960.

From 1910 to 1935, Le'ul Ras Seyoum Mengesha was the Shum (Note: Roughly equivalent to Governor.) of western Tigray Province. Traditionally the governors of the provinces commanded the provincial Sefari (Note: Roughly equivalent to Armed Forces.) in battle.

In the spring of 1924, LeulRas Seyoum Mengesha, Ras Hailu Tekle Haymanot of Gojjam Province, Ras Mulugeta Yeggazu of Illubabor Province, Ras Makonnen Endelkachew, and Blattengeta Heruy Welde Sellase accompanied Ras Tafari Makonnen of Shewa Province on his European tour. Tafari Makonnen was the Crown Prince and Enderase (Note: Roughly equivalent to Regent.) of Ethiopia and was not yet crowned as Emperor Haile Selassie I. The group of Ethiopian royalty visited Jerusalem, Cairo, Alexandria, Brussels, Amsterdam, Stockholm, London, Geneva, and Athens. With them they took six lions which were presented to various zoos and dignitaries. In the same year, Seyum Mangasha was awarded the Knight Commander of the Order of the British Empire (KBE).

== Commander of the Army of Tigray ==
From October 1935 to February 1936, as Ras (Note: Roughly equivalent to Commander of the Army.) during the Second Italo-Ethiopian War, Le'ul Ras Seyoum Mengesha commanded the Army of Tigray. When General Emilio De Bono initially invaded Ethiopia, he was ordered to stay a day's march away from the advancing Italians. Le'ul Ras Seyoum and forces under his command played significant roles in the Ethiopian Christmas Offensive, the First Battle of Tembien, and the Second Battle of Tembien. For seven long months, Le'ul Ras Seyoum and his army from Tigray were the only force preventing the Italians from invading Ethiopia from Eritrea, and it was not until 1936 when the fighting moved to Maitcho that the emperor sent reinforcements to assist Le'ul Ras Seyoum and his men. The subsequent failure of Ethiopian forces to prevent the Italians from invading resulted in the Italian occupation of Ethiopia; Le'ul Ras Seyoum and a small contingent of Ethiopian nobility were taken to Italy as prisoners of war.

Le'ul Ras Seyoum, his wife Princess Atsede Asfaw and youngest child, son Dejasmatch Mengesha Seyoum were accompanied by close family members during their two-year captivity as prisoners of war. Their Italian captors accorded the family decent treatment and it was during this time that Le'ul Ras Seyoum and the Duke of Aosta developed a friendship that would later aid the return of Le'ul Ras Seyoum and his family to Ethiopia upon the appointment of the Duke as Viceroy to Ethiopia. Furthermore, his friendship with the Viceroy enabled Le'ul Ras Seyoum to play an influential role in securing the release of 3,000 Ethiopian POWs being held in Italian Somaliland.

In the period leading to the Italian withdrawal from Ethiopia, when Britain had committed forces to assist Ethiopia to liberate herself from Italian occupation, Le'ul Ras Seyoum led an army of 70,000 from Tigray in the fight to free the northern provinces from Italian forces. In 1941, following the complete liberation of Ethiopia from Italian occupation, he returned to the Capital Addis Abeba where he was formally re-appointed 'Teklay Gejee of Tigray' (Governor of Tigray Province), and remained in Addis Abeba until 1941 when he was given leave to return to Tigray until the 'Woyane Rebellion', which resulted in his return to the capital, Addis Abeba, where he resided under a form of 'house arrest'.

While many chose to flee into exile, Ras Seyum stayed and submitted to the Italians during the Italian occupation of Ethiopia. He spent much of his time under "house arrest" in Addis Ababa.

== Woyane Rebellion ==
In 1943, the "Woyane rebellion" broke out in southern and eastern Tigray Province and Ras Seyoum was suspected of supporting the rebels. As a consequence, he was recalled to Addis Ababa and replaced by Fitawrari (Note: Roughly equivalent to Commander of the Vanguard.) Kifle Dadi and Dejazmach (Note: Roughly equivalent to Commander if the Gate.) Fikre Selassie Ketema as well as General Tedla Mekeonen and General Isayas Gebre Selassie as the Commander of the Army in Tigray.

In 1947, Le'ul Ras Seoyum Mengesha was made Shum of eastern Tigray as well as western Tigray. This was because of the treason of the son of the late Ras Gugsa Araya Selassie, Dejazmach Haile Selassie Gugsa. In 1935, Haile Selassie Gugsa had defected to the Italians during the early days of the war. The Italians had made much propaganda use out of the fact that Haile Selassie Gugsa was the husband of Leult Zenebework Haile Selassie and therefore Haile Selassie's son-in-law. As a result, Ras Seyoum Mangasha was Shum of all Tigray Province, which he held until 1960.

== Death ==
In December 1960, the Imperial Guard (Kebur Zabangna) launched a coup d'état and seized power in Ethiopia while the Emperor was on a visit to Brazil. The coup leaders compelled the Crown Prince to read a prepared radio statement. In the statement, he accepted the crown in his father's place and announced a government of reform. However, the regular Army and the Ethiopian Orthodox Church both refused to accept the new government. The leader of the church, Patriarch Abuna Basilios, issued an anathema against all those who cooperated with the coup leaders. The Emperor returned to Ethiopia and the Army stormed the palace where members of the government were being held prisoner by the Imperial Guards. The Guards fled, but not before killing many members of the government and the nobility that had been held prisoner in the Green Salon of the palace. Leul Ras Seyoum was among those who were machine gunned to death, he was 74 years old and was buried in Axum.

== Aftermath ==
Le'ul Ras Mengesha Seyoum, as son and heir of the late Le'ul Ras Seyoum Mengesha, inherited his father's legacy in representing the Tigrean Royal House of Yohannes IV.

== Honours ==
=== National honours ===
- Grand Collar and Chain of the Order of Solomon.
- Knight Grand Cross of the Order of the Seal of Solomon.
- Knight Grand Cross of the Order of the Star of Ethiopia.
- Grand Officer of the Order of Menelik II.
- Grand Officer of the Order of the Holy Trinity.

=== Foreign honours ===
- (United Kingdom) : Knight Commander of the Order of the British Empire (8 July 1924).
- (France) : Knight Grand Cross of the Order of the Black Star (16 May 1924).
- (Vatican City) : Knight Grand Cross of the Order of St. Gregory the Great (19 May 1924).
- (Luxembourg) : Knight Grand Cross of the Order of Adolphe of Nassau (24 May 1924).
- (Sweden) : Commander Grand Cross of the Order of the Polar Star (10 June 1924).
- (Belgium) : Grand Cordon of the Order of Leopold (1924).
- (Greece) : Knight Grand Cross of the Order of the Redeemer.
- (France) : Grand Officer of the Order of the Legion of Honour.

== See also ==
- Monarchies of Ethiopia
- Ethiopian aristocratic and court titles
- List of field marshals
- List of honorary British Knights
- Crown Prince Asfaw Wossen - Son-in-law
- Aberra Kassa - Son-in-law
- Aida Desta - Daughter-in-law
- Stefanos Mangasha Seyum - Grandson of Seyum Mangasha and son of Mangasha Seyum

== Notes ==
Footnotes

Citations
