= Ethiopian Civil Society Organizations Council =

Statutory umbrella body for civil society organizations in Ethiopia

The Ethiopian Civil Society Organizations Council (ECSOC) is a statutory umbrella body that represents and coordinates civil society organizations (CSOs) in Ethiopia. It was established under the Organizations of Civil Societies Proclamation No. 1113/2019 and held its first General Assembly on 31 December 2020. The Council is mandated to represent the country's civil society sector, enact and enforce a sector-wide code of conduct, and advise the Authority for Civil Society Organizations (ACSO) on the registration and administration of CSOs.

== Background and establishment ==
The Council was created under the Organizations of Civil Societies Proclamation No. 1113/2019, legislation that replaced the more restrictive 2009 Charities and Societies Proclamation, which had limited the ability of foreign-funded organizations to work on human rights, advocacy and governance. Article 85 of the proclamation provided for the establishment of a council governed by the participation of all CSOs in Ethiopia and tasked with representing and coordinating the sector. Its first General Assembly, held on 31 December 2020, brought together 300 CSO representatives who served as the Council's founders and elected a 21-member Executive Committee.

== Structure ==
ECSOC operates as an independent apex body and describes itself as representing organizations, consortia, associations, forums and networks across the civil society sector. As of 2022 it reported representing more than 3,700 CSOs, a figure that has grown in subsequent years. Its highest decision-making organ is the General Assembly, which elects the Executive Committee that leads the Council's work, supported by a secretariat headed by an executive director. Under the proclamation, the Council is empowered to enact a code of conduct for the sector and devise enforcement mechanisms, advise ACSO on the registration and administration of CSOs, and represent and coordinate civil society. It draws its budget from members' contributions and other lawful sources.

== Activities ==
ECSOC has positioned itself as a coordinating actor in Ethiopia's national dialogue process. In 2022 it established a National Reference Group of experts and civil society organizations and convened consultation meetings to define how the sector would engage with the Ethiopian National Dialogue Commission; its then executive director, Henok Melese, said the Council was developing an engagement framework and code of ethics to govern the interaction. In December 2025 the Council's president, Ahmed Hussein, publicly urged citizens to take part in the national dialogue, describing it as an opportunity to build national consensus.

Ahead of Ethiopia's seventh general election, scheduled for 1 June 2026, the Council reported intensifying nationwide activities intended to support a peaceful and credible vote, including a mechanism to document and monitor campaign promises made by political parties. Executive director Getnet Kaba stated that the Council remained politically neutral and represented neither the government nor any political party.
