= Desta Damtew =

Ethiopian general and noble (1892–1937)

- Ras
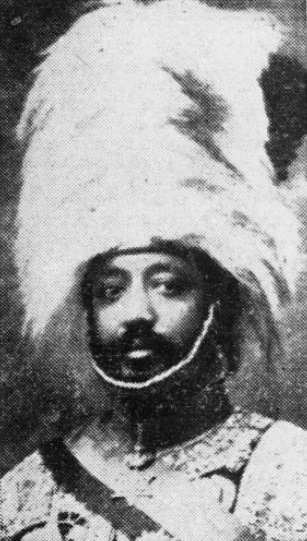
- Born: 1892; Meskane, Shewa, Ethiopian Empire
- Died: 24 February 1937 (aged 44–45); Butajira, Italian East Africa
- Burial: Holy Trinity Cathedral
- Spouse: Princess Tenagnework
- Issue: Amha Desta; Iskinder Desta; Aida Desta; Seble Desta; Sophia Desta; Hirut Desta
- Father: Fitawrari Damtew Ketena
- Religion: Ethiopian Orthodox Tewahedo Church

Ras Desta Damtew KBE (Amharic: ደስታ ዳምጠው; c. 1892 – 24 February 1937) was an Ethiopian noble, army commander and a son-in-law of Emperor Haile Selassie I. He is known for his leadership in the Ethiopian Army during the Second Italo-Ethiopian War. He was executed on 24 February 1937 by the Italians shortly after Ethiopia's loss in the war.

== Biography ==
Born in the village of Meskane (in the contemporary East Gurage Zone), Desta Damtew was the second son of Fitawrari Damtew Ketena. His older brother was Abebe Damtew. In 1896, Fitawrari Damtew Ketena was killed at the Battle of Adwa. As boys, Lij Desta Damtew and his brother Lij Abebe Damtew served at the Imperial Palace in Addis Ababa as pages to Emperor Menelik II and Empress Taitu Bitul. Desta Damtew went on to serve in the Dowager Empress Taitu's household at the Palace on Mt. Entoto after the death of Menelik II.

In 1916, Desta Damtew supported Tafari Makonnen against Lij Iyasu. Tafari Makonnen was the future Emperor Haile Selassie I. Lij Iyasu was deposed but escaped. In 1920, Desta Damtew was in the party that captured Lij Iyasu.

In 1924, Desta Damtew married Tafari Makonnen's daughter Leult Tenagnework Haile Selassie. They had four daughters and two sons.

Anthony Mockler describes Desta Damtew as "something of an eccentric among Ethiopian nobles", who had run away in his twenties to become a monk at Debre Libanos, as well as having a reputation "as an entrepreneur and an enfant terrible." Mockler continues that Ras Desta "had as little taste as the young progressives of inferior birth for the traditional amusements of the Amhara aristocracy, the feasting, the horsemanship, the boasting and the drunkenness."

According to his obituary in The Times he was a tall and princelike figure, ascetically handsome in face and reserved in manner. He had the soft, almost inaudible voice of the aristocratic Amhara. Although a modernizer on the Imperial pattern, he was perfectly frank about his distrust of foreigners. "The less foreigners visit Ethiopia, the better" was a remark he once made at a European gathering at the British Legation. Desta Damtew was considered a genius by many of his advisors and fellow-soldiers. He was educated in Ethiopia, Britain and Switzerland and spoke fluent Amharic, English, French, German and Italian, among other languages.

By 1928, Negus Tafari Makonnen appointed his son-in-law Desta Damtew as Dejazmach and as Shum of Kefa Province.

In 1931, Emperor Haile Selassie I appointed Desta Damtew as a Ras. In the same year, he was appointed Shum of Sidamo Province and of Borena Province. He succeeded Birru Wolde Gabriel in Sidamo.

In 1933, Ras Desta Damtew traveled to America to return the visit of the United States representative to the coronation of Haile Selassie. It was his only journey outside Ethiopia. He arrived in New York and was greeted with royal honours, later lunching with President Roosevelt.

In 1935, Ras Desta commanded troops along the southern border of Ethiopia during the Second Italo-Abyssinian War. In January 1936, he was defeated by the Italian General Rodolfo Graziani at the Battle of Ganale Dorya. Desta retreated back to his administrative center at Irgalem, where with the help of Dejazmach Gabremariam he reorganized his surviving supporters to resist the Italian advance. Desta continued to resist the Italians after the Emperor left the country. According to Bahru Zewde, Desta Damtew vacillated between surrender and continuing the struggle, but a group of Eritrean Ascaris who deserted from the Italian forces to join him forced him "to stick it out."

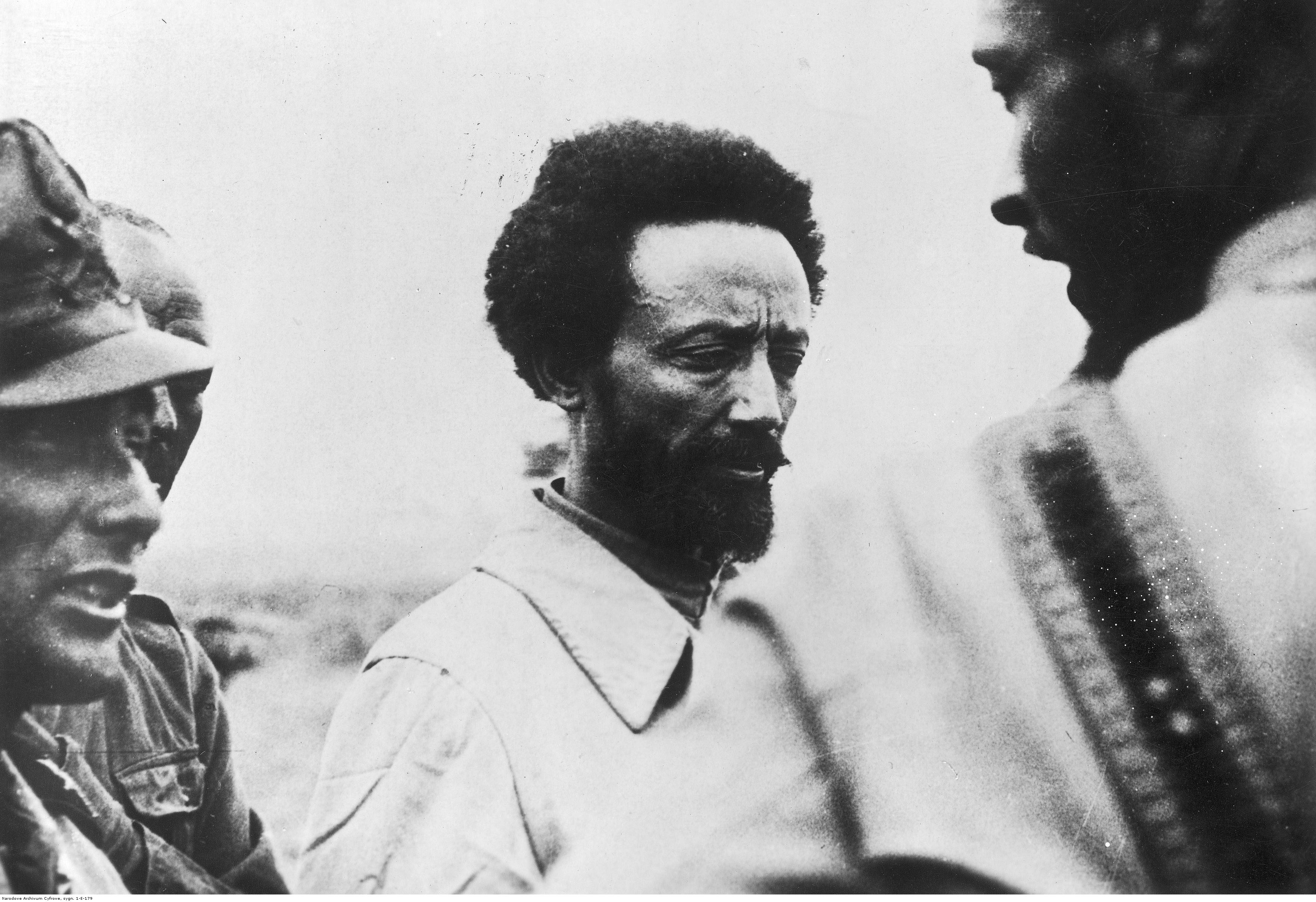
Ras Desta Damtew just before his execution

In 1936, after the end of the rainy season, Italian General Carlo Geloso, who had been appointed governor of the Italian province of Galla-Sidamo, advanced from the north to dislodge Ras Desta and Dejazmach Gabremariam. However, by the end of October, Geloso had not advanced very far or effectively. It was not until a month later when a second Italian column led by the Italian General Enea Navarini advanced from the south through the Wadara Forest that Ras Desta at last left Irgalem, which was occupied 1 December. With Dejazmach Gabremariam, Dejazmach Beyene Merid (Shum of Bale Province) and a dwindling number of soldiers, for the next few months Ras Desta eluded the Italians until they were trapped near Lake Shala in the Battle of Gogetti and annihilated. Wounded, Ras Desta managed to escape, only to be caught on 23 February 1937 by an irregular band of Tigrayans commanded by Captain Tucci. He then was brought to Butajira where he was immediately executed.

== Legacy ==
Following the liberation of Ethiopia from Italian occupation in 1941, the remains of Ras Desta Damtew were disinterred from the grave they were buried in by the Italians and moved to the Imperial family tombs in the crypt of Holy Trinity Cathedral.

In 1948, 10 Italian citizens were charged at the UN War Crimes Commission when the Ethiopian government submitted papers describing Damtew’s status as a prisoner of war, making his killing a war crime.

In 2024 it emerged that Demtwe's Imperial Order of the Star of Ethiopia medal had been stolen by an Italian soldier around the time of his execution and was being offered for sale by auction by a British collector living in Spain. Damtew's family demanded the return of the medal to Ethiopia for display at the National Museum of Ethiopia in Addis Ababa.

== Honours ==
=== National honours ===
- Knight Grand Cross of the Order of the Holy Trinity.
- Knight Grand Cross of the Order of Menelik II.
- Knight Grand Cross of the Imperial Order of the Star of Ethiopia.
- Imperial Coronation Medal (1930).

=== Foreign honours ===
- Grand Officer of the Order of the Legion of Honour (French Third Republic, 2 January 1932).
- Knight Commander of the Order of the British Empire (United Kingdom, 13 January 1932).

== See also ==
- Haile Selassie Gugsa – Another son-in-law of Haile Selassie
- Beyene Merid – Another son-in-law of Haile Selassie
- Nasibu Emmanual
- Princess Sophia Desta

== Notes ==
Footnotes

Citations
