= Jember Teferra =

Ethiopian development worker (1943–2021)

Jember Teferra (1943–2021) was an Ethiopian development worker, director of the Integrated Holistic Approach Urban Development Project in Addis Ababa and a great-niece of Emperor Haile Selassie.

== Life ==
Jember Teferra was born on 21 May 1943 in Madagascar, the daughter of Generemaria Tereffa and Shiferraw Tereff. Her great-uncle was Haile Selassie, the last emperor of Ethiopia. She attended primary school in Ethiopia, but received her secondary education at Clarendon School for Girls in the United Kingdom. She then studied nursing at Tunbridge Wells School of Nursing, becoming a registered nurse in 1965. She later studied for a master's degree in primary health care from the University of Manchester.

Returning to Ethiopia, Jember worked at St. Paul's Hospital, Ethiopia before working for the Red Cross. Her husband, Dr Hailegiorgis, was Mayor of Addis Ababa from 1969 to 1973. When the Derg seized power in 1974, both she and her husband were imprisoned. The pair would spend a total of 13 years in prison. While imprisoned, Jember opened a clinic and school in the prison.

In 1990 Jember started the Integrated Holistic Approach – Urban Development Project (IHA-UDP), a community development project tackling slum areas in Addis Ababa. Project staff, all Ethiopians, worked together with community representatives who set project priorities.

Jember Teferra lived in London from 2017. She died unexpectedly in hospital there on 14 January 2021.
