= Hirut Desta =

Princess Hirut Desta
- Princess of Ethiopia
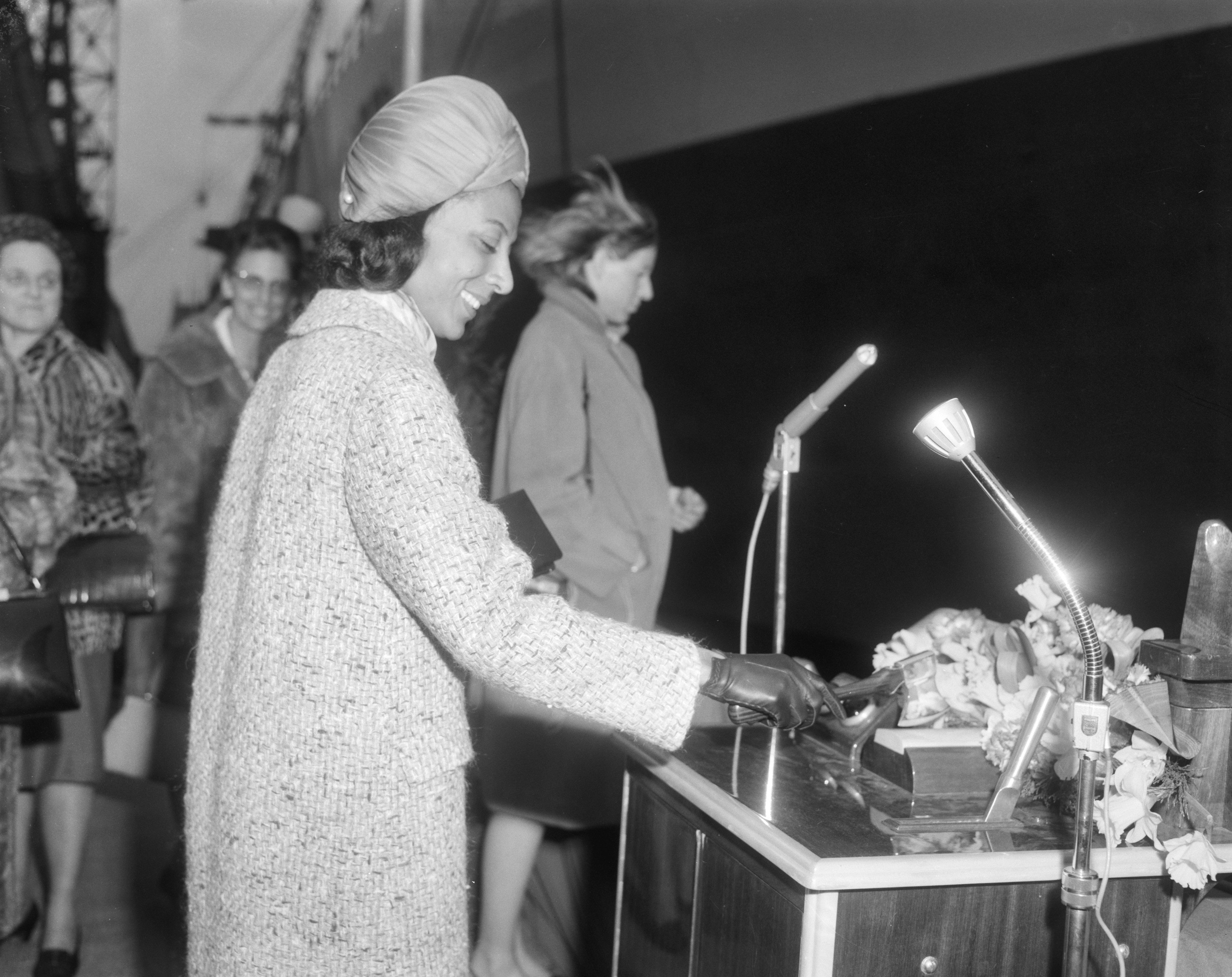
- Born: 20 April 1930; Ethiopian Empire
- Died: 2015 (aged 84–85); London
- Spouse: General Nega Tegegn
Names
- Immabet Hiruta Mariam
- House: House of Solomon
- Father: Desta Damtew
- Mother: Princess Tenagnework
- Religion: Ethiopian Orthodox Tewahedo

Princess Hirut Desta (also Princess Ruth Desta; 20 April 1930 - 2015) was the daughter of Ras Desta Damtew and Princess Tenagnework Haile Selassie, and granddaughter of Emperor Haile Selassie of Ethiopia. She was the widow of General Nega Tegegn, who was governor of the provinces of Begemder and Semien. She was described by Nathaniel T. Kenney as a "trim, most democratic of princesses," who "was not above grabbing a tool from a workman, I suspect, and showing him how to use it."

Princess Hirut was educated at the School of St Clare (renamed Bolitho School), Penzance, Cornwall, and at Clarendon School for Girls, Abergele, North Wales.

She volunteered at the Haile Selassie I University's Library and Rita Pankhurst who was one of the library's directors wrote about how helpful she was.

Desta was imprisoned by the Derg from 1974 until 1988. Princess Hirut Desta died in London aged 85 in 2015, and her funeral was conducted at the Holy Trinity Cathedral in Addis Ababa.

== Patronages ==
- President of the Committee for the Restoration of the Churches of Lalibela.

== Honours ==
=== National honours ===
- Dame Grand Cordon of the Order of the Queen of Sheba.
- Imperial Coronation Medal (1930).
- Jubilee Medal (1955).
- Jubilee Medal (1966).

== Ancestry ==
Ancestors of Hirut Desta

8. Balambaras Ketena Abebe
4. Fitawrari Damtew Ketena
9. Woizero - -
2. Ras Desta Damtew
10. - -
5. -
11. Woizero - -
1. Immabet Ruth Desta
12. Ras Makonnen Woldemikael
6. Haile Selassie I
13. Woizero Yeshimebet Ali
3. Le'ult Tenagnework Haile Selassie
14. Dejazmach Asfaw Mikael
7. Itege Menen Asfaw
15. Woizero Sehin Mikael
