= Order of the Holy Trinity (Ethiopia) =

Imperial house order of Ethiopia

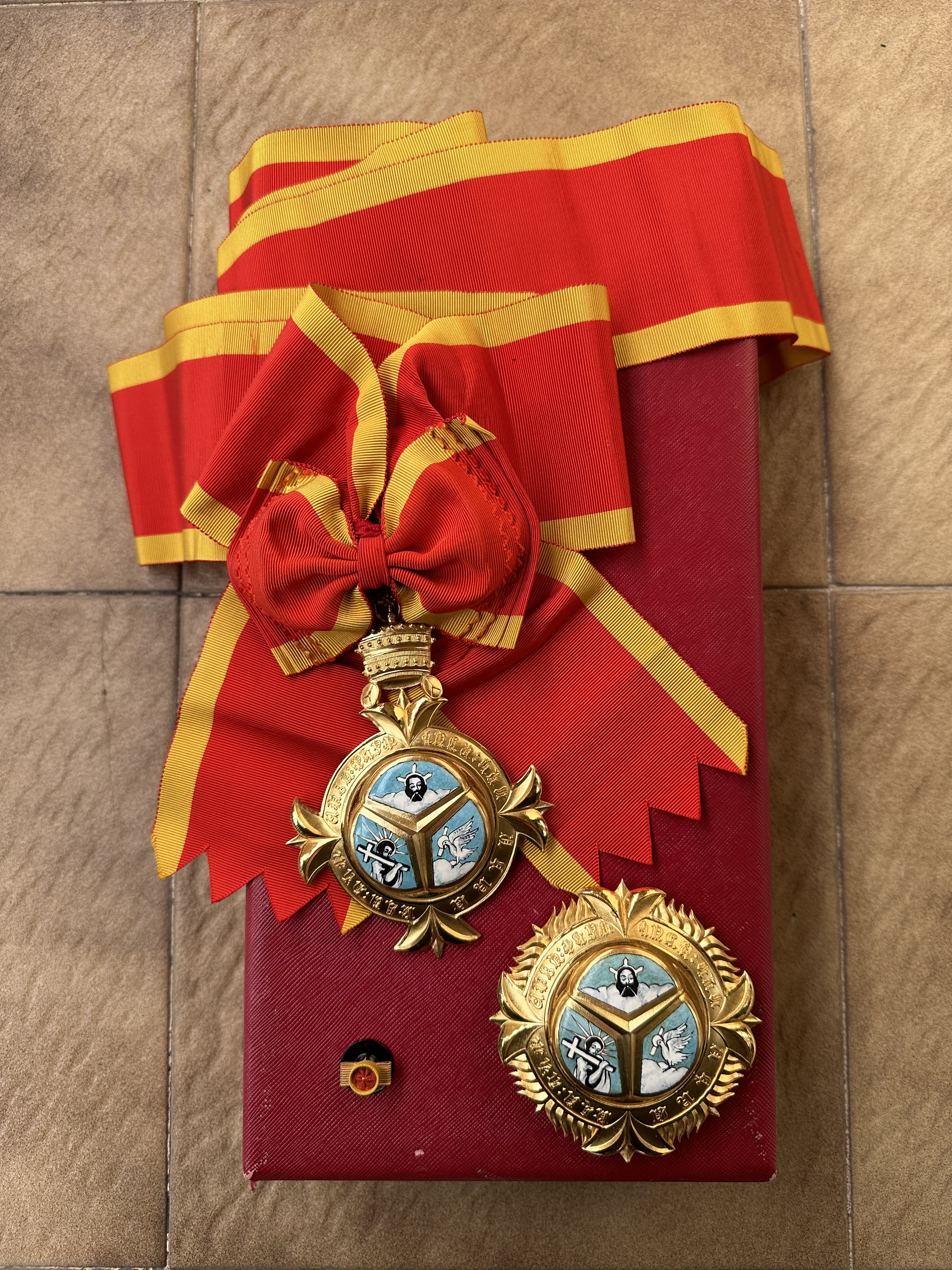
- Set of the Imperial Order of the Holy Trinity.

Awarded by Ethiopia
- Type: Dynastic order
- Established: 2 November 1930
- Royal house: Solomonic Dynasty
- Religious affiliation: Ethiopian Orthodoxy
- Ribbon: Red with yellow edges
- Eligibility: Ethiopian citizens and foreign nationals, both civilian and military
- Awarded for: Outstanding service to the Throne
- Grades: Grand Cross with Collar; Grand Cross
- Post-nominals: GCHT*; GCHT
- Former grades: Grand Cross; Grand Officer; Commander; Officer; Member

Precedence
- Next (higher): Order of the Queen of Sheba
- Next (lower): Order of Menelik II
- Ribbon bar of the order

The Order of the Holy Trinity is an Ethiopian house order, established by Haile Selassie I on 2 November 1930, to celebrate his coronation. It currently ranks as the fourth highest award in the Ethiopian order of precedence.

== History ==
Haile Selassie established the Order of the Holy Trinity on 2 November 1930, as a way to celebrate his coronation as Emperor of Ethiopia following the death of Empress Zewditu on 2 April. Initially established in five grades, it was only awarded to a select group of Ethiopian aristocracy, high-ranking clergy, and senior members of the Imperial Court. Eventually, the order was slimmed down to one grade, Grand Cross (with an additional Grand Collar to denote exceptionally extraordinary service), and made available to foreigners, both civilian and military. Following the fall of the Ethiopian monarchy in 1975, the Order of the Holy Trinity remained present in the Ethiopian honors system, under the custody of the Crown Council. The current Grand Master of the order is Prince Ermias Sahle Selassie, grandson of Haile Selassie, and current president of the Crown Council.

== Insignia ==
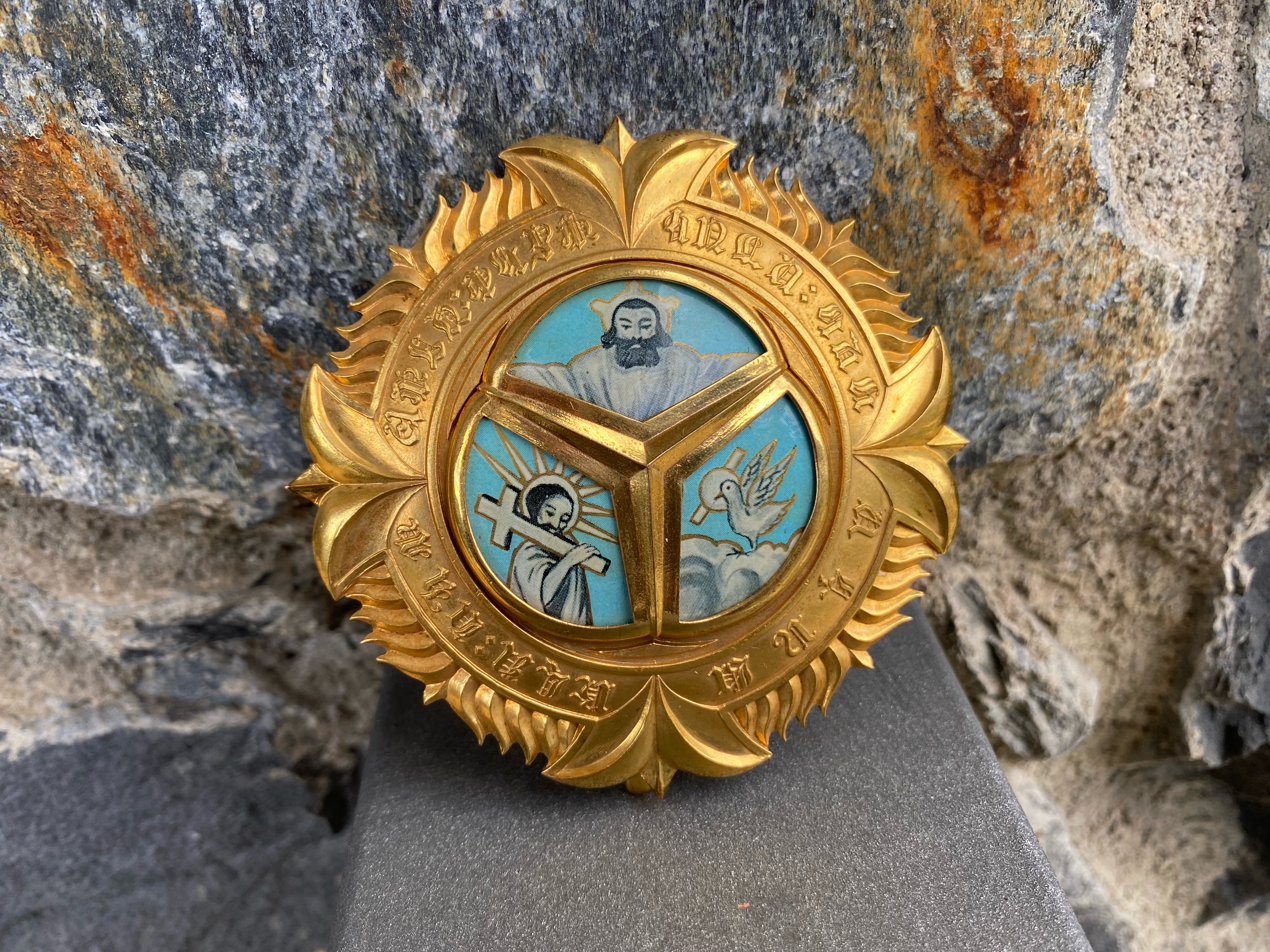
Star of the Order

The badge and breast star of the Order of the Holy Trinity are both circular bronze-gilt medallions, bearing the points of a cross fleury. On the face of each medallion is an enamel trilobe emblem, divided by a forked cross, with each lobe depicting an image of (counterclockwise from the top) God the Father, God the Son, or God the Holy Spirit. Circumscribing the inner emblem is an Amharic phrase, written using Ge'ez script. For the badge of the order, the entire medallion is suspended from the sash by a bronze-gilt Ethiopian Imperial crown.

== Notable recipients ==
- Abdul Haris Nasution
- Amha Selassie
- Desta Damtew
- George Mikhailovich of Russia
- Haile Selassie
- Konrad Adenauer
- Prince Makonnen
- Addison E. Southard
- Maxwell D. Taylor
- Seyum Mangasha
- William Westmoreland
- Zera Yacob Amha Selassie
- Amanuel Berhe - 1956

== See also ==
- Emperor of Ethiopia
- Solomonic dynasty
