= Clarendon School for Girls =

Girls' independent private school in the UK

Coordinates: 52°07′14″N 2°20′03″W

Information
- Established: 1898
- Closed: 1992 (merged with Monkton Combe School)
- Gender: Girls

Clarendon School for Girls was a girls' independent boarding school, which began in 1898 in Malvern, Worcestershire, England. It moved three times: first to Kinmel Hall near Abergele in Denbighshire in 1948 and then to Haynes Park in Bedfordshire in 1976 before merging with Monkton Combe School, near Bath, Somerset, in 1992.

== History ==
Clarendon School was established in a private house in North Malvern, Worcestershire in 1898 by Miss Amy Flint (1869-1941), assisted by her sisters Mary, Annie and Kate. The first pupils were seven boarders aged between six and sixteen. The Misses Flint were the daughters of an Evangelical Christian travelling preacher and embedded their strong Christian values and ethos in the day-to-day operation of their new school. Miss Amy Flint remained as headmistress of Clarendon School until her retirement in 1930, when the school had grown to contain forty-six pupils and occupy several more houses in the village.

During World War II, numbers grew to such an extent that new, larger premises had to be found. Some 150 girls were living in eleven houses around Malvern, and the school could not operate efficiently. Kinmel Hall, Abergele in Denbighshire was selected to house Clarendon School, with Sir John Laing stepping in to provide support. The school moved from Malvern to Abergele in twenty Pickfords removal lorries in April 1948 - its fiftieth anniversary year.

In 1956 the Clarendon School Trust was established, taking the school out of private ownership. In September 1975 a large fire devastated the central part of Kinmel Hall. Meanwhile, Hawnes House School at Haynes Park in Bedfordshire had become bankrupt and its fine buildings had become available. So in early 1976, Clarendon School moved to Haynes Park.

In 1992 Clarendon School agreed to merge with Monkton Combe School, an independent boys' school based just outside Bath, Somerset which had been founded in 1868. The two schools shared the same aims and Christian ethos and as Monkton Combe School had taken the decision to become fully co-educational that same year the merger was swift. The name of Clarendon School has been retained as the name of one of three girl's boarding houses at Monkton Combe School.

== List of Head Mistresses ==
The following have been Head Mistress of Clarendon:

| Name | Years as Head Mistress | Birth/death dates |
|---|---|---|
| Miss Amy Flint | 1898–1930 | 1868-1941 |
| Miss Edith G.R. Swain | 1930-1965 | 1897-1984 |
| Miss Sheila Haughton | 1965-1978 | |
| Miss Jean Howell | 1978-1990 | |
| Mrs Marjorie Crane | 1990-1991 | |
| Mrs Molly Dawson | 1991–1992 | |

== Notable Old Clarendonians ==
- Patricia St. John, 1919–1993, children's author and missionary, was a house mother at Clarendon School in the 1940s.
- Princess Aida Desta, 1927–2013, granddaughter of Emperor Haile Selassie of Ethiopia
- Princess Edjigayehu Asfawossen, granddaughter of Emperor Haile Selassie of Ethiopia
- Princess Hirut Desta, 1930–2014, granddaughter of Emperor Haile Selassie of Ethiopia
- Princess Seble Desta, 1931–2023, granddaughter of Emperor Haile Selassie of Ethiopia
- Princess Sophia Desta, 1934–2021, granddaughter of Emperor Haile Selassie of Ethiopia
- Guli Francis-Dehqani, 1966-, Bishop of Chelmsford and member of the House of Lords
- Salome Mulugeta, Ethiopian film-maker
- Jember Teferra, 1943–2021, great-niece of Emperor Haile Selassie of Ethiopia
- Elizabeth Wilmshurst, 1948-, Distinguished Fellow, International Law, Chatham House

Reunions of "Old Clarendonians", the former staff and pupils of Clarendon School for Girls, are organised by Monkton Combe School. In 2018 the 120th anniversary of the founding of Clarendon House School at Malvern was celebrated with a reunion held at Monkton Combe School which was attended by sixty five former pupils and staff.
