= Salome Mulugeta =

American film director

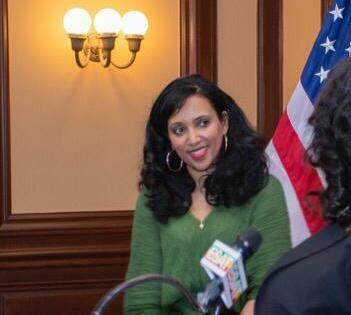
- Born: Addis Ababa, Ethiopia
- Education: MidAmerica Nazarene University
- Occupations: Actor and filmmaker

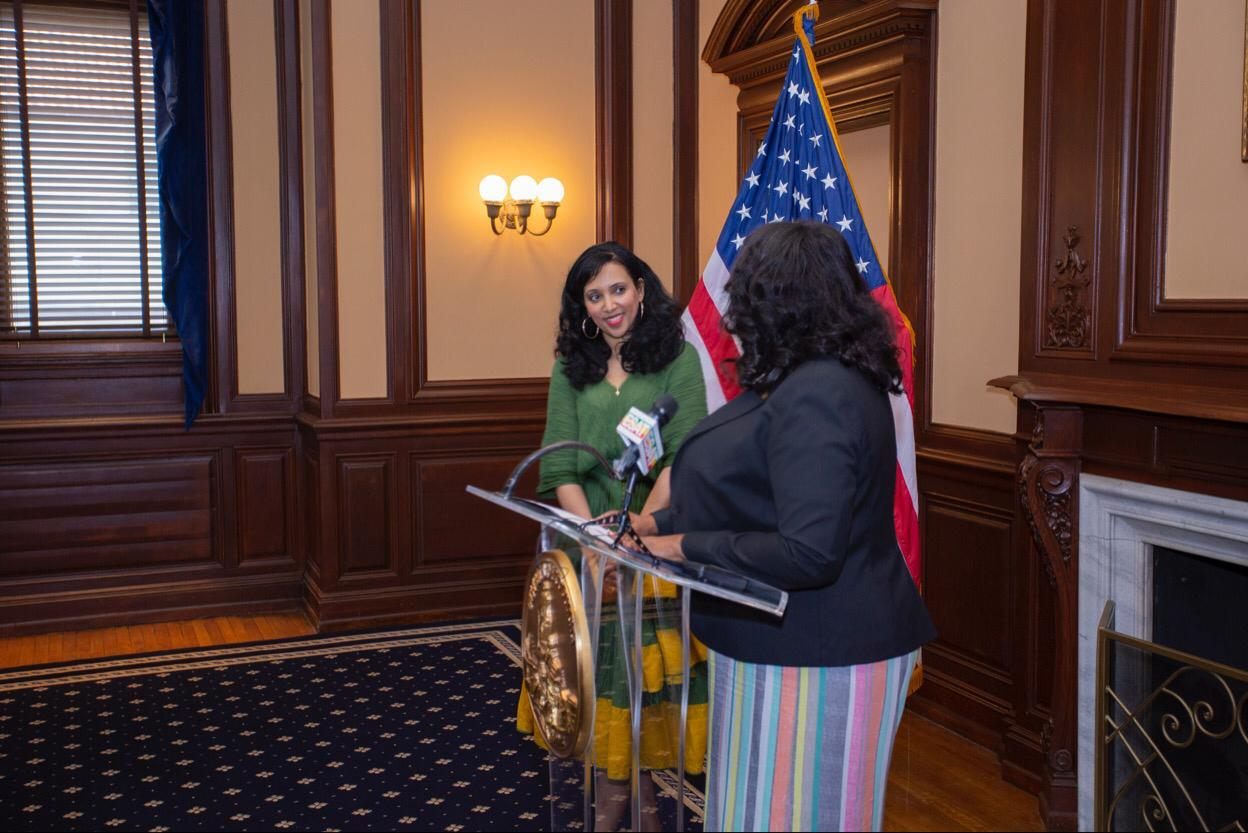
Salome Mulugeta at Mayor Muriel Bowser Proclamation

Salome Mulugeta is an Ethiopian and Eritrean-American filmmaker, actor and journalist educated in England. She is a 2024 Society of Ethiopians Established in Diaspora (SEED) awardee, the recipient of the Ambassador Award 2019 and a Mayor Muriel Bowser proclamation honoree. Salome is best known for her first feature film, Woven, co-written by Ryan Spahn, and for winning the Audience Narrative Award for Film Directed by Women of Color at the African Diaspora International Film Festival in New York. Mulugeta and Nagwa Ibrahim co-directed Woven which premiered at the Los Angeles Film Festival.

== Background ==
Salome Mulugeta was born in Addis Ababa, Ethiopia. She attended Clarendon School for Girls in Bedfordshire, England, before studying broadcasting and journalism at MidAmerica Nazarene University, a private Christian university in Olathe, Kansas. Salome worked at a local TV station in Kansas before moving to Los Angeles, where she co-wrote Woven with actor Ryan Spahn. After meeting Nagwa Ibrahim, the pair directed and produced Woven together. The film, in which Mulugeta also starred, debuted its New York premiere at the 2017 African Diaspora Film Festival in New York, and screened its world premiere at the 2016 Los Angeles Film Festival.

== Filmography ==
- Woven (2018)
- Abeka (In Development)
- A Lit Light Bulb (2018)
- Marz (2016)
- He's Way More Famous Than You (2013)
- Baby of the Family (2002)
