= Federal Negarit Gazeta =

Government gazette of Ethiopia

- "The Laws of Our Nation"
- Native name: የፌድራል ነጋሪት ጋዜጣ
- Type: Government gazette
- Owner: Ethiopian government
- Founded: 22 August 1995; 30 years ago
- Language: Amharic; English
- Headquarters: Addis Ababa, Ethiopia

The Federal Negarit Gazeta is the government gazette of Ethiopia, defined in Article 71.2 of the 1995 Constitution of Ethiopia and established on 22 August 1995 by the Federal Negarit Gazeta Establishment Proclamation No. 3/1995.

== Background ==
The Federal Negarit Gazeta was founded by the federal government of Ethiopia on 22 August 1995. It is constitutionally defined in Article 71.2 of the 1995 Constitution of Ethiopia and Proclamation No. 3/1995. Statute enacted by the legislature is published in the gazette, including legislative of federal and regional level executive and judicial organs as well as notice from judicial persons also published.
