= Mengesha Seyoum =

Prince of Ethiopian Empire

Le'ul Ras Mengesha Seyoum

Governor-General of Tigray
- In office 1960 – 12 October 1974
- Preceded by: Seyum Mangasha

Minister of Public Works and Communications
- In office 1958–1960

Governor of Sidamo
- In office 1955–1958
- Preceded by: Seyum Mangasha

Governor of Arsi
- In office 1952–1955
- Preceded by: Asrate Medhin Kassa

Personal details
- Born: 7 December 1927 (age 98) Addis Ababa, Ethiopian Empire
- Party: Ethiopian Democratic Union (1974-1978)
- Spouse(s): Princess Aida Desta (wid. 2013)
- Children: Woizero Ribka Mengesha; Lij Mikael Sehul Mengesha; Lij Yohannes Mengesha; Lij Stefanos Mengesha; Lij Jalyee Mengesha; Lij Seyoum Mengesha; Woizero Menen Mengesha

Le'ul Ras Mengesha Seyoum (Amharic: መንገሻ ሥዩም; born 7 December 1927) is a member of the imperial family of the Ethiopian Empire. In 1974, the monarchy was abolished by the Derg, a communist military junta.

== Early life and background ==
Le'ul Dejazmach Mangasha Seyum was born in 1927 in Addis Ababa and moved to Dengolat, a village in Enderta district, part of Tigray province of Ethiopia. He is the son of Ras Seyum Mangasha, the grandson of Ras Mangasha Yohannes, and the great grandson of Emperor Yohannes IV. Yohannes IV was the only Emperor of the Tigrayan cadet branch of the Solomonic dynasty (being descended in female lines from Emperors Yohannes I and Eyasu I). Emperor Menelik II of Shoa came to power after the Battle of Metemma when Yohannes IV was killed and the male line of the Solomonic Dynasty was re-established on the Imperial throne. Mangasha Seyum is the heir to the Tigrean royal line and a rival to the Shoan emperor. Ras Mangasha Seyum's grandfather, Mangasha Yohannes was raised as the nephew of Yohannes IV. However, Yohannes IV announced on his deathbed that Mangasha was his "natural" son and designated heir. It is still disputed among Tigrean royal descendants whether Mangasha Yohannes was indeed an actual son of Yohannes IV, or a nephew that Yohannes adopted on his deathbed in order to name him as his successor as his legitimate son Ras Araya Selassie Yohannes had died previously. There was a long-standing rivalry between the descendants of Ras Araya Selassie and Ras Mangasha Yohannes over the rule of Tigray and precedence. Her mother was Princess Adada (second wife of his father).

In January 1949, Mangasha Seyum married one of Haile Selassie I's granddaughters, Princess Aida Desta. They are the parents of five sons Lij Michael Sehul, Lij Yohannes, Lij Stephanos, Lij Jalye, Lij Seyoum and a daughter Immabet Menen. Mengesha Seyum was also the father of the late Immabet Rebka from his first marriage to Abonesh Demisse cousin of Princess Atsede Asfaw who was also Mengesha Seyum's stepmother.

== Administrator and minister (1948–60) ==
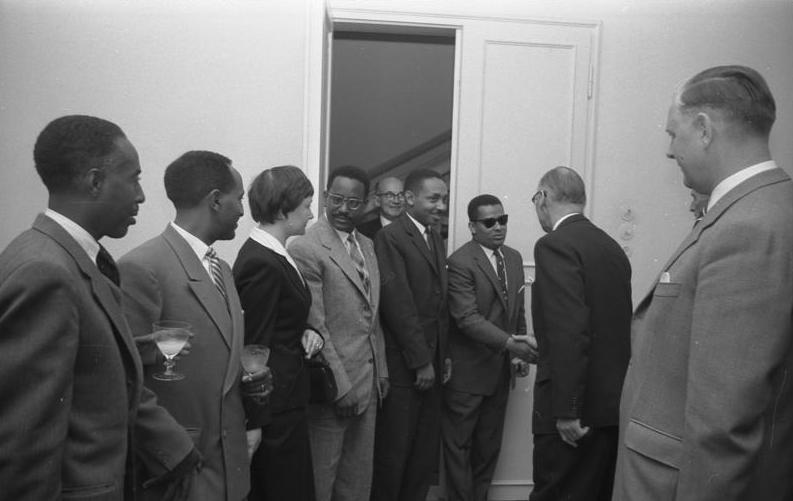
A photograph of Seyum Mangasha, second from left, taken on 18 April 1959 in Bonn, West Germany.

In 1948, at the age of 21, Mengesha, then known by the title of Leul Dejazmach, was appointed to his first government post as district governor of Ambo awrajja (then known as Hager Selam). As district governor Le'ul Dejazmach Mengesha developed the town's electricity supply, built the first secondary school, health clinics, bridges and roads, as well developing recreational and tourist infrastructure by building a road to Lake Wonchi, and modernizing the natural hot spring water baths in Ambo town.

In 1952 he was appointed Governor-General of Arsi Province, serving until 1955. As governor he initiated the provision of potable water to the provincial capital of Asella, also modernized that city's hot water spring baths to increase tourism, and promoted the wool industry by organizing the distribution of the Merino breed of sheep and introducing modern wool weaving equipment. As Governor of Sidamo from 1955 to 1957, he promoted the coffee industry by establishing education and training programs for local farmers and enabling coffee merchants from Addis Ababa to set up processing plants in the province.

In 1957 he was appointed Minister of Public Works in the cabinet of Prime Minister Ras Abebe Aregai. His tenure was marked in particular by progress in the aviation sector; he oversaw the construction of Bole International Airport, which replaced Lideta Airport as Addis Ababa's main international gateway. As Chairman of Ethiopian Airlines, he negotiated civil air transport agreements on behalf of Ethiopian Airlines with the governments of West Germany, Liberia, Ghana, Mali, Nigeria and Guinea, and opened Africa's first jet maintenance facility as well as the first civilian Pilot Training School and Hostess Training Institute for flight attendants. He also played a major role in the establishment of the Ethiopian Tourism Organization, renegotiated the contract for the Franco-Ethiopian railway, and built an oil refinery in Asseb. During his tenure a bridge was built over the Blue Nile near Bahir Dar connecting the provinces of Begemder and Gojjam.

== Governor of Tigray (1960–74) ==
After his father was murdered during the unsuccessful 1960 coup against Emperor Haile Selassie Mengesha Seyoum was elevated to the title of Leul Ras and became Prince and Governor of Tigray. He governed from his capital in Mek'ele and held this position until 1974 when the monarchy was abolished.

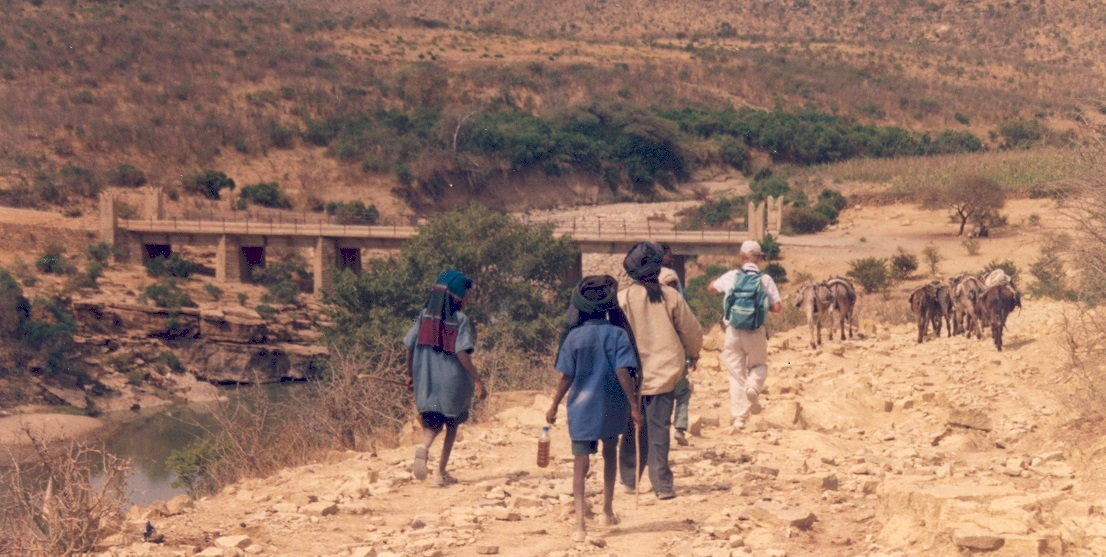
Bridge over Giba river, built by order of Mengesha Seyoum in the 1960s

He kept strong connections with Tembien from where his family originated: he participated yearly in the annual patron's day at Abune Aregawi church in Zeyi which his grandfather Yohannes IV had built. He also ordered to build a road and a bridge linking Dogu'a Tembien and Inderta. At the time of his reign he was much criticised for his authoritarianism. While nowadays public opinion remembers him by his road building activities or start of the first modern soil conservation, the rural people are well aware of the plight of their ancestors during feudality.

== Opposition, exile, and later life ==
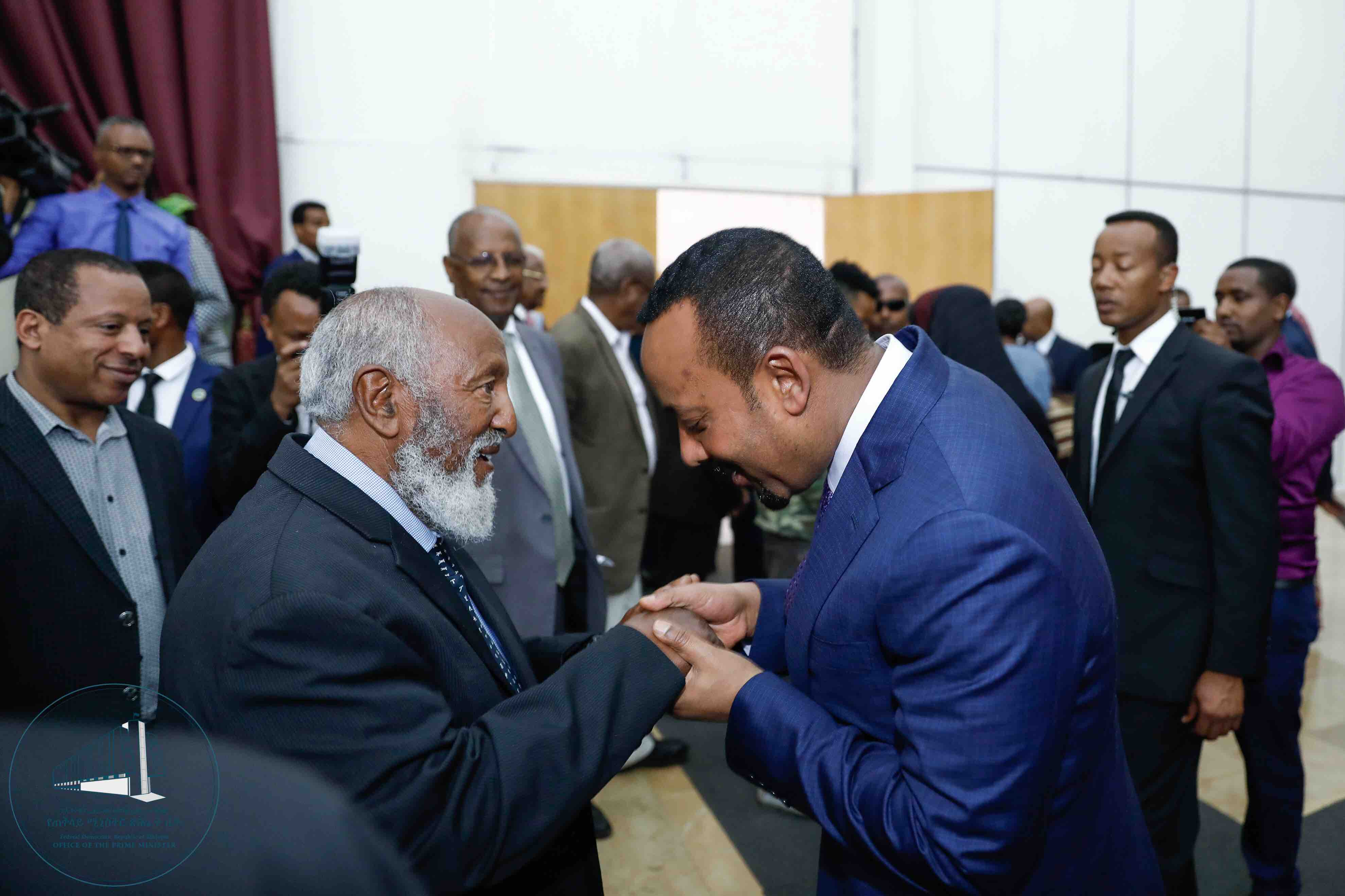
Leul Ras Mengesha and Prime Minister Abiy Ahmed in February 2019.

In October 1974, after the monarchy was toppled, representatives of the Derg ordered Seyum Mangasha to the capital to face charges of corruption, but instead he fled to the hills. There Mengesha Seyoum helped to found a group that eventually became the Ethiopian Democratic Union (EDU). His wife, Princess Aida Desta, and his daughter were arrested by the Derg in 1974. Although his daughter would eventually escape abroad, his wife remained in prison for 14 years. The EDU was a conservative and pro-monarchy and is the oldest of the Ethiopian political parties. The EDU later merged with the Ethiopian Democratic Party and formed the Ethiopian Democratic Unity Party (EDUP), which later was one of the parties that joined to form the United Ethiopian Democratic Forces, one of the two largest opposition parties in Ethiopia. In 2000, the EDU reorganized in Addis Ababa as a legal opposition party after the Tigrayan People's Liberation Front led the Ethiopian People's Revolutionary Democratic Front to power. Leul Ras Mengesha has retreated from all involvement in the political affairs of this party and its successor organizations.

Leul Ras Mengesha Seyoum lives mostly in Addis Ababa, and partly in the Washington Since his wife of more than 60 years, Princess Aida died on January 15, 2013, in Alexandria, Virginia. He maintains a close relationship with his children, eleven grandchildren and five great-grandchildren.

He is regarded as the senior surviving nobleman of the Ethiopian Empire, and the senior Prince of a cadet branch of the Imperial dynasty. Although for a significant period during the 1970s and 1980s he was regarded as a possible candidate for the succession by many monarchists, in 1989 he accepted and recognized the proclamation of Crown Prince Asfaw Wossen as Emperor in Exile of Ethiopia under the name Amha Selassie. Leul Ras Mengesha was prominent at the funerals of Emperor in Exile Amha Selassie, the reburial of Emperor Haile Selassie, Princess Tenagnework (who was his mother-in-law) and Empress Medferiashwork.

With the death of Emperor Amha Selassie, Leul Ras Mengesha is considered the elder member of the extended Imperial family, and at public events where members of the Imperial family appear, such as royal funerals, is given precedence over all male members of the family except Crown Prince Zera Yacob Amha Selassie.

In February 2019 he was appointed to the National Reconciliation Commission.

== Honours ==
=== National honours ===
- - Knight Grand Cordon of the Order of the Holy Trinity.

=== Foreign honours ===
- - Honorary Knight Grand Cross of the Royal Victorian Order (United Kingdom, 01/02/1965).

== See also ==
- Monarchies of Ethiopia
- Line of succession to the Ethiopian Throne
- Ethiopian aristocratic and court titles
- List of honorary British Knights
- Aida Desta - Wife
- Stefanos Mengesha Seyoum - Son
- Wolete Israel Seyum - Sister
- Berhanu G Negash - Twice Removed

== Sources ==
- Mockler, Anthony (2002). Haile Sellassie's War. New York: Olive Branch Press. ISBN 978-1-56656-473-1.
