= Nigist Mengesha =

Ethiopian-Israeli activist and social worker

- ניגיסט מנגשה
- Born: North Gondar Zone, Ethiopia
- Citizenship: Ethiopia; Israel
- Education: Bar Ilan University (BA); Hebrew University of Jerusalem (MA); University of Sussex (PhD)
- Occupations: Social worker, community activist
- Children: 4

Nigist Mengesha (Hebrew: ניגיסט מנגשה, Amharic: ኒጂስት ሜንጌሻ) is an Ethiopian-Israeli community activist and social worker known for her efforts on behalf of Ethiopian Jews in Israel.

== Life ==
Nigist Mengesha was born in a small village near Gondar in Ethiopia, where she worked as a social worker at the Prison Authority. She immigrated to Israel in 1984, as part of Operation Moses. She needed to leave her husband and four children, but was re-united with them two months later. She then gained a B.A. in social work from Bar Ilan University and an M.A. in social work from the Hebrew University of Jerusalem.

In Israel Mengesha saw her own children struggle to adjust to an inflexible school system, prompting her to work for greater cultural awareness in the Israeli educational system. In 1996 she co-founded the FIDEL Association, training fellow Ethiopian Israelis to be social and educational mediators in 140 schools throughout Israel. She helped found the Ethiopian National Project (ENP), a partnership between the Israeli government, the Jewish diaspora and the Ethiopian Israeli community which was inaugurated in November 2002 and started active work in January 2005. Initial funding was raised from the United Jewish Communities in the United States. The Israeli government pledged to match money raised abroad, though there were delays in receiving the promised funding. As ENP director-general, Mengashe joined other community leaders in calling for the Knesset to pay more attention to the situation of Ethiopian Jews, while emphasising the need for the community to build their own resources:

Today's children have lost hope and see no promise in the future. We have to rebuild that hope and show them that they can succeed. If they have no strong feelings for the future then nothing else really matters.

In 2009, she reiterated concern at the continued difficulty of assimilation: "after 25 years, it's time we should be [an] integral part of the state of Israel."

In 2007, Mengesha gained a Ph.D. from the University of Sussex. In 2010, she received the Samuel Rothberg Prize for Jewish Education from Hebrew University.

Mangesha resigned as director of the Ethiopian National Project in 2011. She is currently director of the department of education at the Rosh Ha’ayin Municipality.
