= Stefanos Mengesha Seyoum =

Stefanos Mengesha Seyoum Selassie
- Prince of Ethiopia
- Born: 24 October 1952 (age 73); Addis Ababa, Ethiopian Empire
- Issue: Lij Araya Estifanos Mengesha; Kaleb (adopted son); Meron (adopted daughter)
Names
- Lij Estifanos Mengesha
- House: House of Solomon
- Father: Ras Mengesha Seyoum
- Mother: Princess Aida Desta
- Religion: Ethiopian Orthodox Tewahedo

Prince Stefanos Mengesha Seyoum (also Estifanos Mangasha Seyum, born 24 October 1952), is a member of the Imperial Family of Ethiopia. He serves as the Imperial Chancellor of the Imperial Ethiopian Order of Saint Mary of Zion. He is the son of Ras Mengesha Seyoum and Princess Aida Desta. Through his father he is a great-great grandson of Emperor Yohannes IV, and through his mother, he is a great-grandson of Emperor Haile Selassie. He was awarded the Grand Cross of the Royal Confraternity of San Teotonio.

He was educated at the University of Toronto, Canada. He is an International Business Consultant and Director of the Canadian Royal Heritage Trust. His son is actor Araya Mengesha.

== Honours ==
- Deputy Grand Master of the Ethiopian Order of Baronets (Grazmatch).
- Chancellor of the Imperial Ethiopian Order of Saint Mary of Zion.
- Chancellor of the Imperial Solomonic Order of Merit.
- Patron of the Sovereign Military Order of the Temple of Jerusalem (Priory of the Mountain of the House of the Lord).
- Knight Grand Cross of the Royal Confraternity of Sao Teotonio.
- Knight Grand Cross of the Royal Order of the Intare.
- Knight Grand Cross of the Order of the Eagle of Georgia.

== See also ==
- Line of succession to the former Ethiopian throne
- Seyum Mangasha
