= Order of Menelik II =

Imperial house order of Ethiopian Empire

- Grand Cross insignia of the Order of Menelik II
- Type: House order
- Country: Ethiopian Empire
- Royal house: House of Solomon
- Religious affiliation: Ethiopian Orthodox
- Sovereign: Emperor of Ethiopia
- Grades: Knight Grand Cross; Knight Commander; Commander; Officer; Member

Precedence
- Next (higher): Order of the Holy Trinity
- Next (lower): Order of the Star of Ethiopia

The Imperial Order of Emperor Menelik II is an Ethiopian order established in 1924 by then-Regent Tafari Makonnen, during the reign of Empress Zewditu I, in order to honor the memory of Emperor Menelik II. The Imperial Order was often referred to as the Order of the Ethiopian Lion, for the lion depicted in the center of the red and green cross. The honor was designed by the Parisian firm Arthus-Betrand, and is presented in five grades: Knight Grand Cross, Knight Commander, Commander, Officer and Member.

Ribbon bars of the order
Knight Grand Cross	Knight Commander	Commander	Officer	Member

== See also ==
- List of military decorations
