= Order of Solomon =

Ethiopian order of knighthood

Imperial Order of Solomon
- Type: Order presented to heads of state
- Country: Ethiopian Empire
- Royal house: House of Solomon
- Religious affiliation: Ethiopian Orthodox
- Sovereign: Emperor of Ethiopia
- Grades: Knight (Grand Collar)

Precedence
- Next (lower): Imperial Order of the Seal of Solomon
- Ribbon of the order

The Imperial Order of Solomon was an order of knighthood of the Ethiopian Empire founded in 1874. A special class Collar was created by Empress Zewditu in 1922. It was a split off from the Order of the Seal of Solomon and created as an independent order with a single grade of "Collar" by Emperor Haile Selassie I in 1930. Members are identified as a "Knight" of the Order of Solomon, with the use the post-nominal initials KS.

The Collar of the Order of Solomon is reserved for the Emperor and Empress, members of the Imperial Family, Foreign Sovereigns, and a maximum of three ordinary recipients who have rendered exceptionally meritorious services. Recipients were entitled to wear special ceremonial robes on "collar days".

The Solomonic dynasty, the ancient Imperial House of Ethiopia, claims descent from King Solomon and the Queen of Sheba, said to have given birth to King Menelik I after her visit to Solomon in Jerusalem.

As the Empire's principal Order, it featured first in the long list of knightly titles of the last ruling Emperor of Ethiopia, Haile Selassie, described as –

The Lion of Judah Hath Prevailed (or "[by the] Conquering Lion of the Tribe of Judah"); His Imperial Majesty Haile Selassie I, King of Kings of Ethiopia, Conquering Lion of Judah, Elect of God, Grand Cordon of the Order of Solomon, Knight Grand Cross of the Order of Solomon, Knight of the Garter, Knight Grand Cross of the Order of the Bath, Knight Grand Cross of the Order of St Michael and St George...

== Insignia ==
When the Emperor Yohannes IV awarded the Order to Admiral Sir William Hewett, c. 1884, it was described as "a gold triangular medal with six precious stones".
