= Ethiopian National Dialogue Commission =

Ethiopian independent government organization

- የኢትዮጵያ ብሔራዊ ምክክር ኮሚሽን

Agency overview
- Formed: 29 December 2021
- Jurisdiction: Ethiopia
- Headquarters: Sidst Kilo, Addis Ababa, Ethiopia
- Agency executive: Mesfin Araya, Chairman
- Website: ethiondc.org.et/en

The Ethiopian National Dialogue Commission (Amharic: የኢትዮጵያ ሀገራዊ ምክክር ኮሚሽን; ENDC) is an independent government body that established in 2021 to foster national consensus, sustainable peace, and reconciliation in the country through an inclusive dialogue.

It was established in aftermath of the Tigray war, to overcome challenges in conflict resolution between the federal government and the Tigray regional government.

== Overview ==
The Ethiopian National Dialogue Commission (ENDC) was established on 29 December 2021 under Proclamation No. 1265/2021 to foster national consensus, sustainable peace, and reconciliation in the country through an inclusive dialogue. The establishment coincided with the worsened situation in Tigray Region where the federal government and the Tigray regional force engaged in war. On 11 February 2022, the House of Peoples' Representatives approved 11 commissioners, more than 600 people were nominated by the public sectors for appointment. 42 individuals were shortlisted through screening procedure and consultation.

The Commission has garnered criticism through its foundation where many stakeholders and the public objected the nomination and selection process of the commissioners. This includes political intervention and lean toward the ruling Prosperity Party.

== Extension of mandate ==
Ethiopia's parliament on the 18th of February 2026 unanimously decided to prolong the nation's peace and dialogue process by eight months, demonstrating their continued support for attempts to resolve domestic problems through communication.The decision was approved at the House's first emergency session in its fifth year of operation, during which the members of the house discussed the Commission's performance report.

During the report presentation, the commissioner stated that the commission was able to reach several regions but faced security and operational challenges in Tigray, which hindered comprehensive consultations there. The committee for Democratic Affairs proposed the extension of the commission’s mandate to allow completion of the outstanding dialogues and ensure the adoption of the conclusions are adopted with full house endorsement of the proposal.

== See also ==
- Ethiopian Reconciliation Commission, created in 2018
