= Order of the Seal of Solomon =

Ethiopian order of knighthood

- Breast star of the Grand Cordon grade.
- Type: House Order
- Country: Ethiopian Empire
- Royal house: House of Solomon
- Religious affiliation: Ethiopian Orthodox
- Sovereign: Emperor of Ethiopia
- Grand Master: President of the Crown Council of Ethiopia
- Grades: Grand Cordon; Grand Officer; Commander; Officer; Chevalier (Knight)
- Former grades: Collar

Precedence
- Next (higher): Imperial Order of Solomon
- Next (lower): Imperial Order of the Queen of Sheba
- Ribbon of the order

The Order of the Seal of Solomon is an order of knighthood of the Ethiopian Empire, founded by Emperor Yohannes IV in 1874 as the highest imperial honour, containing five grades. In 1930, an even higher Order was established, i.e. the Order of Solomon, which was a split off from the Order of the Seal of Solomon. The Order was conferred on members of imperial house and upon persons who had rendered meritorious services.

After the deposition of Haile Selassie and dissolution of the Ethiopian Empire, the order continued as a house order to be awarded by the House of Solomon. Today, its current Grand Master is the President of the Crown Council, Prince Ermias Sahle Selassie, the grandson of Emperor Haile Selassie of Ethiopia.

The Solomonic dynasty, the ancient Imperial House of Ethiopia, claims descent from King Solomon and the Queen of Sheba, said to have given birth to King Menelik I after her visit to Solomon in Jerusalem.

== Grades ==
The Order has five grades. The superior class "Collar" was introduced in the Order by Empress Zauditu in 1922, but with the amendment in 1930, this grade was separated as independent order by Emperor Haile Selassie (i.e., as the Order of Solomon, with a single class of "Collar").

- Superior class:
  - Collar (separated as independent order in 1930; limited to members of the imperial family and 5 ordinary recipients);
- Five ordinary classes:
  - Grand Cordon (limited to 15 recipients);
  - Grand Officer (limited to 25 recipients);
  - Commander (limited to 35 recipients);
  - Officer (limited to 45 recipients);
  - Chevalier (limited to 55 recipients).

== Description ==
The badge of the order is a gold Star of David with a cross bottony in the center enameled green with a central gold Latin cross. The badge was suspended by the Ethiopian crown in gold. The plaque bears the badge of the order on a gold star with rays. The ribbon is solid green. Lower grades of the order had the central cross botton enameled.
