= Order of the Queen of Sheba =

Order of Ethiopian Empire

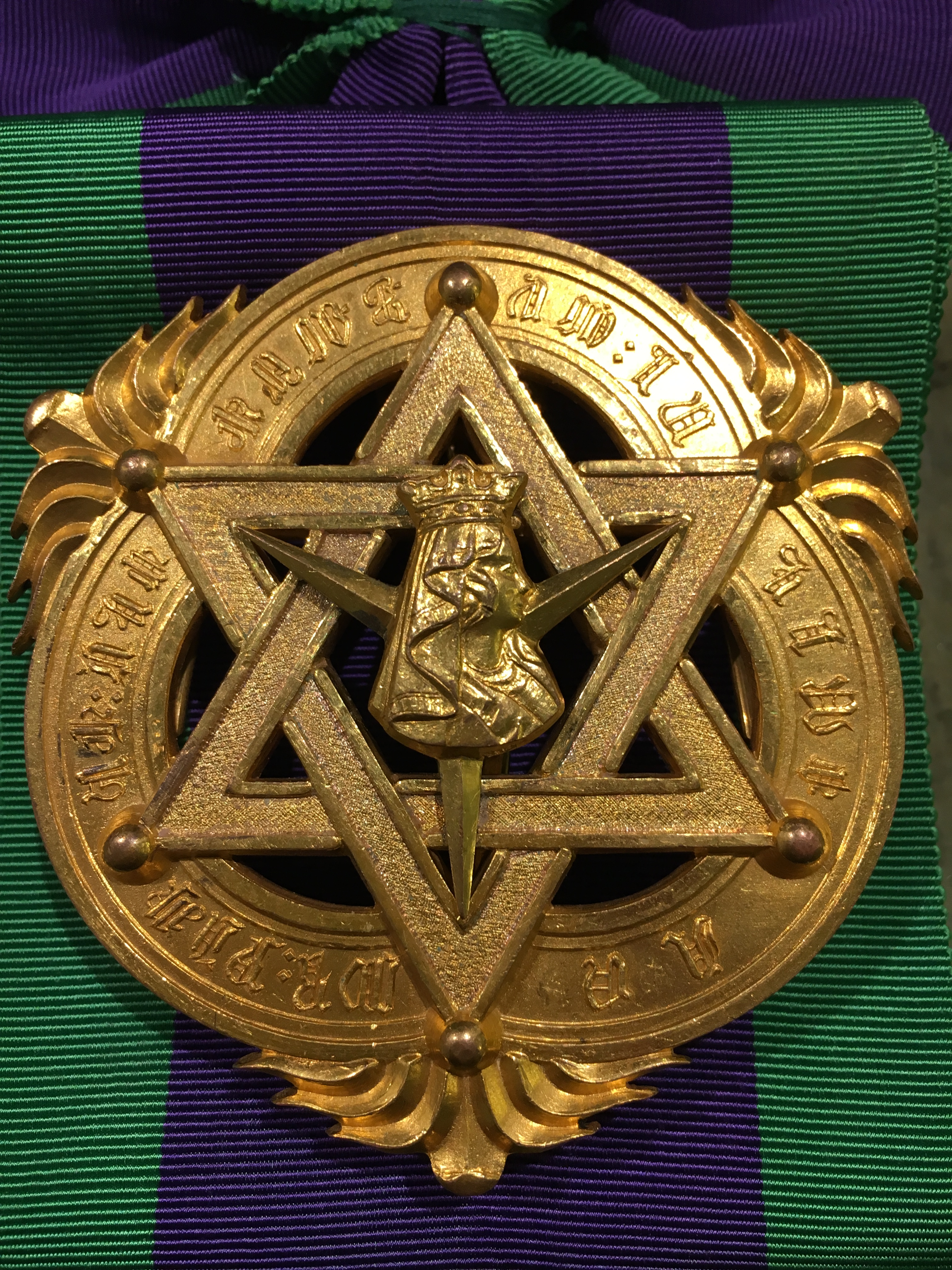
- Grand Cross breast star of the Order of the Queen of Sheba
- Type: Order of Merit
- Country: Ethiopian Empire
- Royal house: House of Solomon
- Religious affiliation: Ethiopian Orthodox
- Sovereign: Emperor of Ethiopia
- Grades: Collar; Grand Cordon; Grand Officer; Commander; Officer; Member or Knight

Precedence
- Next (higher): Imperial Order of the Seal of Solomon
- Next (lower): Order of the Holy Trinity
- Ribbon of the order

The Order of the Queen of Sheba was originally instituted as a ladies' order in 1922 in the Ethiopian Empire by Empress Zewditu and would later become the diplomatic symbol of a holy pact.

== Classes ==
The Order of the Queen of Sheba is presented in the following classes:

- Collar (only in favor of members of the royal family)
- Grand Cordon (limited to 25)
- Grand Officer (limited to 45)
- Commander (limited to 55)
- Officer (unlimited)
- Member or Chevalier (i.e. "Knight"; also unlimited)
