= Yeshimebet Ali =

Mother of Emperor Haile Selassie

Woizero Yeshimebet Ali
- Spouse: Ras Makonnen Wolde Mikael
- Issue: Dejazmatch Yilma Makonnen; Emperor Haile Selassie
- Father: Dejazmatch Ali Abba Jiffar

Woizero Yeshimebet Ali was the wife of Ras Makonnen and mother of Emperor Haile Selassie of Ethiopia. She was the daughter of Dejazmatch Ali Abba Jiffar [Gonshur], who was from Oromo and a former trader from Gondar. Yeshimebet died during her son's infancy. Her mother and her sister Woizero Mammit helped care for her young son as he grew to adulthood. She had eight miscarriages before giving birth to Haile Selassie.
