= Makonnen Wolde Mikael =

Ethiopian prince of Shewa (1852–1906)

Ras Makonnen Wolde Mikael መኮንን ወልደ ሚካኤል KCMG
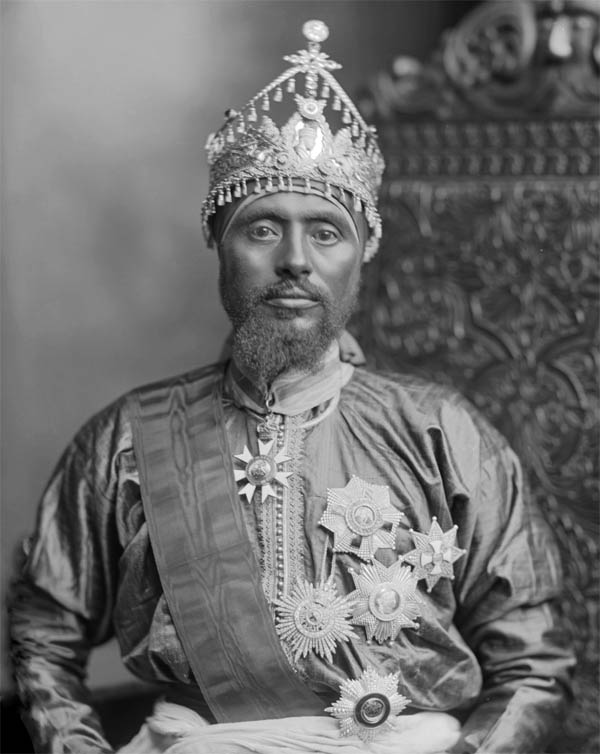
- Makonnen in 1902

Governor of Harar
- In office 1887–1906
- Monarch: Menelik II
- Succeeded by: Yilma Makonnen

Personal details
- Born: 8 May 1852 Menz, Shewa Province, Ethiopian Empire
- Died: 21 March 1906 (aged 53) Kulubi, Hararghe, Ethiopian Empire
- Spouse: Yeshimebet Ali
- Children: Yilma Makonnen; Tafari Makonnen
- Occupation: Military officer, diplomat, court official

Military service
- Allegiance: Ethiopian Empire
- Battles/wars: Menelik's Expansions: Battle of Chelenqo; First Italo-Ethiopian War: Battle of Amba Alagi; Battle of Mekelle; Battle of Adwa

Ras Makonnen Wolde Mikael Wolde Melekot (8 May 1852 – 21 March 1906), known simply as Ras Makonnen, was an Ethiopian military commander, provincial governor and diplomat, and the father of the future Emperor Haile Selassie. Through his mother, a daughter of Negus Sahle Selassie of Shewa, he was a first cousin of Emperor Menelik II, at whose court he was raised from the age of fourteen. He rose through a series of campaigns in the 1870s and 1880s to become, in January 1887, governor of Harar, a post he held until his death, and the Russian poet and traveller Nikolai Gumilev later called him one of the greatest leaders of Abyssinia.

As governor, Makonnen built a hospital and schools in Harar, encouraged the extension of the railway, imported the region's first printing press, and helped the French develop the port of Djibouti, while also extending imperial authority east and south into the Ogaden. The historian Tim Carmichael describes him as fair and just toward his subjects, with the exception of the Somali, and credits him with promoting relations between Harar's Christian and Muslim communities. Other accounts describe his rule as marked by heavy exactions from the city's Harari population and, in some sources, the destruction of its main mosque; the French traveller Jules Borelli's contemporary account of looting by Menelik's soldiers was later disputed by the historian Richard Caulk, who described the occupation of Harar as conducted in an "exemplary" manner. In 1895 and 1896 he commanded Ethiopian forces against the invading Italians, taking part in the sieges of Amba Alagi and Mekelle before fighting at Adwa, where he was wounded twice and, by tradition, saved by his son Yilma, whom he afterward legitimised.

Makonnen's contact with the European residents of Harar made him Ethiopia's leading envoy of the period. He travelled twice to Rome over the Treaty of Wuchale and its aftermath, in 1897 helped fix Ethiopia's boundary with British Somaliland, and in 1898 helped suppress a rebellion in Tigray, of which he was briefly made governor alongside Harar. Later tradition holds that Menelik rewarded him by naming him heir to the throne, though the historian Richard Caulk has questioned whether Menelik seriously intended this. From 1899 Makonnen also coordinated operations with the British against the Somali leader Sayyid Mohammed Abdullah Hassan, and in 1902 he led Ethiopia's delegation to the coronation of Edward VII in London, receiving the KCMG and honours from Russia, France, Italy and the Ottoman Empire.

In the 1890s Makonnen built the church of Kulubi Gabriel after vowing to do so if peace could be restored to the Charchar region, and he died there in 1906 of typhus contracted while travelling to Addis Ababa at Menelik's summons; the shrine he founded later became one of Ethiopia's largest pilgrimage sites. His equestrian monument in Harar, erected in 1959, was destroyed by rioters in June 2020 amid unrest that followed the killing of the singer Hachalu Hundessa.

== Biography ==
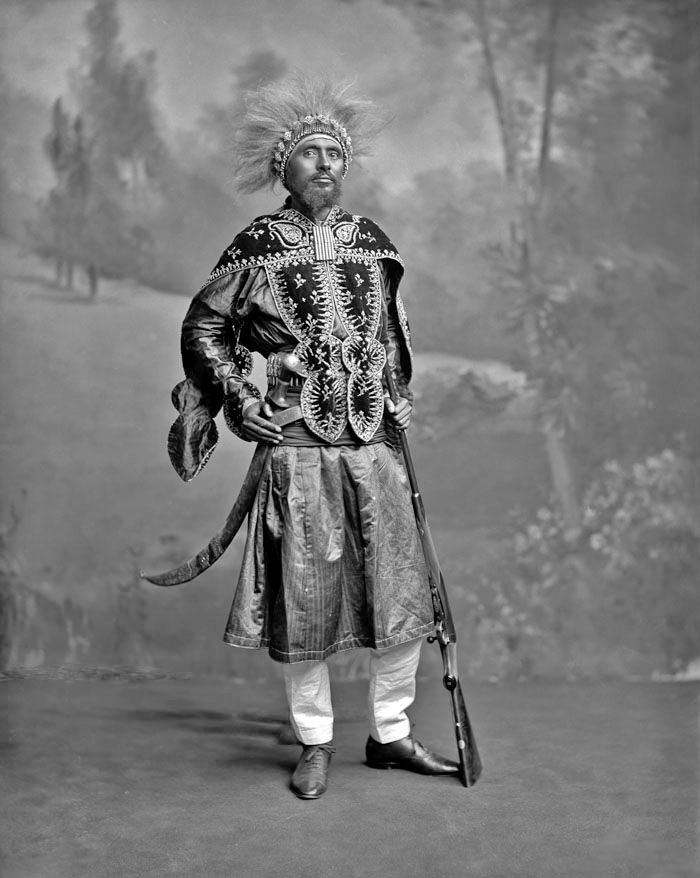
Ras Makonnen, August 1902

Ras Makonnen Wolde Mikael Wolde Melekot was born in Derefo Maryam near Ankober, in what was then in the province of Menz to his mother Woizero Tenagnework Sahle Selassie and his father Dejazmach Wolde Mikael Wolde Melekot was an Amharan noble, who was the hereditary ruler of the province of Menz, a thoroughly Amharan area often referred to us "the source of the Amhara". His maternal lineage is also ethnically Amhara with a Solomonic genealogy, his mother being a daughter of Sahle Selassie of Shewa.

In 1865, at the age of 14 his father took him to the court of Negus Menelik, then ruler of Shewa, where he engaged in military training and imbibed the skills of statecraft. During these years he took a common-law wife, who bore him a son, Yilma. In 1876 he left her to marry Yeshimebet Ali, then eleven years old, the daughter of Woizero Wolete Giyorgis and Dejazmach Ali Abba Gifar of Wollo; she bore him Tafari, the future Haile Selassie, in 1892 and died on 14 March 1894. Makonnen did not marry again in the ordinary sense, though in 1901, at the urging of Empress Taytu Betul, who hoped through the match to gain some influence over him, he entered a brief union with her niece, Woizero Mentewab Wale. The marriage was never consummated and was annulled in 1902.

In 1876, Makonnen was awarded the rank of Balambaras and by 1881 commanded 1,000 well armed troops. In the same year he served in a campaign against the Arsi Oromo who were disrupting trade caravans from Tadjoura. He served in the Battle of Embabo, and fought against the Arsi for a second time. Makonnen lead the troops that captured the Amir's field cannons during the Battle of Chelenqo.

=== Governorship ===
In 1887, Makonnen was given the governorship of Harar after it was incorporated into the Ethiopian Empire by his cousin, Emperor Menelik following the Battle of Chelenqo. According to Jules Borelli, Harar was pillaged by Abyssinian soldiers with half its population fleeing, despite pleas from the despoiled locals to Makonnen. Borelli's account was later disputed by the historian Richard Caulk, an American scholar of Harari history, who described Makonnen's occupation of the city as conducted in an "exemplary" manner and argued that Harar was spared the pillage usually associated with Ethiopian warfare of the period. By contrast, the historian Tim Carmichael describes Makonnen as fair and just toward his subjects apart from the Somali, crediting him with promoting relations between Harar's Christian and Muslim communities. According to a Harari community leader interviewed by the historian Namhla Matshanda, the oppression of the Harari people began with the invasion of Harar by Ras Makonnen, followed by mosques being converted into churches and Abyssinian Christians arriving from the north to settle in the town. Makonnen had ordered the primary mosque of Harar to be replaced by an Orthodox Church, according to the historian Raymond Jonas. The French traveler Charles Michel notes that "the first years of the Abyssinian occupation were far from prosperous" as the Abyssinians "took for themselves what could have any value", while "the soldiers, several thousand in number, chased the Hararis from their dwellings to install themselves in their place, and devastated everything around them." Trade and traders were driven away from the city and markets were held instead in the remote countryside. As the occupation progressed, Makonnen set about undermining Harari wealth by expropriating their land and offering it to his soldiers.

At Harar, Makonnen enjoyed good relations with expatriates, including Capuchin missionaries and a growing number of Europeans enroute to the capital. From there he learned as much as possible about the outside world. He especially appreciated Russians due to their shared Orthodox faith, and unlike other western Europeans, did not have colonial pretensions. Makonnen also had a passion for firearms and was heavily involved in the local arms trade, he imported weapons, some of whom he shipped to Shewa, others he used to subdue or extract tribute from the nearby Somalis. Makonnen pushed the expansion of the empire to the east and south of Harar, conquering the territories of the Issa and the Gadabuursi. In 1890, more reinforcements from Addis Ababa allowed Makonnen to occupy all of the Ogaden by 1891. In 1896 Ras Makonnen appointed Abdullah Tahir, governor of Jigjiga.

Conditions in the city rapidly improved once the soldiers left for service in the Ogaden. The Harari nobility was allowed some participation in the city's government, as running of the city was entrusted to the Amir's nephew, Ali. However ravaging and additional atrocities against the populace by the Abyssinians did not cease, the Harari people soon revolted and Makonnen marched into town with his troops, cowed the population, and imprisoned Ali. Once in the town, the troops went wild, demolished and looted homes, tyrannized the population, and killed several people. According to historian Norman Bennett, Makonnen may have aroused an insurrection to obtain absolute power in Harar. He successively replaced Ali with two other Harari viceroys, Yusuf Berkhedle and Haji Abdullahi Sadiq.

=== Diplomat ===
Due to his familiarly with the Europeans, he was soon made to lead Ethiopian missions abroad. His first trip took place in 1889 to witness Rome's formal ratification of the Treaty of Wuchale which provided a welcome opportunity to buy modern weapons and ammunition. On his way home in 1890, he stopped in Jerusalem, where he purchased land on behalf of the Ethiopian government, and the Greek patriarch presented him with a gold crucifix in which a sliver of the True Cross was embedded. In April of that year, after arriving in Addis Ababa, he was promoted to the rank of Ras.

Back at home, Makonnen took part in debates about Article 17 of the Treaty of Wuchale, condemning Italy's position. In 1892, Ras Makonnen was summoned to Shewa because of Italian intrigue in Tigray, an insurrection in Gojjam, and an attempted palace coup. Makonnen spent much of the next 2 years participating in internal and external debates about Article 17. In the meantime his well equipped troops in Harar underwent raiding expeditions throughout the Somali lowlands to capture sheep and cattle to restock highland herds decimated by the rinderpest epidemic.

==== Italo-Ethiopian War ====
In early 1895, tensions with Italy dramatically increased into the outbreak of the First Italo-Ethiopian War. Despite the security problems in Hararghe, Ras Makonnen and his well equipped troops eagerly took part in the war against the Italians. Ras Makonnen's Harar army spearheaded Menelik's forces in their northern march to confront the occupying Italians in Tigray province. The first clash occurred on 7 December 1895 during Battle of Amba Alagi when Pietro Toselli came under attack by the troops of Ras Makonnen, had occupied the road leading back to Eritrea, and launched a surprise attack on the flanks of Toselli's men, completely devastating the Italian force.

Ras Makonnen followed up this victory by reaching the Italian fort at Mekelle, surrounding it with his men and launching a series of abortive attacks on the Italian fort. Makonnen had hinted grimly that he might not come out alive during this attack, which resulted in Menelik II to order Ras Alula to prevent him from getting killed and keep watch on his cousin. As a result, Alula and Ras Mengesha Yohannes had Makonnen under arrest at Taytu Betul's orders until the rest of Menelik's army could join the battle. Once Menelik arrived at Mekelle, he called off the attack and had established contact with the Italian commander, giving him the opportunity to leave peacefully in exchange for surrender. On January 21, with permission from the Italian high command, the Italian commander agreed to surrender, allowing them to peacefully leave Mekelle with their weapons. Ras Mekonnen was sent to "escort" them back to Italian lines – a convenient way to bring a major part of the Ethiopian army to scout deep into Italian-held territory.

Ras Makonnen's troops played an important role at the Battle of Adwa, his men spent much of the battle mauling Matteo Albertone's Brigade on the slopes of Enda Keret, then occupying Mount Gusoso between Albertone's and Dabormida's position. His forces then turn on Dabormida Brigade, allowing the Oromo cavalry to decimate it while attempting to withdraw. Makonnen himself was wounded twice in the fighting. His life was reportedly saved by Yilma, the son born to him before his marriage to Yeshimebet Ali, whom he formally legitimised afterward. The historian Richard Caulk has cautioned that later accounts overstated Makonnen's personal role at Adwa, noting that he served in the advance guard and as a negotiator rather than as the campaign's central figure.

After Adwa, Makonnen led a campaign to the gold-mining districts around Asosa, west of the Blue Nile, reaching as far as Fazogli on the Sudanese border before returning to Addis Ababa in May 1898. He had already helped negotiate, in 1897, the Anglo-Ethiopian treaty fixing the boundary with British Somaliland. That October he was made governor of Tigray in addition to Harar and, with Ras Mikael of Wollo, captured Tigray's rebellious governor, Ras Mengesha Yohannes, delivering him to Menelik in early 1899. Some accounts hold that Menelik rewarded Makonnen's service by declaring him heir to the throne; Caulk considers this unlikely and unsupported by Haile Selassie's own memoirs, though he notes the rumour circulated among contemporary Europeans. From about 1899 Makonnen coordinated joint operations with the British against the Somali leader Sayyid Mohammed Abdullah Hassan, continuing until a truce in 1905, and in these years he also built a hospital and schools in Harar, encouraged the coming of the railway, helped the French develop the port of Djibouti, and imported the region's first printing press.

=== Travel abroad ===
In 1902, Ras Makonnen attended the coronation of King Edward VII in London. He arrived in June to the ceremony originally scheduled for 26 June, and stayed in Europe while the King recovered from an operation, attending the rescheduled ceremony on 9 August. Between these dates, he paid visits to various parts of the United Kingdom, and visited Italy, France, Turkey, and Germany. He received the following decorations: Knight Commander of the Order of St. Michael and St. George (KCMG) during an audience with King Edward VII on 8 August 1902, Star of the Russian Order of St. Anne, Star of the French Legion d'Honneur (Third Republic), Star of the Order of the Crown of Italy, Star of the Ottoman Order of Osmania.

=== Death ===
In the 1890s Makonnen had vowed to Saint Gabriel that he would build a church in the saint's honour if peace could be restored to the feuding communities of the Charchar mountains near Harar. When peace returned he built the church of Kulubi Gabriel, bringing its tabot from Bulga; it was consecrated on 26 July 1892. He kept a residence there for its cooler climate and reportedly prayed at the church on his way to Adwa in 1896. The shrine later grew into one of the largest pilgrimage sites of the Ethiopian Orthodox Täwahedo Church.

In early 1906 the governor of Italian Eritrea, Ferdinando Martini, was on an official visit to Ethiopia. Menelik II summoned Ras Makonnen to Addis Ababa. While travelling from Harar to Addis Ababa, Ras Makonnen came down with typhus. His officers brought him to Kulubi, where he died as daylight broke after having given his son Tafari Makonnen a whispered benediction. Menelik was said to be very distraught after hearing about the death of his cousin and intensely grieved for three days.

Makonnen was buried at the church of St Michael in Harar, and, as was customary, his household slaves were freed. His elder son, Yilma, succeeded him as Ras and governor of Harar but died on 12 October 1907; Tafari, the future Haile Selassie, was appointed governor of Harar in his own right in 1910.

== Monument to Ras Makonnen ==
The Monument to Ras Makonnen previously located in Harar was sculpted in 1959, by Antun Augustinčić, a Croatian sculptor active in former Yugoslavia and the United States. In June 2020 the equestrian Monument to Ras Makonnen was toppled and destroyed by Oromo mobs who participated in Hachalu Hundessa riots, following the death of Hachalu Hundessa. It is alleged the Harari Regional state police officers supported its removal. The event was also followed by smashing of the Statue of Ras Makonnen Wolde Mikael's son and Ethiopian leader Haile Selassie in Wimbledon park, UK. Referring to a statue in Addis Ababa of Menelik II, Hachalu told Oromia Media Network (OMN) said that people should remember that all the horses seen mounted by old rulers leaders belonged to the people.

== Notes ==
Footnotes

Citations
