= Ruggero Tracchia =

Italian general

- Born: 11 June 1884; Rome, Kingdom of Italy
- Died: 29 November 1955 (aged 71); Rome, Italy
- Military career
- Allegiance: Kingdom of Italy
- Branch: Royal Italian Army
- Rank: Major General
- Commands: 2nd Eritrean Brigade; 59th Infantry Division Cagliari; 62nd Infantry Division "Marmarica"
- Conflicts: Italo-Turkish War; Battle of Zanzur; First Italo-Senussi War; World War I; Senussi campaign; First Battle of Monte Grappa; Second Battle of Monte Grappa; Second Italo-Ethiopian War; First Battle of Tembien; Second Battle of Tembien; Battle of Maychew; World War II; North African campaign; Italian invasion of Egypt; Battle of Bardia
- Awards: Silver Medal of Military Valor (five times); Bronze Medal of Military Valor (twice); War Cross for Military Valor (twice); Military Order of Savoy

Ruggero Tracchia (11 June 1884 – 29 November 1955) was an Italian general during the Second Italo-Ethiopian War and World War II. He spent most of his career in Italy's African colonies.

== Biography ==
=== Early life and career ===
After enlisting in the Royal Italian Army and becoming an officer, he was sent to Eritrea in 1909. In 1911-1912 he participated in the Italo-Turkish War with the rank of Lieutenant, earning a Bronze Medal of Military Valor during the battle of Zanzur; after the end of the hostilities against the Ottoman Empire he remained in Libya and participated in the campaign against the Senussi rebels, being wounded in action and awarded a Silver Medal of Military Valor in December 1913. In 1916 he participated in the Senussi campaign, and later returned to Italy and fought on Monte Grappa in the final stages of World War I, with the rank of Major, earning another Silver and a Bronze Medal for his role in the fighting in January and June 1918. He continued his career after the war, and in 1930 he was appointed commander of the 30th Infantry Regiment "Pisa".

=== Ethiopia ===
In 1935, with the rank of colonel, he participated in the conquest of Ethiopia at the head of the 2nd Eritrean Brigade, participating in the battles of Tembien and of Maychew; he distinguished himself in the fighting and was promoted to brigadier general for war merit in May 1936. After the occupation of Addis Ababa, he was placed at the head of the commissariat of Debre Berhan, and tasked with suppressing the resistance by the Abyssinian ras who had not laid down their arms in the Scioa. Among them were Abebe Aregai and the Kassa brothers – Wondosson Kassa, Aberra Kassa, and Asfawossen Kassa – who from Selale supplied weapons to the guerrillas. The Arbegnoch operated near the road that connected Addis Ababa with the Gojjam, threatening the flow of supplies to the capital; the intensification of the actions of Aregai's men led the Italian command in to planning Operation F, aimed at capturing Fiche in order to secure the roads to Addis Ababa, but by early December 1936 nothing had been done, therefore Tracchia decided to take the matter into his own hands and act with the troops he had at his disposal. On 9 December he occupied Mendida, which he found deserted; nevertheless, he set fire to the buildings and crops of Aregai's family and his supporters. Immediately afterwards he occupied Dannebo, where he was joined by a column led by Colonel Amedeo Tosti. On December 13 the Italian troops occupied the villages of Abdella and Dirma, where they clashed with the Arbegnoch; 88 guerrillas were killed in action and twenty-three were executed after capture, and the two villages were razed. Altogether, from 9 to 15 December Tracchia's troops killed 126 Arbegnoch in battle and shot 72 more after capture, and captured a heavy machine gun, nine light machine guns and 1,557 rifles. Italian losses amounted to ten askari.

Tracchia then continued his advance towards Fiche, finding several villages burned by the retreating forces of Aregai; those that had been left intact, if suspected of hiding weapons, were destroyed, and the men executed. On 21 December Aberra and Asfawossen Kassa surrendered to Tracchia, having been promised by Hailu Tekle Haymanot (on behalf of Viceroy Rodolfo Graziani) that they would not be harmed; but Tracchia had them shot on the same day in the main square of Fiche. Afterwards, Tracchia established a military garrison in Fiche, leaving Colonel Arduino Garelli there as resident minister; he received the submission of the local clergy, ordered the reopening of the Amharic school, the establishment of a civilian hospital, and had subsidies distributed to the clergy and civilians. Altogether, 221 Ethiopian guerrillas had been killed in action during the campaign, and 162 more executed; a tank, a field gun, sixty-one machine guns and 6,073 rifles were captured. Italian losses amounted to 101 killed.

On 4 January 1937 Tracchia advanced from Fiche towards the Blue Nile, in order to subdue the entire region; resistance leaders such as Ilma Woldeyesus and Hailé Selassié Zerrofu were captured and shot. On 8 March Tracchia was replaced by Blackshirt Colonel Ferruccio Gatti as commander of the Debre Berhan garrison, taking over that of the garrison of Gur Sellassiè. Following the attempt on Viceroy Graziani’s life in Addis Ababa on 19 February 1937, Tracchia received the order to carry out a reprisal against the monastery of Debre Libanos, but the action was postponed till May and ended up being carried out by General Pietro Maletti instead. Tracchia was awarded a further two Silver Medals of Military Valor for his role in the conquest of Ethiopia.

=== World War II and later years ===
After returning to Italy, Tracchia was at disposal of the Ministry of the Colonies before becoming deputy commander of the 32nd Motorized Division Trento. He was then attached to the Bolzano Army Corps from August to September 1938, to the Rome Army Corps from September 1938 to February 1939, and to the Turin Army Corps from February to May 1939.

On 5 May 1939 Tracchia assumed command of the 59th Infantry Division Cagliari, stationed in Vercelli, which he maintained until 28 May 1940 (having been promoted to Major General in August 1939), when he was given command of the 62nd Infantry Division "Marmarica", stationed in Libya. In September 1940 he participated with his division in the Italian invasion of Egypt, then taking up position south of Sollum; following the start of the British counteroffensive in December 1940, the Marmarica Division was withdrawn to Bardia. On 3 January 1941 Commonwealth troops launched their assault on Bardia, which fell after two days of fighting. On 4 January Tracchia and General Alessandro De Guidi, commander of the 63rd Infantry Division "Cirene" , rejected a surrender offer by a British delegation, aimed at avoiding further bloodshed, but on the following day they were taken prisoner at their headquarters. Tracchia was transferred to a prisoner-of-war camp in Egypt and later to India, remaining in British captivity until 1944, when he was released following the signing of the Armistice of Cassibile.

In 1950 he was accused of war crimes by the Ethiopian government, but was never prosecuted. He died in Rome in 1955.
