= Arbegnoch =

Ethiopian resistance fighters during Italian East Africa

- Flag of the Arbegnoch partisans
- Leaders: Abebe Aregai; Belay Zeleke; Mengesha Jembere; Hailu Kebede †; Geresu Duki; Gebrehiwot Meshesha; Desta Damtew (executed); Mesfin Sileshi; Haile Mariam Mammo †; Wondosson Kassa (executed); Asfawossen Kassa †; Aberra Kassa (executed)
- Dates active: 1936–1941
- Allegiance: Ethiopia
- Active regions: Begemder, Gojjam, Wollo, Shewa, Welega, Kefa

The Arbegnoch (Amharic: ዐርበኞች, romanized: ārbenyoch, lit. 'Patriots') were Ethiopian resistance fighters who opposed the Italian occupation of Ethiopia during the period of Italian East Africa (1936–1941).

Resistance began during the final stages of the Second Italo-Ethiopian War but took a more organized form after the Italian capture of Addis Ababa in May 1936. The movement evolved in two phases: an initial stage of semi-conventional warfare led largely by remnants of the imperial army and members of the upper nobility, followed by a prolonged period of guerrilla warfare after 1937 led by regional chiefs, local leaders, and fighters drawn from the broader population.

Encouraged by the exiled emperor Haile Selassie, resistance groups spread across much of the country, from Gondar in the north to Omo region in the south. The patriots relied on guerrilla tactics such as ambushing Italian convoys, destroying roads and bridges, attacking isolated garrisons, and disrupting communications. They were supported by local populations who supplied food, intelligence, and recruits, while clandestine agents known as Wust Arbegnoch (Insider Patriots) operated in towns under Italian control.

Despite limited weapons and the absence of centralized leadership, the resistance significantly weakened Italian authority outside major towns. By tying down large numbers of Italian troops in garrisons, the Arbegnoch helped pave the way for the Allied offensive in East Africa during World War II. In 1941, British and Ethiopian forces re-entered Ethiopia, and Haile Selassie returned to Addis Ababa, marking the end of Italian rule and the restoration of Ethiopian independence.

== History ==
=== Italian invasion ===
A couple of months into the Second Italo-Ethiopian War on 9 December 1935, Ethiopian Minister of War Mulugeta Yeggazu ordered all chiefs in the north to undertake "patriotic resistance against the Italians for taking away the independence of Ethiopia". The Ethiopians first adopted guerrilla tactics in early 1936, when Ras Imru implemented a tactic of attrition through continuous guerrilla warfare. After deploying the bulk of his troops between Selekleka and Shire Enda Selassie, Imru sent several highly mobile units of 400 to 500 men to disrupt the Italian positions behind enemy lines. His men intercepted supply convoys and achieved important successes such as the annihilation of three bands of irregulars from the XXVII Eritrean Battalion, ambushing a convoy of vehicles near Damo Galilà, and destroying the ammunition depot at Mai Scium (whose explosion lost over 5,000 artillery shells and thousands of small arms rounds).

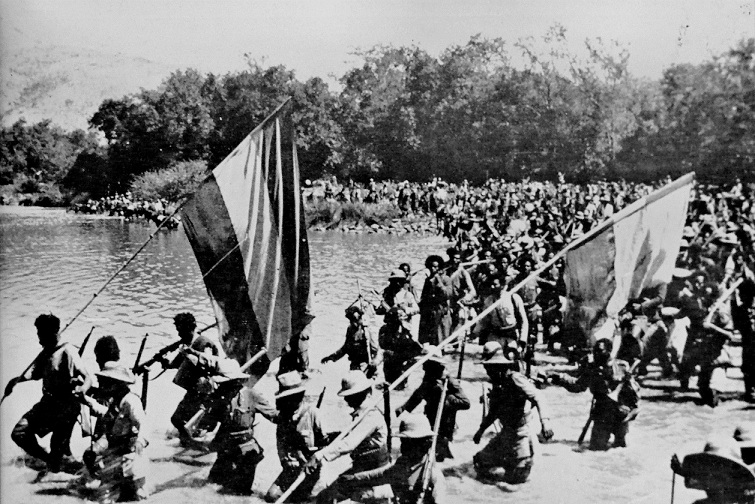
Arbegnoch forces crossing the Omo River, 1941.

As disruption increased, the Italians were forced to deploy more troops to Tigray, away from the campaign further south. The Italians began referring to the rebels as shifta, which roughly translates from Amharic to English as "bandit"; the word also has a connotation of "one who rebels against an unjust authority", while the Ethiopians referred to them as Arbegnoch (lit. 'Patriots'). Addis Ababa fell to the advancing Italians on 5 May 1936 and the Ethiopians withdrew to nearby areas to regroup; Abebe Aregai went to Ankober, Balcha Safo to Gurage, Zewdu Asfaw to Mulo, Blatta Takale Wolde Hawariat to Limmu and the Kassa brothers (Aberra, Wondosson, and Asfawossen) to Selale. Haile Mariam conducted hit-and-run attacks around the capital. Emperor Haile Selassie fled the country with 117 chests of gold ingots which were used to fund his court in exile and the Patriots' activities.

The emperor left 10,000 troops under the command of Aberra Kassa with orders to continue resistance. On 21 June, Kassa held a meeting with Bishop Abune Petros and several other Patriot leaders at Debre Libanos, about 70 km (43 mi) north of Addis Ababa. Plans were made to storm the occupied capital but a lack of transport and radio equipment made it impossible to mount a coordinated attack. The deposed government in Gore was never able to provide any meaningful leadership to the Patriots or remaining military formations but sporadic resistance was undertaken by independent groups around the capital.

=== Beginning of the guerrilla war ===
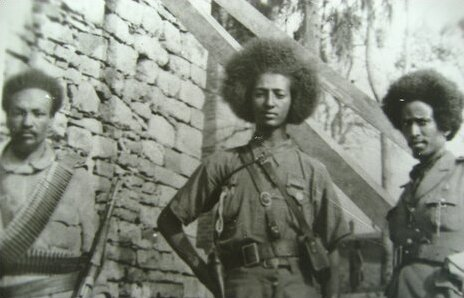
Patriots during the guerrilla period. In the center is future Ethiopian general Jagema Kello.

The situation in Addis Ababa in the first weeks after the conquest was difficult for the Italians; communications were possible only through the long route from Eritrea, violence and disorder were widespread within the city, while Marshal Rodolfo Graziani, initially having only 9,000 soldiers, feared an attack by Ethiopian guerrillas who were reported "all around Addis Ababa"; there were rumors that many thousands of Arbegnoch were ready to attack. The situation of the Italians improved in mid-July with the arrival of substantial reinforcements which increased the garrison to 35,000 men; moreover, new exhortations were arriving from Rome to the governor to extend the occupation and to "be harsh, implacable with all the Abyssinians", Mussolini called for a "regime of absolute terror".

The Arbegnoch of Shewa were actually determined to attack Addis Ababa. In a meeting in Debre Libanos, with the presence of Aberra Kassa, Abune Petros and other leaders, a rash plan was decided to assault the capital with five separate columns, counting above all on exploiting a general uprising of the population. The assault began on 28 July 1936 on a foggy morning but, despite some successes, the guerrillas failed to coordinate their attacks; while Aberra Kassa's men arrived by surprise without encountering resistance as far as the center of Addis Ababa where they unleashed panic, Fikre Mariam was stopped by the course of a flooded stream and then blocked by reinforced Italian units. In the meantime, Abebe Aregai's Arbegnoch initially advanced almost as far as Graziani's residence but were then attacked by Eritrean askaris, the last two Ethiopian columns failed on the first day even to enter into the city due to the nearby floods. Fighting in Addis Ababa continued until 30 July 1936, the Arbegnoch of the Kassa brothers courageously held their positions despite counterattacks by the Italian-Eritrean forces led by generals Italo Gariboldi and Sebastiano Gallina, finally the guerrillas had to flee the city, due to attacks from the air force. One of the Arbegnoch leaders, Abune Petros was captured and immediately executed by the Italians.

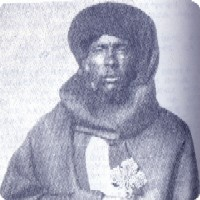
The bishop of Dessie, Abune Petros, was one of the leaders of the resistance in Shewa, he was executed by the Italians on 30 July 1936

While in Shewa the guerrillas dominated the countryside, the attempt to organize a solid resistance movement in the west of the Abyssinian territory was unsuccessful due to the opposition of the leaders of the Oromo population, who were traditionally hostile to Amhara rule. Marshal Graziani, urged by Mussolini, decided to intervene immediately in western Ethiopia by sending a small air expedition to Nekemte. On 26 June 1936 the Italian air expedition landed in Nekemte to meet with local Oromo chiefs who had wished to submit to Italian rule. The next night a group of guerrillas led by Kefle Nasibu and Belai Haile attacked the encamped Italians and massacred them. 12 Italians were killed and all of their aircraft were destroyed, and among the dead were Italian aviators Vincenzo Magliocco and Antonio Locatelli. Despite this success, the Italians managed to foment the general revolt of Oromo tribes and on 8 October 1936 they returned to Nekemte where they welcomed the submission of important local leaders.

=== Anti-guerrilla operations of 1936 ===
On 11 October 1936, the Minister of Colonies Alessandro Lessona had arrived in Addis Ababa, to confer personally with Marshal Graziani; regarding the tactics to be followed to crush the Ethiopian resistance and ensure total domination over the territory. After observing the ongoing fighting between guerrillas and Italian troops, the minister immediately entered into conflict with Graziani and the generals accused of not acting with the necessary energy to eliminate the resistance. The governor then issued new draconian orders stating that it was "time to put an end to weaknesses" and requesting to be regularly informed of the "number of people who have gone to arms". Lessona left Addis Ababa on 21 October while Marshal Graziani began the general autumn offensive against the guerrillas of Shewa.

On 27 October 1936, the Italians launched an offensive against the guerrillas near Ejere. Eritrean askaris overran the positions of the guerrillas and killed many of them, including the feared Ethiopian resistance leader Fikre Mariam. In the following weeks the Italians attacked the Shewan guerrillas in the Awash Valley, after fierce fighting, the Arbegnoch had to abandon the territories around the capital. The guerrillas of Gurage in southern Shewa led by Balcha Safo were attacked on 6 November 1936 by an Italian mechanized column led by Colonel Princivalle. After a valiant resistance the guerrillas were defeated and Balcha Safo was killed.

Imru Haile Selassie who was still resisting the Italians was forced to retreat south after the Welega Oromo submitted to Italian rule. The Italians followed him, and pinned him down on the north bank of the Gojeb River, where he surrendered on 19 December 1936. He surrendered together with the chiefs Keflè Nasibù and Belai Haile, and a group of "Youth Ethiopians". On this occasion, Marshal Graziani decided to spare the life of the Abyssinian leader who, after consultations with Rome, was declared a prisoner of war and then deported to Italy.

After the failed attack on Addis Ababa, Wondosson Kassa decided to take refuge with his men around Mount Abuna Yosef before resuming guerrilla warfare in September 1936 near the town of Lalibela. Marshal Graziani took brutal measures against this resistance group, also employing, according to the instructions of Minister Lessona, mustard gases that were used extensively on the villages between Lalibelà and Bilbolà Ghiorghis. Wondosson Kassa was finally intercepted with his men near the source of Tekezé River and on 10 December 1936 was captured by Wollo Oromo collaborators, in the same evening he was then executed. The two other Kassa brothers (Aberra and Asfawossen), had taken refuge in Fiche, most of their men went to join the resistance leader of Abebe Aregai, they had agreed to surrender to the Italians and were captured by the troops of Ruggero Tracchia on 21 December 1936. The two Abyssinian leaders were then executed on 18:35 on the same day.

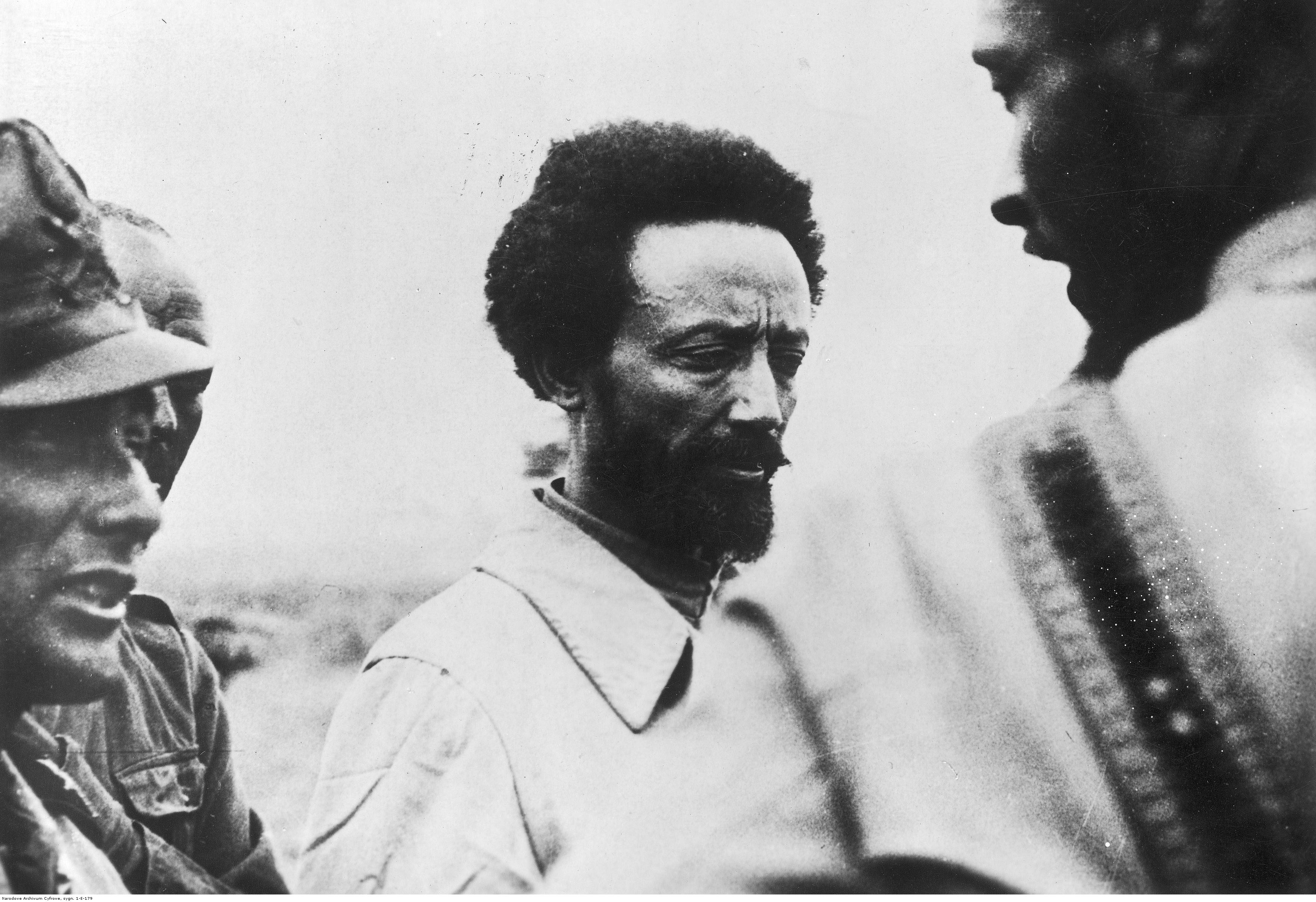
Ras Desta Damtew just before his execution, 24 February 1937

After the death of the Kassa brothers and the capture of Ras Imru, at the end of 1936 only Desta Damtew still remained active after having moved with about 2,000 men to the Sidamo region, in November he had repeatedly attacked the Italian forces of General Carlo Geloso before retreating to the mountainous region of Arbegona. With Dejazmach Gabremariam, Dejazmach Beyene Merid (Shum of modern Bale Province), and a dwindling number of soldiers, for the next few months Ras Desta eluded the Italians until they were trapped near Lake Shala in the Battle of Gogetti and annihilated. Wounded, Ras Desta managed to escape, only to be captured and hanged by Italian soldiers on 24 February 1937. With his body left hanging for days, the Italian authorities and the propaganda exalted the victory and the execution, which seemed to symbolize the definitive victory of fascist Italy.

=== Attack on Graziani and reprisals ===
On 19 February 1937 – Yekatit 12 according to the Ge'ez calendar – saw the attempted assassination of Marshal Graziani by Eritrean rebels Abraham Deboch and Mogos Asgedom in Addis Ababa. The Italian response was immediate. According to Mockler, "Italian carabinieri had fired into the crowds of beggars and poor assembled for the distribution of alms; and it is said that the Federal Secretary, Guido Cortese, even fired his revolver into the group of Ethiopian dignitaries standing around him". Hours later, Cortese gave the fatal order:

Comrades, today is the day when we should show our devotion to our Viceroy by reacting and destroying the Ethiopians for three days. For three days I give you carte blanche to destroy and kill and do what you want to the Ethiopians.

For the rest of that day, through Saturday and Sunday, Italians killed Ethiopians with daggers and truncheons to the shouts of "Duce! Duce!" and "Civiltà Italiana!" They doused native houses with petrol and set them on fire. They broke into the homes of local Greeks and Armenians and lynched their servants. Some even posed on the corpses of their victims to have their photographs taken. In three days, the Italians had killed between 1,400 and 30,000 Ethiopians in Addis Ababa alone.

The attempted murder provided the Italians with the reason to implement Mussolini's order, issued as early as 3 May 1936, for the summary execution of "The Young Ethiopians", the small group of intellectuals who had received college education from American and European colleges. The same day as the assassination, a military tribunal was set up, and by nightfall, 62 Ethiopians were tried and shot at the Alem Bekagn prison in Addis Ababa. "The Graziani Massacre marked the almost total liquidation of the intellectual component of the Resistance", writes Bahru Zewde.

Thousands of Ethiopians of all classes were sent to detention camps at Danan in the Ogaden and Nokra in the Dahlak Archipelago. Conditions at Danan were inhospitable, and Graziani had given orders that the prisoners would receive only the bare minimum of food and water. As Sbacchi notes, "Poor facilities, including latrines, the humid climate, malaria, stomach infections, and venereal disease took many lives, especially among those compelled to work on the irrigation canal or on the banana and sugar-cane plantations", Between ten percent and half of the prisoners died at Danan.

Conditions at Nokra were even worse than at Danan, according to Sbacchi. The detainees sent there joined 500 prisoners serving life sentences for serious political crimes, increasing the total number incarcerated to 1,500. The inmates suffered from lack of fresh water, sunstroke, marsh fever, and dysentery.

The climax of the violence was reached in May 1937 with the tragic events of the Debre Libanos massacre. Investigators found that Abraha and Mogus had stayed a while at Debra Libanos, and slight circumstantial evidence suggested that the monks had foreknowledge of their plans. Marshal Graziani decided to retaliate by striking the sacred place of Debre Libanos. On the morning of 21 May 1937, Muslim Libyan and Somali askaris (45th Muslim Colonial Battalion) led by General Pietro Maletti executed 297 monks and 23 laymen. Three days later they would mow down 129 deacons, thus bringing the number of victims to 449. Maletti sent Graziani a telegram with the inscription "Complete liquidation", as proof of the massacre, and Graziani communicated the new number of those executed in Rome.

However, the violence of the repression and the apparent successes of the "colonial police" operations did not consolidate the Italian domination in Ethiopia in a decisive way, on the contrary, the growing brutality exasperated the population and increased hostility towards the Italians.

=== Lasta revolt ===
A rebellion in Lasta led by Hailu Kebede was initiated in the summer of 1937, this rebellion would progressively extended to other Ethiopian regions, the guerrillas proclaimed holy war against the Italians in response to the massacres of Coptic Christians by Muslim askaris following the assassination attempt on Marshal Graziani. By the month of August 1937, two Italian brigades were forced to withdraw from Begemder due to increased guerrilla attacks and in Gojjam forces under Belay Zeleke successfully raided colonial garrisons. Major Liverani's column was destroyed by the warriors of Abebe Aregai, Mesfin Scilesci and Haile Mariam Mammo near Ankober. Hailu Kebede especially in the month of August achieved important successes; his guerrillas attacked and annihilated several garrisons, while in September they inflicted heavy losses on a colonial battalion and devastated the Quoram communications center along the main Asmara-Addis Ababa road.

Marshal Graziani, surprised and shocked by the sudden bad news, seemed unable to control the situation and indulged in recriminations, especially against the governor of Amhara Governorate, Alessandro Pirzio Biroli. The news of the Ethiopian revolt aroused strong emotion in Italy as well; Mussolini urged Graziani's return to Addis Ababa and sent reinforcements, while Minister Lessona authorized the use of "every means" against the rebels, "including gas". On 19 September Marshal Graziani finally managed to concentrate large forces in Lasta and began the repression against the bands of Hailu Kebede who suffered attacks from the air force and mustard gas; the guerrillas abandoned Sekota and were surrounded, Kebede after a tough resistance was finally captured by colonial soldiers on 24 September 1937 and was executed by beheading.

Marshal Graziani returned to the capital on 3 October 1937, but despite the end of the Lasta revolt, the guerrilla warfare was spreading in Begemeder, Gojjam and Semien, many garrisons and isolated Italian residences were attacked and destroyed. Governor Pirzio Biroli was unable to restore order. The guerrillas obtained important successes in Gojjam under the leadership of Belay Zekele and Mengesha Gembere, on 13 and 14 September many Italian garrisons were attacked and surrounded and on 3 November the leaders of the revolt issued a proclamation stating that "all of Ethiopia is in revolt to expel the Italians". In December 1937 the governor made another attempt to regain control of the Gojjam but the new offensive immediately began with a disaster when on December 7 Colonel Barbacini's column was attacked and disrupted by the forces of Mengesha Gembere, two colonial battalions were surrounded and destroyed by the guerrillas.

On 10 November 1937, Mussolini privately informed Graziani that he believed that "his task is over" and announced his recall and the appointment of Duke of Aosta. Despite the viceroy's protests, Mussolini stood by his decisions, he informed the Prince Amedeo, Duke of Aosta of his forthcoming assignment and appointed General Ugo Cavallero, military superior commander over East Africa. The Duke of Aosta was appointed by Mussolini to replace Graziani as Viceroy of Italian East Africa. He was more open-minded than his predecessor and well-suited to encourage the co-operation of the Ethiopian public, he assumed his responsibilities on 22 December 1937.

=== The anti-guerrilla operations of 1938 ===
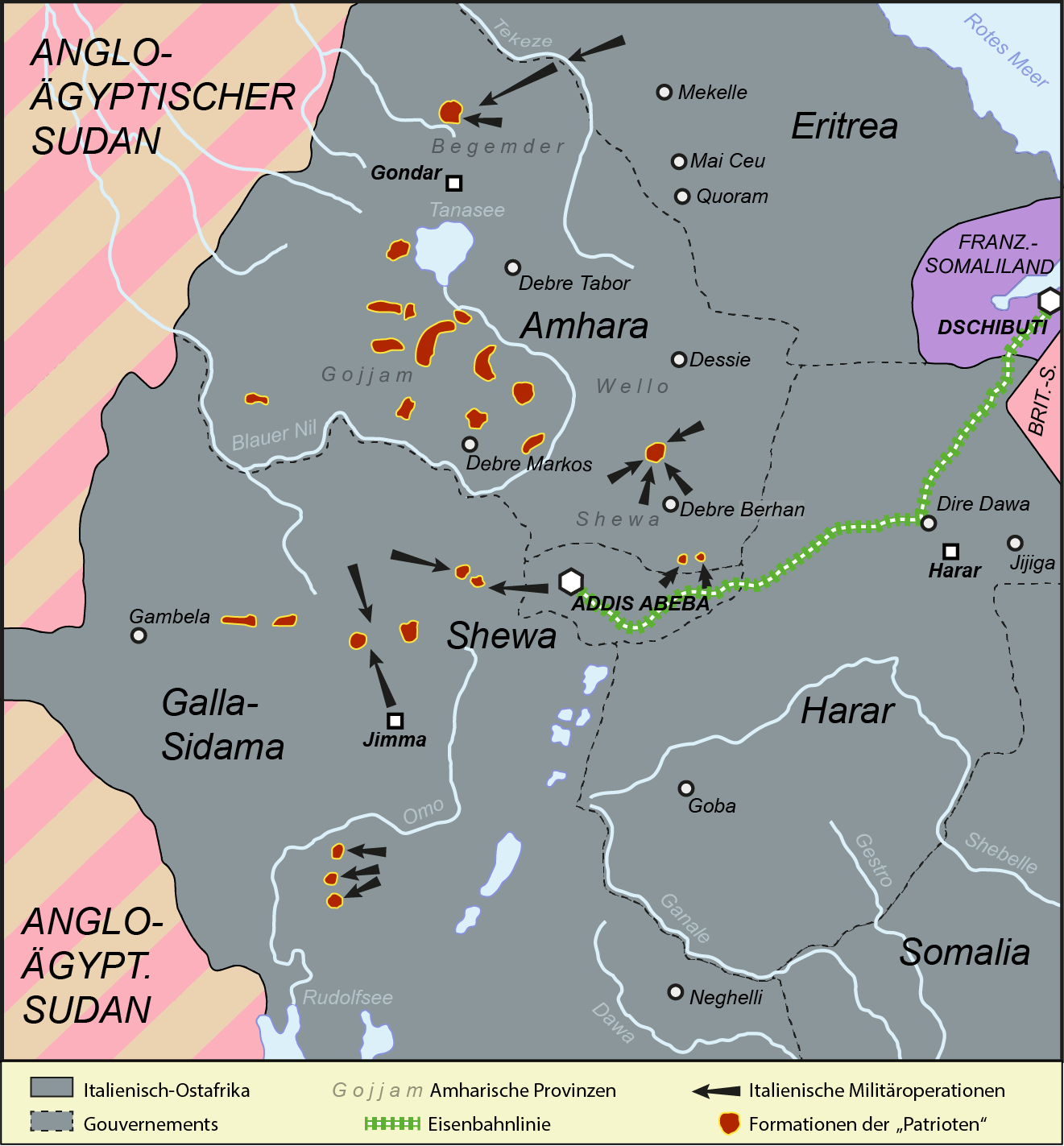
Territory under control of the Ethiopian resistance, December 1937

The Italians entrusted anti-guerrilla operations mainly to the colonial brigades of askaris, manned by Italian officers and non-commissioned officers and made up of Eritrean, Somali, or Libyan troops used to moving and fighting in East Africa. In addition to the colonial brigades, the Italians also employed local irregular bands led by Italian officers, who were entrusted with the most violent repressive tasks. These troops, showed weaknesses in their organization and cohesion and suffered from high rates of desertion.

General Cavallero prepared an ambitious plan of global operations to crush the Abyssinian resistance before the beginning of the heavy rains. The new cycle of operations began on 19 January 1938 in Gojjam which was attacked from the north and south by three separate columns while other forces blocked the fords on the Nile to prevent the guerrillas from escaping. Despite the considerable deployment of forces, the campaign did not achieve definitive results. The garrisons besieged by the guerrillas were relieved and the prolonged clashes at Gojjam against the men of Belay Zekele, Mengesha Gembere, and Meslin Scilesci ended in March 1938 with the retreat of the guerrillas who dispersed throughout the territory. In the month of April, the Italian-Eritrean columns joined Debra Markos and continued vast mopping-up operations against the resistance leaders of Mengesha Gembere and Belay Zekele who had, according to Italian sources, suffered over 2,300 casualties, but still managed to escape the operation. General Cavallero's forces were able to occupy the territory, increase the garrisons and extend the lines of communication but in turn had 350 dead and 1,200 wounded in five months in Gojjam, mostly askaris and colonial troops.

In June 1938, Italian forces encircled Ankober and the surrounding highlands in an attempt to pacify resistance in the region. Haile Mariam was the only Patriot leader who decided to try and effect a break-out and with 500 men he assaulted the Italians in a futile attempt to breach their cordon. He was mortally wounded on 6 June during a major clash at Gorfo in Bulga. On 1 June, General Ugo Cavallero moved north to surround Abebe, and keep him from returning to Menz, and although Abebe made three unsuccessful attempts to break through the Italian lines before the rainy season, after the rains his Arbegnoch were able to return to the comparative safety of Menz. Equally unsatisfactory were the actions of repression of the guerrilla led by the Balambaras Geresu Duki, the leader of the resistance in southern Shewa. On 23 October 1938, four Italian columns, preceded by aerial bombardments, began a concentric maneuver in the region to crush the Arbegnoch of Geresu Duki. At first the operation achieved some results; the Italo-Eritreans carried out vast roundups, killed 866 rebels and acted, according to the directives of the viceroy and of Mussolini himself, "with the utmost energy", but in the end even Geresu Duki escaped, together with his guerrillas, from the hunt of the occupying forces. At the same time in Begemder and in Gojjam the revolt had already begun to intensify; the Arbegnoch in Gojjam ambushed two colonial battalions and in Amhara attacked Italian settlers on the Gondar-Debre Tabor road, which remained permanently threatened by guerrillas.

=== Guerrilla warfare on the eve of World War II ===
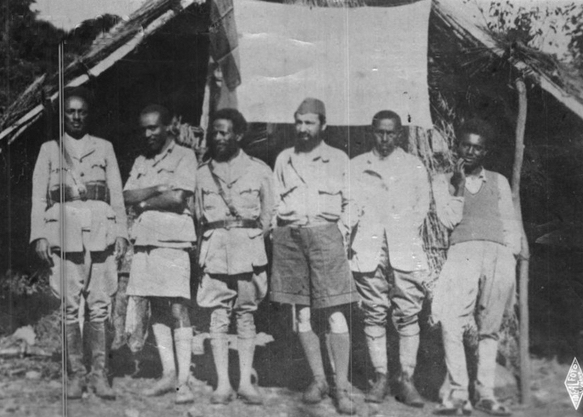
Italian Communist Ilio Barontini with Ethiopian guerrillas in Gojjam, February 1939

The repressive operations of 1938 therefore did not obtain decisive results, moreover, in this period the contrasts between the Duke of Aosta were accentuated, convinced of the need to reduce the violence and brutality of the fight against the guerrillas, and General Cavallero determined to maintain operational control of the war against the guerrillas, in Rome Mussolini expressed his discontent with the situation in East Africa. In early 1939 the senior commander in East Africa therefore resumed major military operations against the resistance by organizing an ambitious operation against the fighters of Abebe Aregai, General Cavallero entrusted Colonel Orlando Lorenzini colonial forces to mop up Menz, however, the results were not conclusive, the main guerrilla leaders escaped the roundup which lasted until the end of March 1939. Furthermore, on 9–11 April 1939, the Italian-Eritrean troops began a new episode of brutal violence against civilians who were following the fleeing Arbegnoch bands; in the Gaia-Zeret massacre, approximately 1,200-1,500 Ethiopians, the vast majority of whom were civilians taking refuge in a cave, were killed with gas or machine gun fire. Due to the failure of his strategy, General Cavallero was finally recalled to Italy on 10 April 1939 and replaced by General Luigi De Biase, while General Guglielmo Nasi, a supporter of a severe policy towards the indigenous population, became vice-governor general.

In December 1938, the Communist Party of Italy had already sent a mission to Ethiopia to assess the situation, make contact with the Ethiopian guerrillas and start a training program. Giuseppe Di Vittorio spoke about it with Spanish Civil War veteran Anton Ukmar in the winter of 1937 and the decision was made on 8 December 1938, the first to leave and reach Ethiopia via Khartoum was Ilio Barontini who in February 1939 was already able to send a confident report on the qualities and determination of the Abyssinian fighters. In the spring Ukmar and Domenico Rolla also left, accompanied by the French secret agent Colonel Paul Robert Monnier and by the envoy of the Negus Lorenzo Taezaz. After meeting in May 1939 in Abyssinian territory, Ukmar and Barontini split to begin their collaborative and training projects; the Ukmar mission was established in Gojjam and in the Gondar area, while Barontini, who acted under the pseudonym of "Paul Langlois" or "Paolo De Bargili", entered into contact with Mengesha Gembere and his guerrillas.

In 1938, France and Great Britain had begun to covertly support the Ethiopian guerrillas to undermine the precarious authority of the Italians. In France the government approved a program of "subversive war" and made contact with Abebe Aregai and Geresu Duki; French and British senior officers met in Aden in June 1939 and established a precise military programme against Italy in East Africa which included, among other things, "support for a general revolt in Ethiopia" by supplying weapons and ammunition. In the spring of 1939 the British finally took the first operational measures: General William Platt, the superior commander in Sudan, requested funding from London to supply weapons to the resistance, while General Archibald Wavell, supreme commander of the Middle East theatre, decided to entrust Brigadier General Daniel Arthur Sandford with an organic project to help the Arbegnoch. General Sandford reached Khartoum in October 1939 and took the first concrete measures by organizing arms depots on the border between Sudan and Ethiopia and entering into contact with some leaders of the resistance including Mengesha Gembere and Taffere Zelleche.

During 1939, while the international political situation was rapidly degenerating towards general war, in East Africa the Duke of Aosta adopted a somewhat more "liberal" policy against Arbegnoch guerrilla with negotiations to obtain the peaceful submission of the guerrilla leaders. The attempts of the Duke of Aosta and General Nasi to obtain the submission of the guerrilla leaders by means of negotiations obtained some results: Zewdie Asfaw and Olana Dinkel reached an agreement with the Italian authorities and renounced the rebellion. On the other hand, the long and complex attempts to convince Ras Abebe Aregai, who had by now become the main leader of the Arbegnoch and maintained relations with the French in Djibouti, to renounce the fight, did not achieve success. It seems that in some circumstances he agreed to start negotiations above all to gain time and obtain weapons and supplies; all contacts with Abebe Aregai sought by high-ranking Italian envoys, including General De Biase, came to nothing; the Ethiopian leader did not show up at the summit meeting scheduled for 14 March 1940.

=== East African campaign ===
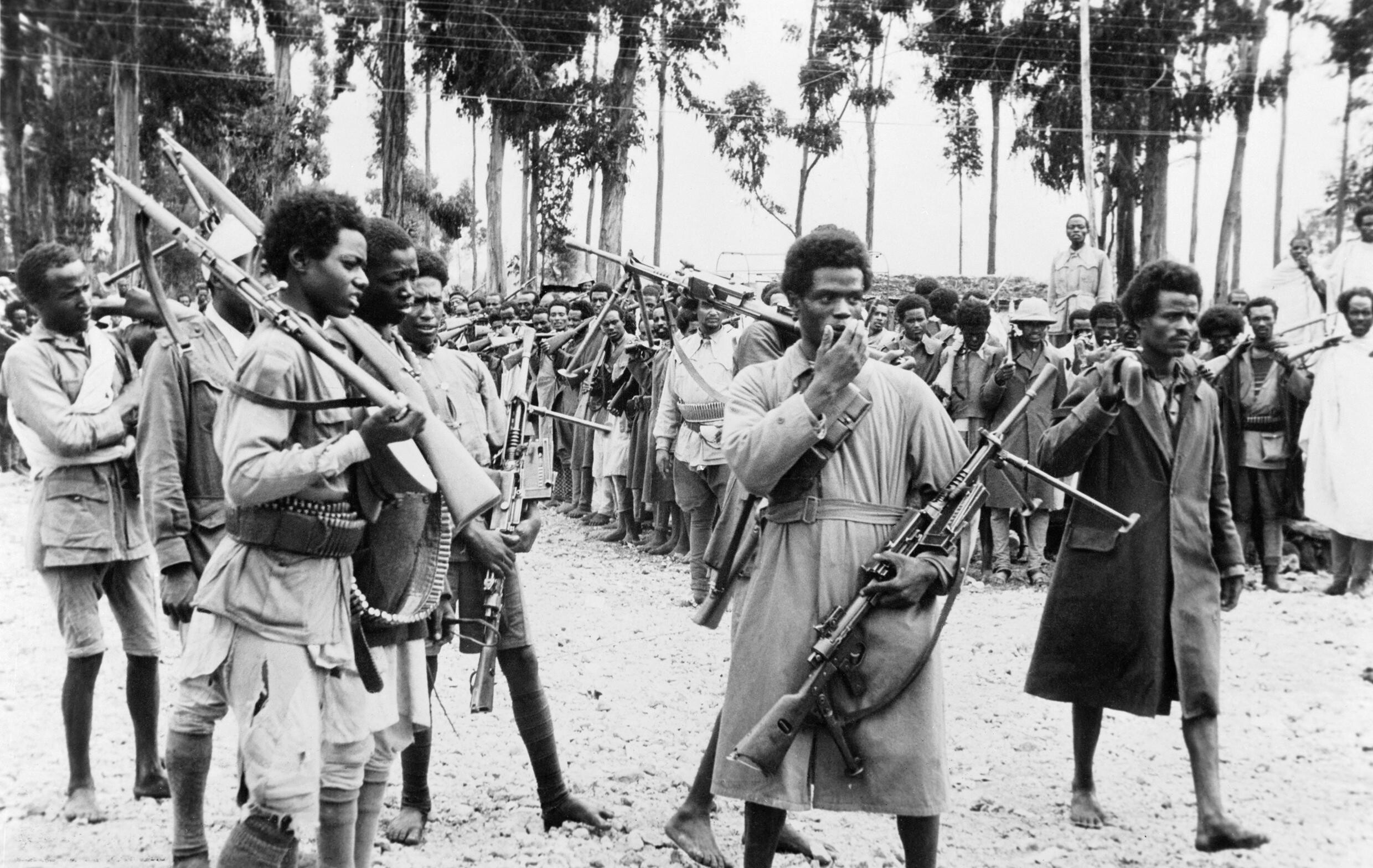
Arbegnoch gather in Addis Ababa to hear the proclamation announcing the return to the capital of the Emperor Haile Selassie in May 1941.

The beginning of the Second World War in East Africa was characterized by a series of Italian victories during the invasion of British Somaliland, however, these successes could not change the overall strategic situation, which was clearly favorable to Great Britain. Without aid and supplies from Italy, the Duke of Aosta and the military leaders of the empire soon understood that they would have to face the powerful general offensive of the enemy. After a few months from the start of the war, the resistance of the Arbegnoch resumed with increased intensity, extending its guerrilla actions to areas previously thought to be pacified, such as Galla and Sidamo, where attacks by the "patriots" began. The Arbegnoch were also finally bolstered by the arrival of weapons and Ethiopian emissaries sent by the British to encourage the intensification of guerrilla warfare. New leaders, such as Seyaka Bekele, joined the veterans of the resistance and inflicted a series of local defeats on the Italian-Eritrean columns. Soon, the Italian settlers, threatened by the activities of the Arbegnoch, had to abandon all the rural areas and retreat to the larger urban centers.

While the situation of the Italians in East Africa was becoming increasingly difficult, the British political-military leadership, after some initial hesitation, had finally taken the decision to energetically support the insurrectional war in Ethiopia by authorizing the Negus Haile Selassie to return to the theatre of operations. He was first transferred to Egypt where he arrived incognito with the pseudonym of Mister Strong on 25 June 1940 and then arrived in Khartoum on 2 July accompanied by a few loyal followers and by the British officials George Steer and Edwin Chapman-Andrews. In the capital of Sudan, the Negus, now identified as Mister Smith, came into contact with emissaries of the resistance leaders and issued a first proclamation to the Ethiopian population on 8 July 1940 in which he praised the courage of the "chiefs and warriors of Ethiopia", made it known that their suffering was about to end thanks to the help of the "incomparable military power" of Great Britain which would allow them to regain independence; the Negus also appealed to the Eritrean population to join the "Ethiopian brothers" in the fight against the Italians.

The British commitment to the Ethiopian resistance was further strengthened after the visit of the Foreign Secretary Anthony Eden to Khartoum; during the conference of 28 October 1940 with General Archibald Wavell and Alan Cunningham and with Field Marshal Jan Smuts, the final decision was taken to support the return of the Negus, to consider the guerrilla warfare as a "war of liberation", above all to supply the fighters with weapons and equipment; furthermore, Mission 101 would be strengthened with the sending of the eccentric and capable Colonel Orde Wingate. In a short time, deliveries of weapons to the Arbegnoch began and training centres were opened on the border of Sudan, while Colonel Wingate went to Gojjam where he made agreements with General Sandford before returning to Cairo to form the so-called Gideon Force, tasked with penetrating Ethiopia and bringing Haile Selassie back to power.

The offensive began in January 1941, the British offensive immediately achieved decisive tactical successes which demonstrated the clear inferiority and weakness of the Italian forces. In the northern sector, Indian troops under General William Platt, after the initial advance in the lowlands up to Agordat, had to fight hard to overcome the fierce Italian-Eritrean resistance in the prolonged Battle of Keren, after which they occupied Asmara on 1 April and Massawa on 8 April. In the south, South African and Nigerian troops easily overcame Italian-Somali defenses along the Jubba River, and entered Mogadishu on February 25 with minimal resistance as the Italian-colonial forces quickly disintegrated. Italian domination in East Africa was rapidly collapsing; while the troops showed signs of demoralization and many colonial units deserted, the Ethiopian resistance intensified its activity and in Shoa the uprising of the population became general coinciding with the spread of news of the British advance. The guerrillas attacked the Italian units retreating from the southern front who were trying to regroup to the capital. The Duke of Aosta had decided that the defense of Addis Ababa was now impossible and had therefore ordered the retreat with the surviving troops; he intended to open negotiations with the British to cede the capital in an orderly fashion and safeguard the lives of the 35,000 Italian residents, including 11,000 women and children. On 1–3 April, the Italian troops therefore evacuated Addis Ababa and withdrew, in an atmosphere of general collapse. On 5 April, the South Africans reached the outskirts of the city, and were later joined by Nigerian troops and the Arbegnoch bands of Abebe Aregai. On 6 April, they entered Addis Ababa without encountering resistance, and on 5 May 1941, exactly five years after the fall of Addis Ababa, Haile Selassie arrived at the capital together with Wingate's Gideon Force. At 3.30 pm, the Negus entered the capital in an open car, welcomed by the population; The Arbegnoch of Abebe Aregai, about 7,000 guerrillas, escorted the imperial procession during its passage through the city streets.

In the following months, after the liberation of the capital and the return of the Negus, the last nuclei of resistance of the Italian armed forces in East Africa fell; on 19 May 1941 the Duke of Aosta surrendered at Battle of Amba Alagi together with General Claudio Trezzani; General Pietro Gazzera ceased resistance at the Siege of Saïo on 3 July 1941, while General Guglielmo Nasi, after a prolonged and fierce resistance at Battle of Gondar, finally had to lay down his arms on 27 November 1941.

== Sources ==
- Abbink, Gerrit Jan; De Bruijn, Mirjam; Van Walraven, Klass, eds. (2003). Rethinking Resistance: Revolt and Violence in African History. African Dynamics. Vol. II (illus. ed.). Brill. ISBN 978-90-04-12624-4.
- Abbink, Jon (December 1998). "An Historical-anthropological Approach to Islam in Ethiopia: Issues of Identity and Politics" (PDF). Journal of African Cultural Studies. XI (2). ISSN 1469-9346.
- Akyeampong, Emmanuel Kwaku; Gates, Henry Louis, eds. (2012). Dictionary of African Biography. Vol. II. Oxford University Press USA. ISBN 978-0-19-538207-5.
- Barker, A. J. (1971). Rape of Ethiopia, 1936. London: Ballantine Books. ISBN 978-0-345-02462-6.
- Del Boca, Angelo (1969). The Ethiopian War 1935–1941 (Eng. trans. ed.). Chicago: The University of Chicago Press. ISBN 978-0-226-14217-3.
- Forgacs, David (2014). Italy's Margins: Social Exclusion and Nation Formation since 1861. Cambridge Social and Cultural Histories. Vol. XX (illus. ed.). Cambridge University Press. ISBN 978-1-107-05217-8.
- Iliffe, John (2005). Honour in African History (illus. ed.). Cambridge University Press. ISBN 978-0-521-54685-0.
- Milkias, Paulos (2011). Ethiopia. Nations in Focus. ABC-CLIO. ISBN 978-1-59884-258-6.
- Mockler, Anthony (2003). Haile Selassie's War (illus. repr. ed.). Signal Books. ISBN 978-1-902669-53-3.
- Phillips, Matt; Carillet, Jean-Bernard (2006). Ethiopia & Eritrea (illus. ed.). Lonely Planet. ISBN 978-1-74104-436-2.
- Shillington, Kevin (2012). History of Africa (3rd, rev. ed.). Palgrave Macmillan. ISBN 978-1-137-00333-1.
