= Kassa (name) =

Kassa is an Ethiopian name that may refer to

Given name

- Kassa (mansa) (died 1360), African ruler
- Kassa Balcha (born 1955), Ethiopian long-distance runner
- Kassa Haile Darge (1881–1956), Ethiopian nobleman and military commander
- Tewodros II (born Kassa Haile Giorgis; c.1818–1868), Emperor of Ethiopia
- Kassa Korley (born 1993), American chess player

Surname

- Aberra Kassa (1905–1936), Ethiopian royalty and army commander
- Abraha Kassa, Director of National Security for Eritrea
- Asrate Kassa (1922–1974), Ethiopian royalty and army commander
- Asfawossen Kassa (1913–1936), Ethiopian royalty and army commander
- Wondosson Kassa (1903–1936), Ethiopian royalty and army commander

Fictional

- Kassa, known as Cassian Andor in the Star Wars franchise.
