= Darge =

Darge is a surname. Notable people with the surname include:

- Darge Sahle Selassie (1825/27/30–1900), Ethiopian nobleman, governor, general and councillor
- Kassa Haile Darge (1881–1956), Shewan nobleman
- Keb Darge (born 1957), Scottish DJ
- Rory Darge (born 2000), Scotland rugby union player
- Tisseme Darge, daughter of Darge Sahle Selassie, Prince of Selale
- Tsehaiwork Darge, daughter of Darge Sahle Selassie, Prince of Selale
