= Fiche =

Fiche may refer to:

- Fiche (film), short for microfiche, a flat film containing micro-images.
- Fiche (cards), a rectangular counter used in French and Danish card games.
- Fiche, Ethiopia, a town in Ethiopia.
