= Abune Petros =

Ethiopian bishop and martyr (1882–1936)

- Native name: አቡነ ጴጥሮስ
- Province: Wollo and Menz
- Diocese: East Ethiopia

Orders
- Ordination: 1916
- Consecration: 29 May 1929 by Pope John XIX of Alexandria

Personal details
- Born: Haile Maryam; 1882 Fiche, Shewa, Ethiopian Empire
- Died: 30 July 1936 (aged 53–54) Addis Ababa, Italian East Africa
- Denomination: Ethiopian Orthodox Tewahedo

Sainthood
- Venerated in: Ethiopia
- Beatified: 1940s onward

Abune Petros (Ge'ez: አቡነ ጴጥሮስ; born Haile Maryam; 1882 – 29 July 1936) was an Ethiopian bishop and martyr, who was known for his execution by firing squad in 1936 by Fascist Italian troops for his resistance to the Italian invasion of Ethiopia.

== Early life ==
Abune Petros was born in Fiche, north Addis Ababa. He grew up in a peasant family and was educated from elementary school to the highest stage of ecclesiastical education at the monastery of Debre Libanos, where he took vows in the Ethiopian Orthodox Tewahedo Church, and became a monk in 1916.

== Career ==
He started his teaching career at the monastery of Meskabe Kedusan in Amhara Sayint in Wollo Province, and later he moved to Debre-Menkerat monastery in Welayta, South Ethiopia, where he was authorized by the church as the teacher in charge. In 1924 he was appointed as a professor at the monastery church of Mary, on an island in Lake Zeway, southern Ethiopia. In 1927 he was assigned as memher of Menbere Leul Markos Church in the compound of the then Gennete Le’ul Imperial Palace at 6 Kilo where he became the spiritual father of Ras Tafari (later Emperor Haile Selassie).

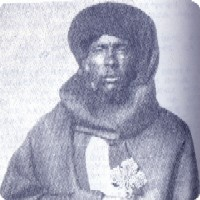

His sermons were known and appreciated by the local population. He spent a lot of time in monasteries around the city of Dessie and the region of Wereilu. He was also well known for his teaching and preaching to the people around the region to seek first the kingdom of God. One of his preaching was Colossians 3:12 "Therefore, as God’s chosen people, holy and dearly loved, clothe yourselves with compassion, kindness, humility, gentleness and patience." His sermons and preaching was very popular and insightful to the people in the area and the monastery. In 1928 at St. Marks Monastery, Alexandria, he was nominated to be one of the four bishops for Ethiopia and given the title and name Abune Petros. He then was assigned as the bishop of the central and eastern part of Ethiopia, where he continued to preach the gospel. Abune Petros was used to fasting and praying a lot.

== Resistance to Italian occupation ==
In 1935, Italian troops invaded Ethiopia. Aboune Petros went with Emperor Haile Selassie I at the northern war front where he assisted the wounded. He attended the violence used by the fascists in particular against civilians. Following the Italian victory at the Battle of Maychew, Ethiopian Patriots fold to areas in the south and Abune Petros went to the Monastery of Debre Libanos. He used to question the ongoing war "how Italy, a Christian country, would occupy in such a brutal manner another Christian peaceful country, Ethiopia?"

Bishop of Dessie at the end of the Ethiopian war he decided to support the nascent Ethiopian resistance and refused to submit to the Italian authorities, he then joined the arbegnoch of Aberra Kassa, one of the sons of Ras Kassa who directed the guerrilla warfare in Shoa. At a meeting in Debre Libanos, with the presence of Aberra Kassa, Abebe Aregai and other leaders, a rash plan was decided to assault the capital with five separate columns, counting above all on exploiting a general uprising of the population. The attack failed and Abune Petros was captured by the Italians on 29 July 1936.

== Martyrdom ==
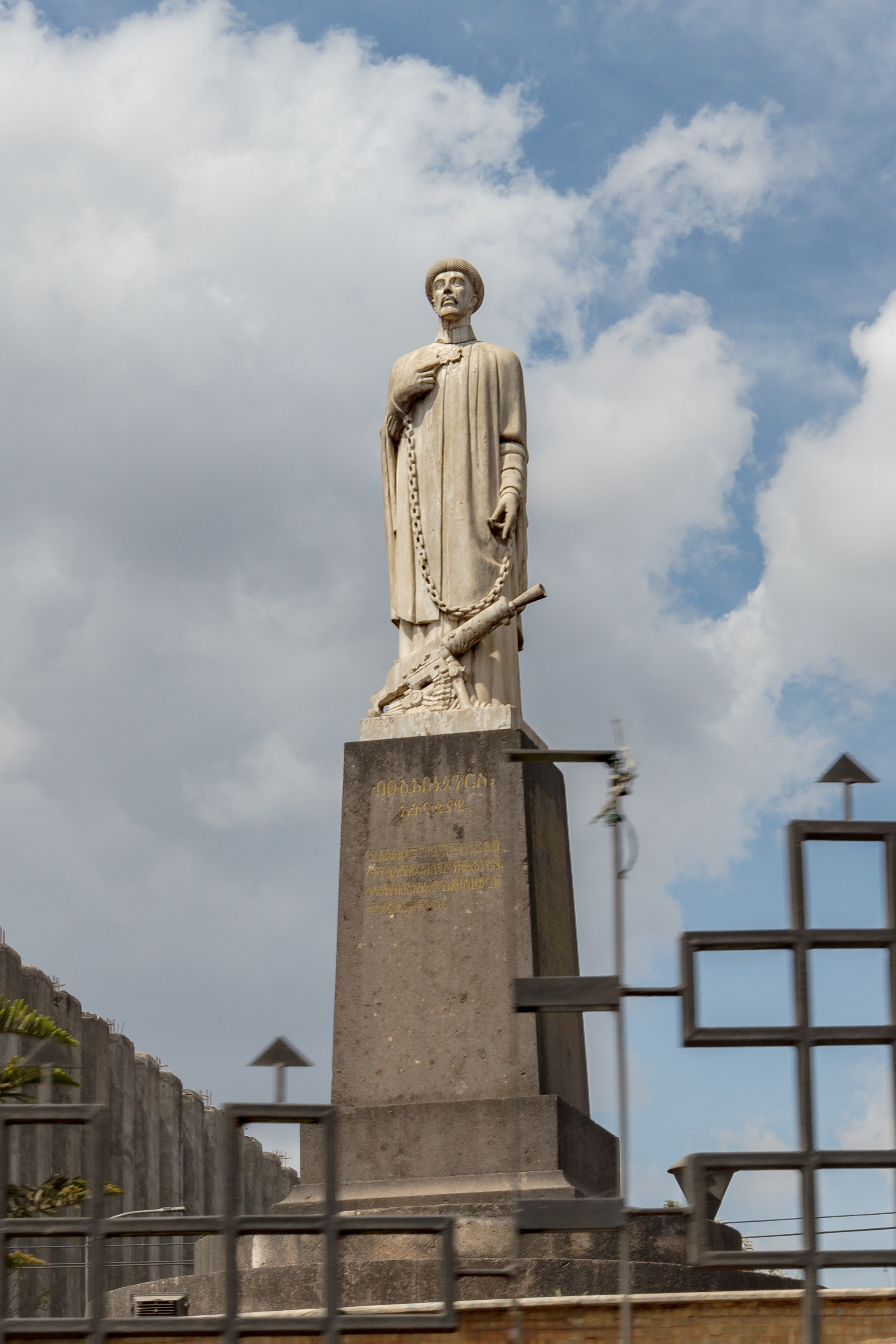
Statue of St. Abune Petros in Addis Ababa, Ethiopia.

With the opportunities he had, Abune Petros preached both Ethiopians and Italian soldiers about "peace, love and freedom". Abune Petros was captured by the Italians on 29 July 1936. Before his execution, the authorities gave him a final offer: if he ceases to denounce the Italian invasion and if he agrees to publicly condemn Ethiopian patriots, he would be released. He refused and said:

The tears of my countrymen caused by your gas and your machines will never allow my conscience to accept your ultimatum. How could I stand before God if I do not condemn a crime of such magnitude?

After a quick trial, Abune Petros was sentenced to death for rebellion and inciting others to rebel.The judge asked them, “When the priests and ecclesiastical authorities, including the Archbishop Abune Kerlos, acknowledged the sovereignty of the Italian government and said Amen, why did you rebel? Why did you become a rebel alone?”

Abune Petros replied as follows:

“Abune Kerlos is an Egyptian; he has nothing to do with Ethiopia and Ethiopians. But I am an Ethiopian. I am a responsible church father. Therefore, I am concerned about my country and my church. I have nothing else to present to you. I will only speak what I say to my Creator. I know that you have decided to kill me. Therefore, do whatever you wish with me. But do not touch my followers.”

The news spread rapidly in the country and Ethiopians gathered in Addis Ababa to greet him one last time. The fascist fearing rebellion and an attempt to release him, decided to move as forward as possible the date of his execution. On the evening of 30 July 1936, he was taken to a public square, where a large crowd gathered. During his last speech, he said:

My countrymen, do not believe the fascists telling you that the Patriots are bandits, the Patriots are people who are fighting to free us from the terror of fascism. Bandits are the soldiers who are in front of me and you, who have come from far, terrorize and violently occupy a weak and peaceful country: our Ethiopia. God gives to the people of Ethiopia the strength to resist and never bow to the Fascist army and its violence.

The pagan fascist government has come to burn the church, kill the Christian people, destroy our religion, and ruin our history. Do not submit to these tyrants; they have not come for good or to bring us true judgment. Defend yourselves for your beloved country and your righteous faith. Before your freedoms are violated, your death and your name will be blessed; you will get a great and valuable honor.

An Ethiopian land can never accept the orders of the invading army. Land of Ethiopia; I condemn you if you accept such an invasion. If the land of Ethiopia receives the enemy, let it be cursed. Let it be destroyed in the name of my Creator, Jesus Christ.”

Shortly after, Abune Petros was ordered to sit on a chair and shot with bullets by many Italian soldiers. He then became a national martyr in Ethiopia. Following this, many Ethiopians joined patriots and continued war with Italian soldiers for freedom, which was made possible by 5 May 1941.

Today, Abune Petros remains a famous figure in Ethiopian history. A memorial statue is erected in 1946 near St. George's Cathedral, Addis Ababa and the author Tsegaye Gebre-Medhin wrote a play on his last days. He now also is named as "Saint Abune Petros" by the Ethiopian Orthodox Church and a church is built by his name.

This is the statue inscription translated into English:

In honor of the great and holy martyr father, the Holy Synod of the Ethiopian Orthodox Tewahedo Church, five years ago, approved him as a saint/martyr giving the title of sainthood in his name, and decided to build a church in his name with an ark carved in his name. This decision of the Holy Synod was implemented in the city of Fiche, Selale Region, North Shewa, where he was born. The martyr, Blessed Abune Petros, is a patriot, hero, bishop, martyr and holy father.
