= Ale Felege Selam =

Ethiopian painter and art educator (1923/24–2016)

- Born: Ale Felege Selam Heruy; 1923 or 1924; Fiche, Selale, Shewa province, Ethiopian Empire
- Died: July 11, 2016 (aged 91–92); Addis Ababa, Ethiopia
- Resting place: Debre Libanos
- Other names: Ato Ale; Ale Felegeselam; Alle Feleghe Selam
- Education: School of the Art Institute of Chicago (BFA, 1954)
- Occupations: Painter, muralist, art educator
- Known for: Founding director of the Addis Ababa Fine Arts School (now Ale School of Fine Arts and Design)
- Spouse: Aster Kiflezgi (m. 1957)
- Children: 2

Ale Felege Selam Heruy (Amharic: አለ ፈለገ ሰላም; 1923 or 1924 (Note: Sources differ on his year of birth. Addis Zeybe gives July 31, 1923; The Reporter and the International Journal of Ethiopian Studies give 1924; Nagy (2007) gives 1929.) – July 11, 2016) was an Ethiopian artist and teacher, best known as the founder of the Addis Ababa Fine Arts School, Ethiopia's first formal school of art. The son and grandson of church painters, he studied at the School of the Art Institute of Chicago on an imperial scholarship, graduating in 1954. Back home, he paid for the new school largely through sales of his pupils' work, and directed it from its opening in 1957/58 (Note: Because the Ethiopian calendar year begins in September, the school's founding is dated by some authors to 1957 and by others to 1958.) until the Derg forced him out after the 1974 revolution.

In later decades he worked on conserving religious art and painted murals in several Orthodox churches, among them Holy Trinity Cathedral in Addis Ababa and St. Mary's in Adama. The institution has carried his name, as the Ale School of Fine Arts and Design, since 2010.

== Early life and education ==
Ale came from Fiche in Selale, where his family had painted for churches over several generations; he learned drawing and painting on his own as a boy. His grandfather enjoyed the favor of Emperor Menelik II. Journalist Tesfalidet Bizuworq names this grandfather as Hiruy Woldegiorgis, credits him with murals at Entoto Kidane Mihret and Entoto Raguel, and notes that two of Hiruy's sons, Ale's father Felege Selam and his uncle Em'aelaf, also painted. Ale told the magazine Demakochu in 2008 that Italian occupation forces condemned him to death when he was a boy, following a brawl in which an Italian servant was killed, and that he got away before the sentence was carried out.

Ale later settled in Addis Ababa, where he finished the Addis Ababa Technical School with distinction and found work at a garage. Haile Selassie then awarded him a scholarship to study engineering in America, but he enrolled instead at the School of the Art Institute of Chicago, graduating with a Bachelor of Fine Arts in 1954. He stayed on in the United States for another year, earning money, and then toured European museums for three months, chiefly in France and Italy, before going home. (Note: Nagy gives the year of his return as 1945, evidently a misprint; Addis Zeybe gives 1955.)

== Career ==
=== Addis Ababa Fine Arts School ===
Ale took a post at the Ministry of Education and Fine Arts after he came back. In his spare time, he gave art lessons in his own house to pupils drawn from Addis Ababa's secondary schools. He sold their work at a series of exhibitions attended by diplomats and members of the imperial family, and handed the proceeds, 75,000 Ethiopian dollars, to the emperor to start a school. Haile Selassie agreed to fund the project, and the Addis Ababa Fine Arts School began operating in 1957/58, headed by Ale. Bizuworq dates its formal opening to July 23, 1958, Haile Selassie's 66th birthday.

Because no Ethiopians had yet been trained as art-school teachers, Ale turned to foreign embassies for staff. Early instructors included the Austrian sculptor Herbert Seiler, the German printmaker Hansen Bahia and the painter Vincenzo Fumo from Italy; the Ethiopian painter and calligrapher Yigazu Bisrat joined later. Ale brought to the school the drawing and painting pedagogy he had learned in Chicago. As Ethiopians who had studied overseas came home, he added them to the faculty: Gebre Kristos Desta arrived in 1962, Skunder Boghossian in 1966.

=== Derg era and later life ===
The Derg forced Ale from the directorship after it took power in 1974; in 1975 the teaching staff chose Abdurahman Sherif as his replacement. Ale moved into heritage conservation, spending five years with the heritage maintenance unit of the Ministry of Culture repairing church and monastery archives in remote areas, until disagreements with the government led him to quit.

In the early 1990s Ale moved to Adama (Nazareth). He devoted about eight years there to the murals of St. Mary's Church, covering its walls and dome, and in the same period resumed teaching at the Fine Arts School. In 2006 he went to the United States to paint Medhane Alem, an Ethiopian Orthodox church near Washington, D.C.

== Style and works ==
Nagy calls Ale an accomplished painter of landscapes and portraits. He worked in a realistic manner and drew on ancient Ethiopian religious imagery, merging it with modern methods. Besides the murals mentioned above, he decorated Kulubi Gabriel church near Harar and other churches in Addis Ababa. His output also included book illustrations, posters and designs for postage stamps. Exhibitions of his paintings were held in countries including Germany, Greece, India, the Soviet Union and the United States.

== Legacy ==
Nagy ranks the Addis Ababa Fine Arts School among the foremost art academies in Africa. It became part of Addis Ababa University in 2000, at which point it switched from awarding diplomas to awarding BFA degrees. In Nagy's account Ale belongs, with Agegnehu Engida and Afewerk Tekle, to the first wave of Ethiopian modernists, whereas the teachers he recruited, such as Gebre Kristos Desta and Skunder Boghossian, were the first to embrace abstraction and related modern styles fully.

Since 2010, the school has been named the Ale School of Fine Arts and Design. Bizuworq writes that Ale had wanted his complete name used. Its collection includes a 1999 portrait of him painted by Tadesse Mesfin, one of his former students, from a photograph taken while Ale was director.

== Personal life and death ==
In 1957, Ale wed Aster Kiflezgi, with whom he had one son and one daughter. Students and colleagues called him Ato Ale ("Mister Ale"). Outside painting, he was a keen fisherman and sportsman.

Ale died on July 11, 2016, in Addis Ababa. After a funeral service at Holy Trinity Cathedral he was laid to rest at Debre Libanos monastery. According to The Reporter, a daughter, a son, three grandchildren and a great-granddaughter survived him; Bizuworq, however, writes that the son died before his father.
