= Haile Mariam Mammo =

Ethiopian resistance leader (1904–1938)

- Born: 1904; Shewa, Ethiopia
- Died: 6 June 1938 (age 34); Gorfo, Bulga District
- Children: Zaude Hailemariam

Haile Mariam Mammo (Note: The name means Power of Mary, Son of Mammo.) (1904 – 6 June 1938), alternatively known as Lej Hayla Maryam Mammo, was an Ethiopian soldier and a leader of the Patriot movement (Arbegnoch) during the Italian occupation of Ethiopia. He fought in the Second Italo-Ethiopian War in 1936 before becoming a resistance leader in his native province of Shewa. He was mortally wounded in battle with the Italians.

== Biography ==
Haile Mariam Mammo was born in 1904 in the village of Ya-Ya Quecama, Selale district, Shewa, Ethiopia. He was educated at a traditional church school in his village before attending the Tafari Makonnen School in Addis Ababa. Haile Mariam worked as a farmer in adulthood. He later fathered a son, Zewdie.

Italy invaded Ethiopia in 1935, initiating the Second Italo-Ethiopian War. Haile Mariam was wounded on 31 March 1936 during the Battle of Maychew. After the Italian victory there, he withdrew to his native region and managed to recruit about 500 locals to his cause. He orchestrated an ambush on an Italian column that was advancing on the capital, Addis Ababa, on 4 May in Chacha, near Debre Berhan. In the ensuing battle, Haile Mariam's men killed approximately 170 Italian colonial troops and captured four Italians, two of whom were doctors. They were later released. Historian Salome Gebre Egziabher later said that by executing this attack, Haile Mariam had made himself "the first Patriot of Shewa". Nevertheless, Addis Ababa fell to the advancing Italians the next day. As Ethiopian military leaders withdrew, Haile Mariam conducted hit-and-run attacks around the city. He orchestrated resistance in Selale Muger, Debre Berhan, Menz, Tegulet, and Bulga, in northern Selale. Following the surrender of other Patriot leaders in July, Haile Mariam relocated to Tagulet.

Haile Mariam's activities caused great frustration among the Italians. General Ruggero Tracchia, commander of the Debre Berhan garrison, resorted to calling in reinforcements from surrounding areas to combat the resistance. Haile Mariam's men killed several hundred Italians and seized a substantial number of arms in several engagements. In June 1938 Italian forces encircled Ankober and the surrounding highlands in an attempt to pacify resistance in the region. Haile Mariam was the only Patriot leader who decided to try and effect a breakout and with 500 men he assaulted the Italians in a futile attempt to breach their cordon. He was mortally wounded on 6 June during a major clash at Gorfo, Bulga district.

== Legacy ==
Haile Mariam was respected by his subordinates and other Patriot commanders for his leadership and courage. Following the liberation of Ethiopia in 1941, a school in Debre Berhan and a hospital in Adama were built in his memory. A street in Addis Ababa was also named after him. In 1956/1957 Te'ezagu Haylu wrote an eponymous 13-act play about him.
