= Tsehaiwork Darge =

Ethiopian noble member in 19th century

Woizero Tsehaiwork Darge, also spelt Tsehaywork or Sähaywärq, was the daughter of Ras Darge Sahle Selassie, and the granddaughter of Sahle Selassie, King of Shewa from 1813 to 1847. In her life she had 8 siblings, and of note are her sisters Tisseme Darge, mother of Kassa Haile Darge, Askalä, and her brothers Lej Gugsa Darge, Dajjazmač Täsämma, and Däjjazmac Asfaw.

Tsehaiwork's family was favoured by her first cousin, Emperor Menelik II, and his wife, Taytu Betul.

Although she never formally married, she independently managed her vast land holdings and was reputed to have had a male "favourite." Known as a formidable and headstrong woman, she was greatly feared as a taskmaster by the domestic staff in both her father's household and the Imperial Palace.

She was known to be deft in 'handicrafts' and active in politics, and was a friend of Lij Iyasu, but in 1926 was accused of conspiracy against Haile Selassie, who was named heir to Zewditu, whom Iyasu was deposed by. She was imprisoned as a nun at Debre Libanos and died in December 1928.
