= Belay Zeleke =

Ethiopian military commander (1912–1945)

- በላይ ዘለቀ
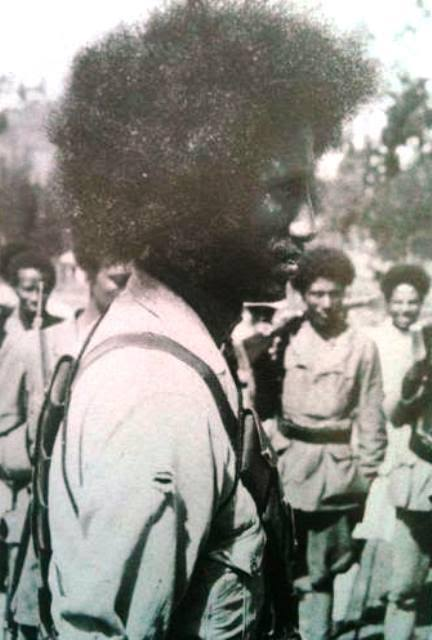

Governor of Bichena
- In office 1941–1942

Personal details
- Born: 1909 Bichena, Gojjam Province, Ethiopian Empire
- Died: 12 January 1945 (aged 35–36) Addis Ababa, Ethiopian Empire
- Cause of death: Execution by hanging

Military service
- Allegiance: Ethiopian Empire
- Years of service: 1935–1941
- Unit: Arbegnoch
- Battles/wars: Second Italo-Ethiopian War; World War II

Belay Zeleke (Amharic: በላይ ዘለቀ, horse name Abba Koster; 1909 – 12 January 1945) was an Ethiopian military commander who led the Arbegnoch resistance movement in Gojjam against the Fascist Italians during the Italian occupation of Ethiopia from 1936 to 1941. He emerged as a brigand leader after his five-year struggle against Italian rule in Ethiopia.

== Early life ==
Belay Zeleke was born in 1909 in Bechena, Gojjam. His father, Zeleke Lakew, was a native of Lamcan in Gojjam and his mother, Taytu Asna, was a native of Sayint in Wollo. Belay's father was a loyal and close servant of Lij Iyasu, who bestowed him the title of Basha, and is said to have had a considerable number of troops under his command. After the fall of Lij Iyasu, Basha Zeleke first moved to his wife’s residence, in Caqqäta, and later to Lamchan in Gojjam, and then submitted to Ras Hailu Tekle Haymanot.

After a while, Zeleke killed a man and refused to submit peacefully to the local governor, Fitawrari Embiyala, the governor of Bichena. In 1924, Fitawrari Embiyala marched to Lamcan to arrest Zeleke. In the skirmish that followed, Zeleke was killed in Kanto Maryam, and at Bokena his body was hung on a tree for a day in order to intimidate the locals. After the death of his father, Belay became a well known shifta (bandit) and was joined by some male members of his family. In 1935, Belay commanded a significant army of brigands that harassed the local authorities in the lowlands around the bank of the Abay River.

== Resistance against the Italians ==
After the Italians occupied Ethiopia in 1936, Belay turned his attention against the Italian authorities and began organizing resistance against Italian rule in the Gojjam area. He first emerged in Italian sources on 4 August 1937, when his forces ambushed an Italian column led by Captain De Beaumont near Debre Markos, causing 31 deaths and 27 injuries. Later that month, the official publication of Italian East Africa, Gli Annali dell'Africa Italiana (The Annals of Italian Africa), reported that "rebel bands" had increased in number and became more "menacing" during the rainy season. The report identified the most active groups were the ones in Gojjam led by Mengesha Jembere and Belay Zeleke. News of this revolt caused Marshal Rodolfo Graziani to return to Addis Ababa in September, as he was urged by Minister Alessandro Lessona to crush the rebels by "every means", noting that "the situation, especially in Gojjam, was becoming graver."

After the relatively easy suppression of Hailu Kebede's revolt in Wag and Lasta in late September 1937, Grazani was dismissed as Viceroy on 26 December 1937 and replaced by Prince Amedeo, Duke of Aosta, who immediately made plans to crush the rebellion in Gojjam. The offensive began on 19 January 1938, when four battalions of Eritrean Ascaris and several units of irregular bands under General Ugo Cavallero launched attacks on the guerrillas of Mengesha and Belay. The Italians lost 350 dead and 1,200 wounded, the majority of whom were askaris but also included Italian officers such as Giovanni Thun Hohenstein, Nicola Tagliaferri and Oreste Bernardini. Despite these heavy losses, these clashes ended in March 1938 with the dispersal of the guerrillas, and 2,300 confirmed killed according to Italian sources.

Belay, who now became the most powerful guerrilla leader in Italian East Africa, spent the rainy season of 1938 replenishing his losses and then resuming his struggle against the Italians by the spring of 1939. On July 1939, the Italians launched an offensive against the brigands of Belay, largely aimed at punishing the locals for their support of the resistance. Between 25 and 30 villages were set on fire and 85 punishment measures against civilians were carried out, however this operation inflicted minimal damage on Belay's forces. The next month, Belay would launch his most notable attack on the Italians, when his forces attacked 327 bandas and 6 Italian officers of the 70th Colonial Brigade in Debre Werq on August 7. This resulted in the deaths of hundreds of bandas and three Italian officers, including their commander, Colonel Sergio Cocchini. According to Ethiopian oral tradition, as Belay's war activities intensified, many began to address him as Leul Belay and Atse Begulbetu. Belay bestowed upon his followers the traditional titles, such as Qenyazmach, Dejazmach, Fitawrari, and Ras. When his brother, Dejazmach Ejigu, asked him "what title is left for you, as you have given all to your followers?", he replied: "I need no title as my mother had already called me Belay".

On 5 April 1941, the British Gideon Force led by General Orde Wingate captured Debre Marqos from the III Colonial Brigade led by Colonel Saverio Maraventano, who then fled to Shoa. The British tried to get Belay's forces to ambush Maraventano's column before they crossed the Blue Nile, but they managed to escape unharmed. The former Italian collaborator that had switched sides, Ras Hailu Tekle Haymanot, then had a confrontation with Belay, which forced the British to intervene. As Haile Selassie I returned from his exile through Debre Markos on 6 April 1941, Belay reportedly had 5,000–7,000 combatants, who presented themselves in a military parade in front of the emperor, singing war songs and heroic recitals. Haile Selassie was impressed and rewarded Belay with 12,000 Thalers, and then invited him for a private talk.

== Rebellion ==
After the liberation, the history of Belay Zeleke was dramatic. He was appointed the governor of Bichena, his home province, with the title of Dejazmach. He attempted to fill subordinate positions with his former comrades, but his superiors insisted on appointing judges and other officials themselves. When Belay refused to accept these appointments, senior officials in Gojjam reported to the Emperor that he was rebelling against the imperial government. He ignored the order even after Haile Selassie summoned the disputing parties to Addis Ababa. In 1942, the Emperor then sent an army to arrest him, but Belay resisted from a stronghold on Mount Somma. After suffering heavy losses, the Emperor sent a delegation promising him a pardon if he surrendered; however, once he did, he was tried by a special commission and sentenced to death.

=== Death ===
Belay's death penalty was confirmed by the Emperor, but changed later to life imprisonment. After a few years in prison he made an escape attempt under pressure from Lij Mammo Haile Mikael, an Italian collaborator who was imprisoned in the compound of the Grand Palace with him. They were re-arrested and brought to royal court. Belay was arrested and executed by hanging in Teklehaymanot Square in Addis Ababa along with his brother Ejigu and other rebels on 12 January 1945. He was 35 when he died; survived by four wives, three daughters (Yerome, Yasawerq and Yashembet) and four sons (Admasu, Gossu, Bahru and Melaku).

== Legacy ==
Dejazmach Belay Zeleke is considered by Ethiopians as a hero. In order to acquiesce the province, after Belay's hanging, the imperial government changed the taxation policy in Gojjam to the pre-war system. The major road and school in Addis Ababa who are named after him are Dejazmach Belay Zeleke Street and Dejazmach Belay Zeleke Secondary School. There is also Belay Zeleke Road in Bahir Dar. Bahir Dar Airport is also renamed Bahir Dar Dejazmach Belay Zeleke Airport after him.
