= First battle of Tembien =

1936 battle of the Second Italo-Ethiopian War

- Part of the Second Italo-Ethiopian War
Date	20–24 January 1936
Location	Tembien Province, Ethiopia
Result	Inconclusive

Belligerents
Italy	Ethiopia

Commanders and leaders
Pietro Badoglio	Ras Kassa; Ras Seyoum

Strength
70,000; 300 field guns 14,000 draft animals	70,000

Casualties and losses
1,083 killed	5,000 killed

The first battle of Tembien was fought on the northern front of what was known as the Second Italo-Ethiopian War. This battle consisted of attacks and counterattacks by Italian forces under Marshal Pietro Badoglio and Ethiopian forces under Ras (Note: Roughly equivalent to Duke.) Kassa Haile Darge. This battle was primarily fought around Worsege Pass (Italian: Passo Uarieu also translated as the Warieu Pass) in what was then the Tembien Province of Ethiopia.

== Background ==
In early January 1936, the Ethiopian forces were in the hills everywhere overlooking the Italian positions and attacking them regularly. Italian dictator Benito Mussolini was impatient for an Italian offensive to get under way and for the Ethiopians to be swept from the field. In response to his frequent exhortations, Badoglio cabled Mussolini: "It has always been my rule to be meticulous in preparation so that I may be swift in action."

The Ethiopians facing the Italians were in three groupings. In the center, near Abiy Addi and along the Beles River in the Tembien, were Ras Kassa with approximately 40,000 men and Ras Seyum Mangasha with about 30,000 men. On the Ethiopian right was Ras Mulugeta Yeggazu and his army of approximately 80,000 men in positions atop Amba Aradam. Ras Imru Haile Selassie with approximately 40,000 men was on the Ethiopian left in the area around Seleh Leha in the Shire Province.

Badoglio had five army corps at his disposal. On his right, he had the Italian IV Corps and the Italian II Corps facing Ras Imru in the Shire. In the Italian center was the Eritrean Corps facing Ras Kassa and Ras Seyoum in the Tembien. Facing Ras Mulugeta atop Amba Aradam was the Italian I Corps and the Italian III Corps.

Initially, Badoglio saw the destruction of Ras Mulugeta's army as his first priority. Mulugeta's force would have to be dislodged from its strong positions on Amba Aradam in order for the Italians to continue the advance towards Addis Ababa. But Ras Kassa and Ras Seyoum were exerting such pressure from the Tembien that Badoglio decided that he would have to deal with them first. If the Ethiopian center was successful, the I Corps and III Corps facing Ras Mulugeta would be cut off from reinforcement and resupply.

On 19 January, the day before the offensive in the Tembien began, Badoglio ordered General Ettore Bastico, commander of the III Corps, to leave Makale and occupy Nebri and Negada. By doing this, Badoglio effectively closed the road to the Tembian to Ras Mulugeta, preventing him from sending reinforcements to Ras Kassa and Ras Seyoum.

== Battle ==
On 20 January, Badoglio launched the first battle of the Tembien. On the left of the Eritrean Corps, the 2nd Eritrean Division advanced in two columns through the area around Ab'aro Pass. On the right of the Eritrean Corps, the 2nd CC.NN. Division "28 Ottobre" advanced towards the torrent that was the Beles River. The Italian III Corps held Nebri and Negada. Badoglio attacked in Tembien: from the Abarò pass, on the left, some battalions of Vaccarisi's 2nd Eritrean Division detached themselves and, divided into two columns under the command of General Renzo Dalmazzo and Colonel Ruggero Tracchia, had as their objective the occupation of the region between Melfa and Quarar; a smaller column in the centre was directed towards Abba Salamà, while on the right a sortie from the Uarieu pass towards the Beles valley was planned to engage the Abyssinian troops. This column however, according to the orders that Badoglio gave to Alessandro Pirzio Biroli, was to carry out a simply demonstrative action without detaching itself too far from the pass and without running the risk of being attacked.

General Filippo Diamanti then led a column of roughly 1,500 soldiers to the Daran area, where the Ethiopians managed to attack the heavily outnumbered Italians. General Diamanti's men, surrounded by forces 10 times superior, began the retreat towards the pass leaving on the field more than 260 dead among which also included Father Reginaldo Giuliani, who would become a martyr of Fascism. The XII Indigenous Battalion intervened to save the survivors and retreat again to Passo Uarieu defended by the forces of the 2nd CC.NN. Division "28 Ottobre" of General Umberto Somma. By the end of the day, the 2nd Eritrean Division fell back to positions around Ab'aro Pass and the 180th Legion CC.NN. "Alessandro Farnese" of the 2nd CC.NN. Division on the Italian right was surrounded and besieged at the Worsege Pass alongside remains of the Diamanti Group. For three days the Ethiopians, who had a substantial numerical superiority, besieged the Italians at Worsege Pass, who were low on water and ammunition.

Badoglio moved up the 1st Eritrean Division to join the 2nd Eritrean Division at Ab'aro Pass. Badoglio then ordered the commander of the 2nd Eritrean Division, General Achille Vaccarisi, to advance on the Worsege Pass and relieve the besieged Italians there. By the afternoon of 22 January, the CC.NN. division and the garrison at Worsege Pass were still cut off and low on water and ammunition, the fury of the Ethiopian attacks was reaching a crescendo, and Badoglio drew up plans for a withdrawal to new defensive lines. There is no way to know what the result would have been if he had attempted to withdraw 70,000 men, 14,000 animals, and 300 guns of the Italian I Corps and III Corps down the single road from Mekelle with the forces of Ras Mulugeta at their rear.

However the Italian troops at the Worsege pass stubbornly repulsed every Ethiopian attack and on the third day, the Italian Royal Air Force (Regia Aeronautica Italiana) saved the day for Badoglio. The Ethiopians could no longer stand up to the deadly clouds of mustard gas rained down non-stop on the roads the troops took, the base camps where they gathered, and any area surrounding them. On the 24th, around midday, the relief columns of the 2nd Eritrean Division reached the positions held by the legionaries of the 28th October Legion, thus breaking the siege and finally supplying the besieged with water, food and ammunition. At the end of the battle the Italian dead were 60 officers, 605 CC.NN. and 417 Ascari.

== Aftermath ==
By the morning of 24 January, the first battle of Tembien came to an end. While the armies of Ras Kassa and Ras Seyoum had retreated from the area around Worsege Pass, they were not destroyed and they still held the Tembien. In addition, the armies of Ras Imru and Ras Mulugeta were fully intact. However, the threat the armies of the Ethiopian center posed to the I Corps and III Corps was neutralised and now Badoglio was free to turn his attention to the Ethiopian right and Ras Mulugeta. Badoglio considered the battle a success, the Ethiopian offensive had been prevented, their armies had lost considerable difficult to replace ammunition and had suffered many casualties. After the battle the military initiative was always in the hands of the Italians. Giuseppe Bottai wrote in his diary: "The action is over. Or rather, it failed. The heroic conduct of the Diamanti Group on October 28th, our determined advance on these positions, and our sweep of the Calaminò-Ghevà junction, along with the enemy's increased losses (over 5,000 dead), are not enough to convert a failed action into a victory. The enemy has not won; we have not won. We are exhausted by the status quo ."

Roughly one month later, the second battle of Tembien would prove to be a more decisive encounter between Ras Kassa and Ras Seyoum armies and the Italian army.

== See also ==
- Ethiopian Order of Battle Second Italo-Abyssinian War
- Army of the Ethiopian Empire
- List of Second Italo-Ethiopian War weapons of Ethiopia
- Italian Order of Battle Second Italo-Abyssinian War
- Royal Italian Army
- List of Italian military equipment in the Second Italo-Ethiopian War

== Notes ==
Footnotes

Citations
