= Tisseme Darge =

Relative of Emperor Menelik II and Darge Sahle Selassie of Ethiopia

Tesseme Darge was the daughter of Ras Darge Sahle Selassie, prince of Selale. She was a cousin to Emperor Menelik II. She married Wagshum Hailu, chief of Lasta, in 1868. They had a son in 1881, Kassa Haile Darge. She later divorced and married Welde Tsadiq.
