= Hailu Tekle Haymanot =

Ethiopian army commander (1868–1960)

Hailu Tekle Haymanot (1868–1950), also named Hailu II of Gojjam, was a member of the nobility of the Ethiopian Empire. He represented a provincial ruling elite who were often at odds with the Ethiopian central government. Hailu Tekle Haymanot was an independent-minded potentate who, throughout his life, was mistrustful of and mistrusted by the Emperor.

== Biography ==
Leul (Note: Roughly equivalent to Prince.) Hailu Tekle Haymanot was the son of Negus (Note: Roughly equivalent to King.) Tekle Haymanot Tessemma of Gojjam Province. Gojjam had long been a vassal kingdom within the Ethiopian Empire. The title "King of Gojjam" was an honorific title. The last time a King of Gojjam was elevated to Emperor was during the "Era of the Princes" (Zemene Mesafint). Hailu Tekle Haymanot was never elevated to Negus and never became King of Gojjam himself.

=== Shum of Gojjam ===
On 10 January 1901, at the death of Negus Tekle Haymanot Tessemma, three of his sons fought over who would succeed him as ruler of his province. However, instead of any of them succeeding him, Nəgusä Nägäst (Note: Usually translated as King of Kings or Emperor.) Menelik II partitioned the province into three parts and appointed his own governors over each part. Menelik thus effectively removed the sons of Tekle Haymanot from power in Gojjam.

Around 1906, Menelik became incapacitated and Itege (Note: Equivalent to Empress Consort.) Taytu Betul became the de facto power behind the throne. In 1907, Tekle Haymanot successfully used the influence of Taytu Betul to be appointed Shum (Note: Equivalent to Governor.) of Gojjam. In 1908, Menelik's grandson and heir, Lij (Note: Roughly equivalent to Child.) Iyasu married Sabla Wangel Hailu, Hailu's daughter, and Iyasu became Hailu's son-in-law. In 1913, Nəgusä Nägäst Menelik died and Iyasu should have succeeded him. However, the leading nobles of Ethiopia did not feel Iyasu was ready and his coronation was delayed. While sometimes referred to as "Emperor Iyasu V," Iyasu was never formally crowned Nəgusä Nägäst.

In 1916, Iyasu was deposed after forces loyal to him were defeated in the Battle of Segale. Iyasu was replaced by Menelik's daughter, Leult (Note: Roughly equivalent to Princess.) Zewditu. Zewditu was proclaimed Nigiste Negest (Note: Equivalent to Queen of Kings or Empress Regnant.) and her cousin Ras (Note: Roughly equivalent to Duke.) Tafari Makonnen was named Crown Prince and Enderase (Note: Equivalent to Regent.). After losing the throne Iyasu and a small band of followers roamed the Afar Depression for five years. On 11 January 1921, he was captured and taken into custody by Ras Gugsa Araya Selassie of eastern Tigray Province, who handed Iyasu over to Ras Kassa Haile Darge of Shewa Province.

In his book Ethiopia, Power and Protest: Peasant Revolts in the Twentieth Century, Gebru Tareke described Shum Hailu of Gojjam as "[having] an avaricious taste for power and wealth." Tareke goes on to describe how Ras Hailu "introduced new forms of taxation, auctioned political and church offices, nearly monopolized provincial trade by controlling the export side of it, transacted obligatory labor into monetary rents, and, though little is known about them, enlarged his estates with a manifest arrogant disregard for the customary judicial process of land allocation." These actions earned him the nickname birru (or "dollars") Hailu.

=== Trip to Europe ===
In the spring of 1924, Ras Hailu accompanied Ras Tafari Makonnen on his European tour. Within eight years, Tafari Makonnen would be crowned Nəgusä Nägäst Haile Selassie I. Along with Ras Hailu and Ras Tafari Makonnen on the tour were Ras Seyum Mangasha of western Tigre Province, Ras Mulugeta Yeggazu of Illubabor Province, Ras Makonnen Endelkachew, and Blattengeta (Note: Roughly equivalent to Lord of the Pages or Chief Administrator of the Palace.) Heruy Welde Sellase. Hailu, Seyum Mangasha, and Tafari Makonnen were sons of men who fought at the Battle of Adwa, while Mulugeta Yeggazu had fought in the battle as a young man. Ras Tafari and his party visited Jerusalem, Cairo, Alexandria, Brussels, Amsterdam, Stockholm, London, Geneva, and Athens. They took six lions with them, which were presented to a French zoo and to dignitaries in the United Kingdom and France.

Among several anecdotes from the trip Europe, is one directly involving Ras Hailu. At the time, he was the governor of an important province and one of the wealthiest men in the Ethiopian Empire and carried himself as such. The Crown Prince, Ras Tafari Makonnen, and his entourage were being received by King George V and Queen Mary at Buckingham Palace. Ras Hailu Tekle Haymanot, along with the other princes and nobles, was introduced to the British king. In meeting Ras Hailu, King George asked if His Highness could speak English. The interpreter said no. The king then asked if he could speak French or German, again the answer was no. King George, rather irritated, told the interpreter to tell His Highness that he was an ignorant man. Ras Hailu listened quietly. He then asked the interpreter if His Majesty could speak Amharic. When he was told no, Hailu asked him if His Majesty could speak Tigrigna or Guragigna and again was told no. Hailu then haughtily told the interpreter to tell the king that His Majesty was equally ignorant. King George burst out laughing and took a great liking to Ras Hailu, Leul of Gojjam. Ethiopia was said to be opening up to the world.

In the same year as the trip with Tafari Makonnen, Hailu was awarded an honorary British knighthood (KBE). In 1926, after having seen the palaces of Europe, Ras Hailu began to remodel the palace his father built at Debre Marqos in the image of what he had seen in Europe.

On 27 October 1928, Tafari Makonnen was proclaimed Negus by Nigiste Negest Zewditu. Tafari Makonnen became the last Negus of the Ethiopian Empire. Even after he was later proclaimed Nəgusä Nägäst, Tafari Makonnen never elevated others, like Hailu, to the position of Negus.

=== Downfall ===
Sometime in 1929, Ras Hailu was approached by Ras Gugsa Welle of Begemder Province. He was Zewditu's husband who was separated from her from the time she was elevated to Nigiste Negest. Gugsa Welle asked Hailu to support his uprising against the recently crowned Negus Tafari Makonnen. After initially indicating his interest in supporting Gugsa Welle, Hailu decided against joining him. Still, his response was lukewarm when Negus Tafari Makonnen called a chitet, the traditional mustering of the provincial levies. (Note: A chitet is the traditional mustering of the provincial levies.) Ras Hailu Tekle Haymanot only raised about two-thousand levies in Gojjam. On 31 March 1930, the uprising ended at the Battle of Anchem when Gugsa Welle was killed in action. Nigiste Negest Zewditu died a few days later of natural causes. On 2 November 1930, Tafari Makonnen was proclaimed as Nəgusä Nägäst Haile Selassie I.

With the accession of Haile Selassie, Hailu's avarice led to his own downfall. According to Harold Marcus, while the other great lords of Ethiopia like Ras Seyum Mangasha and Ras Kassa Haile Darge had surrendered their rights to custom duties and tax revenues in their provinces, Hailu tightly held on to his revenues. Marcus continues, "Hailu also embarrassed the crown by openly seeking favors from the American and British legations, insinuating that otherwise he would block their access to Lake Tana and the Blue Nile." The central government had little trouble finding complainants against Ras Hailu; compelled to appear at Haile Selassie's coronation, or risk insulting him, Hailu came to the capital where he and his son were detained while charges were made against him. Ras Hailu managed to extract himself from the capital after a time, only to find his government in Gojjam in tatters. On 14 April 1932, Hailu was summoned once again to Addis Ababa to face new charges. Hailu was fined heavily, had half of his property taken away, and placed under house arrest.

==== Plot to free Lij Iyasu and imprisonment ====
In May 1932, Ras Hailu involved himself in a plot to free his son-in-law, the deposed Lij Iyasu. Iyasu had been under house arrest and in the custody of Ras Kassa Haile Darge since 1921. After freeing Iyasu, Hailu planned to re-capture him and to turn him back in to gain favor with Haile Selassie. Lij Iyasu did escape, but the role Ras Hailu played in his escape became known and Hailu was taken into custody himself and deposed. A tribunal found Hailu guilty of mendacity, corruption, tax evasion, and treason. Ras Hailu went from a comfortable house arrest to imprisonment. He was replaced as Shum of Gojjam by Ras Imru Haile Selassie, a loyal cousin of the Nəgusä Nägäst.

=== Hailu during and after the occupation ===
On 2 May 1936, at the very end of the Second Italo-Ethiopian War, Hailu was still considered enough of a threat that, on his way into exile, Haile Selassie had him removed from prison, bound, and loaded onto his train leaving Addis Ababa. Haile Selassie must have reconsidered and Hailu was released at Dire Dawa with fellow prisoner Ras Balcha Safo. But, while Balcha Safo went into the hills to fight against Italian occupation, Hailu Tekle Haymanot boarded a train back to Addis Ababa and approached the Italian invaders in submission.

During the occupation, Hailu was treated with respect and given honors few other Ethiopian nobles received from the Italians. He retained his pre-occupation titles of Leul and Ras, and the Italian government awarded him the Star of Italy and the Order of Saints Maurice and Lazarus, and restored his lands which had been confiscated from him in 1935. Graziani himself exempted him and his family from the repercussions of Yekatit 12. which led to the deaths or imprisonment of many respectable Ethiopians. The Italians dangled the title of Negus in front of Hailu but never actually granted it to him. The Italian Intelligence Service reported in 1939 that once he was granted that title, Hailu planned to provoke an uprising, drive out the Italians, and assume control of Ethiopia for himself.

In July 1936, a number of surviving Ethiopian soldiers staged an unsuccessful attack on Addis Ababa to wrest control of the capital from the Italian occupiers. Ras Hailu played a part in the surrender of two of the commanders of the attacking forces. Both commanders were sons of Ras Kassa Haile Darge, Aberra Kassa and Asfawossen Kassa. Along with others, both had taken part in the attack and, like most, they attempted to escape capture after the attack failed. Hailu assured Aberra and Asfawossen that, if they surrendered, they would not be harmed. On 21 December, both Aberra and Asfawossen turned themselves in at Fiche. However, once in Italian captivity, they were both executed as rebels. (Note: Mockler indicates that Ras Hailu had been deceived into helping the Italians in these killings.)

By 27 September 1939, during the Feast of Maskal in Addis Ababa, Ras Hailu, Ras Seyum Mangasha, and Ras Haile Selassie Gugsa sat with Amedeo, 3rd Duke of Aosta, the Viceroy and Governor General of Italian East Africa (Africa Orientale Italiana, or AOI). All three Ethiopian leaders had submitted to Italian control of what had been their homeland and what was now the AOI colony. The Italians eventually returned Hailu to power in Gojjam at the very final stage of their occupation and as their rule began to collapse under the onslaught of British, Commonwealth, and exiled Ethiopian forces.

In 1941, after Emperor Haile Selassie returned to power in Ethiopia, Ras Hailu Tekle Haymanot again switched sides and handed Gojjam over to the Emperor. However, he first made sure that Italian forces had safely evacuated Gojjam. Hailu returned to Addis Ababa with Haile Selassie. He was forbidden from leaving Addis Ababa, but was accorded all the dignities of a senior prince of the Imperial dynasty and head of the House of Gojjam. In the words of Gebru Tareke, he "languished in well-merited obscurity until his death in 1950," which "put the final nail in the coffin of the provincial ruling elite, who had been grudgingly yielding ground to the centralists since the closing decade of the nineteenth century."

His funeral was attended by the Emperor and his family and he was accorded a state funeral.

=== Family ===
The continued incapacitation of Nəgusä Nägäst Menelik allowed Hailu to better his position by marrying Woizero (Note: Usually translated as Dame.) Assalafetch Wolde Hanna in 1909. Assalafetch Wolde Hanna was a cousin of Itege Taytu Betul and, on 12 April, Assalafetch and Hailu were wed. It was her third marriage and his second. They had no children together and the marriage ended in divorce.

Hailu Tekle Haymanot had eight (non-simultaneous) wives and numerous children. His sons included Mammo Hailu, Alemu Hailu and Alam Seged Hailu, and his daughters included Sabla Wangel Hailu.

== See also ==
- Ethiopian aristocratic and court titles
- List of field marshals
- List of honorary British Knights
- Ethiopian coup d'état of 1928
