= Gojjam =

Former province in northwestern Ethiopia

Coordinates: 11°00′N 37°00′E

Location of Gojjam within the Ethiopian Empire

Gojjam (Amharic: ጎጃም gōjjām, originally ጐዛም gʷazzam, later ጐዣም gʷažžām, ጎዣም gōžžām) is a historical provincial kingdom in northwestern Amhara region of Ethiopia, with its capital city at Debre Markos. 99.2% of the Gojjam residents are part of the Amhara people, whilst a small percentage of other ethnicities makes up the rest.

During the 18th century, Gojjam's western neighbors were Agawmeder in the southwest and Qwara in the northwest. Agawmeder, never an organized political entity, was gradually absorbed by Gojjam until it reached west to the Sultanate of Gubba; Juan Maria Schuver noted in his journeys in Agawmeder (September 1882) that in three prior months, "the Abyssinians considerably advanced their frontier towards the West, effacing what was left of the independent regions." Gubba acknowledged its dependence to Emperor Menelik II in 1898, but by 1942 was absorbed into Gojjam. Dek Island in Lake Tana was administratively part of Gojjam until 1987. The capital city is Bahir Dar.

== History ==
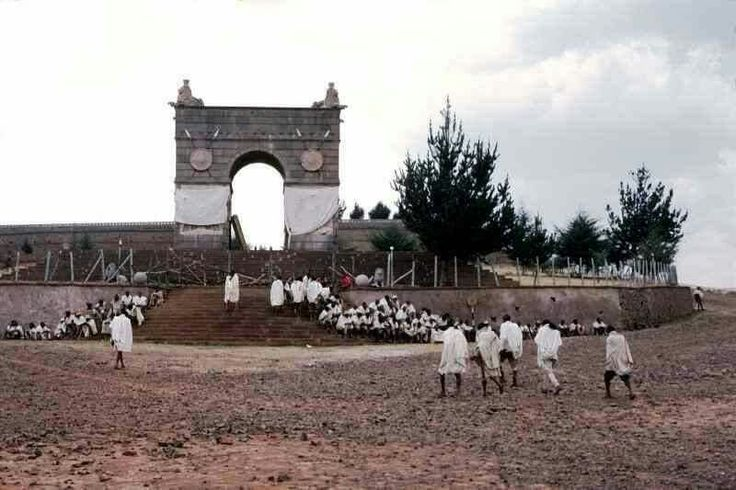
The arch of Negus Tekle Haymanot of Gojjam in Debre Markos

The earliest recorded mention of Gojjam was during the medieval period, in a note in a manuscript of Amda Seyon's military campaigns there and in Damot in 1309 EC (1316/7 CE), during which time it was incorporated into Ethiopia. According to "The Glorious Victories," the soldiers of Amda Seyon were from "Amhara and Sewä and Gojjam and Dämot, (men) who were trained in warfare, and dressed in gold and silver and fine clothes archers, spearmen, cavalry, and infantry with strong legs, trained for war. When they go to war they fight like eagles and run like wild goats; the (movement) of their feet is like the rolling of stones, and their sound is like the roaring of the sea, as says the prophet Herege'el: "I have heard the sound of the wings of the angels, as the noise of a camp." Such were the soldiers of 'Amda Seyon, full of confidence in war." It was also referenced on the Egyptus Novello map, (c. 1451), where it is described as a kingdom (though it had by this time long been subject to the Emperor of Ethiopia). Emperor Dawit II, in his letter to the King of Portugal (1526), also described Gojjam as a kingdom but one that was part of his empire.

According to the sixteenth century Adalite chronicle Futuh al-Habasha, Gojjam was captured by Adal following the Battle of Zari.

At least as early as Empress Eleni, Gojjam provided the revenues of the Empress until the Zemene Mesafint ("Era of the Judges"), when central authority was weak and the revenues were appropriated by Fasil of Damot. Gojjam then became a power base for a series of warlords at least as late as Ras Hailu Tekle Haymanot, who was deposed in 1932.

During the Italian occupation, Gojjam came to be the home of armed bands who resisted the Italian occupiers, whose leaders included Belay Zelleke, Mengesha Jemberie, Negash Bezabih and Hailu Belew. These resistance fighters, known as arbegnoch (or "Patriots"), limited the Italians to only the immediate areas around heavily fortified towns like Debre Markos. Belay Zelleke was even able to fully liberate and run civil administrations in the eastern part of Gojjam and some adjacent woredas in South Wollo and North Shoa. Since the Italians were unable to bring Gojjam under their control, the province was finally chosen by Emperor Haile Selassie as the safest way to return to Ethiopia. During his return, he was supported by the combined forces of the British army, Gojjamie Patriots, and other Ethiopians living abroad before then in fear of persecution by Italians. During the reign of Emperor Haile Selassie, however, the inhabitants of Gojjam rebelled several times due to resentment over ill-treatment of patriots and increased taxes, the latest occasion in 1968—about the same time as the Bale revolt. Unlike in Bale, the central government did not use a military solution to end the revolt, instead replacing the governors and reversing the attempt to levy new taxes; in response to the 1968 revolt, the central government went as far as waiving tax arrears back to 1950.

With the adoption of a new constitution in 1995, Gojjam was divided, with the westernmost part forming the majority of the Metekel Zone of the Benishangul-Gumuz Region, and the rest becoming the Agew Awi, the West Gojjam and the East Gojjam Zones of the Amhara Region.

Notable persons

== See also ==
- Monarchies of Ethiopia
- History of Ethiopia
