= Aberra Kassa =

Ethiopian army commander (1905–1936)

Dejazmach Aberra Kassa
- Born: 1905
- Died: 21 December 1936 (aged 30–31); Fikke
- Spouse: Kebedech Seyoum
- Relatives: Kassa Haile Darge (father); Asfawossen Kassa (brother); Wondosson Kassa (brother); Asrate Kassa (brother)
- Military career
- Allegiance: Ethiopia
- Branch: Ethiopian Army; Arbegnoch
- Rank: Commander
- Conflicts: Second Italo-Ethiopian War

Aberra Kassa (Amharic: አበራ ካሣ; 1905 – 21 December 1936) was an army commander and a member of the Royal family of the Ethiopian Empire.

== Biography ==
Leul Dejazmach ("Prince of the Cadet line") Aberra Kassa was the second son of Ras ("Duke") Kassa Haile Darge. Kassa Haile Darge was a loyal ally of Negus Tafari Makonnen, who ultimately was crowned Emperor Haile Selassie I of Ethiopia. Leul Dejazmach Aberra Kassa was married to Woizero Kebedech Seyoum, the daughter of Leul Ras Seyum Mangasha.

During the Second Italo-Ethiopian War, Aberra Kassa fought for his father. At the Second Battle of Tembien, the armies of his father and Seyum Mangasha were defeated in battle and bombed out of existence as they withdrew.

During the early days of the Italian occupation of Ethiopia, Aberra Kassa was part of the armed Ethiopian resistance. Following the flight of Emperor Haile Selassie, the sons of Ras Kassa became the royal focus of the resistance. Late in July 1936, he took part in the ill-fated attack on Addis Ababa along with his brothers, Wondosson Kassa and Asfawossen Kassa. After the failure of that attack, he and Asfawossen Kassa fled together to avoid capture.

On 21 December 1936, Aberra Kassa and Asfawossen Kassa surrendered. They had been assured by Ras Hailu Tekle Haymanot that they would not be harmed. Hailu Tekle Haymanot was speaking on behalf of the Italian Viceroy and Governor-General of Ethiopia, Rodolfo Graziani. Hailu Tekle Haymanot was the father-in-law of Asfawossen. Aberra Kassa was also given assurances by his own father-in-law, Seyum Mangasha. However, once in captivity, the bodyguards of the brothers were disarmed and they were executed by the Italians as rebels in the market square in Fikke.

Upon hearing of the murder of her husband, Aberra Kassa's widow Kebbedech Seyum rose from her childbed and led the remnants of her husband's forces in battle. After clashing with Italian forces fourteen times, the young widow and her small children crossed over the border into the Sudan with what was left of her husband's forces. Following the liberation of Ethiopia in 1941, Woizero Kebbedech Seyum was given the rank of Woizero-hoy and recognized as among the foremost resistance leaders of the occupation in her own right.

== See also ==
- Monarchies of Ethiopia
- Ethiopian aristocratic and court titles

== Sources ==
- Mockler, Anthony (2002). Haile Sellassie's War. New York: Olive Branch Press. ISBN 978-1-56656-473-1.
