= Wondosson Kassa =

Ethiopian army commander (1903–1936)

Wondosson Kassa, also known as Wond Wossen Kassa (1903 – 19 December 1936), was a member of the royalty of the Ethiopian Empire, an army commander, and a patriot.

== Biography ==
Leul (Note: Roughly equivalent to Prince.) Wondosson Kassa was the eldest son of Ras (Note: Roughly equivalent to Duke.) Kassa Haile Darge. Ras Kassa was a loyal ally of Negus (Note: Roughly equivalent to King.) Tafari Makonnen, who ultimately was crowned Emperor Haile Selassie I of Ethiopia.

On 31 March 1930, during the Battle of Anchem, Wondosson Kassa made a name for himself fighting against and defeating Ras Gugsa Welle. He fought for his father and the Imperial Army and was on the side of Negus Tafari Makonnen. After Ras Gugsa Welle was killed, Negus Tafari gave Ras Kassa all of the lands controlled by Gugsa Welle. As a result, Wondosson Kassa was made Shum (Note: Roughly equivalent to Governor.) of Begemder Province. (Note: Some sources indicate that Ras Kassa was Shum of Begemder and Wondosson governed in his place. Other sources indicate Wondosson was Shum of Begemder.)

During the Second Italo-Ethiopian War, Wondosson Kassa again fought for his father on what was known as the "northern front." At the Second Battle of Tembien, the armies of his father and of Ras Seyum Mangasha were defeated in battle and bombed out of existence as they withdrew. Wondosson joined his father and the Emperor and was at the Battle of Maychew.

During the early days of the Italian occupation of Ethiopia, Wondosson Kassa was part of the armed Ethiopian resistance. Late in July 1936, he took part in the ill-fated attack on Addis Ababa along with his younger brothers, Aberra Kassa and Asfawossen Kassa. After the failure of that attack, he fled to avoid capture. However, on 19 December 1936, Wondosson Kassa was captured by the Wollo Oromo in a cave near the source of the Tekezé River. His place of capture was close to the Plains of Anchem where he had defeated Gugsa Welle in 1930. Some of the Oromo who captured him are said to have been among the Oromo who arrived late for the Battle of Anchem. Wondosson Kassa was executed by the Italians as a rebel.

== See also ==
- Monarchies of Ethiopia
- Ethiopian aristocratic and court titles

== Notes ==
Footnotes

Citations
