= Selale =

Former sub-province of north-central Ethiopia

Selale (Amharic: ሰላሌ, Oromo: Salaalee), was a province of the Ethiopian Empire located south of Gojjams Abay River, west of Merhabete's Wenchit River, and South of Weleka district Jemma River, north of Entoto Mountains, and east of the Muger River and centered around Grarya. It later became an awrajja, or sub-province, of Shewa. The region was home to the important Debre Libanos monastery built by Saint Tekle Haymanot who was born in Zorare, a district in Selale which lied on the eastern edge of Shewa, to a Christian Amhara family. An Oromo subgroup inhabiting the North Shewa Zone took their name from the original region. They have a population of approximately 2 million. The capital of the sub-province in the 20th century was Fiche.
