= Asfawossen Kassa =

Ethiopian army commander (1913–1936)

Asfawossen Kassa (1913 – 21 December 1936) was an army commander and a member of the royal family of the Ethiopian Empire.

== Biography ==
Prince (Leul) Asfawossen Kassa was the third son of Duke (Ras) Kassa Haile Darge. Kassa Haile Darge was a loyal ally of Negus Tafari Makonnen, who ultimately was crowned Emperor Haile Selassie I of Ethiopia.

During the Second Italo-Ethiopian War, Asfawossen Kassa fought for his father. At the Second Battle of Tembien, the armies of his father and Ras Seyum Mangasha were defeated in battle and bombed out of existence as they withdrew.

During the early days of the Italian occupation of Ethiopia, Asfawossen Kassa was part of the armed Ethiopian resistance. Late in July 1936, he took part in the ill-fated attack on Addis Ababa along with his brothers, Wondosson Kassa and Aberra Kassa. After the failure of that attack, he and Aberra Kassa fled together to avoid capture.

On 21 December 1936, Asfawossen Kassa and Aberra Kassa surrendered. They had been assured by Ras Hailu Tekle Haymanot that they would not be harmed. Hailu Tekle Haymanot was speaking on behalf of the Italian Viceroy and Governor-General of Ethiopia, Rodolfo Graziani. However, once in captivity, the bodyguards of the brothers were disarmed and they were executed by the Italians as rebels in the market square in Fikke.

== See also ==
- Monarchies of Ethiopia
- Ethiopian aristocratic and court titles

== Sources ==
- Mockler, Anthony (2002). Haile Sellassie's War. New York: Olive Branch Press. ISBN 978-1-56656-473-1.
