= Second battle of Tembien =

1936 battle of the Second Italo-Ethiopian War

- Part of the Second Italo-Abyssinian War
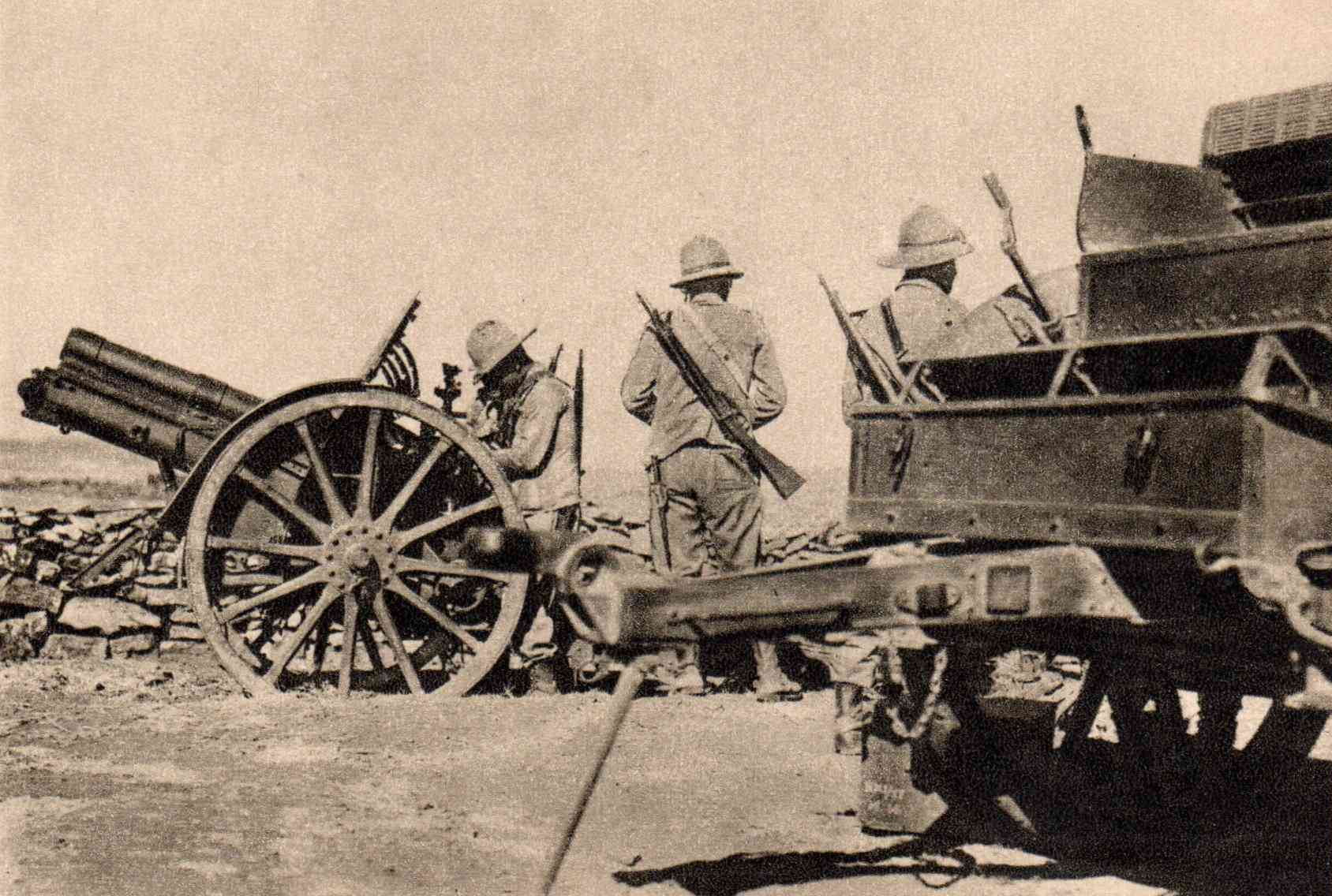
- Italian artillery in Tembien in 1936
Date	27–29 February 1936
Location	Tembien Province, Ethiopia
Result	Italian victory

Belligerents
Italy	Ethiopia

Commanders and leaders
Pietro Badoglio	Ras Kassa; Ras Seyoum

Strength
70,000 (Plus 50,000 in reserve)	40,000

Casualties and losses
600 casualties	8,000 casualties

The second battle of Tembien was fought on the northern front of the Second Italo-Ethiopian War. This battle consisted of attacks by Italian forces under Marshal Pietro Badoglio on Ethiopian forces under Ras (Note: Roughly equivalent to Duke.) Kassa Haile Darge and Ras Seyoum Mangasha. This battle, which resulted in a decisive defeat of Ethiopian forces, was primarily fought in the area around the Tembien Province. The battle is notable for the large-scale use of mustard gas by the Italians.

== Background ==
Italian offensives in 1936

In early January 1936 Ethiopian forces were in the hills overlooking the Italian positions and launching attacks against them on a regular basis. The Ethiopians facing the Italians were in three groups. In the center, near Abbi Addi and along the Beles River in the Tembien, were Ras Kassa with approximately 40,000 men and Ras Seyoum with about 30,000 men. On the Ethiopian right was Ras Mulugeta Yeggazu and his army of approximately 80,000 men in positions atop Amba Aradam. Ras Imru Haile Selassie with approximately 40,000 men was on the Ethiopian left in the area around Seleclaca in Shire Province. Only a minority of the Ethiopian soldiers had received military training, there were few modern weapons and less than one rifle per man.

Badoglio had five army corps at his disposal. On his right, he had the Italian IV Corps and the Italian II Corps facing Ras Imru in the Shire. In the Italian center was the Eritrean Corps facing Ras Kassa and Ras Seyoum in the Tembien. Facing Ras Mulugeta dug into Amba Aradam was the Italian I Corps and III Corps. Italian dictator Benito Mussolini was impatient for an Italian offensive to get under way.

Initially, Badoglio saw the destruction of Ras Mulugeta's army as his first priority. This force would have to be dislodged from its strong positions on Amba Aradam in order for the Italians to continue the advance towards Addis Ababa. But Ras Kassa and Ras Seyoumm were exerting such pressure from the Tembien that Badoglio decided that he would have to deal with them first. If the Ethiopian center was to successfully advance, I Corps and III Corps facing Ras Mulugeta would be cut off from reinforcement and resupply. From 20 January to 24 January, the first battle of Tembien was fought. This was fiercely fought, with the Ethiopians cutting off the Italian 1st CC.NN. Division "23 Marzo" for several days and Badoglio drawing up contingency plans for withdrawing the entire army. Eventually Italian pressure and the large scale use of mustard gas told and the threat Ras Kassa posed to the I Corps and III Corps was neutralized.

From the 10 to 19 February, Badoglio attacked the army of Ras Mulugeta, dug in on Amba Aradam during the Battle of Enderta. The Italians made good use of their artillery and aerial superiority, and again the heavy use of Mustard gas. Ras Mulugeta was killed and his army collapsed and was destroyed as a fighting force in the ensuing rout. With this completed, Badoglio turned back to the center to complete what he had started with the first battle of Tembien. He would leave the army of Ras Imru Haile Selassie for another day.

Badoglio now had three times the men fielded by the three remaining Ethiopian armies; extra divisions had arrived in Eritrea and the network of roads he needed to guarantee resupply had been all but completed. Even so, Badoglio stockpiled 48,000 shells and 7 million rounds of ammunition in forward areas before he started the attack.

Badoglio planned to send the III Corps towards Gaela to cut off the main line of withdrawal for Ras Kassa. After establishing itself across the roads running south from the Abbi Addi region, the Eritrean Corps would advance south from the Worsege (Italian: Uarieu) and Ab'aro passes. These moves by the III Corps and the Eritrean Corps would place the armies of Ras Kassa and Ras Seyoum in a trap. It is possible that Ras Kassa anticipated Badoglio's plan. He sent a wireless message to Emperor Haile Selassie requesting permission to withdraw from the Tembien. The request was superfluous, Selassie had already indicated that Ras Kassa should fall back towards Amba Aradam and link up with the remnants of Ras Mulageta's army.

== Battle ==
In accordance with Badoglio's plan, the Eritrean Corps advanced from the mountain passes and the III Corps moved up from the Geba Valley. The second battle of the Tembien was fought on terrain which favoured the defence. It was a region of forests, ravines, and torrents where the Italians were unable to deploy artillery properly or use armoured vehicles. However the Tigrayan soldiers of Ras Seyoum failed to take full advantage of the terrain.

=== Uork Amba ===
The right wing of the Ethiopian defenses, held by the Tigrayan army led by Ras Seyoum, rested on Uork Amba (the "mountain of gold"). The Ethiopians established a strong point there. Amba Work blocked the road to Abbi Addi on which the Eritrean Corps and the III Corp planned to converge. One-hundred-and-fifty Alpini and Blackshirt commandos were ordered to capture it under cover of darkness. A commando composed of 150 Alpini soldiers from the VII Battalion of Complements and Blackshirts was sent in the middle of the night, armed with grenades and daggers, to climb the amba and only at dawn on 27 February did the Tigrayans discover that the northern peak of the amba had been taken by a platoon under the command of Tito Polo, while the attempt to occupy the southern peak did not have the same success.

Early on the morning of the 27 February, the army of Ras Seyoum was drawn up in battle array in front of Abbi Addi. Heralded by the wail of battle horns and the roll of the war drums (negarait), a large force of Ethiopians left the shelter of the woods covering Debra Ansa to attack the Italians in the open. From 8:00am to 4:00pm, wave after wave of Ethiopians attempted to break through or get around the positions established by the Alpini and the Eritrean columns, but the Alpini troops, reinforced in the meantime by a platoon of machine gunners, managed to resist and maintain control of the summit. As the attacks wavered, the Eritrean columns descended from the Abarò and Uarieu passes and managed to advance, by the evening all the pre-established objectives had been achieved. Ras Seyoum decided that his men could take no more. His army left more than one-thousand dead on the battlefield as it fled.

While the Tigrayan army of Ras Seyoum was retreating in disarray, Bastico's 33,000 men supplied by airdrops were descending into the Ghevà valley behind the Ethiopian deployment. During the maneuver, the Italian troops would have been exposed in a critical situation to the attack of the Ethiopian troops who, however, did not guard the Ghevà but were positioned further north. This error by the Ethiopian deployment allowed the men of the III Army Corps to ford the river without problems and to deploy with the 1st CC.NN. Division "23 Marzo" on the right and the 1st Eritrean Division on the left. With his right flank in the air, Ras Seyoum ordered his army to pull back to the Tekezé fords. But, as his men straggled back along the one road open to them, they were bombed repeatedly. The rocky ravine where they were to cross the river turned out to be a bottleneck. The Italian bombers focused on the concentrated solid mass of the fleeing Tigrayans and soon the area was turned into a charnel house.

=== Debra Amba ===
Meanwhile, Ras Kassa and his army on Debra Amba had not yet seen action. On the 28th, troops of the III Corps made contact with the Ethiopian defenses of Ras Kassa, which, after three hours of fierce fighting, began to crumble and retreated toward the capital of Tembien: Abbi Addi. Capitalizing on this success, Bastico pushed his men further forward, moving the 1st Eritrean Division into the Tonquà Valley, from where artillery could already be aimed at Abbi Addi and the 1st "23 Marzo" CC.NN. Division toward Amba Tzellerè, which was occupied during the night.

On the same day, Pirzio Biroli's troops forded the Beles and in the locality of Daran, where only a month before the encirclement of the Diamanti column had taken place in the battle of Uarieu Pass, they engaged in battle with the enemy, this time however the balance of forces was very different and the Abyssinian troops were routed and forced to retreat from Debra Amba, this allowed the closure of the pincer movement foreseen by Badoglio at 3 km from Abbi Addi which was occupied on the 29th, annihilating the remaining defences.

On 29 February, the III Corps and the Eritrean Corps linked up about three miles west of Abbi Addi and the trap was complete. Even so, a large portion of both Ethiopian armies managed to escape Badoglio's dragnet. However, the men who escaped were demoralized and with little or no equipment. By the time Ras Kassa and Ras Seyoum reached Haile Selassie's headquarters at Korem two weeks later, they were accompanied by little more than the men of their personal bodyguards.

== Aftermath ==
Writing as a correspondent at Italian Military Headquarters, Herbert L. Matthews of the New York Times, cabled the following to his paper:

Ras Kassa's army in the Tembien region of Ethiopia, northwest of Makale, has been destroyed. He himself is fleeing for his life with a few followers. Now between the Italian forces and Addis Ababa all Northern Ethiopia lies open and almost defenseless. Only Emperor Haile Selassie's private army can offer resistance, and it is not expected to be serious.

A United Press correspondent wrote:

Using his entire northern army of 300,000, Badoglio shattered the armies of Ras Kassa and Ras Seyoum... The Victory saw Fascist legions occupy strategic Golden Mountain [Amba Work], giving Badoglio control of northern Ethiopia.

Ras Mulugeta was dead. Ras Kassa and Ras Seyoum were beaten. All three armies commanded by these men had been effectively destroyed. Only one of the four main northern armies remained intact. Badoglio now turned his attention towards Ras Imru and his forces in the Shire. Both Ras Kassa and Ras Seyoum were present at Maychew, the final battle of the war.

== See also ==
- List of Second Italo-Ethiopian War weapons of Ethiopia
- List of Italian military equipment in the Second Italo-Ethiopian War

== See also ==
- Ethiopian Order of Battle Second Italo-Abyssinian War
- Army of the Ethiopian Empire
- Italian Order of Battle Second Italo-Abyssinian War
- Royal Italian Army
