= Fiche, Ethiopia =

Town in Oromia Region, Ethiopia

Fiche Fichee (Oromo)
- Town
- Location within Ethiopia
- Coordinates: 9°48′N 38°44′E
- Country: Ethiopia
- Region: Oromia
- Zone: North Shewa
- Elevation: 2,738 m (8,983 ft)

Population (2007)
  - Total: 27,493
- Time zone: UTC+3 (EAT)
- Area code: 11

Fiche is a town in central Ethiopia. It is the administrative centre of the Northern Shewa Zone in Oromia. It is located about three kilometers from the main Addis Ababa-Debre Marqos road, Fiche has a latitude and longitude of 9°48′N 38°44′E and an elevation between 2,738 and 2,782 metres above sea level.

Notable landmarks in Fiche include the Fiche St. George Ethiopian Orthodox and Medhane Alem Bete Kristiyan churches. The town is also home to several notable Ethiopian painters of religious themes: Alaqa Gebre Selassie Adil (1881–1975), Emealaf Hiruy (1907–1971), and Ale Felege Selam (1924–2016).

== History ==
Ras Kassa Haile Darge ruled the former province of Selale from Fiche in the early 20th century.

The deposed Lij Iyasu was imprisoned in Ras Kassa's house until he escaped in 1931. In 1936, after Ras Hailu Tekle Haymanot convinced them to surrender at the beginning of the Italian Occupation, Ras Kassa's two sons Aberra and Asfawossen were executed in Fiche. W.E.D. Allen passed through Fiche in 1941, and describes the town as having "the usual character of Abyssinian country towns: an agglomeration of huts standing in rather dreary eucalyptus groves and dominated by a fort and the European villa of the Ras." He also noted that "Fiche has a certain strategic importance in the feudal politics of Abyssinia since it lies across the main line of communication between the capital and Gojjam; and in the period of coup d'etats in the '20s the lord of Salale was always in the position to intervene suddenly in the capital only 70 miles away."

By 1958, Fiche was one of 27 places in Ethiopia officially ranked as a First Class Township. The army base of the 1st brigade of the Ethiopian Territorial Army, located at Fiche, was used by the Derg to put conscripts of the People's Militia (reconstituted in the spring of 1977 as the "Red Army") through a twelve-week basic training with modern weapons.

The municipality announced in February 2009 that it had begun various development works totaling 5.6 million birr, which included construction of alleys, ditches, an abattoir, and expansion of water, health and electric power services.

== Demographics ==
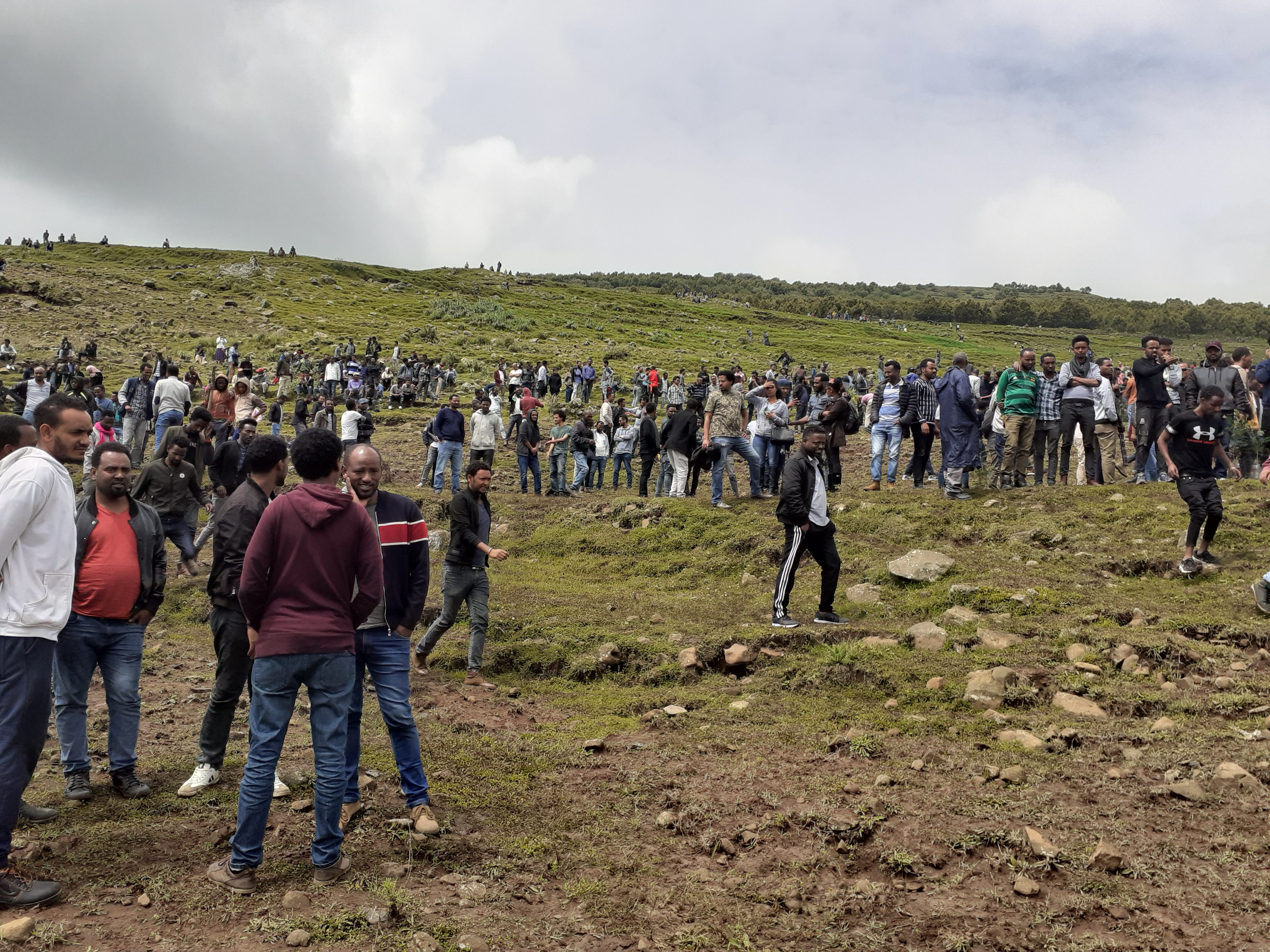
People walking through Fiche Mountains

The 2007 national census reported a total population for Fiche of 27,493, of whom 12,933 were men and 14,560 were women. The majority of the inhabitants (94.42%) reported that they practiced Ethiopian Orthodox Christianity, and 3.61% were Protestant.

Based on figures from the Central Statistical Agency in 2005, Fiche has an estimated total population of 37,861 of whom 18,446 are men and 19,415 women. The 1994 census reported this town had a total population of 21,187 of whom 10,004 were men and 11,183 were women.

== University ==
The Selale University (Ge'ez: ሰላሌ ዩኒቨርሲቲ, also spelled Salale University) is a public higher education institution located in the town of Fiche, capital of the North Shewa Zone in Ethiopia's Oromia Region. Established in 2016, it is part of Ethiopia's fourth-generation universities aimed at expanding access to higher education across the country. It was founded in 2016 in Fiche, approximately 114 kilometers north of Addis Ababa, under Ethiopia's higher education expansion efforts, focusing on improving access, equity, and educational quality.
