= Kassa Haile Darge =

Ethiopian noble (1881–1956)

Kassa Hailu GCVO GBE
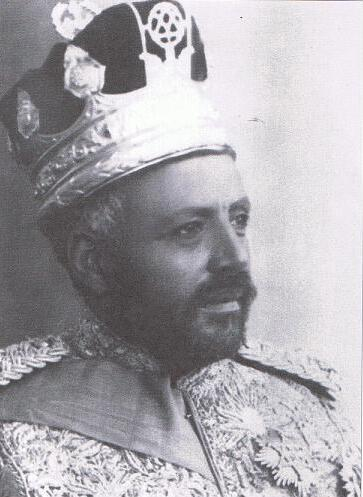
- Born: 8 July 1881; Selale, Shewa, Ethiopian Empire
- Died: 16 November 1956 (aged 75); Addis Ababa, Ethiopian Empire
- Burial: Debre Libanos
- Spouse: Tsige Mariam Beshah
- Issue: Aberra Kassa; Asfawossen Kassa; Wondosson Kassa; Asrate Kassa; Bizunesh Kassa; Manayalush Kassa; Tessemia Kassa
- Mother: Princess Tisseme of Selale
- Military career
- Allegiance: Ethiopian Empire
- Service years: 1928-1956
- Conflicts: Second Italo-Ethiopian War; Christmas Offensive; First Battle of Tembien; Second Battle of Tembien

President of the Crown Council of Ethiopia
- In office 13 July 1941 – 16 November 1956
- Monarch: Haile Selassie I

Ras Kassa Hailu (Amharic: ካሣ ኀይሉ ዳርጌ; 7 August 1881 – 16 November 1956) was an Ethiopian nobleman, the son of Dejazmach Haile Wolde Kiros of Lasta, the ruling heir of Lasta's throne and younger brother of Emperor Tekle Giyorgis II, and Tisseme Darge, the daughter of Ras Darge Sahle Selassie, brother of Menelik II's father.

John Spencer, who advised Ras Kassa during the writing of the 1955 Constitution of Ethiopia, described him as "surely the most conservative of all the rases in constant attendance at the court." Spencer continued his description of the aristocrat by noting that he rarely saw the Ras "in other than Ethiopian national dress. Large, bearded and silent, this imposing dignitary wore a black cloak with gold clasps worked into the form of lion heads. In working sessions, he used to take out with considerable pride a pair of folding half-lens spectacles with gold frames and bows."

== Life ==
Although he had by birth a better claim to the throne than his younger cousin Ras Tafari (the later Emperor Haile Selassie I), Kassa valued loyalty over ambition, and was content with his fief of Selale province near the monastery of Debre Libanos. During the rise of Emperor Haile Selassie I, Ras Kassa was loyal to Selassie during numerous challenges to his rule, standing by his side during more than one uprising. His most notable act supporting Haile Selassie was his role in neutralizing the threat of Dajazmach Balcha Safo in 1928.

Ras Kassa served as Qegnazmach ("Commander of the Army of the Right") during the Second Italo-Abyssinian War. His forces fought in the First Battle of Tembien and the Second Battle of Tembien. Following the Ethiopian defeat he went into exile with his Emperor, spending most of his time in Jerusalem.

The sons of Ras Kassa stayed in Ethiopia and were part of the resistance to the Italian occupation. In late 1936, three of his four sons were captured and executed: Wondosson Kassa, Aberra Kassa, and Asfawossen Kassa.

In early 1941, during the East African Campaign of World War II, Ras Kassa returned to Ethiopia with the Emperor and Gideon Force.

Ras Kassa killed a few Italians and Italian ex-Askaris in reprisal for his three sons' deaths and was criticised by the Emperor who had called against reprisals to not "indulge in the atrocities which the enemy has been practicing." Ras Kassa then retired to Fiche with some ten thousand armed men.

After the war, he became a Crown Counsellor.
