= Princess Tsehai =

Child of Ethiopian Emperor Haile Selassie

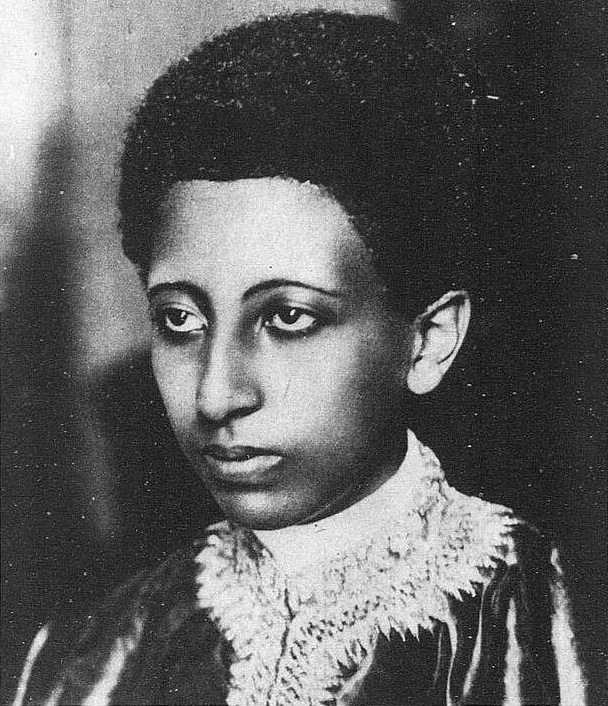
- Tsehai in 1936
- Born: 13 October 1919; Addis Ababa, Ethiopian Empire
- Died: 17 August 1942 (aged 22); Nekemte, Ethiopian Empire
- Burial: Ba'eta Le Mariam Monastery
- Spouse: Lieutenant-General Lij Abiye Abebe
Names
- Walatta Birhane
- Dynasty: House of Solomon
- Father: Haile Selassie
- Mother: Menen Asfaw
- Religion: Ethiopian Orthodox Tewahedo

Princess Tsehai Haile Selassie (13 October 1919 – 17 August 1942) was the third daughter and fourth child of Emperor Haile Selassie and Empress Menen Asfaw of Ethiopia.

== Biography ==
Princess Tsehai was born in Addis Ababa. She often accompanied the Emperor to public events during his exile in Great Britain (1936–1941), where she trained as a nurse at London's Great Ormond Street Hospital for Sick Children. She graduated as a state registered children's nurse on 25 August 1939. After the restoration of her father in 1941, she married Lieutenant-General (later Brigadier-General) Lij Abiye Abebe, and moved with him to Welega Province when he was appointed governor there.

She later worked at Dessie Hospital in Ethiopia.

Princess Tsehai died in Nekemte on 17 August 1942, from complications during childbirth. Her baby did not survive. She was buried in the crypt of the Ba'eta Le Mariam Monastery in Addis Ababa that had been built as the mausoleum church of Emperor Menelik II.

Emperor Haile Selassie founded the Princess Tsehai Memorial Hospital in her memory, which also served as a nursing school and which project was initially launched by Sylvia Pankhurst. After the 1974 revolution, the hospital was renamed the Armed Forces General Hospital.

== Patronages ==
- Honorary President of the Association for the Benefit of Ethiopian Women (1935–1942).

== Honours ==
=== National honours ===
- Knight Grand Cordon with Collar of the Order of the Queen of Sheba (1930).
- Imperial Coronation Medal (1930).

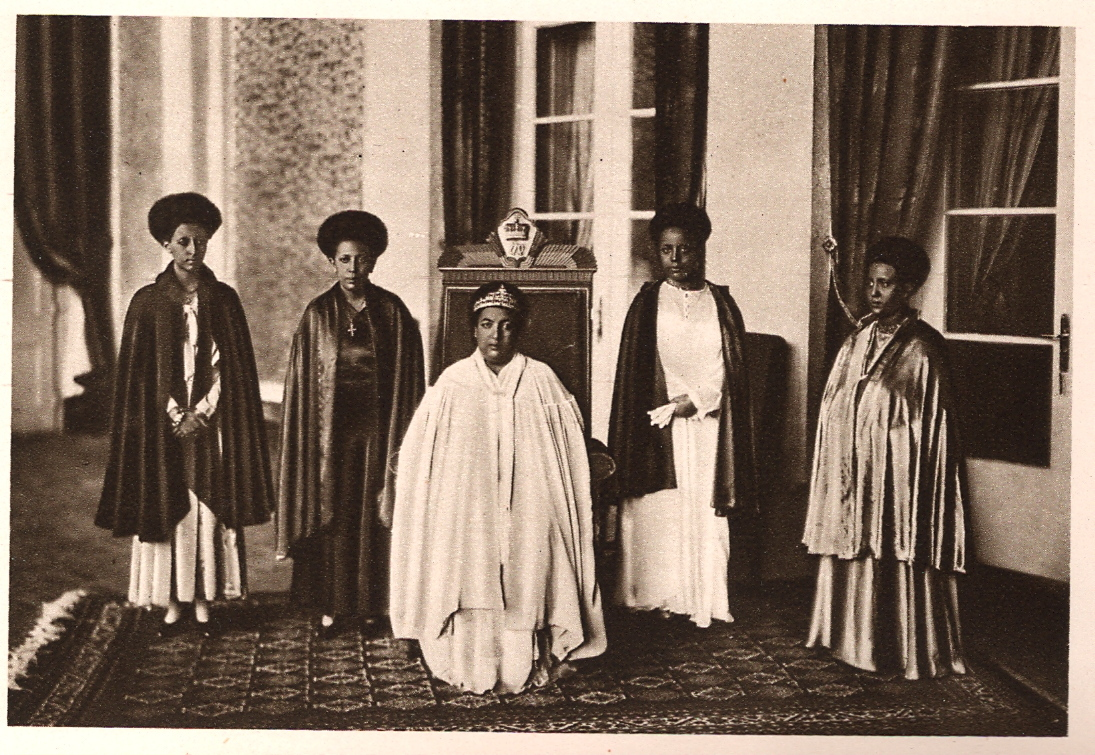
Empress Menen Asfaw is seated in the centre, and standing women from left to right are Princess Tsehai, Princess Tenagnework, and Princess Zenebework, her daughters, and on the far right is Princess Wolete Israel Seyoum, her daughter-in-law.

== Ancestry ==
Ancestors of Princess Tsehai

16. Dejazmach Wolde Malakot Yamana Krestos
8. Dejazmach Wolde Mikael Wolde Malakot
17. Woizero Kalama Worq
4. Ras Mäkonnen Wäldä-Mika'él
18. Negus Sahle Selassie
9. Immabet Tenagnework Sahle Selassie
19. Woizero Yimegnushal Ayele
2. Emperor Haile Selassie I
10. Dejazmach Ali Abba Jifar
5. Woizero Yeshimebet Ali
22. Ato Yimeru of Gurage
11. Immabet-Hoy Walatta Ihata Giyorgis Yimeru
23. Woizero Araza-Aregai
1. Princess Tsehai of Ethiopia
6. Dejazmach Asfaw Mikael, Jantirar of Ambassel
3. Itege Menen Asfaw
28. Imam Ali Abba Bula
14. Negus Mikael
29. Woizero Getie
7. Woizero Sehin Mikael
30. Gabru
15. Woizero Fantaye
31. Hirut
