= Amba Geshen =

Mountain in northern Ethiopia

- Gishen Mariam
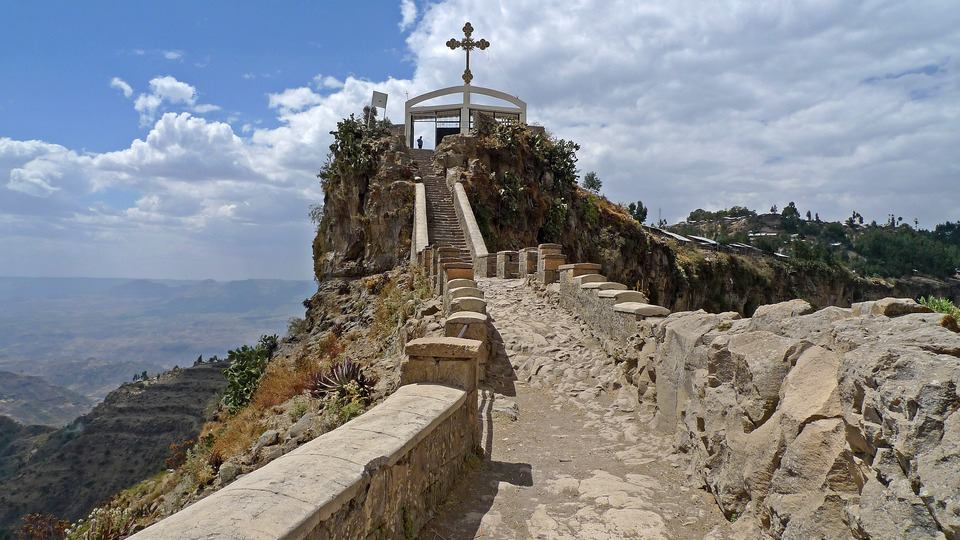
- Mount Amba Geshen in northern Ethiopia

Highest point
- Coordinates: 11°31′12″N 39°21′35″E

Geography
- Location within Ethiopia
- Location: Ambassel, Amhara Region, Ethiopia

Amba Geshen is the name of a mountain in northern Ethiopia. It is in Ambassel, South Wollo Zone of the Amhara Region, northwest of Dessie, at a latitude and a longitude of 11°31′N 39°21′E. Part of Ambassel woreda, Amba Geshen is one of the mountains of Ethiopia where most of the male heirs to the Emperor of Ethiopia were interned, usually for life. Also known as Gishen Mariam, it was the second of the three such mountains, or amba, said to have been used for this purpose, the other two being Debre Damo and Wehni.

== History ==
The title of "Jantirar" was borne historically by the head of the family holding this mountain fortress of Ambassel. Due to the origin of the Solomonic Dynasty in Bete Amhara, the regions rulers played a disproportionate role in the politics of the Ethiopian state. The Jantirar ruled the center of Bete Amhara and lordship of Yekuno Amlak himself prior to his ascension as Emperor of Ethiopia. While that artistocratic family is said to be one of the most noble in Ethiopian history, they never ruled any larger realm than their own district (although this is contested). Menen Asfaw, empress consort of Haile Selassie, was a daughter of Jantirar Asfaw.

From some undetermined time, it was the practice that when the Ethiopian emperor assumed the throne, his brothers and other male relatives would be taken to a royal prison, where they would henceforth live until either they were called forth to become the new emperor or they died. Some traditions state this began during the Zagwe dynasty, others even earlier; the first certain mention of the practice was during the reign of Jin Asgad, who confined his brothers and his own sons to Amba Geshen.

The use of Amba Geshen as a prison was ended by Emperor Na'od, but Manoel de Almeida mentions that "those who were there before" were guarded until the reign of Emperor Gelawdewos, when only the descendants of Emperor Takla Maryam continued to be kept under watch because of their treachery against Emperor Baeda Maryam I.

Because it was a natural fortress, the Emperors also kept the imperial treasury there even after it was no longer a royal prison. The Muslims, under Ahmad ibn Ibrahim, made several attempts to capture Amba Geshen: the Futuh al-Habasha describes the first (in November 1531) and second (in 1533), both failing. His final attempt in 1540 was successful, and he put the entire garrison and inhabitants to death.

Thomas Pakenham notes that contemporary Ethiopians believe that the True Cross was buried atop Amba Geshen by St Helena of Constantinople, perhaps due to an alleged piece of the true cross being gifted from the Venetian Republic to Ethiopia in the medieval period at the request of Dawit I

The King Zarʾa Yāʿqob spent almost thirty years on ʾAmbā Gǝšan before he ascended the throne in 1434. At the time, its scriptorium produced manuscripts of outstanding quality, such the Golden Codex (EMML 9002) and Maṣḥafa ṭefut.

== Amba Geshen in European texts ==
Although the first European to mention Amba Geshen was Francisco Álvares, who witnessed an escaped prince being returned to Amba Geshen, the earliest European to accurately describe Amba Geshen was Almeida, who states it is

nearly round, though on top it appears to have the shape of a cross. Going along the edge of the rock, it is probably little more than half a league round on top, but one would have to walk for half a day to go round it on foot at the base. Its height is such that a stone thrown from a sling by a strong arm would reach from the bottom to the top with great difficulty. It is precipitous rock all round and in places it turns outward in such a way that it is impossible to get in. There is only one way in which... called Macaraquer.

Almeidez further writes that on top there was a natural pool and spring for water, and covered by kosso and zegba brush and wild cedars. He mentions two churches: Egzyabeher Ab, built by Emperor Lalibela, and Tekle Maryam, begun by Emperor Na'od but completed by his son, Lebna Dengel, which survived Ahmed ibn Ibrahim al-Ghazi's ravages.

However, when Pakenham visited Amba Geshen in 1955, he found that both churches had been rebuilt with tin roofs.

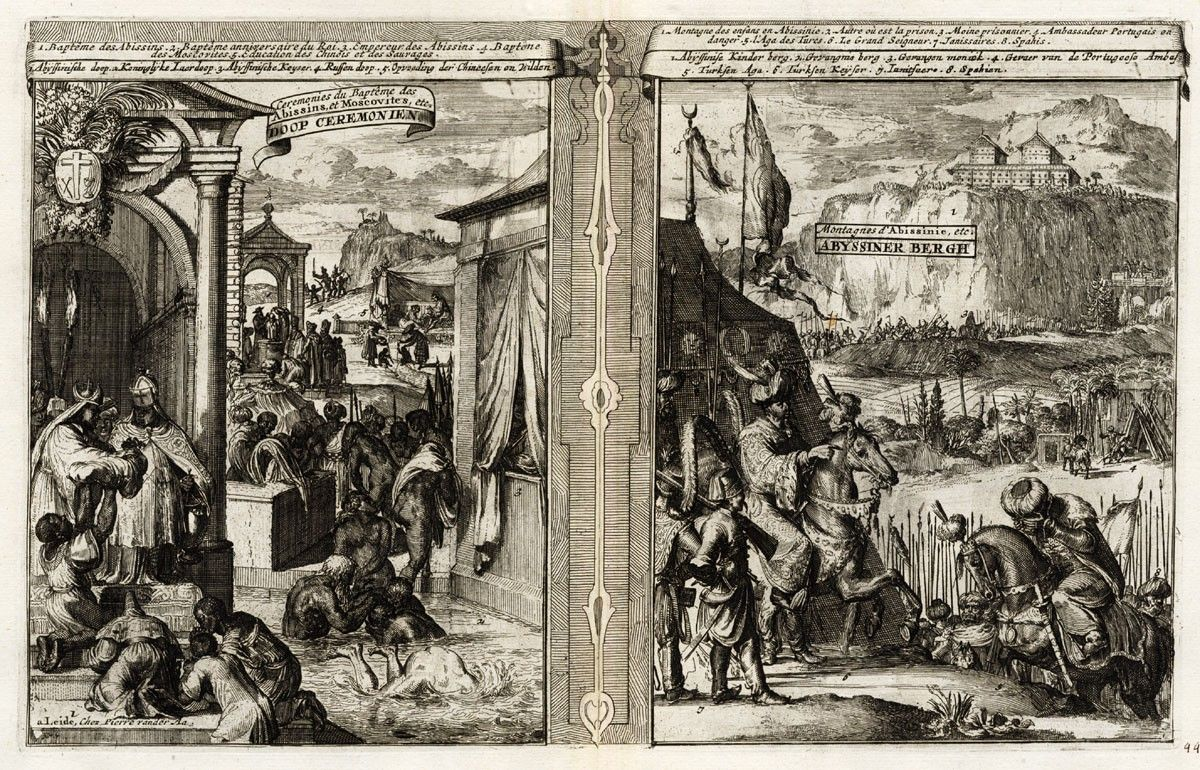
European depiction of Amba Geshen, captioned "Abyssinian mountain of children" in French and Dutch

An account of Amba Geshen was published in Purchas, His Pilgrimage where it was called Mount Amara, where medieval Amhara kings of Ethiopia used to be imprisoned. This was stated by Pakenham to have inspired John Milton's description of Paradise in Paradise Lost, and later, "Mount Abora" in Samuel Taylor Coleridge's Kubla Khan.

"Nor where Abassin Kings thir issue Guard,

Mount Amara, though this by som suppos'd

True Paradise under the Ethiop Line" — John Milton

In Samuel Johnson's Rasselas, the main character is a prince of Ethiopia who is interned in a mountain sanctuary called the "Happy Valley." To explore the world and find his own happiness, he escapes. Johnson's account was based on the travel account of Jerónimo Lobo.
