= Leul Sagad =

Courtier and army commander of the Ethiopian Empire

Leul Sagad Atnaf Sagad (Note: Leul Sagad is also spelled in various sources as Leul Seged and Lul Seged Atnafseged) (died 17 October 1916), also known by his horse name Abba Balay, was an Ethiopian courtier and army commander (Ras) under Emperor Menelik II. A key figure in late 19th and early 20th century, he was responsible for several successful military campaigns, but was killed in battle during the struggle over Menelik's succession.

== Life ==
=== Background ===
Of Amhara nobility. Leul Sagad was a member of the influential Addisge family clan of Shewa. His father, Atnaf Sagad held the rank of Dejazmach.

Leul Seged was closely connected to the Ethiopian court through his brother Wube Atnaf Sagad, who was the second husband of Menelik's daughter Zewditu. His cousin, Tessema Nadew was also an influential figure at Menelik's court and Enderase (regent) during Menelik's final illness.

=== Military and court career ===
Much of Lul Seged's activity was in the south of the country, particularly in Sidamo, where Menelik's regime had begun showing expansionist interest in the late 1880s. In 1891 Lul Seged, then holding the rank of Dejazmach, set up a permanent garrison at Shisha. In 1894-5, he mounted a successful conquest of the entire province: Menelik afterwards raised him to the rank of Ras. He is also thought to have been responsible for the Ethiopian annexation of Konso in 1896. After 1896, however, Lul Seged was removed from power in Sidamo in favour of Dejazmach Balcha Safo, allegedly because he had failed to appear in the Adwa campaign, although other sources claim that Lul Seged was rewarded by Menelik for bravery at Adwa.

In 1907 he was made governor of Bale province, and also governed Kaffa Province. British intelligence documents of the period described Lul Seged as "one of the ablest men in Abyssinia", but identified him as one of the main opponents of European influence on the country.

In common with others of his class Lul Seged sought to increase his influence through marriage, and late in life he married Menen Asfaw, later the wife of Tafari Makonnen (Haile Selassie), with the approval of her grandfather Negus Mikael. After two years she ran away to Addis Ababa and sought a divorce: Lul Seged was reportedly furious, and became an implacable opponent of her new husband Tafari.

After Ras Tessema's death in 1911, Lul Seged was appointed regent by Menelik's heir Iyasu, in the process making an enemy of Minister of War Habte Giyorgis. Despite this, Lul Seged was eventually persuaded to turn against Iyasu, with whom his relationship had remained rather cool following the latter's involvement in Menen Asfaw's divorce and remarriage.

== Death ==
Iyasu was deposed on 27 September 1916 by a council of nobles and clergy, who installed Menelik's daughter Zewditu as Empress and nominated Lul Seged's rival, Tafari, as her heir apparent. Much to Tafari's reported surprise, Lul Seged brought his army to the capital and was one of the first nobles to declare his allegiance to Zewditu. Following the palace coup, Iyasu's father, Negus Mikael, assembled an army in the north to retake the capital and reinstate his son on the throne. Mikael and 80,000 men set out from Wollo on 7 October.

As the imperial army was still in preparation, Lul Seged was dispatched north to Ankober with an advance guard of a few thousand to put a stop to Mikael's advance. Lul Seged arrived south of Ankober on 16 October, and Mikael initially fell back. However, Lul Seged's vastly outnumbered army was practically wiped out a day later in a furious action at Tora Mesk after it tried to stop Fitawrari Sirah Bazu's troops, supporting Mikael, from taking Ankober. The 'official' imperial chronicle represented Lul Seged as resisting suggestions to retreat: "I will not be the laughing stock of Wollo. If you are afraid, flee! I shall fight as long as I can and I shall die here". Lul Seged was amongst those killed, alongside Tessema Gazmu, commander of the palace guard, and several other nobles. News of the disaster shocked Addis Ababa, but Negus Mikael was to be defeated several days later at the Battle of Segale.

Wilfred Thesiger, who lived in Addis Ababa in 1916, later recalled both the "wailing" at the news of Lul Seged's defeat, and seeing the victory parade after Segale: "The most moving moment of that wildly exciting day was when the drums suddenly stopped and in utter silence a few hundred men in torn, white everyday clothes came slowly down the long avenue of waiting troops led by a young boy. It was Ras Lul Seged's son bringing in the remnants of his father's army, which had gone into battle five thousand strong."

Ras Lul Seged was buried in Debre Berhan Selassie church.
