= Princess Zenebework =

Second daughter of Emperor Haile Selassie (1917–1934)

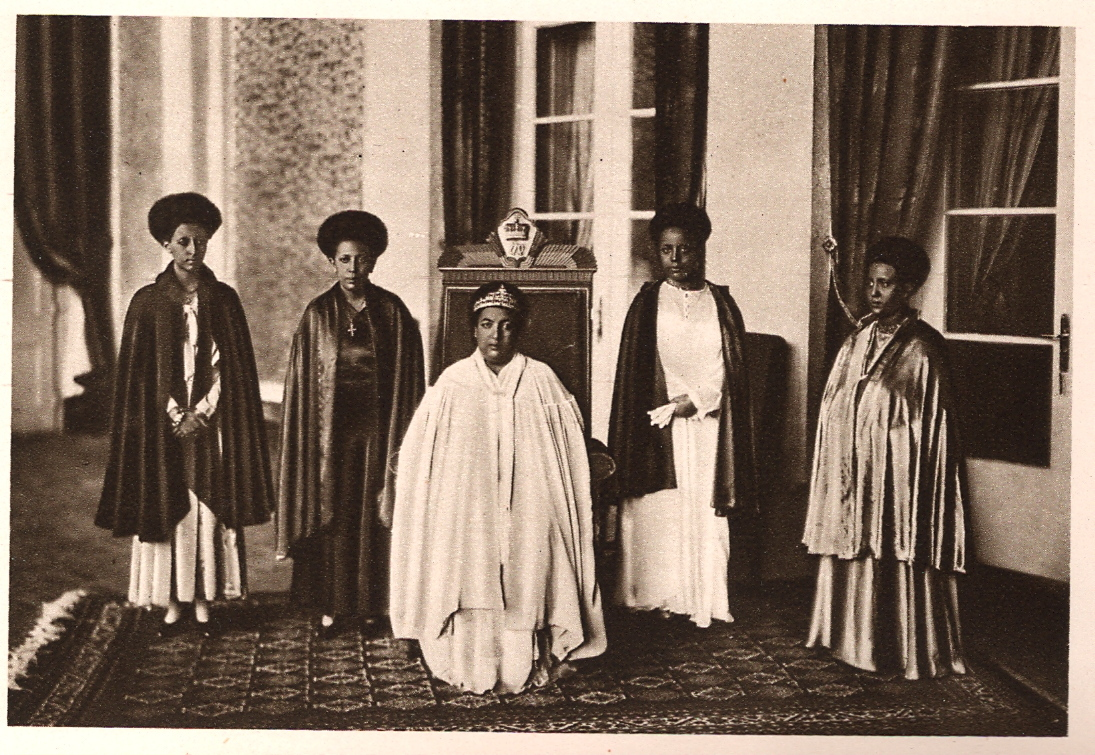
- Princess Zenebework second from the left, along with her mother and siblings
- Born: 25 July 1917; Addis Ababa, Ethiopian Empire
- Died: 24 March 1934 (aged 16); Mekelle, Tigray Province, Ethiopian Empire (now Tigray Region, Ethiopia)
- Burial: Holy Trinity Cathedral
- Spouse: Dejazmach Haile Selassie Gugsa
Names
- Hirute Selassie
- Dynasty: House of Solomon
- Father: Haile Selassie
- Mother: Menen Asfaw
- Religion: Ethiopian Orthodox Tewahedo

Princess Zenebework (25 July 1917 – 24 March 1934), also called Zeneba Worq, was the second daughter of Emperor Haile Selassie of Ethiopia, and his wife the Empress Menen Asfaw. Zenebework's full title was "Her Imperial Highness, Princess Zenebework Haile Selassie".

== Biography ==
On 15 June 1932, Princess (Leult) Zenebework was married to the hereditary prince of eastern Tigray Province, Dejazmach Haile Selassie Gugsa, a great-grandson of Emperor Yohannes IV. She was not yet 15 years old when they were married in Addis Ababa. Haile Selassie Gugsa was the son of Ras Gugsa Araya Selassie. He was thus the great-grandson of Emperor Yohannes IV of Ethiopia by his son Ras Araya Selassie. At the time, western Tigray was ruled by Ras Seyoum Mengesha, the son of Ras Mengesha Yohannes, another heir of Emperor Yohannes. The marriage between Princess Zenebework and Dejazmach Haile Selassie Gugsa was part of a dynastic alliance that also included the marriage of her brother, Crown Prince Asfaw Wossen to Princess Wolete Israel Seyoum, the daughter of Ras Seyoum Mengesha.

Ties were thus strengthened between the reigning Shewa branch of the Imperial dynasty with both rival sides of the Tigrean branch of the dynasty. The marriage between Princess Zenebework and Dejazmach Haile Selassie however was evidently not a happy one, and the Princess is said to have complained of poor treatment. On his side, Dejazmach Haile Selassie resented that his cousin and rival Seyoum held the title of Ras while he was relegated to the lower rank of Dejazmach. The two branches of Emperor Yohannes's family had long competed for seniority, and although the province of Tigray had been split between them, Haile Selassie Gugsa resented not having the title of Ras. Princess Zenebework died suddenly in 1934, and upon hearing of her death, the distraught Emperor ordered that her body be flown immediately from Mekele and be brought to Addis Ababa for burial. The reasons for this are unclear, but it may have had something to do with the Princess having repeatedly complained of her treatment at the hands of her husband and his family. This added to the resentment felt by her husband towards the Emperor, and a chill developed between the Emperor and his son-in-law.

Upon the Italian invasion in 1935, Dejazmach Haile Selassie Gugsa shocked the Imperial family and his country by being among the first to join the Italians. The Italians rewarded him with the title of Ras, and recognized him as the senior prince of Tigray over Ras Seyoum who would later surrender to them and be placed under house arrest. Following the liberation of 1941, Haile Selassie Gugsa was labeled a traitor, and was placed under house arrest. His title of Ras that was bestowed by the Italians was not recognized by the Ethiopian government and he reverted to his old title of Dejazmach. He was not freed from his house arrest until after the fall of the Ethiopian monarchy in 1974, and died shortly thereafter.

Princess Zenebework is buried in the Imperial family crypt under Holy Trinity Cathedral in Addis Ababa. A hospital in the city was established in her memory.

== Honours ==
- Dame Grand Cordon of the Order of the Queen of Sheba (1930).
- Imperial Coronation Medal (1930).

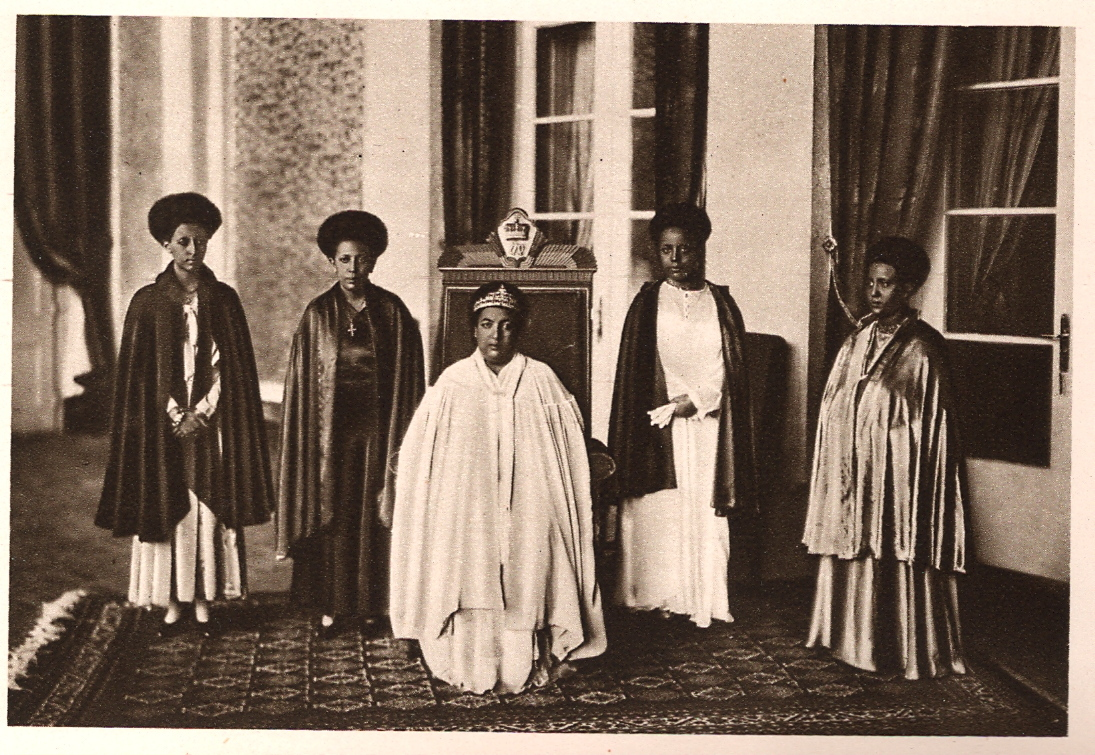
Empress Menen Asfaw seated in the center and Standing women from left to right are Princess Tsehai, Princess Tenagnework, and Princess Zenebework, her daughters, and on the far right is Princess Wolete Israel Seyoum, her daughter-in-law.

== Ancestry ==
Ancestors of Princess Zenebework

16. Dejazmach Wolde Malakot Yamana Krestos
8. Dejazmach Wolde Mikael Wolde Malakot
17. Woizero Kalama Worq
4. Ras Mäkonnen Wäldä-Mika'él
18. Negus Sahle Selassie
9. Immabet Tenagnework Sahle Selassie
19. Woizero Yimegnushal Ayele
2. Emperor Haile Selassie I
10. Dejazmach Ali Abba Jifar
5. Woizero Yeshimebet Ali
22. Ato Yimeru of Gurage
11. Immabet-Hoy Walatta Ihata Giyorgis Yimeru
23. Woizero Araza-Aregai
1. Princess Zenebework of Ethiopia
6. Dejazmach Asfaw Mikael, Jantirar of Ambassel
3. Itege Menen Asfaw
28. Imam Ali Abba Bula
14. Negus Mikael
29. Woizero Getie
7. Woizero Sehin Mikael
30. Gabru
15. Woizero Fantaye
31. Hirut
