= Sara Gizaw =

- Duchess of Harar
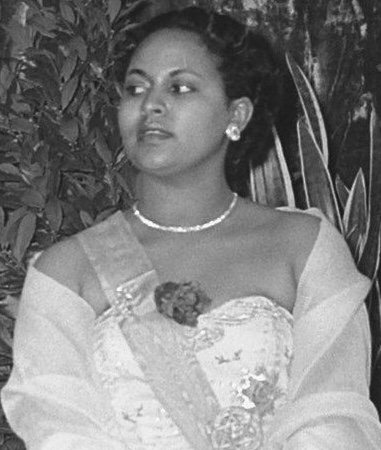
- Sara in 1954
- Born: 1 January 1929; Rayana Kobo, Wollo Province, Ethiopian Empire
- Died: 17 February 2019 (aged 90); Addis Ababa, Ethiopia
- Burial: Holy Trinity Cathedral
- Spouse: Prince Makonnen, Duke of Harar
- Issue: Prince Paul Wossen; Prince Mikael; Prince Dawit; Prince Taffari; Prince Beede Mariam
- House: House of Solomon
- Father: Gizaw Abera
- Mother: Aisha Tola
- Religion: Ethiopian Orthodox Tewahedo

Princess Sara Gizaw, Duchess of Harar (1 January 1929 – 17 February 2019) was the widow of Prince Makonnen, Duke (Mesfin) of Harar and second son of Emperor Haile Selassie of Ethiopia.

== Biography ==
Princess Sara was born on 1 January 1929. Her father was Gizaw Abera, a former Nibure Id of Axum, and her paternal grandfather was Dejazmach Abera Tedla. Her mother was Aisha Tola, a Muslim woman from Tigray.

She was educated at the Royal Infirmary Nursing School of Edinburgh.

She was the mother of five sons, Paul Wossen Makonnen, Mikael Makonnen, Dawit Makonnen (also known as Makonnen Makonnen), Tefferi Makonnen, and Beede Mariam Makonnen. In her day, Princess Sara was renowned as one of the most beautiful women at the Court of the Emperor of Ethiopia. She was widowed in 1957 when her husband, the Duke of Harar, was killed in a car accident. She often accompanied the Emperor on foreign visits, and acted as one of his official hostesses along with Princess Tenagnework after the death of Empress Menen.

Princess Sara was imprisoned with the other women of the Imperial Family of Ethiopia in 1974, and was released from prison in 1988. She resided in Addis Ababa. Princess Sara's eldest son, Prince Paul Wossen Seged was second in line to the Ethiopian throne, and prior to his death, was expected to become heir presumptive as the current claimant, Crown Prince Zera Yacob Amha Selassie has no legitimate son.

== Death ==
Princess Sara died on 17 February 2019, at the age of 90.

== Honours ==
=== National dynastic ===
- (Ethiopia) House of Solomon: Dame Grand Cordon of the Imperial Order of the Queen of Sheba
- (Ethiopia) House of Solomon: Recipient of the Silver Anniversary Medal of Emperor Haile Selassie I and Empress Menen
- (Ethiopia) House of Solomon: Recipient of the Emperor Haile Selassie I Ruby Jubilee and 75th Birthday Medal

=== Foreign ===
- Germany: Dame Grand Cross of the Order of Merit of the Federal Republic of Germany (1954)
- Netherlands: Dame Grand Cross of the Order of the House of Orange
- Sweden : Member of the Royal Order of the Seraphim (15 November 1954)
- Greece : Dame Grand Cross of the Order of Beneficence (1954)
- Austria : Grand Decoration of Honour in Gold with Sash for Services to the Republic of Austria (1954)
