= Menen Asfaw =

Empress of Ethiopia from 1930 to 1962

- Itege
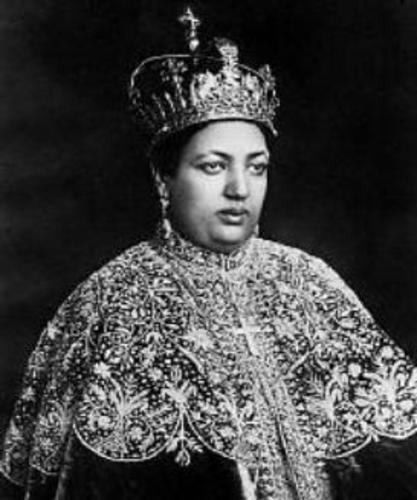

Empress consort of Ethiopia
- Tenure: 2 April 1930 – 15 February 1962
- Coronation: 2 November 1930
- Born: 25 March 1889; Ambassel, Bete Amhara, Ethiopian Empire (now South Wollo, Amhara Region, Ethiopia)
- Died: 15 February 1962 (aged 72); Addis Ababa, Ethiopian Empire
- Burial: Holy Trinity Cathedral, Addis Ababa, Ethiopia
- Spouse: Dejazmach Ali Mohammed (div.); Dejazmach Amede Ali Aba-Deyas (died); Ras Leul Sagad; Haile Selassie (m. 1911)
- Issue: Woizero Belaynesh Ali; Jantirar Asfaw Ali; Woizero Desta Amede; Jantirar Gebregziabiher Amede; Princess Tenagnework; Asfaw Wossen; Princess Zenebework; Princess Tsehai; Prince Makonnen; Prince Sahle Selassie
Names
- Walatta Giyorgis; Baptismal name
- Dynasty: House of Solomon
- Father: Asfaw, Jantirar of Ambassel
- Mother: Woizero Sehin Mikael of Wollo
- Religion: Ethiopian Orthodox Tewahedo

Menen Asfaw (baptismal name: Walatta Giyorgis; 25 March 1889 – 15 February 1962) was Empress of Ethiopia as the wife of Emperor Haile Selassie.

== Family ==
Menen Asfaw was born in Ambassel, located in Wollo Province of Ethiopian Empire on 25 March 1889. She was the daughter of Asfaw, Jantirar of Ambassel and Woizero Sehin Mikael. Her mother was the daughter of the King Mikael of Wollo and her half-uncle was Lij Iyasu.

According to both published and unpublished reports, the then Woizero Menen Asfaw was first given in marriage by her family to the prominent Wollo nobleman, Dejazmach Ali Mohammed of Cherecha at a very young age, as was the prevailing custom. They had two children, a daughter, Woizero Belaynesh Ali, and a son, Jantirar Asfaw Ali. This first marriage ended in divorce, and her natal family then arranged for Woizero Menen to marry Dejazmach Amede Ali Aba-Deyas, another very prominent nobleman of Wollo. She bore her second husband two children as well, a daughter, Woizero Desta Amede, and a son, Jantirar Gebregziabiher Amede. Following the sudden death of her second husband, Woizero Menen's grandfather, Negus Mikael arranged her marriage to Ras Leul Sagad Atnaf Seged, a prominent Shewan nobleman, who was considerably older than Woizero Menen in late 1909 or early 1910. It is unclear whether Woizero Menen was married to the aged nobleman (and secured a divorce shortly afterwards to marry her royal groom) or whether there was only an engagement between them which was broken without ado.

Woizero Menen probably met Dejazmach Tafari Makonnen (later the Emperor Haile Selassie) at the home of her half-uncle, Lij Iyasu. The rapport between the two may have inspired Lij Iyasu to attempt to bind Dejazmach Tafari to him more firmly through marriage ties. He therefore terminated the arrangement (whether marriage or engagement) between Woizero Menen and Ras Leul Sagad, and sent her to Harar to marry Dejazmach Tafari Makonnen. Ras Leul Sagad apparently did not hold a grudge against Dejazmach Tafari for this circumstance, blaming it entirely on Lij Iyasu who had ordered it. Indeed, he was among the leaders who fought on the side of Dejazmach Tafari Makonnen in the Battle of Segale, and died in that battle.

== Empress consort ==
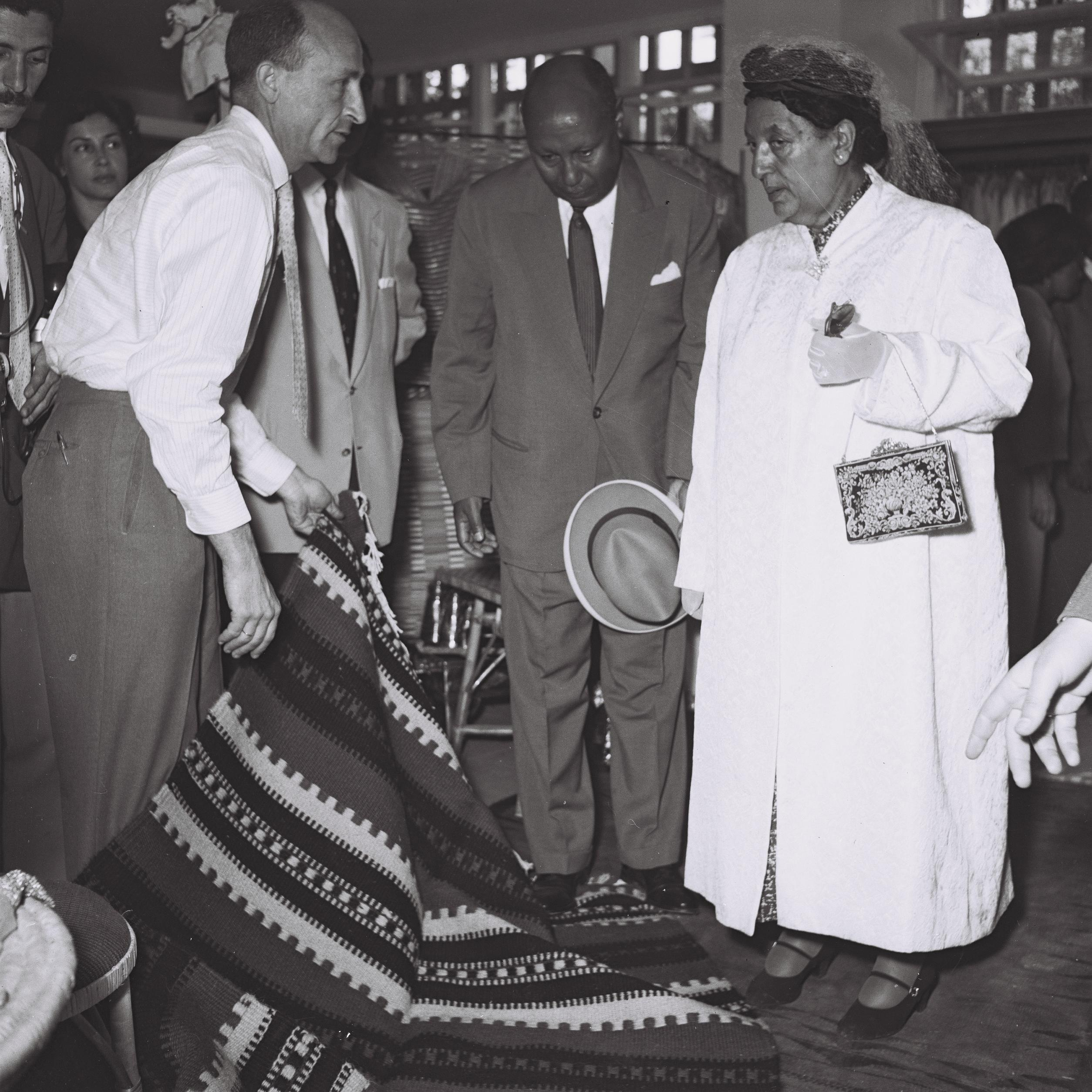
Empress Menen Asfaw on a private visit to Israel (6 May 1959)

The account given in the Autobiography of the Emperor, My Life and Ethiopia's Progress, mentions no previous marriage or children of Empress Menen and no such order by Iyasu, but states only that at the age of 20, they were married by their own mutual consent, and describes her as "a woman without any malice whatsoever". When Tafari Makonnen became Emperor of Ethiopia as Haile Selassie I, Menen Asfaw was crowned as Empress at his side. Empress Menen had no children by Ras Leulseged.

Empress Menen was active in promoting women's issues in Ethiopia, was Patroness of the Ethiopian Red Cross, and the Ethiopian Women's Charitable Organization. She was also patroness of the Jerusalem Society that arranged for pilgrimages to the Holy Land. She founded the Empress Menen School for Girls in Addis Ababa, the first all-girls school which had both boarding and day students. Girls from all over the Empire were brought to the school to receive a modern education, encouraged by the Empress who visited it often and presided over its graduation ceremonies. The Empress gave generously, as well as sponsored programs for poor, ill and disabled people. She was also a devoutly religious woman who did much to support the Ethiopian Orthodox Tewahedo Church. She built, renovated and endowed numerous churches in Ethiopia and in the Holy Land. Prominent among these are the St. Raguel Church in Addis Ababa's Merkato district, the Kidane Mehret (Our Lady Covenant of Mercy) Church on Mount Entoto, and the Holy Trinity Monastery on the banks of the River Jordan in the Holy Land. She gave generously from her personal funds towards the building of the new Cathedral of St. Mary of Zion at Axum, but did not live to see it completed and dedicated.

When the Empress was exiled from Ethiopia during the Italian occupation from 1936 to 1941, she made a pledge to the Virgin Mary at the Church of the Nativity in Bethlehem, promising to give her crown to the church if Ethiopia were liberated from occupation. The Empress made numerous pilgrimages to Holy Sites in then British-ruled Palestine, in Syria and in Lebanon, during her exile to pray for her occupied homeland. Following the return of Emperor Haile Selassie I and his family to Ethiopia in 1941, a replica of the crown was made for future Empresses, but the original crown that Empress Menen was crowned with at her husband's side in 1930 was sent to the Church of the Nativity in Bethlehem. Empress Menen, although often seen wearing a tiara at public events that called for it, would never again wear a full crown.

Empress Menen performed perfectly in the role of empress consort. In her public role she combined religious piety, concern for social causes, and support for development schemes with the majesty of her Imperial status. Outwardly she was the dutiful wife, visiting schools, churches, exhibitions and model farms, attending public and state events at her husband's side or by herself. She took no public stand on political or policy issues. Behind the scenes however, she was the Emperor's most trusted advisor, quietly offering advice on a whole range of issues. She avoided the publicly political role that her predecessor as Empress-consort, Empress Taytu Betul, had taken, which had caused deep resentment in government circles during the reign of Menelik II.

The Empress and some of her family were placed under house arrest briefly during the 1960 Imperial Guard coup attempt against her husband at her villa outside the Guenete Leul Palace grounds in northern Addis Ababa. Following the return of the Emperor and the crushing of the coup attempt, there was much speculation as to the conduct of the Crown Prince, who had been proclaimed monarch by the coup leaders. It was noted that the Crown Prince had accompanied his mother in a drive through the palace grounds, making stops at Imperial Guard posts to exchange pleasantries with the guards, on the night before the coup was launched. The ailing Empress had been urged to visit the posts by security officials, who were concerned about the soldiers' morale, and perhaps had an idea that something was brewing. The appearance of the Empress with the Crown Prince at her side may have been used by coup leaders as an indication to their followers that the Empress might sympathise with a movement that brought her favored son to the throne. It is extremely unlikely that either the Empress or the Prince had any idea of what was being plotted. However, a cloud of suspicion never left the Crown Prince, and the Empress was deeply saddened by this.

Following her death in 1962, the Empress was buried in the crypt of Holy Trinity Cathedral in Addis Ababa among the tombs of her children. Prime Minister Aklilu Habte-Wold delivered her eulogy paying tribute to her charity, her piety, and her role as advisor and helpmate to the Emperor, as well as her personal kindness and goodness. On the third day memorial and commemoration after the funeral, the Emperor himself paid tribute to his wife by saying that although the Prime Minister had aptly described what kind of person his late wife had been, he wanted to say that during their five decades of marriage, not once had it been necessary to have a third party mediate between him and his wife, and that their marriage had been one of peace and mutual support.

Later, the Emperor built a pair of grand sarcophagi in the north transept of Holy Trinity Cathedral's nave, in order to transfer his wife's remains there and eventually be buried at her side himself. But due to the revolution, the Emperor was not buried there after his death, and the Empress remained in her original tomb in the crypt. During the ceremonial burial of her husband's remains in November 2000, the remains of Empress Menen were also disinterred from the crypt tomb, and placed in the sarcophagus next to her husband in the nave of the cathedral, as he had originally intended.

As the consort of Emperor Haile Selassie, Empress Menen is highly venerated by members of the Rastafari movement. One name Rastas bestow on the Empress is "Queen Omega" which complements one of the names they give to the Emperor "King Alpha" (as in "Alpha and Omega"). The later name is used to refer to the Emperor in the original version of the reggae song Rivers of Babylon by The Melodians but all mention of him was removed from the more popular version by Boney M.

== Descendants ==
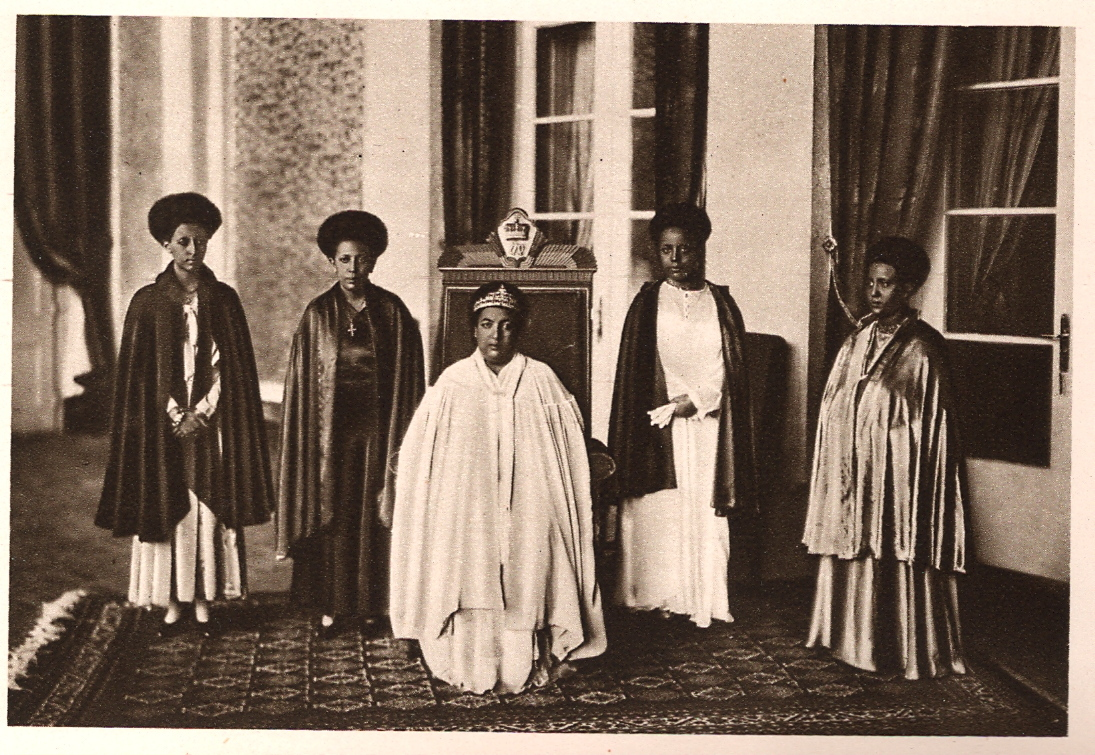
Empress Menen Asfaw seated in the centre and standing women from left to right are Princess Tsehai, Princess Tenagnework, and Princess Zenebework, her daughters, and on the far right is Princess Wolete Israel Seyoum, her daughter-in-law.

Empress Menen and Emperor Haile Selassie were the parents of six children: Princess Tenagnework, Crown Prince Asfaw Wossen, Princess Tsehai, Princess Zenebework, Prince Makonnen, and Prince Sahle Selassie.

Empress Mene was step-mother to the Emperor's eldest child Princess Romanework. Princess Romanework was the daughter of a previous union of the emperor with Woizero Woinitu Amede (also known as Woizero Altayech). The emperor's own autobiography mentions that his joy in 1941 following Ethiopia's liberation from Fascist Occupation was tempered by the grief of learning that his eldest child, Princess Romanework, had died under detention in Italy. Princess Romanework had been imprisoned along with her four sons, two of whom also died in Italy. The remaining two, Dejazmatch Samson Beyene Merid, and Dejazmatch Merid Beyene Merid, were repatriated from Italy after the war and were raised by the Emperor and Empress.

Prince Asfaw Wossen was first married to Princess Wolete Israel Seyoum and then following their divorce to Princess Medferiashwork Abebe. Prince Makonnen was married to Princess Sara Gizaw. Prince Sahle Selassie was married to Princess Mahisente Habte Mariam. Princess Romanework married Dejazmatch Beyene Merid. Princess Tenagnework first married Ras Desta Damtew, and after she was widowed later married Ras Andargachew Messai. Princess Zenebework married Dejazmatch Haile Selassie Gugsa. Princess Tsehai married Lt. General Abiye Abebe.

Descendants of Menen Asfaw
Name of Issue	Birth	Death	Spouse	Children
Princess Tenagnework	12 January 1912	6 April 2003	1st Ras Desta Damtew; 2nd Ras Andargatchew Messai	Princess Aida Desta; Prince Amha Desta; Princess Seble Desta; Rear Admiral Prince Iskinder Desta; Princess Hirut Desta; Princess Sophia Desta; Emebet Tsige Mariam Abebe Retta; Emebet Mentewab Andargatchew (died in childhood)
Crown Prince Asfaw Wossen	27 July 1916	17 February 1997	1st Princess Wolete Israel Seyoum; 2nd Princess Medferiashwork Abebe	Princess Ijigayehu; Princess Maryam Senna; Princess Sehin Azebe; Crown Prince Zera Yacob; Princess Sifrash Bizu
Princess Zenebework	25 July 1917	25 March 1934	Dejazmatch Haile Selassie Guglsa	
Princess Tsehai	13 October 1919	17 August 1942	Lt. General Abiye Abebe	
Prince Makonnen, Duke of Harar	16 October 1924	13 May 1957	Princess Sara Gizaw, Duchess of Harar	Prince Paul Wossen Seged Makonnen, Duke of Harar; Prince Mikael Makonnen; Prince Taffari Makonnen; Prince Dawit Makonnen (or Makonnen Makonnen); Prince Beede Mariam Makonnen
Prince Sahle Selassie	27 February 1932	24 April 1962	Princess Mahisente Habte Mariam	Prince Ermias Sahle Selassie

== Honours ==
=== National honours ===
- Ethiopia: Knight Grand Collar of the Order of Solomon
- Ethiopia: Knight Grand Cordon of the Order of the Seal of Solomon
- Ethiopia: Knight Grand Cordon with Collar of the Order of the Queen of Sheba
- Imperial Coronation Medal (1930).
- Refugee Medal (1944).
- Jubilee Medal (1955).

=== Foreign honours ===
- Member of the Royal Order of the Seraphim (Kingdom of Sweden, 19 December 1959).

== Ancestry ==
Ancestors of Menen Asfaw

2. Dejazmach Asfaw Mikael, Jantirar of Ambassel
1. Itege Menen Asfaw
12. Imam Ali Abba Bula
6. Negus Mikael of Zion
13. Woizero Getie
3. Woizero Sehin Mikael
14. Gabru
7. Woizero Fantaye
15. Hirut

Menen Asfaw House of Solomon Born: 25 March 1889 Died: 15 February 1962
Royal titles
Vacant Title last held by Taitu Bitul	Empress consort of Ethiopia; 2 April 1930 – 15 February 1962	Monarchy abolished
