= Haile Selassie Gugsa =

Ethiopian army officer (1907–1985)

- Dejazmatch of Ethiopia
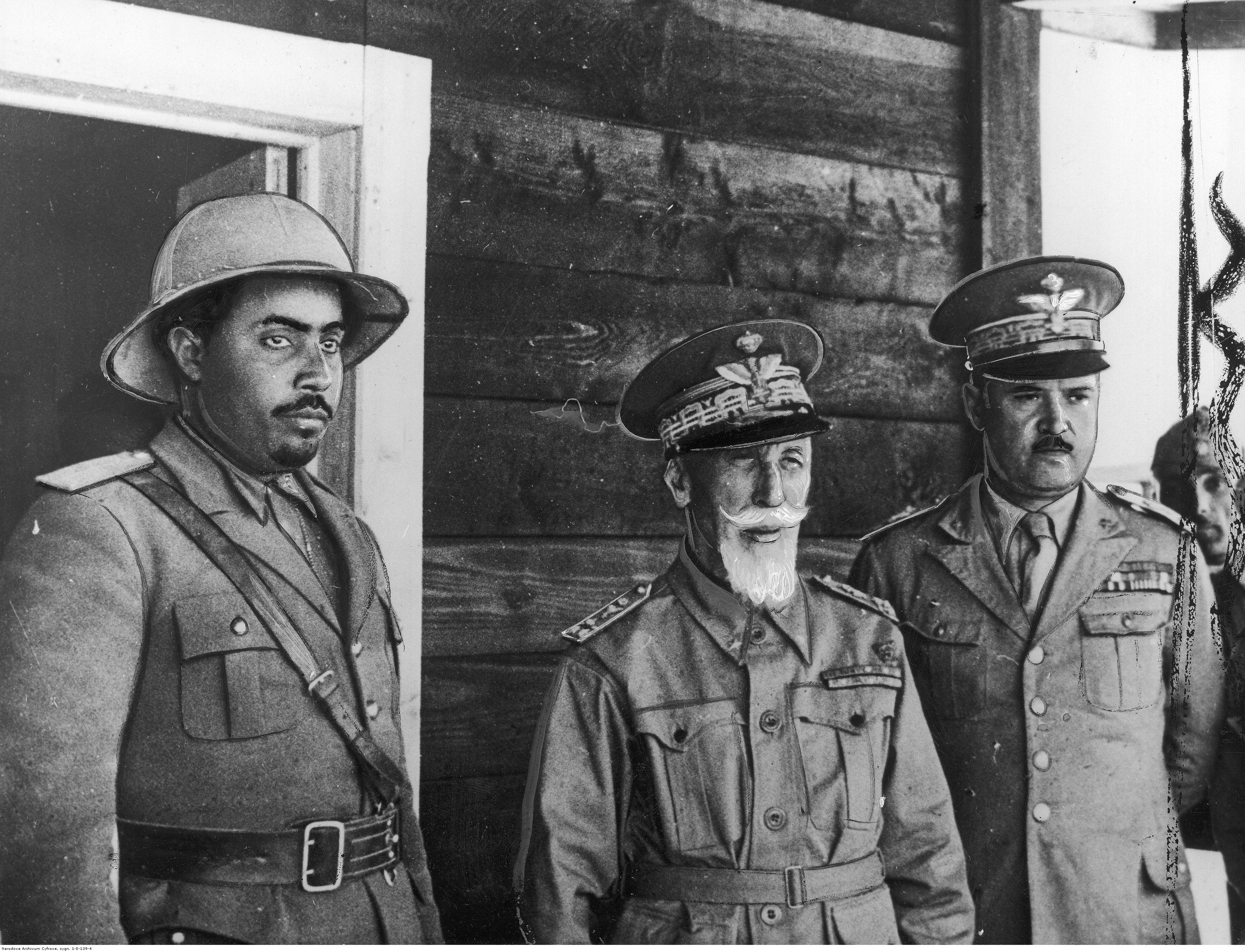
- Gugsa (left) with Italian General Emilio de Bono

Shum of Eastern Tigray
- Reign: 1932-1935
- Predecessor: Gugsa Araya Selassie
- Born: 1907; Tigray, Ethiopian Empire
- Died: 1985 (aged 77–78); Ambo, Ethiopia
- Burial: Holy Trinity Cathedral
- Spouse: Princess Zenebework
- House: House of Solomon
- Father: Leul Ras Gugsa Araya Selassie
- Religion: Oriental Orthodox Christianity

Haile Selassie Gugsa CBE (1907–1985) was an Ethiopian army commander and member of the Imperial family from Tigray. He is known for siding with Italy instead of the Ethiopian Empire during the Second Italo-Ethiopian War and becoming a fascist collaborator.

== Biography ==
Haile Selassie Gugsa was the son of Leul (Note: Roughly equivalent to Prince.) Ras (Note: Roughly equivalent to Duke.) Gugsa Araya Selassie. Gugsa Araya Selassie was the Shum (Note: Roughly equivalent to Governor.) of eastern Tigray Province as well as the great grandson of Emperor Yohannes IV.

=== Shum of eastern Tigray ===
In April 1932, Gugsa Araya Selassie died and Haile Selassie Gugsa replaced him as Shum of eastern Tigray with the title of Dejazmatch.

On 15 June 1932, Dejazmatch Haile Selassie Gugsa married Leult (Note: Roughly equivalent to Princess.) Zenebework Haile Selassie, Emperor Haile Selassie's second daughter. He was about 25 years old and she was not quite 14 years old. Leult Zenebework died in 1934. Relations between Emperor Haile Selassie and Dejazmatch Haile Selassie Gugsa became quite cold after this. The strain between them was especially apparent when the Emperor insisted on bringing his daughter's body back to Addis Ababa for burial rather than allowing her husband to bury her in the capital of eastern Tigray, Mek'ele. This was a clear sign of Emperor Haile Selassie's unhappiness with his son-in-law. Dejazmach Haile Selassie on his part was very bitter that he was not elevated to the titles of Leul and Ras which had been held by his father before him, and were held by his rival Seyum Mengesha of western Tigray.

At the same time as the marriage of Haile Selassie Gugsa to Zenebework Haile Selassie, Crown Prince Asfaw Wossen married Leult Wolete Israel Seyum, the daughter of Ras Seyum Mangasha of western Tigray Province. He was 16 years old and she was about 26 years old. The two marriages were meant to cement ties between the reigning Shoa branch of the Imperial Ethiopian dynasty with both rival sides of the Tigrean branch of the dynasty. The death of Princess Zenebework and the chill in relations between Haile Selassie Gugsa and Emperor Haile Selassie signalled the failure of this policy at least with the Eastern Tigrean branch of the dynasty.

=== Italo-Ethiopian War ===
Gugsa pictured in November 1935

On 3 October 1935, as Dejazmatch, (Note: Roughly equivalent to Commander of the Gate.) Haile Selassie Gugsa was the commander in the Mek'ele sector when the Italians invaded Ethiopia. As the Italians advanced, Emperor Haile Selassie ordered Ras Seyum Mangasha, the Commander of the Ethiopian Army of Tigre, to withdraw a day's march away from the Mareb River. Later, the Emperor ordered Ras Seyum to move back fifty-five miles from the border. Dejazmach Haile Selassie Gugsa, who was also in the area, was ordered to move back thirty-five miles. This was to demonstrate to the League of Nations that Italy was clearly the aggressor.

==== Betrayal ====
On 10 October, Haile Selassie Gugsa went over to the advancing Italians and announced his submission to Italian rule. The Italians immediately released photographs of Haile Selassie Gugsa participating in war councils with the Italian commander on the northern front, General de Bono. Furious Ethiopian patriots in Mek'ele promptly set fire to Dejazmach Haile Selassie Gugsa's home in the town. On 8 November, Mek'ele fell.

Some sources indicate that Haile Selassie Gugsa and his forces played an active part in aiding the Italian invasion. Other sources indicate his men were soon disarmed. Either way, Haile Selassie Gugsa remained loyal to the Italians who, at a minimum, used him for propaganda purposes during the balance of the invasion and during the five years of occupation. He was honoured by the Italians with the title of Ras which had been denied him by Emperor Haile Selassie, as well as an Italian pension, and recognition as the senior Tigrean prince over his rival Seyoum Mengesha.

=== Italian East Africa ===
In May 1938, Haile Selassie Gugsa was in Italy to welcome German dictator Adolf Hitler when the Nazi leader paid a state visit to King Victor Emmanuel III. Hitler was visiting at the invitation of the Italian dictator Benito Mussolini in Rome. Haile Selassie Gugsa watched as Mussolini's son, Bruno, led a squadron of twenty-eight bombers that sank two 23,000-ton empty freighters in the Tyrrhenian Sea.

By 27 September 1939, during the Feast of Maskal in Addis Ababa, Ras Haile Selassie Gugsa, Ras Hailu Tekle Haymanot, and Ras Seyum Mangasha sat with Amedeo, 3rd Duke of Aosta, the Viceroy and Governor General of Italian East Africa (Africa Orientale Italiana, or AOI). All three Ethiopian leaders had submitted to Italian control of what had been their homeland and what was now the AOI colony.

=== Liberation of Ethiopia ===
In 1941, towards the end of the liberation of Italian East Africa by British, Commonwealth, and Ethiopian Arbegnoch (Note: Equivalent to Ethiopian patriot.) forces, Haile Selassie Gugsa was temporarily placed in power in Tigray by the British. British Brigadier Maurice Stanley Lush, Deputy Chief Political Officer for Ethiopia, placed him back in command of eastern Tigray Province, with the intention of separating Tigray from Ethiopia, joining it to Eritrea and establishing a new "Greater Tigray/Tigrign" monarchy under either Haile Selassie Gugsa or Ras Seyum Mangasha. This plan had the support of many British colonial officers, but not of the British High Command nor of the British government, and Ras Seyum proved to be cold towards any plan of dismembering the Ethiopian Empire. The Lush group had hoped that Haile Selassie Gugsa would be more accommodating. However, Haile Selassie Gugsa was soon caught corresponding with the Italians. As a result, the British took him into custody and kept him first in British held Asmara. The government of Emperor Haile Selassie I approached the British administration and listed the crimes and treason of Haile Selassie Gugsa and requested his extradition. The British indicated that they would extradite him only after obtaining a promise that his punishment would not include death. However, the British ultimately removed Haile Selassie Gugsa from Asmara and sent him to the Seychelles for safe keeping.

==== Life sentence ====
In 1946, after continued requests for extradition, Haile Selassie Gugsa was returned to the Ethiopians. In 1947, he stood trial and was declared a fascist collaborator and a traitor. Haile Selassie Gugsa then threw himself on the mercy of the Emperor. As a result, his death sentence was commuted to life imprisonment. He was placed under house arrest at Gore, and later at Ambo for twenty-eight years. His Italian-supplied honorific title of Ras was not recognised and he reverted to his old title of Dejazmach.

In 1947, eastern Tigray was incorporated into western Tigray and was governed by Ras Seyum Mangasha as hereditary prince of all Tigray. Dejazmach Haile Selassie Gugsa and his side of the family of Emperor Yohannes IV fell from grace. They no longer enjoyed favour either from the Emperor in Addis Ababa or from Ras Seyum Mangasha in Tigray.

=== The Derg and Death ===
In 1974, the Derg toppled the Ethiopian monarchy and Dejazmach Haile Selassie Gugsa was freed. However, even after he was released, the Derg continued to regard him as a fascist collaborator and as a traitor to his country. Haile Selassie Gugsa remained under effective house arrest at Ambo in western Ethiopia from that point on although technically no longer a state prisoner. Haile Selassie Gugsa died in early 1985 for unknown causes. It is not completely excluded that the Derg contributed to his demise, as in that period a number of old fascist collaborators died under unclear circumstances across Ethiopia. Those deaths were linked to a possible retaliation against Italy for its support on Siad Barre's Somali Democratic Republic regime.

== See also ==
- Monarchies of Ethiopia
- Ethiopian aristocratic and court titles
- Desta Damtew – Another son-in-law of Haile Selassie
- Beyene Merid – Another son-in-law of Haile Selassie

== Notes ==
Footnotes

Citations
