= Prince Makonnen =

Second child of Emperor Haile Selassie (1924–1957)

- Duke of Harar
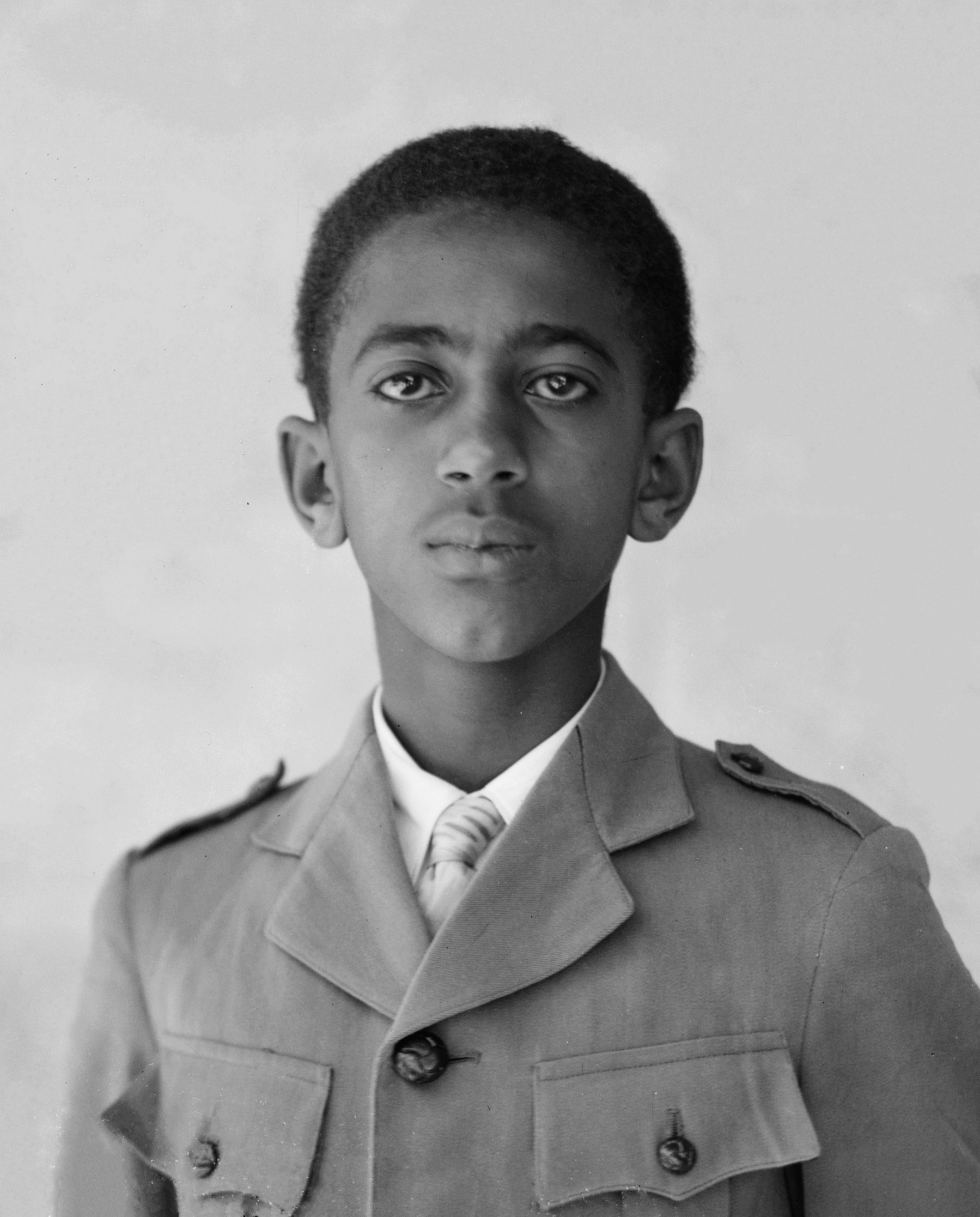
- Born: 16 October 1924; Addis Ababa, Ethiopian Empire
- Died: 13 May 1957 (aged 32); Addis Ababa, Ethiopian Empire
- Burial: Holy Trinity Cathedral
- Spouse: Sara Gizaw
- Issue: Prince Paul Wossen, Duke of Harar; Prince Mikael, Duke of Harar; Prince Dawit; Prince Taffari; Prince Beede Mariam
Names
- Araya Yohannes
- Dynasty: House of Solomon (Shewan Branch)
- Father: Haile Selassie
- Mother: Menen Asfaw
- Religion: Ethiopian Orthodox Tewahedo

Prince Makonnen Haile Selassie, Duke of Harar (baptismal name: Araya Yohannes; 16 October 1924 – 13 May 1957) was the second son, and second-youngest child, of Emperor Haile Selassie of Ethiopia and Empress Menen Asfaw. He was made Mesfin (or Duke) of Harar upon the coronation of his parents in 1930.

== Prince Makonnen's family ==
Prince Makonnen was married to Sara Gizaw, who also became a Princess and the Duchess of Harar. Together they had six sons, all of whom are entitled to the style of Imperial Highness:

- Prince (Leul) Paul Wossen Seged, Duke of Harar (Addis Ababa, 21 August 1947 – 10 November 2021). Married 19 March 1995 to Connie Jo Quave (b. 30 September 1957, formerly Mrs. Wilbun), a Californian paralegal.
- Prince (Leul) Mikael, Duke of Harar (b. Addis Ababa, 30 January 1950). Married to Princess Asrat Amaha Yesus.
- Prince (Leul) Dawit (b. Addis Ababa, 30 January 1952 – d. Nyon, Switzerland, 26 August 1989). Married 16 April 1974 to Princess Adey-Abeba Imru Makonnen (b. 11 March 1951, elder daughter of H.E. Lij Imru Zelleke, Ambassador to Germany and Minister of State, and his wife Woizero Martha Nasibu, later Marchesa Francesco Tortora Brayda di Belvedere, daughter of H.E. General Ras Nasibu Zamanuel, Minister of War), and had two sons:
  - Prince (Leul) Yokshan Dawit Makonnen (b. Vero Beach, Florida, 8 February 1978)
  - Prince (Leul) Joel Dawit Makonnen (b. Rome, 5 May 1982). Married 9 September 2017 to Ariana Austin (b. Washington, 6 January 1986)
- Prince (Leul) Fileppos Tafari Makonnen (Prince Philip Makonnen) (b. Addis Ababa, 15 June 1954). Educ in the UK, living in USA. Married 19 July 1990 to Princess Aster Abitow Makonnen (b. Addis Ababa, 1 February 1968), and had two sons and one daughter:
  - Princess (Leult) Edna Tafari Makonnen (b. 5 January 1991). Married 30 April 2022 to Jamal Robinson. They have one child:
    - Eliana Rose Robinson (b. 17 July 2025)
  - Prince (Leul) Dawit Tafari Makonnen (b. Fort Wayne, Indiana, 1992)
  - Prince (Leul) Isayas Tafari Makonnen (b. Toronto, 1998)
- Prince (Leul) Beede Mariam (b. Addis Ababa, 30 March 1957). Married to Princess Mahlet Zawdneh and had two daughters:
  - Princess (Leult) Blaine Be'eda Mariam (b. Toronto, ON, 1998)
  - Princess (Leilt) Helina Beedemariam (b. Toronto, ON)

In addition, Prince Makonnen also had a natural daughter, Woizero Meheret Makonnen, born before 1945.

In 1974, with the overthrow of the Ethiopian monarchy, the widowed Duchess of Harar and her sons were all placed under detention, with the exception of Prince Taffari who was abroad at school and Prince David Makonnen who was attending advanced military training in the United States. After a long and harsh imprisonment, Princess Sara was released by the Derg regime along with the other female members of the Imperial family in 1989. A year later, her sons were also released from their imprisonment. Days before their release, Prince Dawit Makonnen died at Geneva in Switzerland.

After the fall of the Derg regime, Princess Sara and her sons were allowed to travel abroad. And after a number of years living in London, they returned to live in Addis Ababa. The Duchess of Harar was prominent at the Imperial funerals held for her brother-in-law, the Crown Prince Asfaw Wossen (also known as Emperor-in-Exile Amha Selassie I), the Emperor Haile Selassie I, and the funeral for Princess Tenagnework. She died in 2019.

== Death ==
It was widely believed that Emperor Haile Selassie favoured the Duke of Harar over all his other children, and it was even rumoured that the Emperor even considered naming Makonnen as his heir, instead of his liberal elder son, Crown Prince Asfaw Wossen. However, Prince Makonnen died in a car crash in 1957 on his way to the resort town of Nazreth from Debre Zeyit, east of Addis Ababa. He was buried in the crypt of Holy Trinity Cathedral in Addis Ababa. Some believe the car crash was an assassination plot by the Prince's political enemies. He was 32 years old at the time of his death.

== Ancestry ==
Ancestors of Prince Makonnen

8. Dejazmach Wolde Mikael Wolde Malakot
4. Ras Mäkonnen Wäldä-Mika'él
9. Immabet Tenagnework Sahle Selassie
2. Emperor Haile Selassie I
10. Dejazmach Ali Abba Jifar
5. Woizero Yeshimebet Ali
11. Immabet-Hoy Walatta Ihata Giyorgis Yimeru
1. Prince Makonnen of Ethiopia
6. Dejazmach Asfaw Mikael, Jantirar of Ambassel
3. Itege Menen Asfaw
14. Negus Mikael
7. Woizero Sehin Mikael
15. Woizero Fantaye
