= Gishen Debre Kerbe =

Monastery in South Wollo Zone, Amhara Region, Ethiopia

Gishen Debre Kerbe Mariam
- ግሸን ደብረ ከርቤ
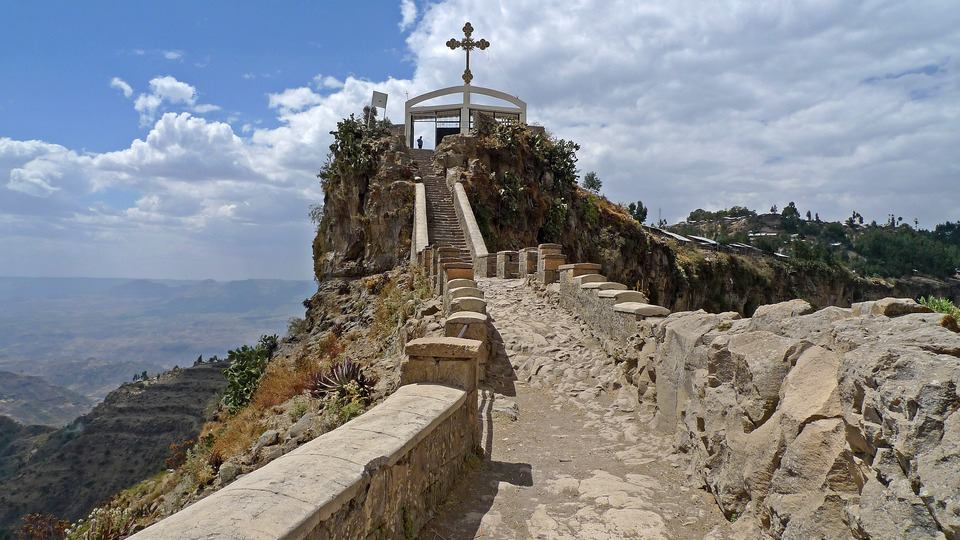
- Mountain Amba Geshen

- Location within Ethiopia
- Interactive map of Gishen Debre Kerbe Mariam

Monastery information
- Other names: Debre Kerbe; Debre Gishen
- Denomination: Ethiopian Orthodox Tewahedo Church
- Established: 5th century
- Dedication: True Cross
- Controlled churches: Gishen Maryam; Gishen Gabriel; Gishen Michael; Gishen, God the Holy Father

People
- Founder: Kaleb
- Important associated figures: Nine Saints; Yekuno Amlak; Zara Yaqob

Site
- Location: Ambassel, South Wollo Zone, Amhara Region
- Country: Ethiopia
- Coordinates: 11.520433°N 39.360672°E
- Public access: Yes

Gishen Debre Kerbe Mariam (Ge'ez: ግሸን ደብረ ከርቤ), also simply known as Debre Kerbe or Debre Gishen or Gishen Mariam, is an Ethiopian Orthodox Tewahedo Church monastery located in Ambassel woreda, in South Wollo Zone, Amhara Region, Ethiopia, 483 kilometers north of Addis Ababa. It was founded by Aksumite king Kaleb in the 5th century with the auspice of Nine Saints from Byzantine Empire.

According to tradition, Gishen Debre Kerbe was one of the Ethiopian Orthodox Churches to receive piece of True Cross transported through Saint Helena of Constantinople, through which Meskel festival is the basis festivity of the church. According to some manuscripts of Ethiopian Orthodox, the piece of True Cross was brought by Emperor Zara Yaqob with whom Jesus crucified to "Gishen Amba" and buried under the church of God. The church is known for receiving mass pilgrimages per year. According to the World Health Organization (WHO) in 2010, the monastery received 350,000–500,000 pilgrims and tourists per each year.

== Church features ==
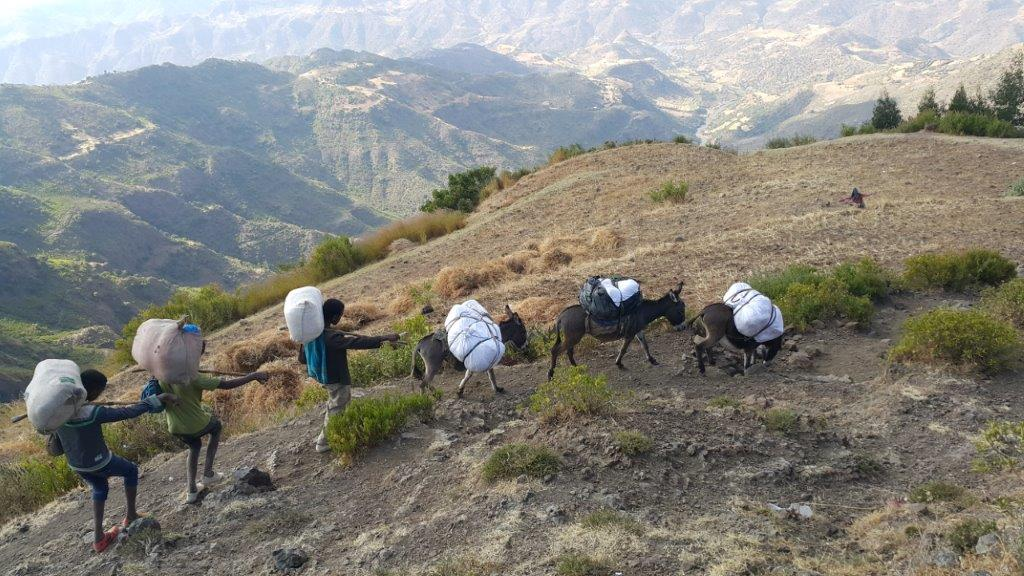
Workmen transporting goods via donkeys through Gishen Debre Kerbe mountain steep

Gishen Mariam is located 483 kilometers north of Addis Ababa in South Wollo Zone, and 3,019 meters above sea level in Ambassel woreda. It has an area of 26 hectares, and lies on mountainous region surrounded by hills.

According to the World Health Organization (WHO) report in 2010, the church received 350,000–500,000 pilgrims and tourists per each year.

== Church description ==
The church was founded in the 5th century by Aksumite ruler Kaleb with auspice of Nine Saints and has unique features, such as the fragment of the Original True Cross buried underneath the church. Gishen was masculine monastery until the reign of Emperor Yekuno Amlak who built Saint Mary Church in order to access Gishen for both sexes. According to tradition, Empress Helena of Constantinople lit incense and prayed for assistance to guide her. The smoke drifted toward the direction of the True Cross. After digging the ground, she found three Crosses, and delivered the piece through Churches, with one of whom is Gishen Mariam. Thus, the church holds a volume of book which records the story of True Cross of Christ and how was transported to the church, along with Makdala escarpments, and Lake Kayke.

The monastery is known as "Debre Gishen", and has four churches, Gishen Maryam, Saint Gabriel, Saint Michael, and God, the Holy Father (Egziabher Ab). According to manuscripts of the Ethiopian Orthodox Church, Emperor Zara Yaqob (r. 1434–1468) brought one of the True Cross piece on which Jesus Christ was crucified to "Gishen Amba" and buried under the church of God. The Ethiopian Orthodox celebrates Meskel on 27 September (28 September in leap year) and the lodging of the pieces of the True Cross at Gishen Debre Kerbe on 1 October. The church celebrates the festival on the grounds of historical background and holds it as her power and seal of salvation.
