= Battle of Segale =

1916 civil conflict in the Ethiopian Empire

- Part of Palace Coup against Lij Iyasu
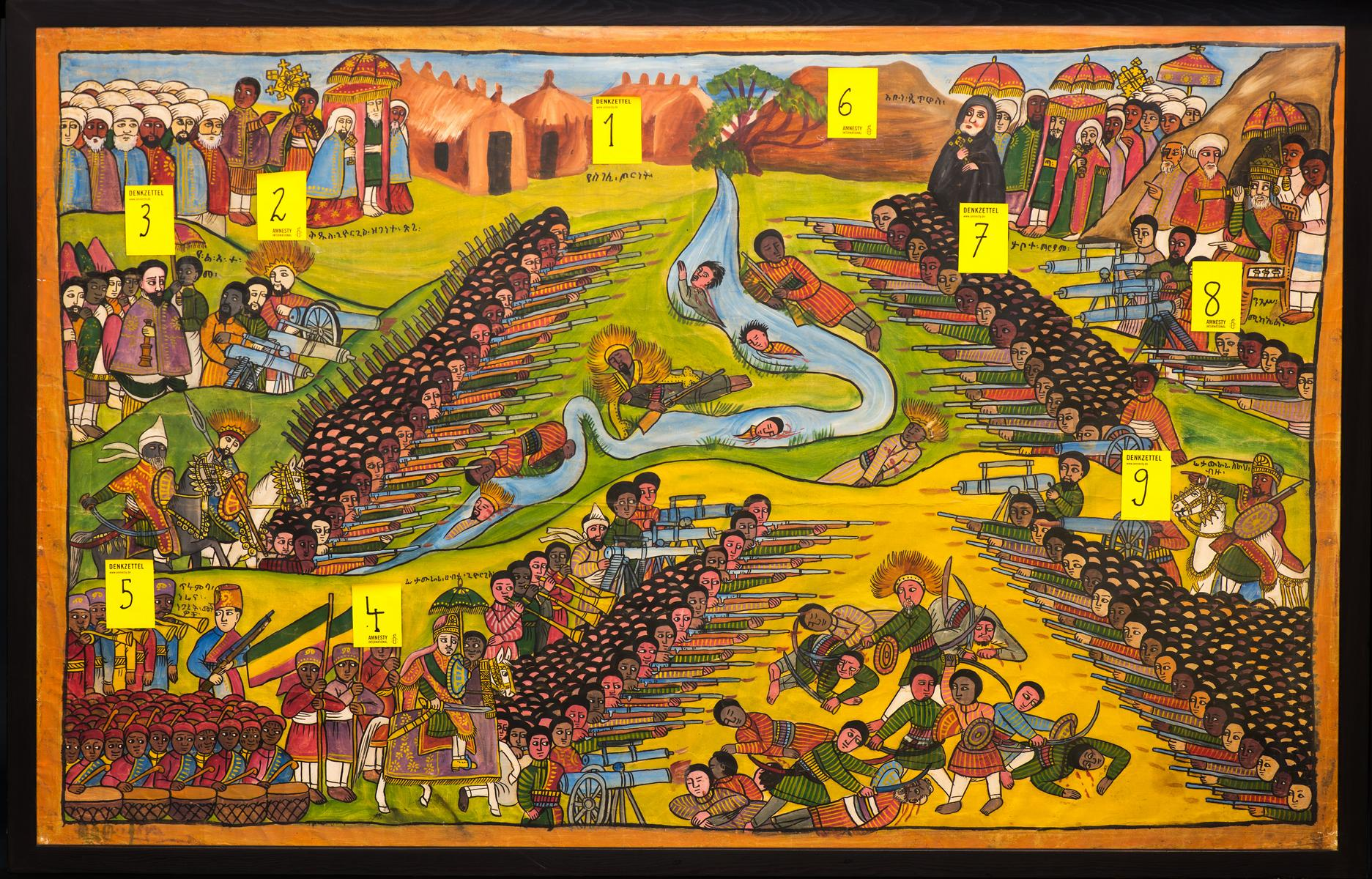
Date	27 October 1916; 109 years ago
Location	Segale, 40 miles north of Addis Ababa
Result	Zewditu loyalist victory

Belligerents
Loyalists to Zewditu	Loyalists to Lij Iyasu

Commanders and leaders
Fitawrari Habte Giyorgis Ras Kebede Mengesha	Negus Mikael of Wollo

Strength
120,000	80,000

The Battle of Segale was a civil conflict in the Ethiopian Empire between the supporters of Empress regent Zewditu and Lij Iyasu on 27 October 1916, and resulted in victory for Zewditu. Paul B. Henze states that "Segale was Ethiopia's greatest battle since Adwa" (1896).

== Background ==
The nobility of Ethiopia had grown discontent with the rule of Lij Iyasu. After Iyasu failed to observe the important religious holiday of Meskel in the capital Addis Ababa and instead remained in the predominantly Muslim city of Harar, the nobility decided to strike. A number of nobles met 17 days later on 27 September, and convinced Abuna Mattewos to excommunicate Iyasu on the accusation that he converted to Islam, then announced on the steps of the Palace that Iyasu had been deposed in favor of Zewditu.

The plotters had sent orders to Harar that Iyasu was to be arrested, which could not be carried out. Sources dispute exactly what Lij Iyasu's did next. Bahru Zewde states that Iyasu started to march on Addis Ababa, but his advance was blocked at Mieso by 15,000 soldiers, and he fled into the Afar desert. Historian Harold G. Marcus, drawing on the reports filed by the European diplomats, states that instead Lij Iyasu had sent one force towards the capital under Dejazmach Gebre, and another, raised from loyal Afars and Somalis, to secure Dire Dawa; the Dejazmach went over to the opposing army and the Afars and Somalis deserted before reaching the city, and Iyasu fled with his bodyguard to Jijiga. Aleqa Gebre Igziabiher Elyas's narrative supports Marcus in that Iyasu fled to the desert where his Afar supporters helped him. In either case, Harar failed him as a base of support and he took refuge in the desert.

== Battle ==
His father and most important supporter, Negus Mikael of Wollo, was slow to march south upon the capital and restore Iyasu to the throne, not moving until the middle of October. Yet, when he did, the Negus crushed the troops sent against him. On 18 October, Negus Mikael's troops defeated an advance force of 11,000 men in Menz and killed their leader, Ras Lul Seged. Under the command of the regent Ras Tafari (the future Emperor Haile Selassie) and Fitawrari Habte Giyorgis, a force estimated to number between 25,000 and 35,000 marched north to do battle and the two armies came to face each other at Segale on the 22nd.

Afterwards, the then Ras Tafari stated that because "bloodshed among Ethiopians themselves is extremely saddening, I arranged that monks from the monasteries of Debre Libanos and Zequala ... [should] come with their crosses to request Negus Mikael to go back to Wollo without making war." Negus Mikael is said to have simply arrested these emissaries, ignoring their message.

Negus Mikael opened the battle early in the morning, but his artillery was put out of commission by his opponent and his machine-gunners ran out of ammunition. Aleqa Gebre-Igziabiher Elyas, drawing from eyewitness accounts, describes the battle opening with a charge of Negus Mikael's infantry and cavalry. However, the Shewan troops had been trained to fire their rifles in rows and from the prone position, allowing them to fire in quick succession "and felled [them] like leaves." Then the Shewans attacked, "and they pursued the army of Wello and took captives. And particularly the Shewan cavalry went from valley to valley" and overran Negus Mikael's camp." At 3:25 pm, one of the Shewan officers telephoned to the capital that they had won the battle. "The dead are very numerous on both sides." Aleqa Gebre-Igziabiher Elyas explains one cause for this bloodshed was that the two sides did not differ in dress or insignia, and could only distinguish each other by their passwords, which were not always well known to the soldiers. Bahru Zewde succinctly comments: "The Wallo forces were defeated. Negus Mikael was captured. The coup [of 27 September] was now sanctioned by blood."

== Aftermath ==
Negus Mikael defended himself in his corral until his defeat was undeniable, when he surrendered. Amnesty was offered to the soldiers from the losing side, provided that they swear loyalty to the new Empress. However, two of Negus Mikael's chief lieutenants escaped the battle unvanquished: Ras Yimer, who managed to rally some of the defeated army and lead them to Dessie; and Fitawrari Sirah Bizu, who discarded his weapons and battle-dress and slipped from the battlefield in the garb of a sick priest with a single servant, and met up with Ras Yimer in Dessie. Dejazmach Gebre Igziabiher who had been a lukewarm supporter of Negus Mikael sat out the battle, but when the Negus surrendered and he attempted to flee back to Welo, the peasants of Aliyu Amba ambushed and killed him.

As for the deposed Lij Iyasu, he had just reached Ankober by the time the battle ended; he led his small army of 6,000 into the desert back to Dessie, arriving there 8 November and joining with Ras Yimer and Fitawrari Sirah Bizu. When the Imperial army reached that town 10 December, he fled further north to the old stronghold of Amba Mariam, further away from the center of power. "Iyasu could not even slow down the consolidation of the new government," notes Harold Marcus.
