= Jantirar =

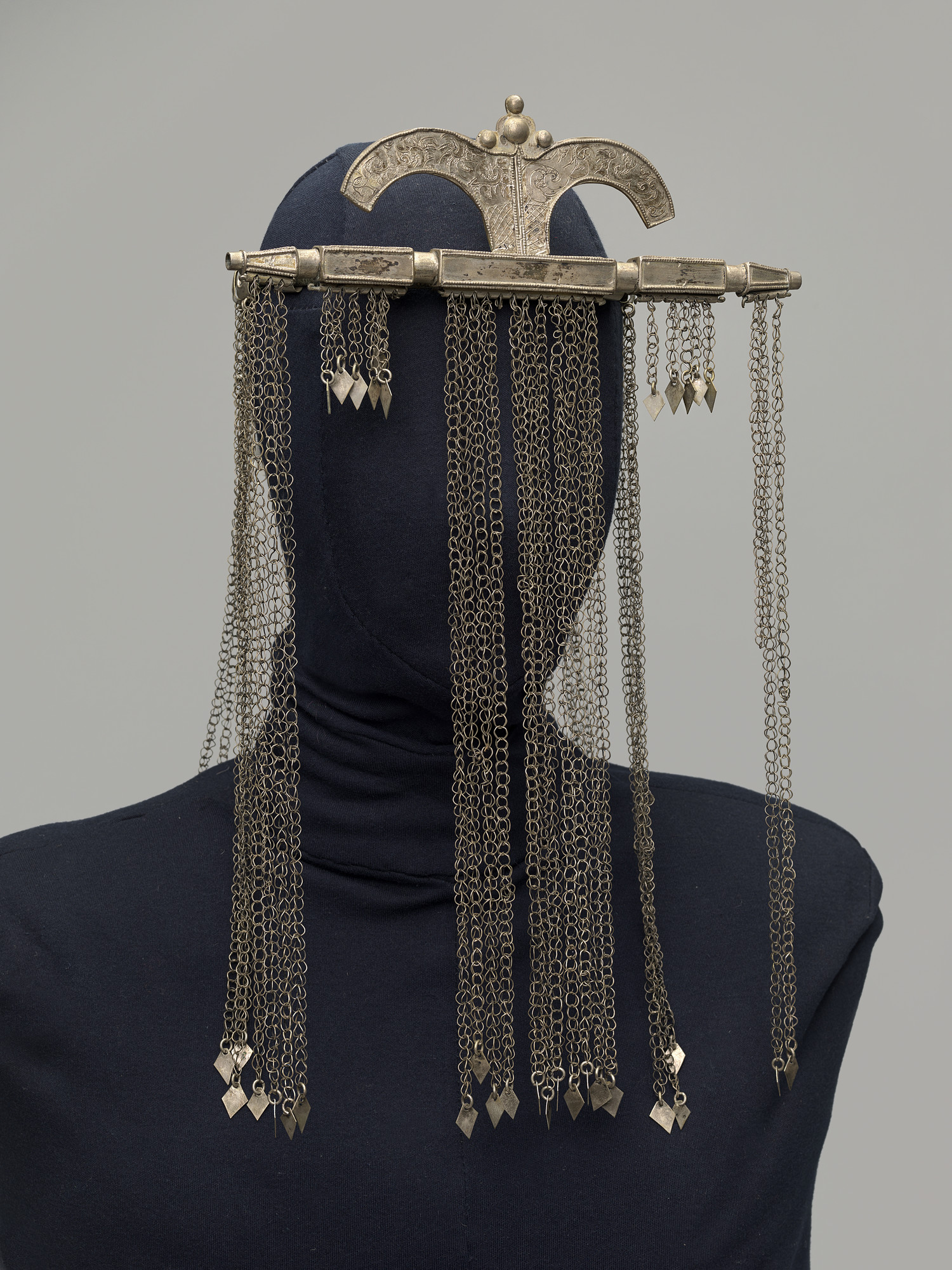
The "Akodama," a headdress worn by the noblemen of Shewa and Wollo

Jantirar (Amharic: ጃንጥራር) was a title of the Ethiopian Empire given to the ruler of Amba Geshen.

== Overview ==
Jantirar is borne historically by the head of the family holding the mountain fortress of Ambassel in Ethiopia; similar to Wagshum, the hereditary ruler of the province of Wag, and unlike other aristocratic titles like meridazmach or ras. While that artistocratic family is said to be one of the most noble in Ethiopian history, they never ruled any larger realm than their own district. Menen Asfaw, empress consort of Haile Selassie, was a daughter of Jantirar Asfaw.

The meaning of the title Jantirar makes it unique. The element Jan is the same as the Jan in Janhoye or "Jan Amora", meaning "great" but often translated as "royal" and another word used to refer to the Emperor of Ethiopia. Also, both words after Jan have almost similar meaning in Amharic. Hoye or hoyi can be roughly translated into "hear me, hear my call", while tirar is a form of Tira, which means "call" or "calling".

However, the claim that 'they never ruled any larger realm than their own district' can be challenged in many fronts. For example, while the mother of Yekuno Amlak was from Sagarat in the Dessie Zuria, his father came from the highlands of Ambassel. All the local folk histories and some remnants of the Kingdom of Aksum, even before the Zagwe dynasty appears in history (around Lake Hayq of Ambassel with a church that was founded in the 8th century), suggest that Ambassel and the immediate surrounding Amhara regions were well prepared to produce a king and a legend as it suits its kingdom. It is arguable that their Jantirar can not be so without some connection of their being the origin of Yekuno Amlak.
