= Mikael of Wollo =

Ethiopian army commander (1858–1918)

Ras Mikael of Wollo
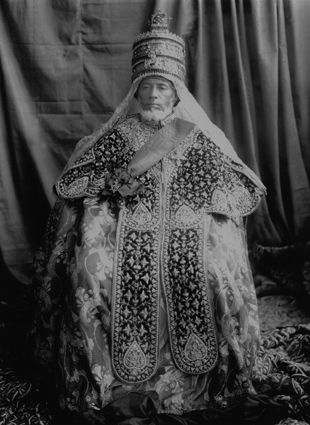

Ras of Wollo
- Monarchs: Yohannes IV; Menelik II

Negus of Abyssinia
- Monarch: Lij Iyasu

Personal details
- Born: Mohammed Ali; 1850 Wollo, Ethiopian Empire
- Died: 8 September 1918 (aged 67–68) Holeta, Shewa Province, Ethiopian Empire
- Children: Lij Iyasu, Woizero Sihin of Wollo, Ras Gebrehiwot
- Occupation: Military officer; diplomat; court official
- Religion: Ethiopian Orthodox Tewahedo prev. Islam

Military service
- Allegiance: Ethiopian Empire
- Battles/wars: First Italo-Ethiopian War: Battle of Adwa (1896); Battle of Segale (1916)

Negus Mikael of Wollo (born Mohammed Ali, 1850 – 8 September 1918), was an army commander and a member of the nobility of the Ethiopian Empire. He was the father of the "uncrowned" Emperor Lij Iyasu, and the grandfather of Empress Menen, wife of Emperor Haile Selassie. He changed his name to Mikael upon converting to Christianity.

Ras Mikael had a strong relationship with both Yohannes IV (who became his godfather) and Menelik II (who became his father-in-law).

Ras Mikael had played a pivotal role in Ethiopian history. His Wollo army was one of the most powerful in Northern Ethiopia, and the Wollo cavalry was renowned throughout the empire. Ras Michael fought with Emperor Yohannes in the Battle of Gallabat against the Mahdist Sudanese. Loyal to the end, he held the dying Yohannes in his arms. Ras Mikael also led the Wollo cavalry during the Battle of Adwa fighting together with Menelik II, Ras Mekonnen, Ras Mengesha and Negus Tekle Haimanot.

== Biography ==
=== Early career ===
Mohammed Ali was born in Wollo in 1850; his father was Imam Ali Abba Bula and his mother was Woizero Geyiti. He was born Muslim and descended from the Oromo rulers of Warra Himano. He learned French between 1870 and 1874 at a Marist Christian mission attached to the French embassy. At a young age, after studying at a madrasa at Tenta, Muhammad succeeded his father as the ruler of Warra Himano. He became close to Menelik II and supported him at his coronation. In 1874, Menelik appointed him as the governor of Wollo.

=== Conversion to Christianity ===
In the infamous "Council of Boru Meda," Emperor Yohannes forced Mohammed Ali and the Muslim aristocrats of Wollo to convert to Christianity within three months or renounce their positions. "Having concluded that Wollo was worth a mass," Marcus claims, "Mohammad Ali led his people to Christianity." Ali was baptized with the name "Mikael" and became a Ras (equivalent to "Duke"). Nevertheless, while some of the leaders of Wollo converted to Christianity, the vast majority of the Muslim populace of Wollo refused to convert and revolted. In Ifat province rebel leader Talha Jafar led an insurgency in 1879 which defeated Mikael's forces. As a consequence, Atse Yohannes campaigned throughout Wollo, massacring thousands of Wollo Muslims to break their resistance. Many Muslims from Wollo left for sanctuary in Metemma, Kingdom of Jimma, and the Emirate of Harar.

=== Baptism and marriage ===
Emperor Yohannes IV stood as his godfather at his baptism. Ras Mikael of Wollo, as he was now known, eventually married Shoaregga Menelik, (Note: Also spelled "Shewa Regga".) Menelik's natural daughter, becoming the third of his four wives.

Mikael founded Dessie, the first town in Wollo and its new capital. It is claimed that Ras Mikael became a deeply devout Ethiopian Orthodox Christian, and a dedicated builder of churches.

=== Battle of Adwa ===
In 1896, during the First Italo-Ethiopian War, Ras Mikael fought with Menelik and led the feared Wollo cavalry against the invading Italians at the Battle of Adwa. An Italian brigade began a fighting retreat towards the main Italian positions. However, the brigade inadvertently marched into a narrow valley where Mikael's cavalry slaughtered them while shouting "Reap! Reap!". The remains of the brigade's commander were never found.

=== Battle of Segale ===
Following Menelik's death in 1913, Mikael's son and Emperor Menelik's grandson, Lij Iyasu. Per Menelik's wishes, Ras Tessema Nadew became the Regent for Menelik's 18-year-old grandson. However, that same year, Tessema Nadew died. While Iyasu was now on his own, he was never fully accepted. More importantly, he was never formally crowned Emperor. However, on the instructions of Iyasu, his father Mikael was anointed Negus or king of Wollo and Tigray. Negus Mikael then became the power behind the throne.

During World War I, concerns arose over Iyasu's ties to the Central Powers, over his possible support for Mohammed Abdullah Hassan, and over his potential conversion to Islam. In response to these concerns, on 27 September 1916, Iyasu was deposed by a council of nobles and high clergy, and Mikael's sister-in-law, Woizero Zewditu, was pronounced Negiste Negest ("Queen of Kings") Zewditu I. Zewditu was another of Menelik's daughters, and at the same time that she was made Empress, the council also proclaimed as Regent and Heir to the Throne, young Ras Tafari Makonnen, the future Emperor Haile Selassie I. The new Regent and Heir Ras Tafari was married to Woizero (later Empress) Menen Asfaw, a granddaughter of Negus Mikael by his daughter Woizero Sehin Mikael.

Negus Mikael's response to Iyasu being deposed was swift. On 7 October 1916, Mikael set out from Wollo at the head of an army of 80,000 men to invade Shewa and to reinstate his son; Iyasu would join him there with an army of his own. On 27 October, Negus Mikael confronted the main body of the forces supporting Zewditu in the Battle of Segale. Mikael attacked first, but ammunition for his machine guns ran out early and his artillery was silenced quickly. His infantry and cavalry assaults ran directly into the murderous fire of an enemy ready for his attacks. Iyasu was detoured on his way to the battlefield and arrived too late to help. He was only able to see that his father was defeated, and fled the battlefield and went into hiding. Mikael was captured and put under the supervision of Fitawrari ("Commander of the Vanguard") Habte Giyorgis, who confined him on an island in Lake Chabo in Gurageland. After two and a half years, Mikael successfully petitioned to Empress Zewditu to be moved from the island, and he was put under house arrest at Holeta Genet at a former country home of the late Emperor Menelik II, where he died six months later. As the grandfather of the wife of the Crown Prince, Negus Mikael was given full mourning by the royal court.

=== Death and interment ===
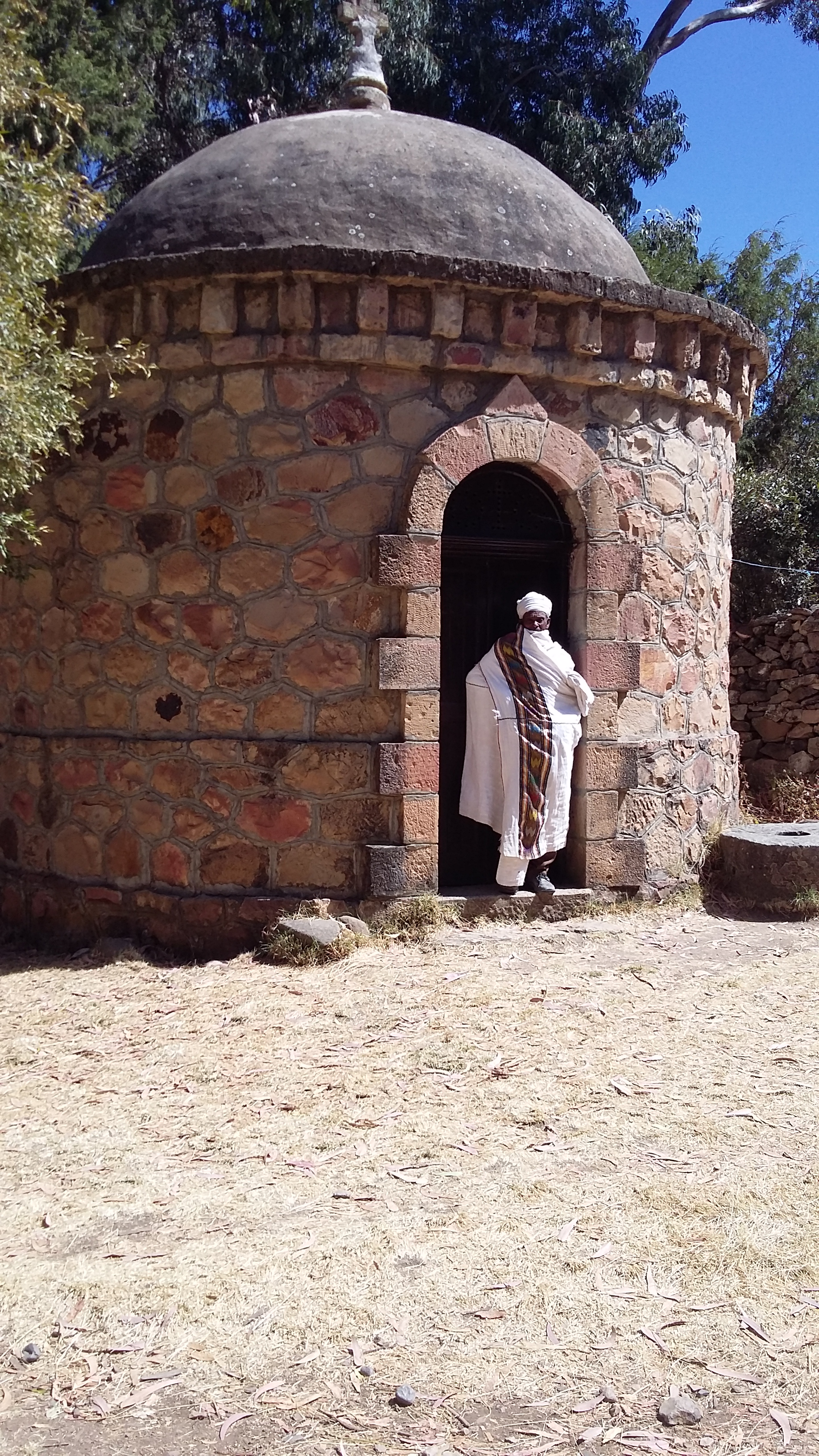
Negus Mikael and some of his family members was buried in this mausoleum.

Negus Mikael died on 8 September 1918. The body was then carried from Holeta (Menagesha) to Tenta for burial. The king was buried in Tenta St Mikael Church.

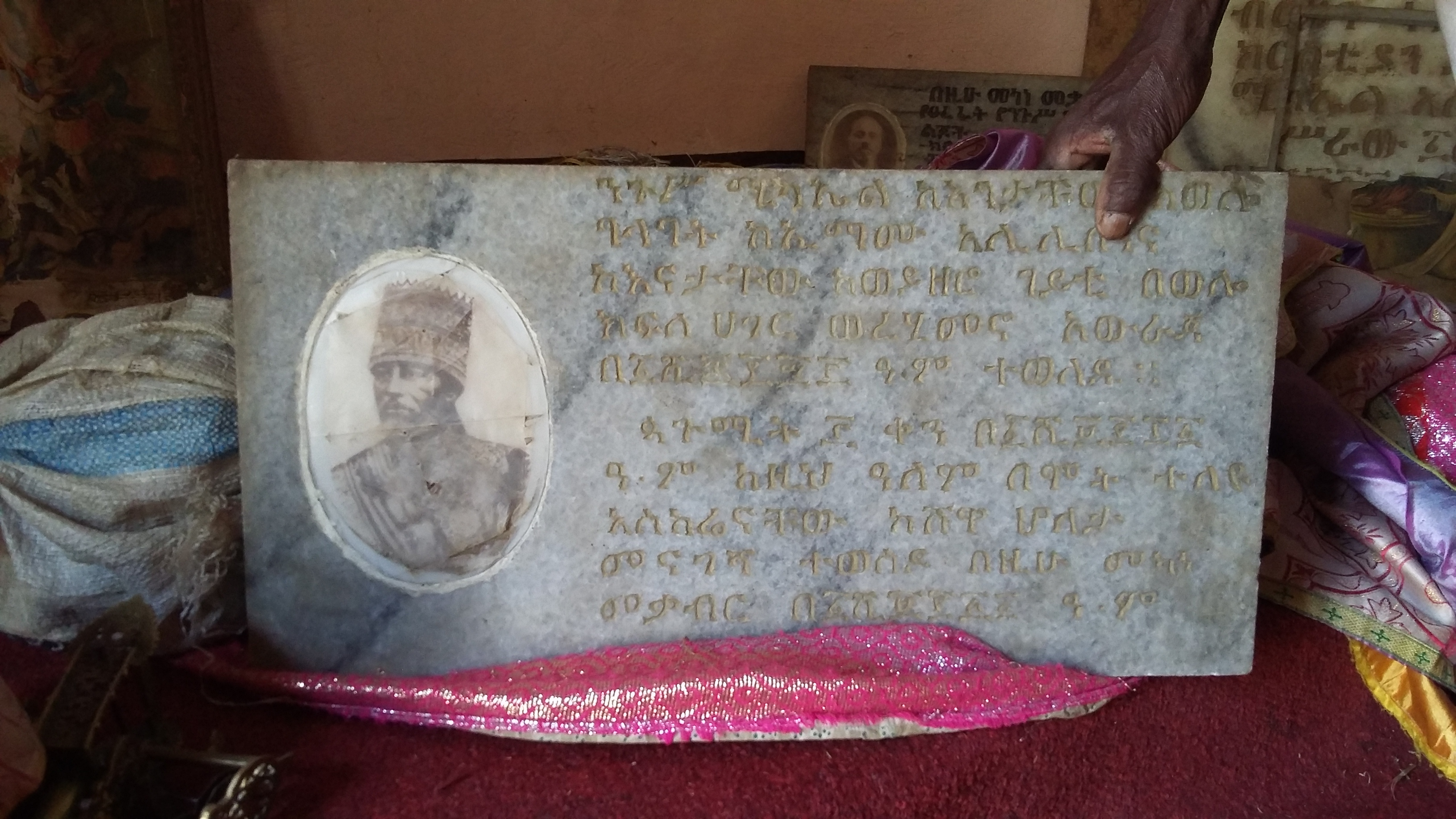
Inscription on the death and burial of Negus Mikael of Wollo

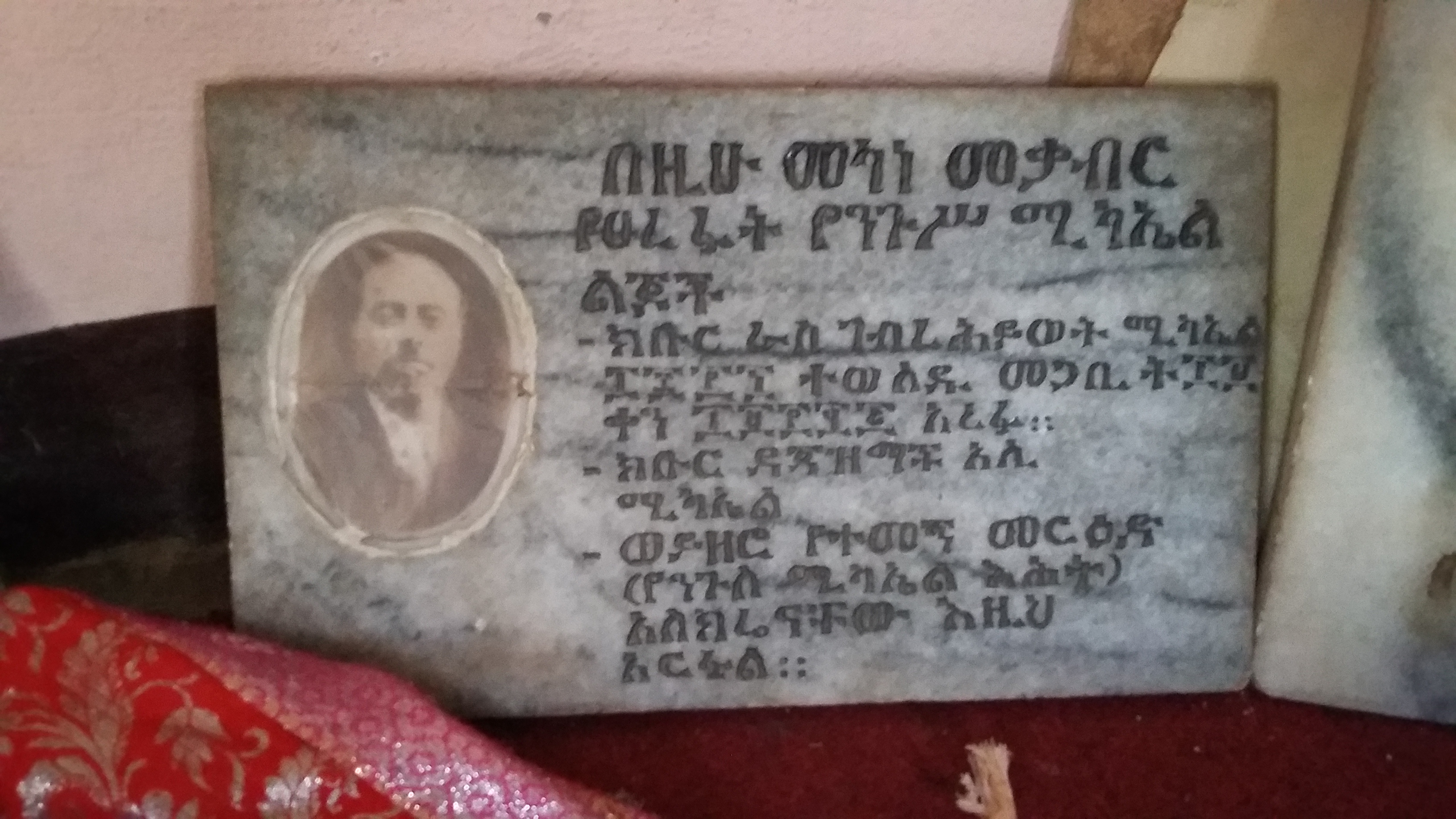
Negus Mikael Tomb Inscription of all buried family members

A mausoleum, with a dome shaped roofing, is found in the church's compound about 20 metres from the church's building. The king, Negus Mikael, was buried in this mausoleum. Together with the king, two family members are also buried there: his sons Gebrehiwot Mikael and Ali Mikael, together with Negus Mikael's sister, Yetemegn Mere'ed.

== See also ==
- List of field marshals
- Sultan Abba Jifar

== Notes ==
Footnotes

Citations
