= Second Italo-Ethiopian War =

1935–1936 war between Italy and Ethiopia

- Part of the interwar period
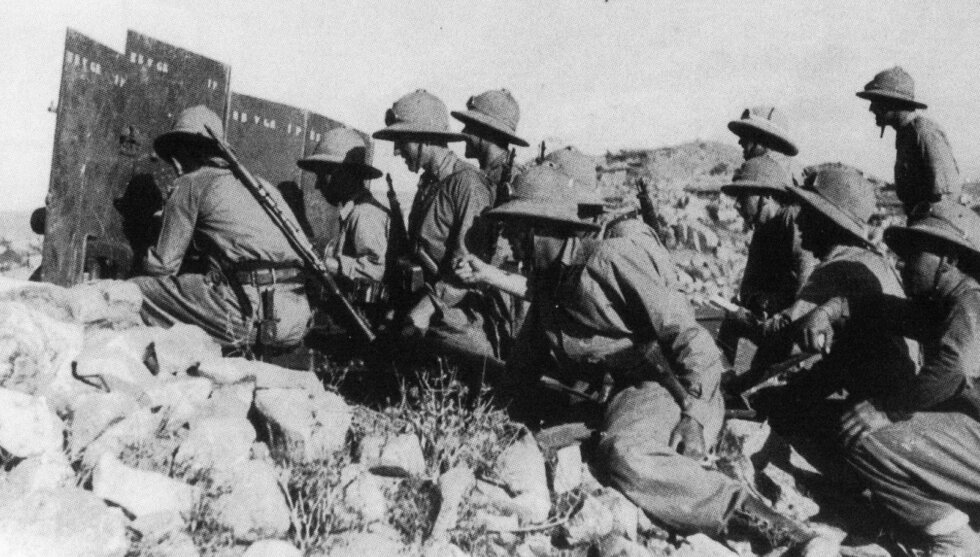
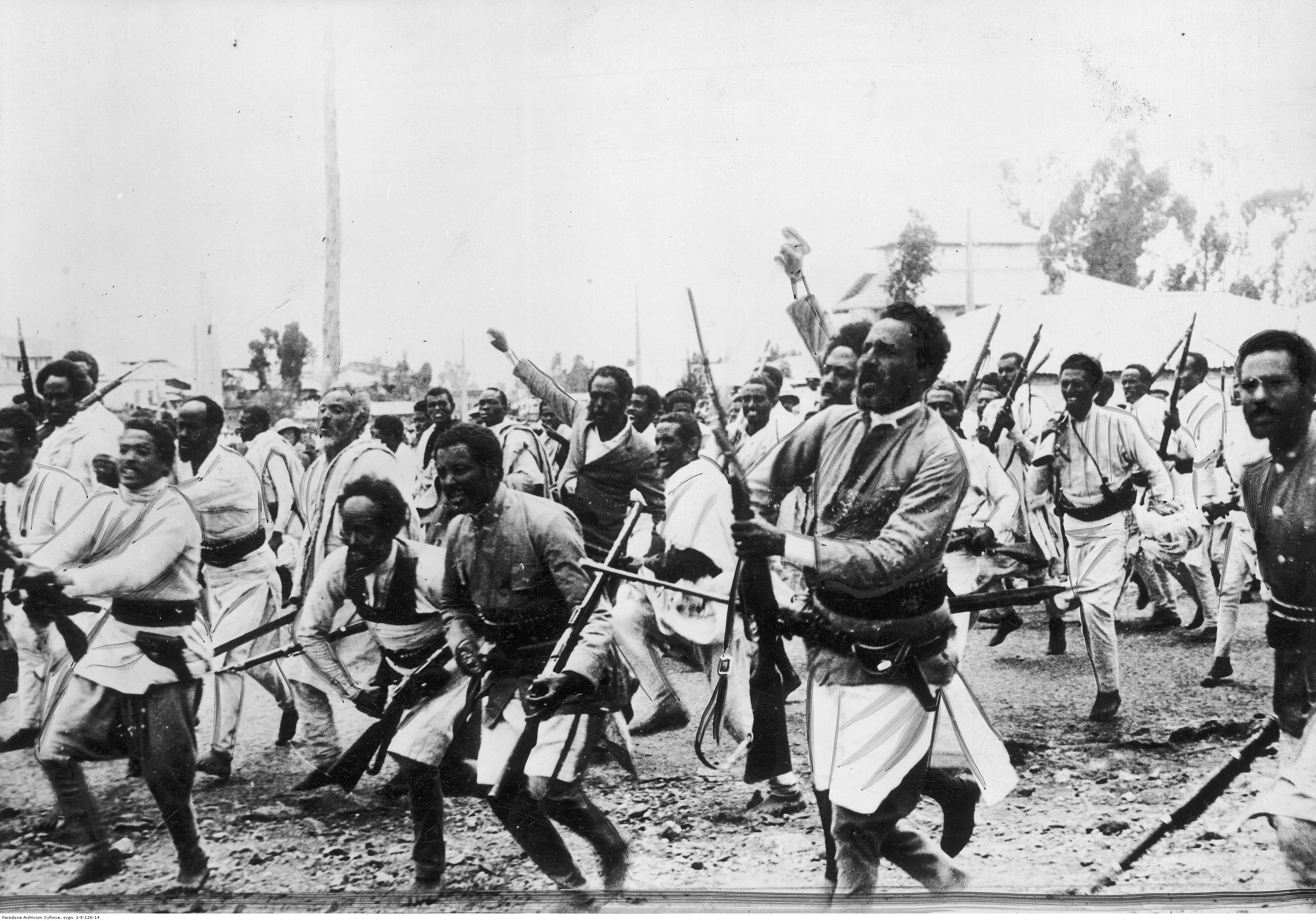
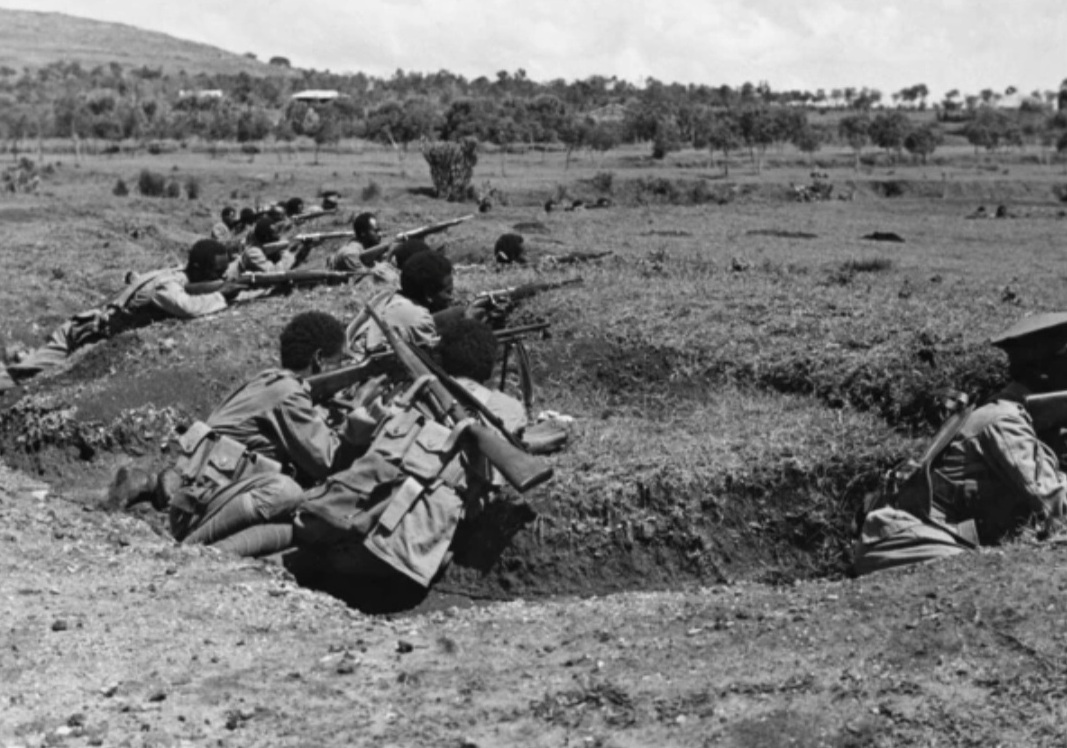
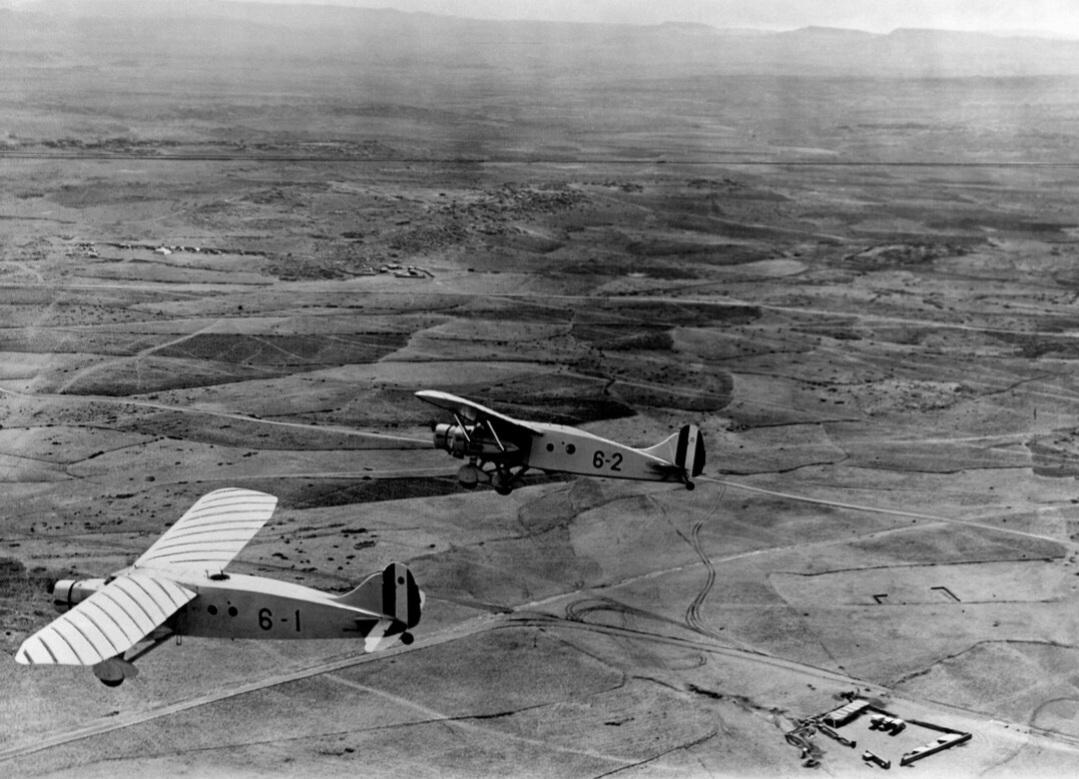
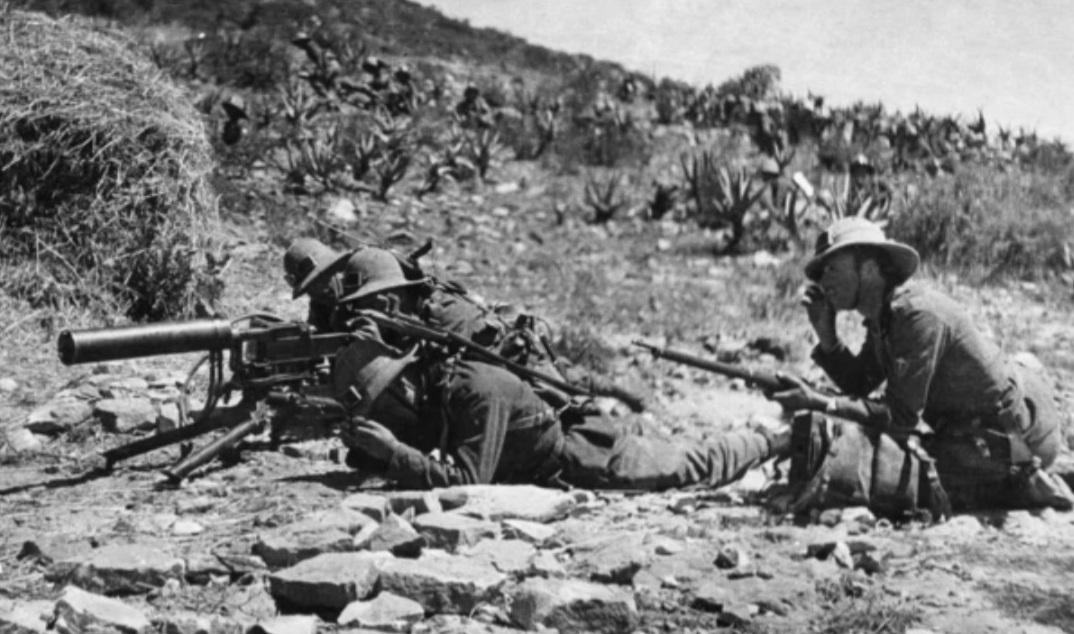
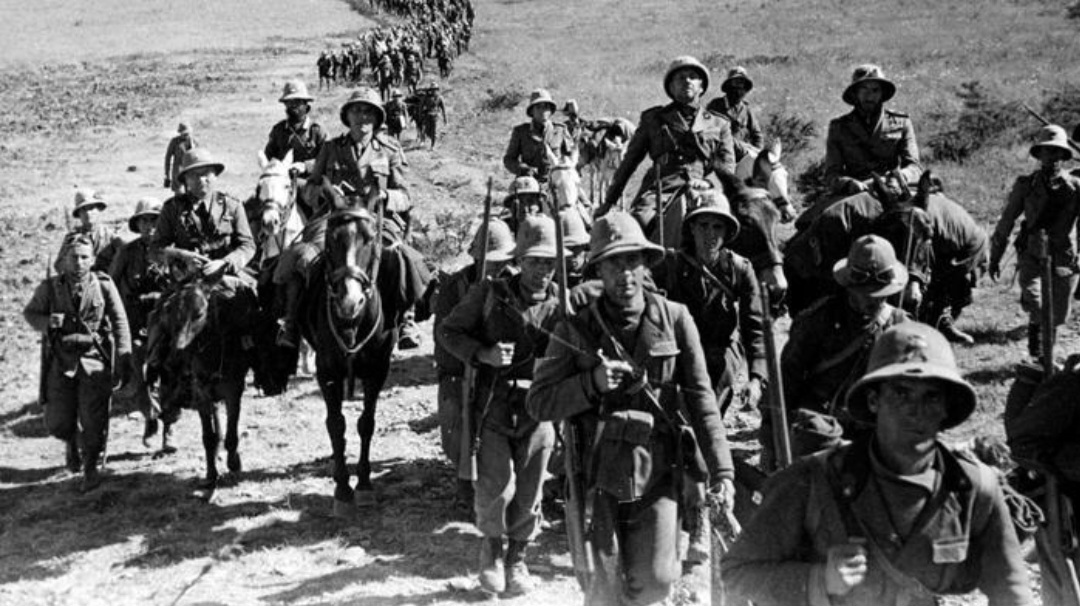
- Clockwise from top left: An Italian 65 mm mountain gun crew; Ethiopian soldiers assembling in the north; Italian bombers in flight; Column of Italian troops marching; Italian soldiers with a machine gun; Ethiopian soldiers in a trench.
Date	3 October 1935 – 5 May 1936 (7 months and 2 days) (Note: On 5 May 1936, Addis Ababa was captured and Mussolini declared the end of the war. On 9 May 1936, Mussolini declared Italy to be an "Empire" and announced the annexation of Ethiopia. Resistance movements continued for several years after the Italian victory. The date of the last battle between regular Ethiopian and Italian forces was 19 February 1937)
Location	Ethiopia
Result	Italian victory
Territorial changes	Formation of Italian East Africa

Belligerents
Ethiopian Empire	Kingdom of Italy

Commanders and leaders
Haile Selassie I; Imru Haile Selassie (surrendered); Mulugeta Yeggazu †; Kassa Haile Darge; Nasibu Emmanual; Desta Damtew (executed)	Benito Mussolini; Pietro Badoglio; Emilio De Bono; Rodolfo Graziani

Strength
350,000–760,000; 4 tanks; 7 armoured cars; 200 artillery pieces; 13 aircraft	500,000–685,000; 599–800 tanks; 2,000 artillery pieces; 595 aircraft

Casualties and losses
~70,000 killed	8,231 killed (Note: 3,731 Italian soldiers and 4,500 askaris killed) 9,000 wounded 18,200 repatriated for disease
- 250,000–270,000 Ethiopian deaths

The Second Italo-Ethiopian War, also referred to as the Second Italo-Abyssinian War, was a war of aggression waged by Italy against Ethiopia, which lasted from October 1935 to May 1936. In Ethiopia it is often referred to simply as the Italian Invasion (Amharic: ጣልያን ወረራ, romanized: Ṭalyan warära), and in Italy as the Ethiopian War (Italian: Guerra d'Etiopia). The war is regarded as the largest colonial campaign in history.

On 3 October 1935, two hundred thousand soldiers of the Regio Esercito (Royal Army) commanded by Marshal Emilio De Bono attacked from Italian Eritrea without prior declaration of war. At the same time a smaller force under General Rodolfo Graziani attacked from Italian Somalia. On 6 October, the Italians captured Adwa, taking revenge for their 1896 defeat in the First Italo-Ethiopian War. On 15 October, Italian troops seized the town of Aksum, and its famous obelisk was torn down and sent to Rome to be placed symbolically in front of the building of the Ministry of Colonies. Exasperated by De Bono's slow and cautious progress, Benito Mussolini replaced him with General Pietro Badoglio on 14 November.

Ethiopian forces launched a counterattack in December 1935 that achieved some gains and temporarily halted the Italian advance. Frustrated, Mussolini authorized the use of mustard gas, with the Regia Aeronautica (Royal Air Force) dropping 330 tons over the next four months, violating the 1925 Geneva Protocol. The Italians resumed the offensive in early February, decisively defeating the Ethiopian armies at Amba Aradam, Tembien, and Shire. On 31 March 1936, the Italians won a decisive victory at Maychew, ending organized Ethiopian resistance. Emperor Haile Selassie was forced to flee into exile on 2 May, and Badoglio's forces arrived in the capital Addis Ababa on 5 May, and Mussolini announced the annexation of Ethiopia on 9 May, forming the colony of Italian East Africa. Ethiopian guerilla resistance to Italian rule continued until the country was liberated in 1941.

Overall, the war was a major military and propaganda success for the Italian fascist regime, achieved relatively quickly. However, it also placed a significant strain on an already seriously unbalanced budget, weakening Italy's long-term economic position. The Italian aggression against Ethiopia had significant diplomatic consequences, leading to the end of Italy's Stresa Front alliance with the Western powers and its rapprochement with Nazi Germany. Simultaneously, the inability of the League of Nations to prevent the invasion discredited it internationally in the run-up to the Second World War.

Italian troops used mustard gas in aerial bombardments (in violation of the Geneva Conventions) against combatants and civilians in an attempt to suppress Ethiopian resistance. Deliberate Italian attacks against ambulances and hospitals of the Red Cross were reported. By all estimates, hundreds of thousands of Ethiopian civilians died in the invasion, which has been described by some historians as constituting genocide. Crimes by Ethiopian troops included the use of dumdum bullets (in violation of the Hague Conventions), the killing of civilian workmen (including during the Gondrand massacre) and the mutilation of captured Eritrean Ascari and Italians (often with castration).

== Background ==
=== State of East Africa ===
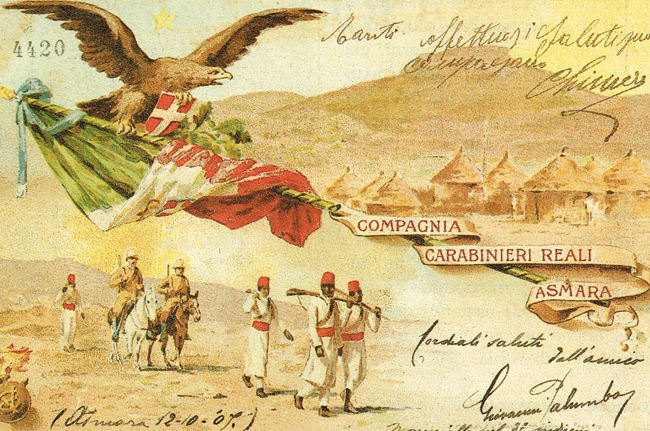
Postcard from Italian Eritrea, 1907

The Kingdom of Italy began its attempts to establish colonies in the Horn of Africa in the 1880s. The first phase of the colonial expansion concluded with the disastrous First Italo-Ethiopian War and the defeat of the Italian forces in the Battle of Adwa on 1 March 1896, inflicted by the Ethiopian Army of Negus Menelik II. In the following years, Italy abandoned its expansionist plans in the area and limited itself to administering the small possessions that it retained in the area: the colony of Italian Eritrea and the protectorate (later colony) of Italian Somaliland. For the next few decades, Italian-Ethiopian economic and diplomatic relations remained relatively stable.

On 14 December 1925, Italy's fascist government signed a secret pact with Britain aimed at reinforcing Italian dominance in the region. London recognised that the area was of Italian interest and agreed to the Italian request to build a railway connecting Somalia and Eritrea. Although the signatories had wished to maintain the secrecy of the agreement, the plan soon leaked and caused indignation by the French and Ethiopian governments. The latter denounced it as a betrayal of a fellow member country of the League of Nations.

As fascist rule in Italy became increasingly dictatorial, its colonial governors in the Horn of Africa began pushing outward the margins of their imperial foothold. The governor of Italian Eritrea, Jacopo Gasparini, focused on attempting to win over the leaders of the Tigrinya people against Ethiopia. The governor of Italian Somaliland, Cesare Maria de Vecchi, began a policy of repression that led to the absorption of the fertile Jubaland and the annexation of various Somali protectorates during the Campaign of the Sultanates.

=== Walwal Incident ===
The Horn of Africa in the early 1930s with the site of the Wal Wal incident highlighted

The Italo-Ethiopian Treaty of 1928 stated that the border between Italian Somaliland and Ethiopia was 21 leagues parallel to the Benadir coast (approximately 118.3 kilometres [73.5 miles]). In 1930, Italy built a fort at the Walwal oasis (also Welwel, Italian: Ual-Ual) in the Ogaden and garrisoned it with Somali dubats (irregular frontier troops commanded by Italian officers). The fort at Walwal was well beyond the 21-league limit and inside Ethiopian territory. On 23 November 1934, an Anglo–Ethiopian boundary commission studying grazing grounds to find a definitive border between British Somaliland and Ethiopia arrived at Walwal.

The party contained Ethiopian and British technicians and an escort of around 600 Ethiopian soldiers. Both sides knew that the Italians had installed a military post at Walwal and were not surprised to see an Italian flag at the wells. The Ethiopian government had notified the Italian authorities in Italian Somaliland that the commission was active in the Ogaden and requested the Italians to co-operate. When the British commissioner Lieutenant-Colonel Esmond Clifford, asked the Italians for permission to camp nearby, the Italian commander, Captain Roberto Cimmaruta, rebuffed the request.

Fitawrari Shiferra, the commander of the Ethiopian escort, took no notice of the 150 Italian and Somali troops and made camp. To avoid being caught in an Italian–Ethiopian incident, Clifford withdrew the British contingent to Ado, about 20 mi (32 km) to the north-east, and Italian aircraft began to fly over Walwal. The Ethiopian commissioners retired with the British, but the escort remained. For ten days both sides exchanged menaces, sometimes no more than 2 m apart. Reinforcements increased the Ethiopian contingent to about 1,500 men and the Italians to about 500, and on 5 December 1934, shots were fired. The Italians were supported by an armoured car and bomber aircraft. The bombs missed, but machine gunfire from the car caused about 110 Ethiopian casualties. 30 to 50 Italians and Somalis were killed. The incident led to the Abyssinia Crisis at the League of Nations. On 4 September 1935, the League of Nations exonerated both parties for the incident.

=== Abyssinian crisis ===
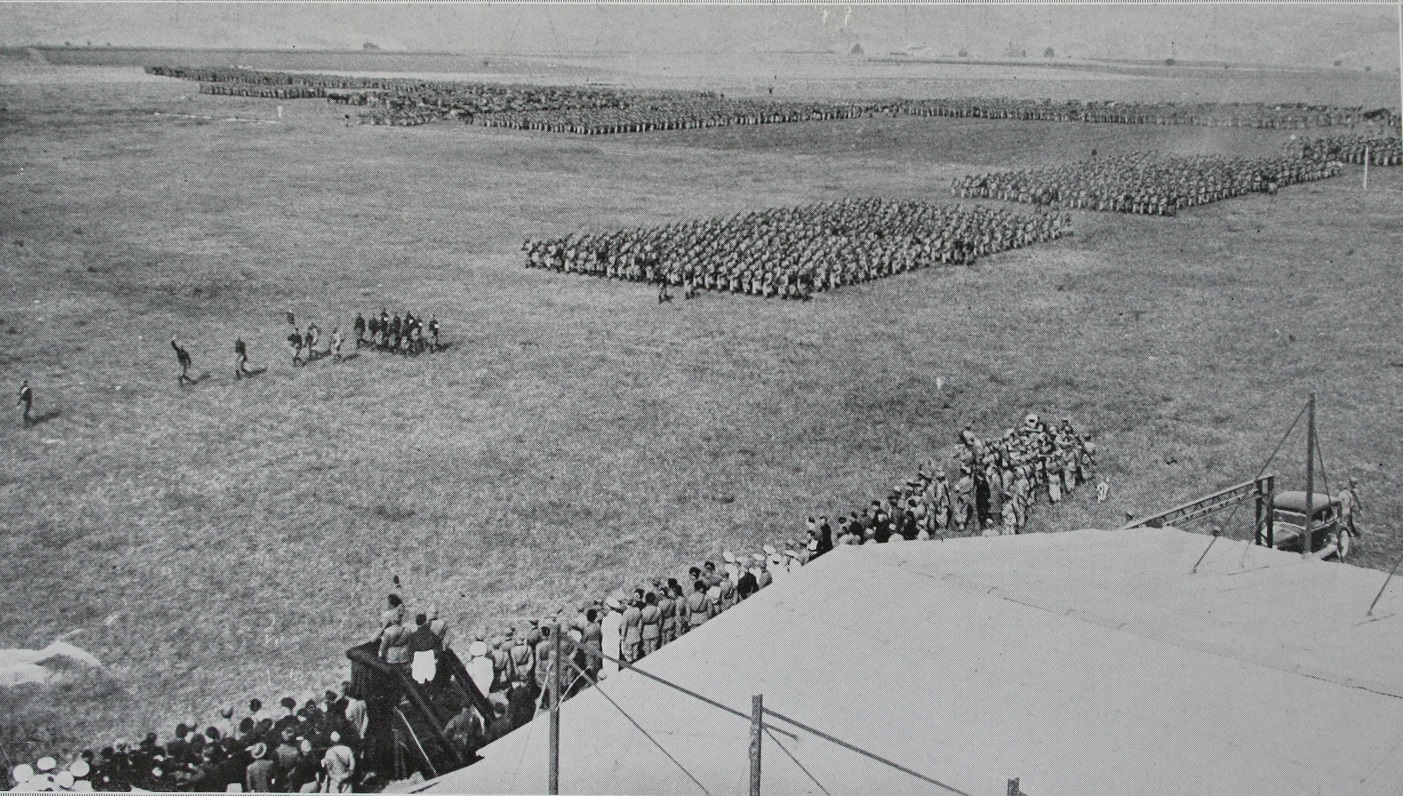
Benito Mussolini reviewing the 2nd CC.NN. Division "28 Ottobre" before its departure to East Africa, August 1935

Britain and France, preferring Italy as an ally against Germany, did not take strong steps to discourage an Italian military buildup on the borders of Italian Eritrea and Italian Somaliland. Because of the German question, Mussolini needed to deter Hitler from annexing Austria while much of the Italian Army was being deployed to the Horn of Africa, which led him to draw closer to France to provide the necessary deterrent. King Victor Emmanuel III shared the traditional Italian respect for British sea power and insisted to Mussolini that Italy must not antagonise Britain before he assented to the war. In that regard, British diplomacy in the first half of 1935 greatly assisted Mussolini's efforts to win Victor Emmanuel's support for the invasion.

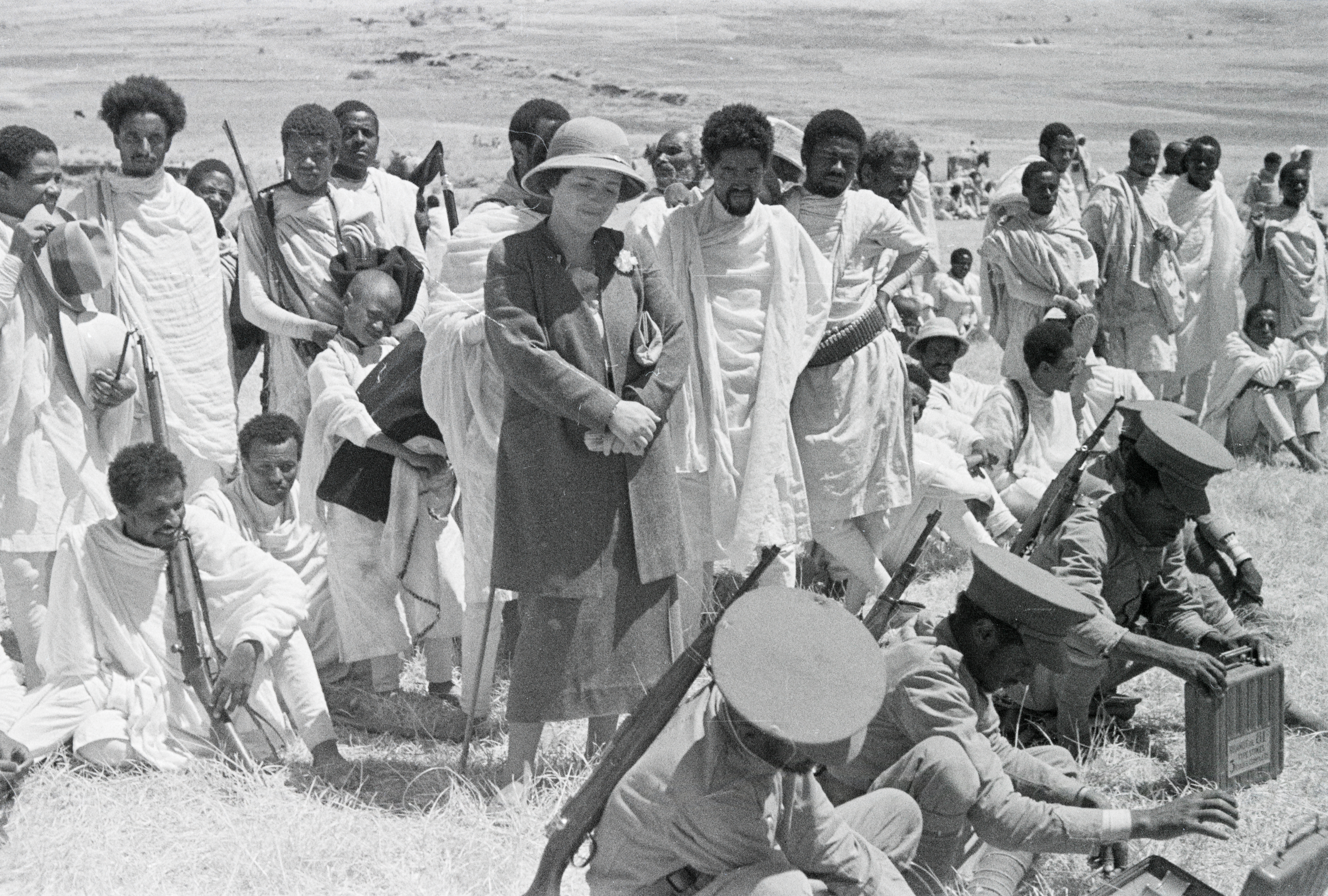
A European tourist with Ethiopian soldiers, February 1934

On 7 January 1935, a Franco-Italian Agreement was made that gave Italy essentially a free hand in Africa in return for Italian co-operation in Europe. French Foreign Minister Pierre Laval told Mussolini that he wanted a Franco-Italian alliance against Nazi Germany and that Italy had a "free hand" in Ethiopia. In April, Italy was further emboldened by participation in the Stresa Front, an agreement to curb further German violations of the Treaty of Versailles. The first draft of the communique at Stresa Summit spoke of upholding stability all over the world, but British Foreign Secretary, Sir John Simon, insisted for the final draft to declare that Britain, France and Italy were committed to upholding stability "in Europe", which Mussolini took for British acceptance of an invasion of Ethiopia.

In June, non-interference was further assured by a political rift, which had developed between the United Kingdom and France, because of the Anglo-German Naval Agreement. As 300,000 Italian soldiers were transferred to Eritrea and Italian Somaliland over the spring and the summer of 1935, the world's media was abuzz with speculation that Italy would soon be invading Ethiopia. In June 1935, Anthony Eden arrived in Rome with the message that Britain opposed an invasion and had a compromise plan for Italy to be given a corridor in Ethiopia to link the two Italian colonies in the Horn of Africa, which Mussolini rejected outright. As the Italians had broken the British naval codes, Mussolini knew of the problems in the British Mediterranean Fleet, which led him to believe that the British opposition to the invasion, which had come as an unwelcome surprise to him, was not serious and that Britain would never go to war over Ethiopia.

The prospect that an Italian invasion of Ethiopia would cause a crisis in Anglo-Italian relations was seen as an opportunity in Berlin. Although Adolf Hitler did not want to see Emperor Haile Selassie win, Germany provided some weapons to Ethiopia out of fear of quick victory for Italy. The German perspective was that if Italy was bogged down in a long war in Ethiopia, that would probably lead to Britain pushing the League of Nations to impose sanctions on Italy, which the French would almost certainly not veto out of fear of destroying relations with Britain; that would cause a crisis in Anglo-Italian relations and allow Germany to offer its "good services" to Italy. In that way, Hitler hoped to win Mussolini as an ally and to destroy the Stresa Front. Selassie was reportedly grateful for the German support. After receiving a personal letter from Hitler in December 1934, he began referring to Nazi Germany as Ethiopia's only "sincere friend".

== Armies ==
=== Ethiopian forces ===
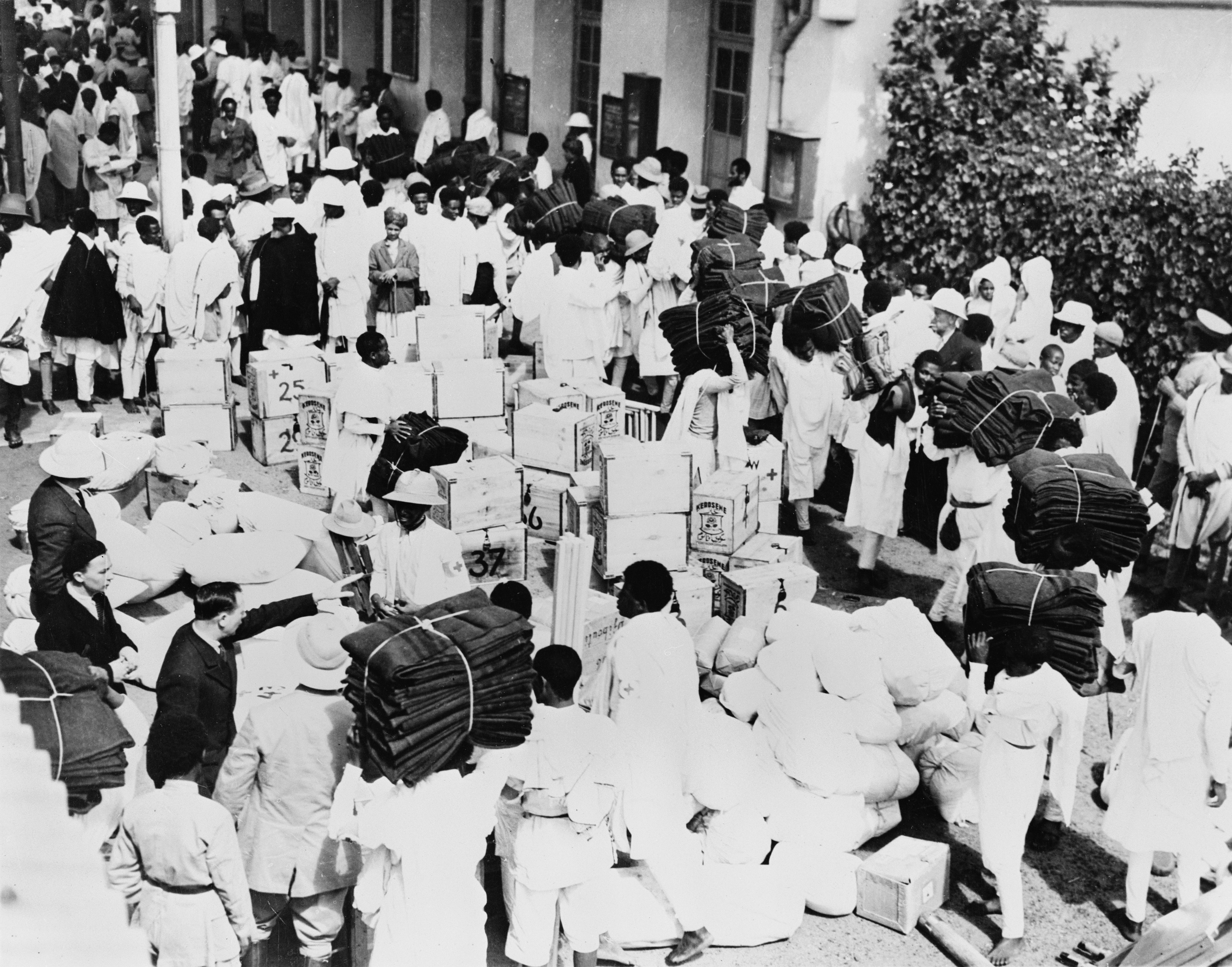
Medical supplies for the front in Addis Ababa

On the eve of hostilities, the Ethiopians had mobilized an army of 350,000–760,000 men equipped with repeating rifles of various models and calibers, though mostly modern, with approximately 150 rounds of ammunition per soldier. As war appeared inevitable, Haile Selassie began to accelerate the rearmament and "spend every last cent to defend the integrity of Ethiopia", making available his entire personal fortune. From January to July 1935, Ethiopia was able to import large numbers of weapons from Europe, before the embargo decreed by the League of Nations came into force, approximately 16,000 rifles, 600 light machine guns and half a million bullets were imported into the country. The arms embargo imposed on the belligerents by France and Britain disproportionately affected Ethiopia, which lacked the manufacturing industry to produce its own weapons. Only Germany, which hoped to keep Italy busy in Africa for as long as possible in order to ease its pressure on Austria, continued to secretly supply Ethiopia with arms and ammunition. The Germans sent three aeroplanes, 10,000 Mauser rifles, 10 million rounds of ammunition, 36 20 mm Oerlikon cannons and 30 Rheinmetall-Borsig 37 mm anti-aircraft guns to the Ethiopians.

The Ethiopian army had about 800 light Colt and Hotchkiss machine-guns and 250 heavy Vickers and Hotchkiss machine guns, about 100 .303-inch Vickers guns on AA mounts, 48 20 mm Oerlikon S anti-aircraft guns and some recently purchased Canon de 75 CA modèle 1917 Schneider 75 mm field guns. The Ethiopian army had some 300 trucks, seven Ford A-based armoured cars and four World War I–era Fiat 3000 tanks.

The best Ethiopian units were the emperor's "Kebur Zabagna" (Imperial Guard), which were well-trained and better equipped than the other Ethiopian troops. The Imperial Guard wore a distinctive greenish-khaki uniform inspired by the Belgian Army, which stood out from the white cotton cloak (shamma), which was worn by most Ethiopian fighters. The skills of the Rases, the Ethiopian generals, were reported to rate from relatively good to incompetent. Haile Selassie ordered the use of guerrilla tactics, but for cultural reasons this would be impracticable. Most of his commanders considered guerrilla warfare to be dishonorable, so they instead preferred to engage the Italians in frontal battles.

The serviceable portion of the Ethiopian Air Force included three obsolete Potez 25 biplanes. A few transport aircraft had been acquired between 1934 and 1935 for ambulance work, but the Air Force had 13 aircraft and four pilots at the outbreak of the war. Airspeed in England had a surplus Viceroy racing plane, and its director, Neville Shute, was delighted with a good offer for the "white elephant" in August 1935. The agent said that it was to fly cinema films around Europe. When the client wanted bomb racks to carry the (flammable) films, Shute agreed to fit lugs under the wings to which they could attach "anything they liked". He was told that the plane was to be used to bomb the Italian oil storage tanks at Massawa, and when the Criminal Investigation Department enquired about the alien (ex-German) pilot practices in it Shute got the impression that the Foreign Office did not object. However, fuel, bombs and bomb racks from Finland could not reach Ethiopia in time, and the paid-for Viceroy stayed at its works. The emperor of Ethiopia had £16,000 to spend on modern aircraft to resist the Italians and planned to spend £5000 on the Viceroy and the rest on three Gloster Gladiator fighters.

There were 50 foreigners who joined the Ethiopian forces, including the African American pilot John Robinson, French pilots like Pierre Corriger and André Maillet, a former Ottoman general named Wehib Pasha, an official Swedish military mission under Captain Viking Tamm, the White Russian Feodor Konovalov and the Czechoslovak writer Adolf Parlesak. Several Austrian Nazis, a team of Belgian fascists, and the Cuban mercenary Alejandro del Valle also fought for Haile Selassie. Many of the individuals were military advisers, pilots, doctors or supporters of the Ethiopian cause; 50 mercenaries fought in the Ethiopian army and another 50 people were active in the Ethiopian Red Cross or nonmilitary activities.

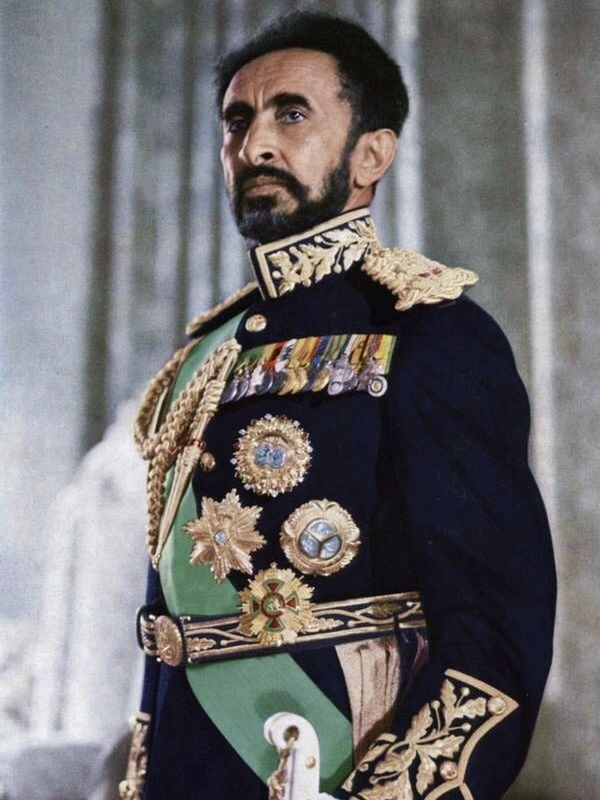
Haile Selassie

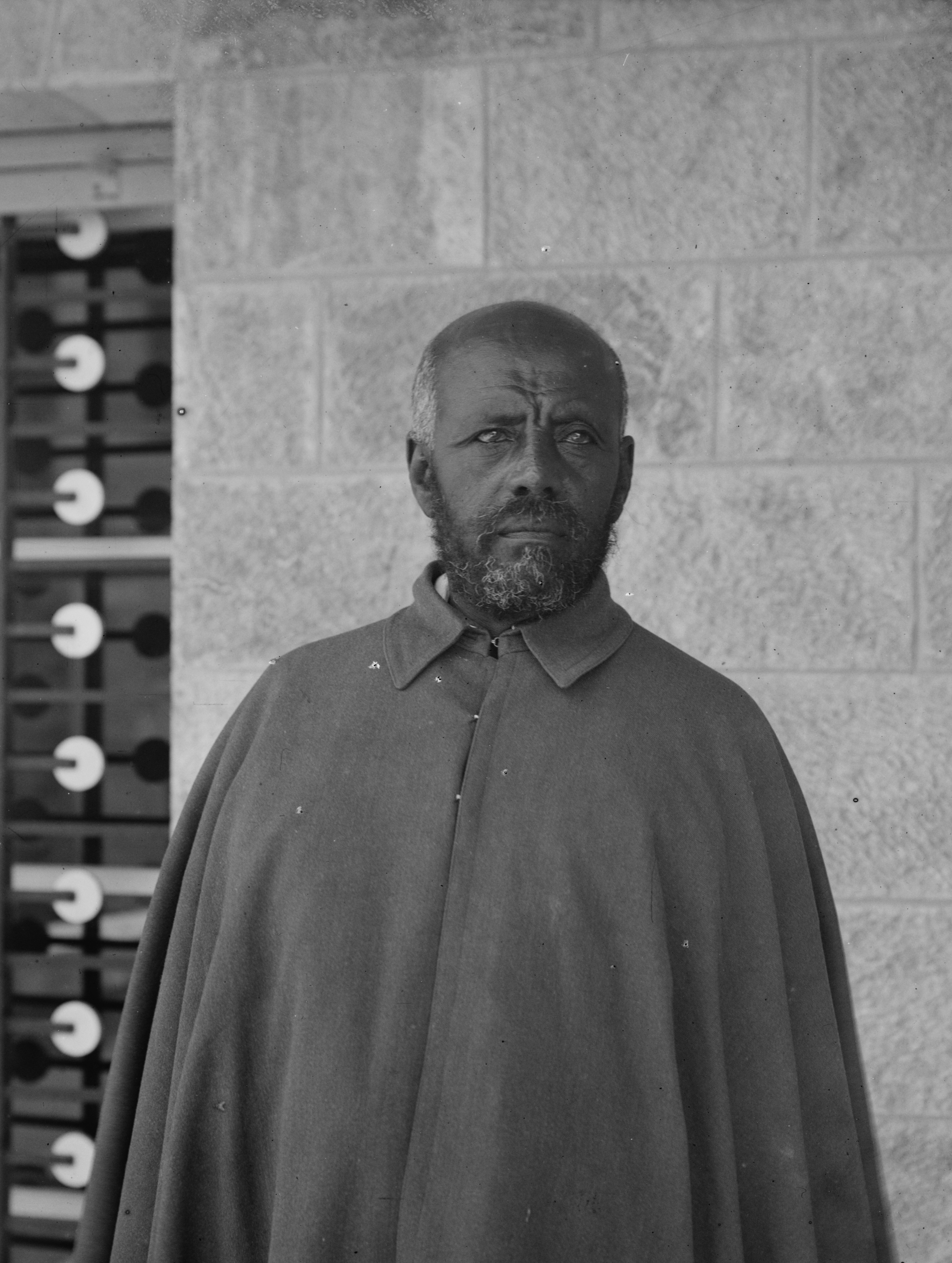
Ras Kassa Haile Darge

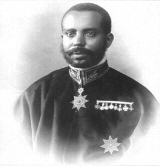
Imru Haile Selassie

=== Italian forces ===
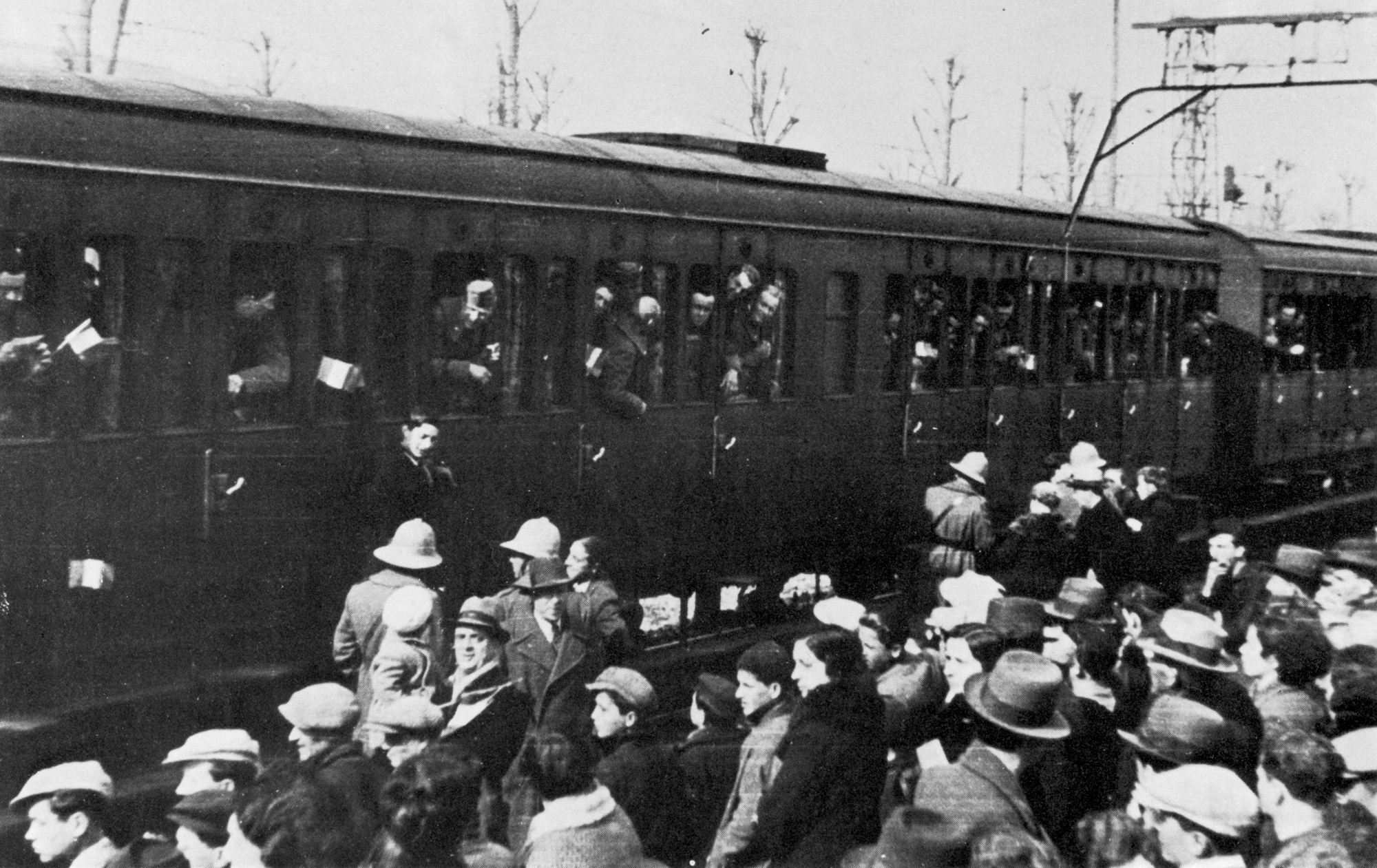
Italian soldiers recruited in 1935 in Montevarchi to fight the Second Italo-Abyssinian War

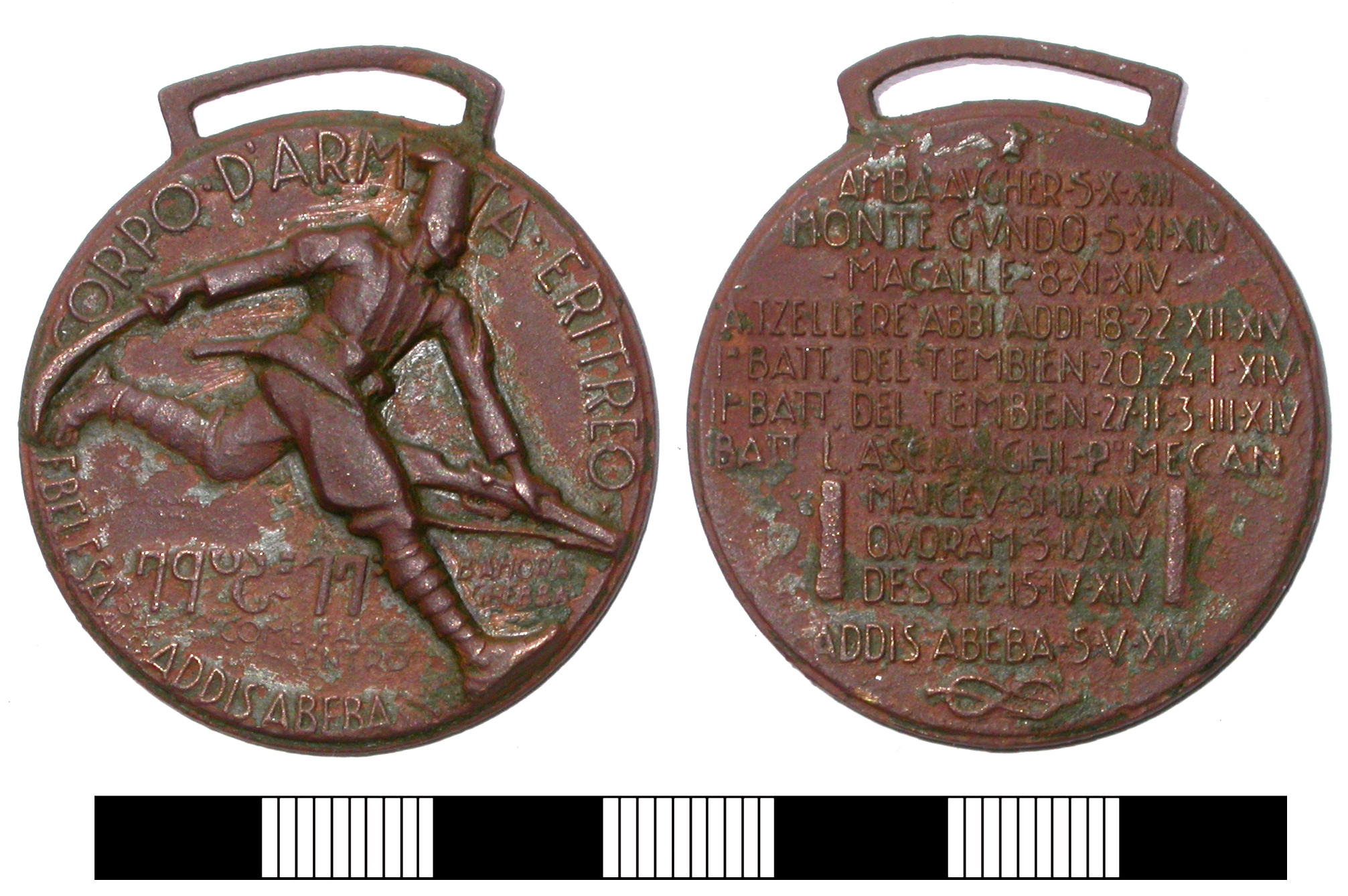
Medal commemorating the role of the Italian Eritrean colonial troops in the war

In April 1935, the mobilization of the Royal Italian Army (Regio Esercito) and the Regia Aeronautica (Royal Air Force) in East Africa (Africa Orientale) began. The mobilization of men and resources was a significant achievement for Italy and, despite the limited time available, was carried out without major difficulties. It reached extraordinary proportions, being regarded as the largest colonial army ever assembled in terms of manpower and equipment. The classes from 1911 to 1915 were called to arms, which allowed the army to have an enormous availability of men without weakening the army at home. Between February 1935 and January 1936, six army divisions were sent to Eritrea and one to Somalia.

At Mussolini's request, the Voluntary Militia for National Security (Blackshirts) became an important component of the expeditionary force, intended to represent the fascist character of the campaign; thanks to the approximately 80,000 volunteers who showed up (including those not used by the army) six Blackshirt divisions were sent between August and November 1935 to Eritrea and one to Somalia. Overall, about 685,000 soldiers and a great number of logistical and support units was sent to East Africa; which included 200 journalists. The Italians had 6,000 machine guns, 2,000 pieces of artillery, 599 tanks and 390 aircraft. The Regia Marina (Royal Navy) carried tons of ammunition, food and other supplies, with the motor vehicles to move them, but the Ethiopians had only horse-drawn carts.

The Italians placed considerable reliance on their Royal Corps of Colonial Troops (Regio Corpo Truppe Coloniali, RCTC) of indigenous regiments recruited from the Italian colonies of Eritrea, Somalia and Libya. The most effective of the Italian commanded units were the Eritrean native infantry (Ascari), which was often used as advanced troops. The Eritreans also provided cavalry and artillery units; the "Falcon Feathers" (Penne di Falco) was one prestigious and colourful Eritrean cavalry unit. Other RCTC units during the invasion of Ethiopia were irregular Somali frontier troops (dubats), regular Arab-Somali infantry and artillery and infantry from Libya. The Italians had a variety of local semi-independent "allies" in the north, and the Azebo Galla were among several groups induced to fight for the Italians. In the south, the Somali sultan Olol Dinle commanded a personal army, which advanced into the northern Ogaden with the forces of Colonel Luigi Frusci. The Italian colonial forces even included men from Yemen, across the Gulf of Aden.

The Italians were reinforced by volunteers from the so-called Italiani all'estero, members of the Italian diaspora from Argentina, Uruguay and Brazil; they formed the 221st Legion in the Divisione Tevere, which a special Legione Parini fought under Luigi Frusci on the southern front. The most notable foreign volunteer on the Italian side was the Peruvian Antonio Cicirello, who was posthumously decorated with the Gold Medal of Military Valour. Most foreigners accompanied the Ethiopians, but Herbert Matthews, a reporter and historian who wrote Eyewitness in Abyssinia: With Marshal Bodoglio's forces to Addis Ababa (1937), and Pedro del Valle, an observer for US Marine Corps, accompanied the Italian forces.

On 28 March 1935, General Emilio De Bono was named the commander-in-chief of all Italian armed forces in East Africa. De Bono was also the commander-in-chief of the forces invading from Eritrea on the northern front. De Bono commanded nine divisions in the Italian I Corps, the Italian II Corps and the Eritrean Corps. General Rodolfo Graziani was commander-in-chief of forces invading from Italian Somaliland on the southern front. Initially, he had two divisions and a variety of smaller units under his command: a mixture of Italians, Somalis, Eritreans, Libyans and others. De Bono regarded Italian Somaliland as a secondary theatre, whose primary need was to defend itself, but it could aid the main front with offensive thrusts if the enemy forces were not too large there.

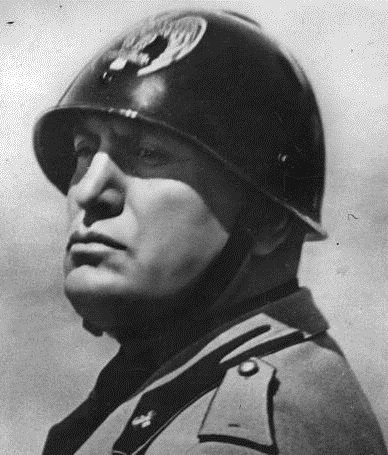
Benito Mussolini

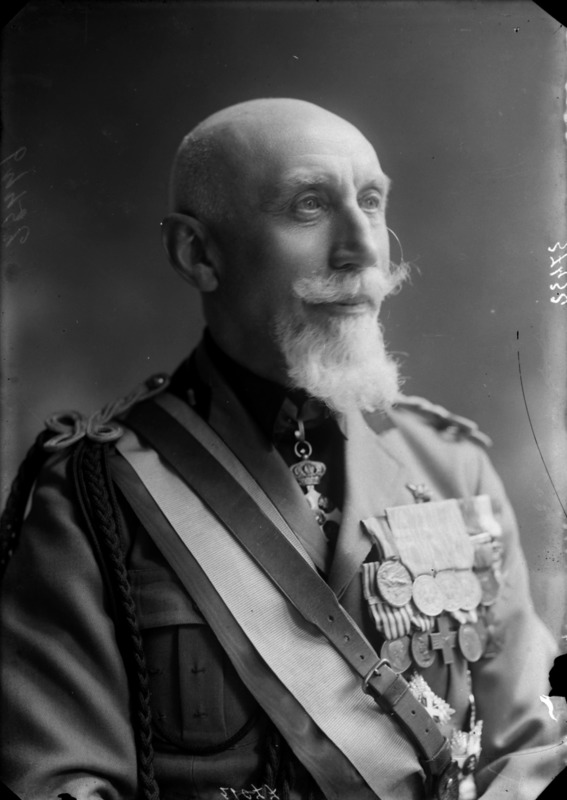
Emilio De Bono

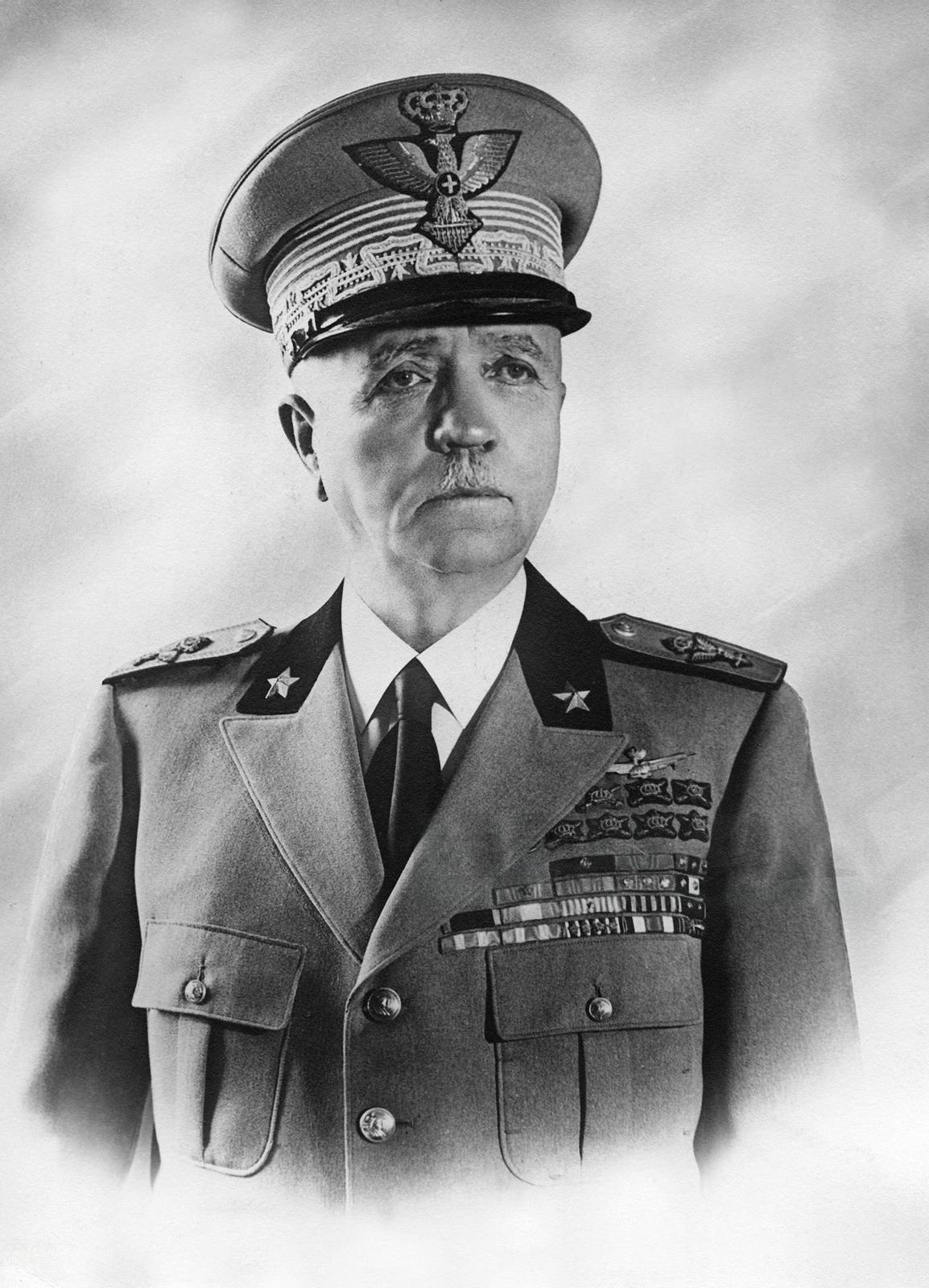
Pietro Badoglio

== Hostilities ==
=== Italian invasion ===
A map showing the military actions from 1935 to February 1936

At 5:00 am on 3 October 1935, De Bono crossed the Mareb River and advanced into Ethiopia from Eritrea without a formal declaration of war. General De Bono's attack force included the I Army Corps under General Ruggero Santini on the left; the II Army Corps under Lieutenant General Pietro Maravigna on the right, and the Eritrean Army Corps (Corpo d'Armata Indigeni) under General Alessandro Pirzio Biroli in the center. On De Bono's flanks, the eastern lowlands included the 13th and 26th Colonial battalions, a Libyan battalion, and three irregular bands in the regions of Massawa, northern Danakil, and southern Danakil. The western lowlands included the 27th and 28th Colonial battalions, a unit of irregulars and Libyan volunteers supported by the 17th Colonial Battalion.

At this point in the campaign, the lack of roads represented a serious hindrance for the Italians as they crossed into Ethiopia. On the Eritrean side, roads had been constructed right up to the border. On the Ethiopian side, these roads often transitioned into vaguely defined paths, and the Italian army used aerial photography to plan its advance. De Bono realized that the Italian lines were over-extended and his forces were incapable of holding a 300-mile-long front in a region filled with steep mountains and deep gorges. The early rainy season also had washed out several recently built mountain roads, thus impeding their ability to re-supply troops.

During the first few days, the Italian troops did not encounter any resistance, except for some sporadic firefights along the main routes and, in just three days, they captured the villages of Adigrat and Adwa, left undefended by order of Haile Selassie who had ordered Ras Seyoum Mengesha and his son-in-law and Dejazmach Haile Selassie Gugsa to retreat to Gheralta in southern Tembien and await the southern armies to mobilize. The Ethiopian mobilization, however, proved to be quite slow, especially because the armed columns had to travel hundreds of kilometers on foot to reach Tigray from the various regions of the Empire. A significant offensive could not begin before December; De Bono was aware of this fact and, sticking to his tactics, decided to consolidate the positions while waiting for the enemy offensive, which would allow him to destroy all the Ethiopian forces at once.

On 11 October, Gugsa surrendered with 1,200 followers at the Italian outpost at Idaga Hamus. Italian propagandists lavishly publicised the surrender, but fewer than a tenth of Gugsa's men defected with him. On 14 October, De Bono proclaimed the end of slavery in Ethiopia and the military reported the emancipation of 16,000 slaves over the next two weeks, which greatly pleased international opinion. The next day, Maravigna's II Corps occupied the holy city of Axum, it was here that De Bono halted his advance. Mussolini could not accept a pause in operations, and De Bono was bombarded with requests for a new advance. On 3 November, De Bono began his new advance towards Mekelle with two army corps, Santini's I and Pirzio Biroli's indigenous corps, while Maravigna's II Corps was left as cover 30 kilometres south of Axum; a few light columns advanced towards the Tekezé River and captured the town of Shire. The Italian forces encountered minimal resistance, only a couple of clashes with irregulars; Mekelle had already been abandoned on 27 October and on November 8, the Italian advance guard entered Mekelle. The Italian advance had added 56 mi (90 km) to the line of supply, and De Bono wanted to build a road from Adigrat before continuing.

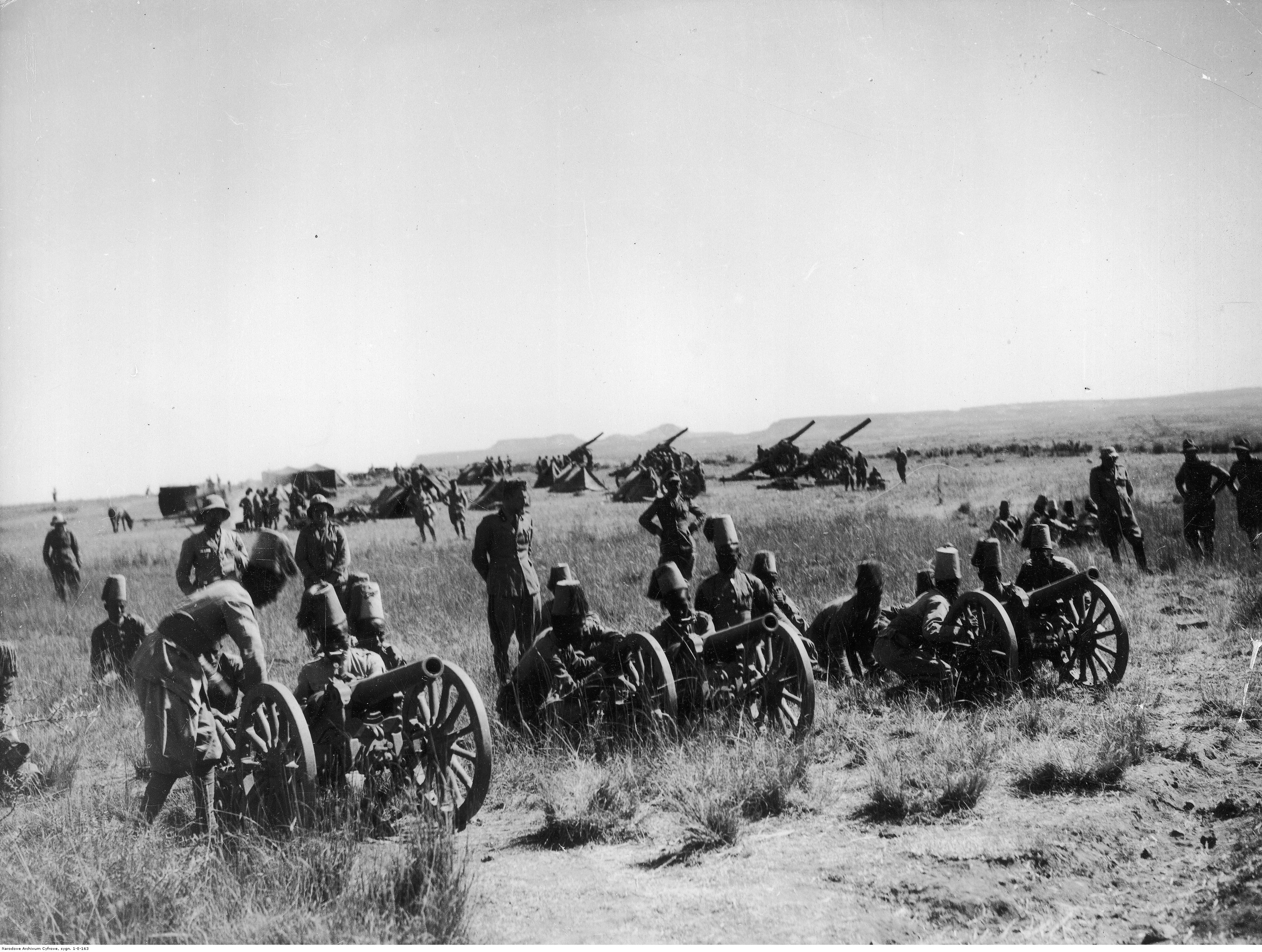
Italian artillery operated by Somali Ascari troops

In early October 1935, Rodolfo Graziani began the southern campaign by deploying mobile columns of motorized troops supported by tanks and the Regia Aeronautica. The Italians faced steady Ethiopian resistance by the troops of Afawarq Walda Samayat in the valley of the River Fafan, at Gorahai. Only after Afawarq was mortally wounded on 7 November did the Italians capture Gorahai. From Gorahai, the Italians deployed 120 miles up the Fafan valley to Degehabur. Attacks by the troops of Nasibu Zeamanuel against Graziani’s rear units forced the column to return to Gorahai. Meanwhile, another Italian column under Pietro Maletti advanced to Degehabur but had to withdraw just north of Gorahai after a deadly ambush. By late 1935, Graziani, disposing of a small number of troops, remained largely on the defensive, also being effectively blocked by the army of Nasibu in Hararghe and the army of Desta Damtew in Sidamo. Heavy rains also contributed to Graziani’s lack of progress.

In November 1935, Brigadier General Oreste Mariotti penetrated the Danakil Desert from Kulul after being assembled at the Eritrean port of Fatima Eri. Securing the left flank of the Italian army, Mariotti and his troops marched across the desert, ascended the Tigrean plateau, where they repelled an attack of Dejazmach Kasa Sebhat's troops on 12–13 November at Atsbi. The force then continued to Mekelle, where it joined the troops of I Corps.

On 11 November, De Bono received an order from Mussolini to have Maravigna's II Corps advance beyond the Tekezé and to push Pirzio Biroli's indigenous corps towards Amba Alagi. De Bono reacted strongly; his reply to Mussolini was firm and focused on the serious logistical difficulties facing the Italian forces, which were simultaneously reinforcing positions, guarding hundreds of kilometers of territory, and continuing road construction. Although Mussolini initially acknowledged the validity of De Bono's arguments, on 14 November he informed the general of his dismissal and replaced him as commander of the forces in East Africa with Marshal Pietro Badoglio. On November 17, 20,000 men of Ras Kassa Haile Darge joined Ras Seyoum's 15,000 Tigrayans in the Mai Mescic valley south of Amba Aradam. These forces were discovered on the 18th by the Regia Aeronautica, which promptly attacked them, though without significant results; the 20 aircraft involved were hindered by Oerlikon cannons and by the ability of the Ethiopians to disperse rapidly across the terrain, thereby limiting losses.

On November 18, Italy was then hit by economic sanctions approved by 50 member states of the League of Nations, with only Italy voting against and Austria, Hungary and Albania abstaining. These sanctions proved to be weak: the United Kingdom did not block the Suez Canal to Italian ships, allowing the war to continue and the Italian economy did not suffer, because the sanctions did not concern vitally important materials such as oil, coal and steel, which could be easily circumvented by obtaining supplies from the United States of America who was not a member of the League. The war became wildly popular with the Italian people, who relished Mussolini's defiance of the League as an example of Italian greatness. Kallis wrote, "Especially after the imposition of sanctions in November 1935, the popularity of the Fascist regime reached unprecedented heights". The Italian regime then organized a domestic mobilization known as Oro alla Patria, a fundraising campaign organized on 18 December in response to the sanctions, during which Italians donated their gold to the state to support the costs of the war in Ethiopia. In Rome alone, more than 250,000 rings were collected, while about 180,000 were gathered in Milan, amid other personal gold jewelry and objects totaling 57,114,395 kilograms of gold and 360,618,470 of silver. In early December 1935, the Hoare–Laval Pact was proposed by Britain and France as a final attempt at reconciliation. Italy would gain the best parts of Ogaden and Tigray and economic influence over all the south. Mussolini demanded more concessions while Ethiopia completely rejected it. On 13 December, details of the pact were leaked by a French newspaper and British Foreign Secretary Sir Samuel Hoare was forced to resign in disgrace.

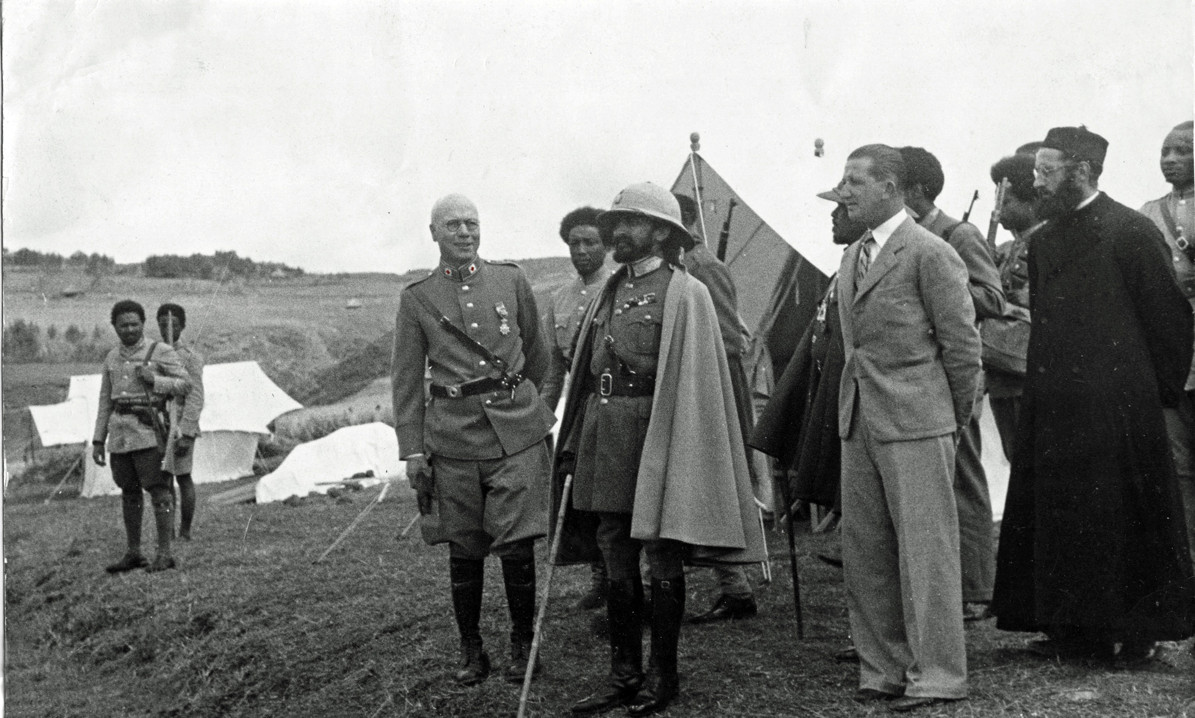
Haile Selassie with Red Cross members

In early December 1935, the Ethiopian army completed its mobilization and prepared to launch the Christmas Offensive, which was intended to split the Italian forces in the north with the Ethiopian centre and to invade Eritrea with the Ethiopian left. The offensive began on 15 December, when 20,000 soldiers of Ras Imru Haile Selassie advancing from Begemder attacked the thin Italian defensive line along the Tekezé River held by the four battalions of Blackshirts led by General Filippo Diamanti. In the following days, there were fierce battles at the Dembeguina Pass with heavy losses for both sides. Seeing the Ethiopians break through the Italian lines, Captain Carlo Emanuele Basile immediately ordered a retreat from Shire to Selekleka, which was garrisoned by the 24th Infantry Division. From here, the retreat of the Italian forces continued to Axum where they were reinforced by the 2nd Eritrean Division and the 2nd CC.NN. Division. Ras Seyoum Mengesha's army attempted an assault in Tembien, at Abiy Addi, which Colonel Ruggero Tracchia's men initially repelled thanks to their superior firepower, but they eventually had to withdraw from Abiy Addi on 27 December.

Having spent a decade accumulating poison gas in East Africa, Mussolini gave Badoglio authority to resort to using chemical weapons (OC 23/06, 28 December 1935). (Note: Years later, Badoglio admitted to using gas once and a former government minister said that three gas bombs had been dropped, but these admissions came after copious amounts of records had been published showing that gas had been used to a much greater extent.) The military directive had also called for a ruthless "take no prisoners" policy and the "complete destruction of the Abyssinian armies." From 22 December to 18 January, as the Ethiopian armies recaptured southern Tembien and were approaching Mekelle, over 2,000 quintals of gas were dropped on Tigray, in particular in the Tekezé area: in this way, soldiers and civilians who used those waters to quench their thirst were indiscriminately hit. To justify the use of gas, Italian authorities referred to the brutal killing of Italian airman, Second Lieutenant Tito Minniti, who was captured, killed, and mutilated after his aircraft had crashed behind enemy lines on 26 December. On 1 January 1936, Colonial Minister Alessandro Lessona approved the use of chemical weapons on the Ethiopians, writing that they constituted a "highly justified act of reprisal for the infamy committed against our aviator".

=== Second Italian advance ===
A map showing the military actions from February to May 1936

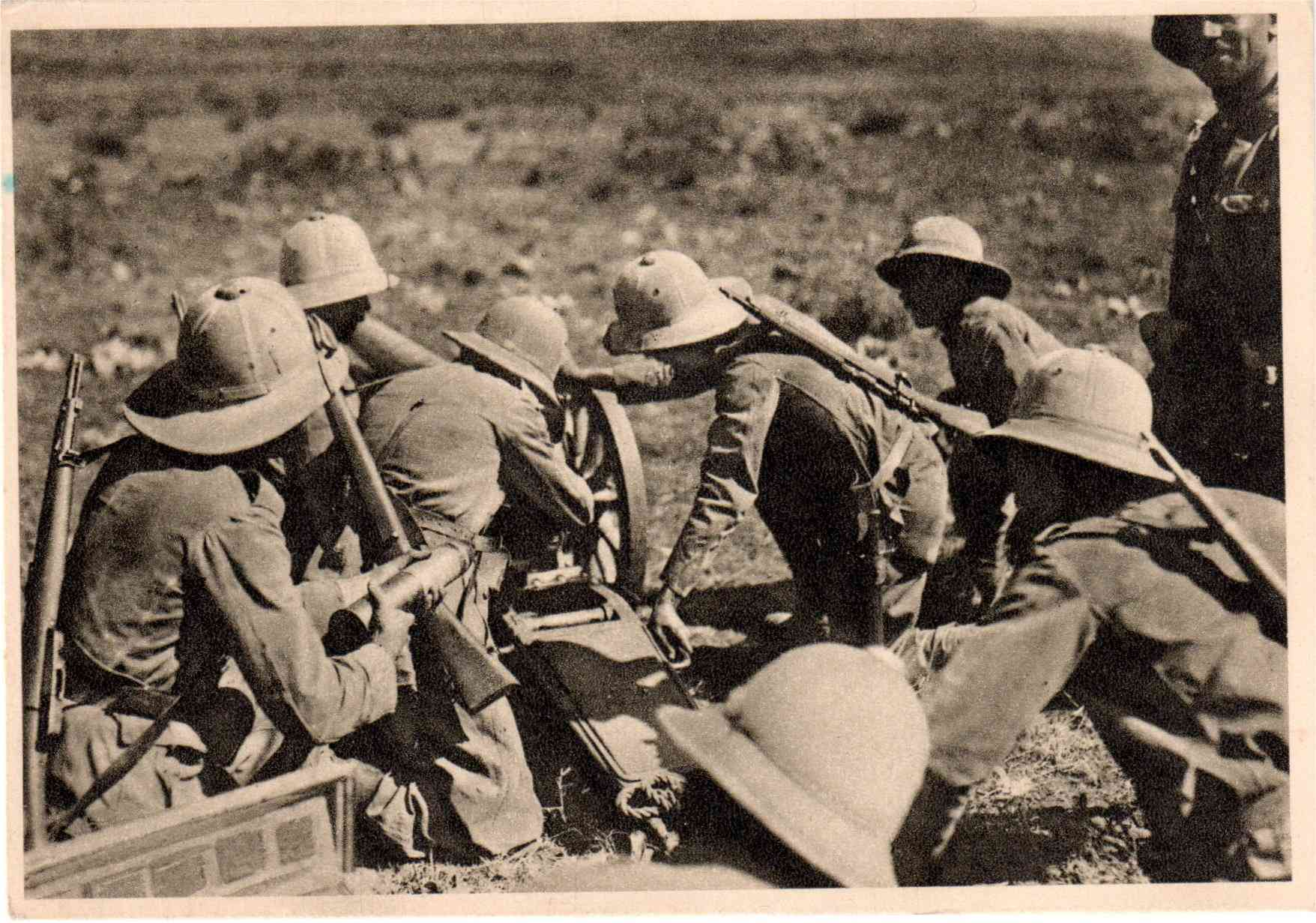
Italian soldiers with a field gun

As the progress of the Christmas Offensive slowed, Italian plans to renew the advance on the northern front began as Mussolini had given permission to use poison gas and Badoglio received the Italian III Corps under General Ettore Bastico and the Italian IV Corps under General Ezio Babbini. Late in the previous year, Ras Desta Damtew assembled up his army in the area around Dolo to invade Italian Somaliland. Between 12 and 16 January 1936, at the Battle of Genale Doria, after defeating a small counterattack, the Italians under Marshal Rodolfo Graziani advanced in three columns, with air support using explosives and gas, crushing the Ethiopian forces. By 19 January, Italian vanguards entered Negele Borana, marking the first major Italian victory in the campaign and the near-total destruction of Desta's army.

In mid-January, the armies of Ras Kassa Haile Darge and Ras Seyoum Mengesha entered Tembien aiming to split the Italian forces at Mekelle, but their plan was too ambitious for poorly supplied troops. Pietro Badoglio countered by advancing the III and II Corps to block their flanks. During the battle, disaster was narrowly avoided at the Warieu Pass when the forces of Ras Kassa managed to encircle elements of the 2nd CC.NN. Division, but the Blackshirts held with support from air attacks using mustard gas and broke the encirclement by 24 January. As a result, the First Battle of Tembien ended inconclusively. On 30 January 1936, Mussolini warned the Italian public that at least another year would be required to complete the conquest of Ethiopia.

At the beginning of February, Badoglio launched an offensive against Ras Mulugeta Yeggazu's forces, concentrated on Amba Aradam, numbered approximately 80,000 men. On 10 February 1936, General Ruggero Santini's I Corps and General Ettore Bastico's III Corps began their encirclement of the Amba Aradam massif under a heavy thunderstorm. Ras Mulugeta's army did not appear until 12 February, when it engaged the Blackshirts of the 4th CC.NN. Division under General Alessandro Traditi on the left. On the right, the Ethiopians attacked the III Corps, seriously engaging General Francesco Bertini's 27th Infantry Division on the Dansa-Bet Quinet slopes. Between 13 and 14 February, Italian forces consolidated their positions and prepared for the final assault, while Ethiopian forces were barely able to mount a counterattack. Badoglio's forces advanced systematically, and Mulugeta ordered a retreat on 15 February. By the evening, Italian forces rejoined behind Amba Aradam as Ethiopian troops retreated chaotically toward Amba Alagi and Shire. On 16 February, Badoglio ordered air attacks on the remnants of Mulugeta's army, which continued until 19 February, concluding with the capture of Amba Aradam and the dissolution of Mulugeta's forces. Ras Mulugeta and his son were killed on 26 February by a band of Azebo Oromo brigands that slaughtered Ethiopian stragglers struggling to return home.

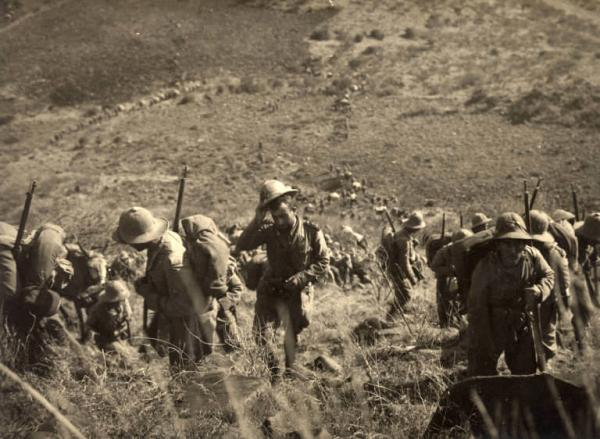
The 3rd Battalion of the 27th Infantry Division during the Battle of Amba Aradam, February 1936

As the attack on Amba Aradam ended, Haile Selassie left Dessie on 20 February to regroup scattered forces and link up with Ras Kassa Haile Darge and Ras Seyoum Mengesha retreating from Tembien to Amba Alagi. Meanwhile, Badoglio launched a pincer attack on the armies of Kassa and Seyoum. Amid confusion and indecision in the Ethiopian command, Italian forces under Ettore Bastico and Alessandro Pirzio Biroli advanced rapidly, capturing key positions such as Amba Alagi in an attempt to surround the armies of Ras Kassa and Ras Seyoum near Abiy Addi. On 29 February, the Ethiopians began a general retreat, but it was too late and about a third of them were surrounded while the remainder was unable to stay united as they withdrew, marking the end of the Second Battle of Tembien.

From 28 February to early March, the Italian II and IV Corps moved against Ras Imru at the Battle of Shire, facing strong resistance at Selekleka and the Af Gagà pass but ultimately forcing a retreat. Badoglio, seeing Ras Imru's army slip away, immediately ordered the air force to employ all available means to hunt down the enemy forces. On 3 and 4 March, one hundred and twenty fighters and bombers bombarded the Ethiopian forces as they crossed the Tekezé River, with 63,600 kilograms of explosives, mustard gas, and incendiary bombs, decimating Imru's troops, who suffered between 3,000 and 5,000 casualties among his army. On 3 March, Haile Selassie reached Korem, trying to muster forces. There, he learned that Mulugeta and his sons were dead, Amba Alagi had fallen to the Italians, the Azebo Galla revolted, and desertions plagued his troops.

After a series of Italian victories in Tigray, the war turned decisively in Italy's favor. While Ethiopian forces retreated in disarray, the I Corps and the Eritrean Corps advanced toward the Maychew basin to confront Haile Selassie. The Emperor could muster only about 30,000–35,000 men and chose to make a decisive stand, in keeping with Ethiopian tradition that required the monarch to lead in the final battle. He scheduled the attack for 31 March, also influenced by reports that Italian forces at Maychew were still limited in number. On 20 March, Haile Selassie moved from Korem to Amba Aia, where he met his commanders to plan the offensive. By the time the Ethiopians advanced, about 31,000 troops in three columns faced roughly 40,000 Italian and colonial forces under Generals Ruggero Santini and Alessandro Pirzio Biroli, with superior firepower and air support. These delays proved decisive, enabling the Italians to reinforce the front, continue aerial bombardment, and gather intelligence on Ethiopian movements.

On 31 March 1936, the final Ethiopian offensive ordered by Haile Selassie began, marking the beginning of the Battle of Maychew. Ethiopian troops launched repeated assaults, aiming to break the Italian lines. Despite initial gains, the Italian 1st Army Corps, supported by artillery and a decisive intervention from the Regia Aeronautica, halted their advance. By midday, the Italian Alpini and Eritrean askari units launched counterattacks, recapturing lost ground after intense fighting. On 1 April, after a final Ethiopian attack was easily repulsed, Haile Selassie ordered his remaining 20,000 demoralized and disorganized men to retreat towards the heights of Korem. Badoglio, having learned that the Ethiopians were retreating, ordered the Regia Aeronautica to strike the retreating Ethiopians on the basin of Lake Ashenge, who were continually harassed by Azebo Galla irregulars and the artillery of the 1st Eritrean Division under General Gustavo Pesenti. On 4 April, the Air Bombing Brigade under General Vincenzo Magliocco dropped 700 quintals of bombs (including mustard gas) on the routing Ethiopians, who were completely exposed and without air cover, resulting in the massacre of thousands of Ethiopian soldiers.

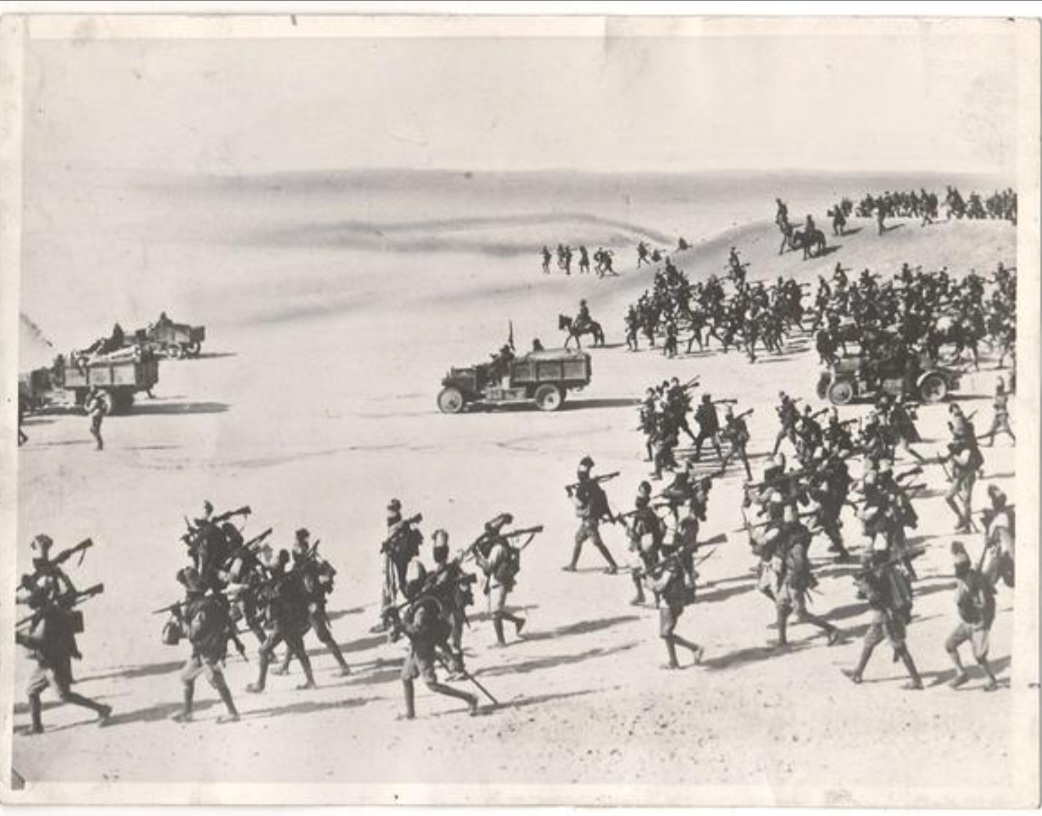
Column of Italian colonial troops and vehicles in Ethiopia

The defeat at Maychew and the subsequent massacre at Lake Ashenge led to the complete dissolution of the Ethiopian army on the northern front as the demoralized troops began to desert in large numbers, which cleared the way for the Italian troops. Taking advantage of the collapse of the Ethiopian armies, the East African Fast Column (Colonna Celere dell'Africa Orientale) of General Achille Starace, composed of some 3,000 troops on more than 400 vehicles occupied Gondar on 1 April, and soon took the region around Lake Tana. Additionally, an Italian column deployed from Beilul captured Aussa on the same day, a town that controlled one of the main caravan routes to Addis Ababa. After a lull in the Southern front, on 14 April, Graziani launched an offensive against Ras Nasibu Emmanual to defeat the last Ethiopian army in the field at the Battle of the Ogaden. The Ethiopians were drawn up behind a defensive line that was termed the "Hindenburg Wall", designed by Wehib Pasha, a seasoned ex-Ottoman commander. Despite strong Ethiopian resistance and heavy losses for the Italians, Graziani's forces, supported by air power, broke through the defenses by 25 April and forced an Ethiopian retreat; 2,000 Italian soldiers and 5,000 Ethiopian soldiers were killed or wounded.

=== Fall of Addis Ababa ===
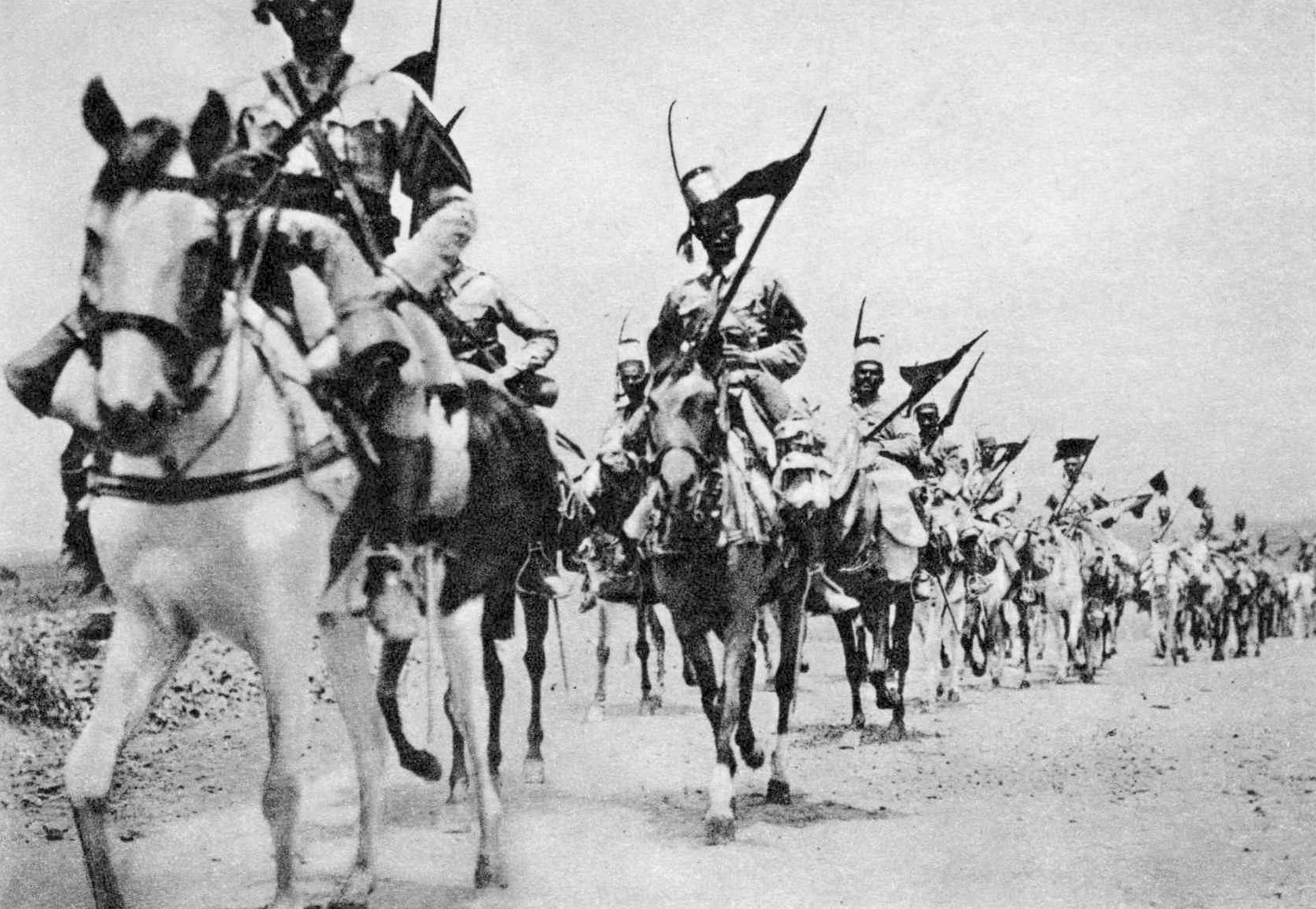
Italian colonial troops advance on Addis Ababa

On April 9, after a three-day stop at Korem, 30,000 men of the Eritrean Corps under the command of Alessandro Pirzio Biroli set out towards Dessie. Hindered by bad weather and the high mortality rate among pack animals, they managed to enter Dessie without encountering any resistance on the morning of 15 April, which had been hastily abandoned a few hours earlier by Crown Prince Asfa Wossen. Selassie, after having eluded the Italians through night marches, managed to escape by entering the holy city of Lalibela on 13 April where he stopped for two days and then rejoined the remains of the retreating army on the 15th. Having reached Dessie on the 22nd, the emperor learned that the city had already fallen to the Italians a few days earlier. Selassie then ordered a retreat to Were Ilu, but an Italian cavalry unit had already occupied the town. Realizing that he was now behind enemy lines, Selassie continued his retreat using impervious tracks unknown to the Italians.

On 26 April 1936, Badoglio began the "March of the Iron Will" from Dessie to Addis Ababa, an advance with a mechanised column against slight Ethiopian resistance. The march was organised into three columns: one made up of motorized units from the 30th Infantry Division under the command of General Italo Gariboldi and one composed of Eritrean battalions under Colonel De Meo, which travelled along the imperial road Dessie-Debre Berhan for a distance of approximately 400 kilometres. A third column under the command of General Sebastiano Gallina, comprising four battalions of the 1st Eritrean Division followed the 310 kilometre Dessie-Were Ilu route. Badoglio did not want to expose himself to any risk, and to prevent Gariboldi's enormous column (12,495 men) from having to face unexpected ambushes, the Eritreans were sent as a vanguard. The only real obstacle during the march occurred on 29 April near the Termaber Pass, where the Ethiopians blew up the road near a narrow bend, slowing the enemy's advance. The incident caused a delay of about 36 hours in Badoglio's plans, who, during the forced stop, learned that the Party Secretary Achille Starace had entered Debre Tabor on the 28th, while Graziani had reached Degehabur on the 30th.

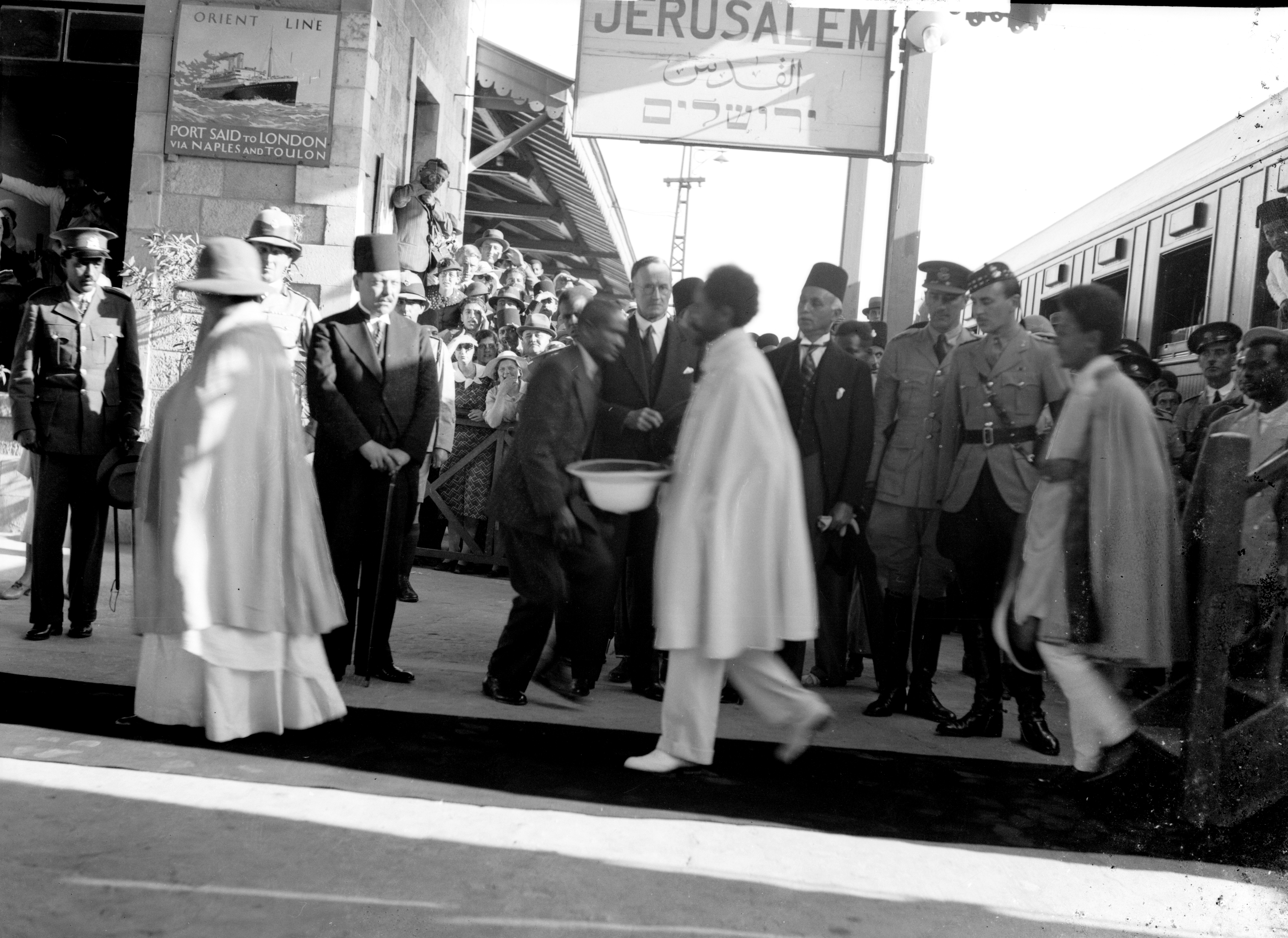
Haile Selassie passes through Jerusalem on his way to exile in Britain.

After having travelled 550 km and managing to slip past enemy lines, Selassie reached the capital on 30 April. The following day Ras Kassa Haile Darge suggested that the Emperor should go to Geneva to appeal to the League of Nations for assistance before returning to lead resistance against the Italians. The view was subsequently adopted by Selassie and preparations were made for his departure. On 2 May, Selassie boarded a train from Addis Ababa to Djibouti, with the gold of the Ethiopian Central Bank. From there he fled to the United Kingdom, with the tacit acquiescence of the Italians who could have bombed his train, into exile. Before he departed, Selassie ordered that the government of Ethiopia be moved to Gore and Imru Haile Selassie was appointed Prince Regent during his absence. After the Emperor left Addis Ababa to go into exile, rioters rampaged throughout the city, looting and setting fire to much of the capital, which killed several hundred people. Concerned for the safety of its citizens, the French government urged Mussolini to occupy the Ethiopian capital as soon as possible in order to re-establish order.

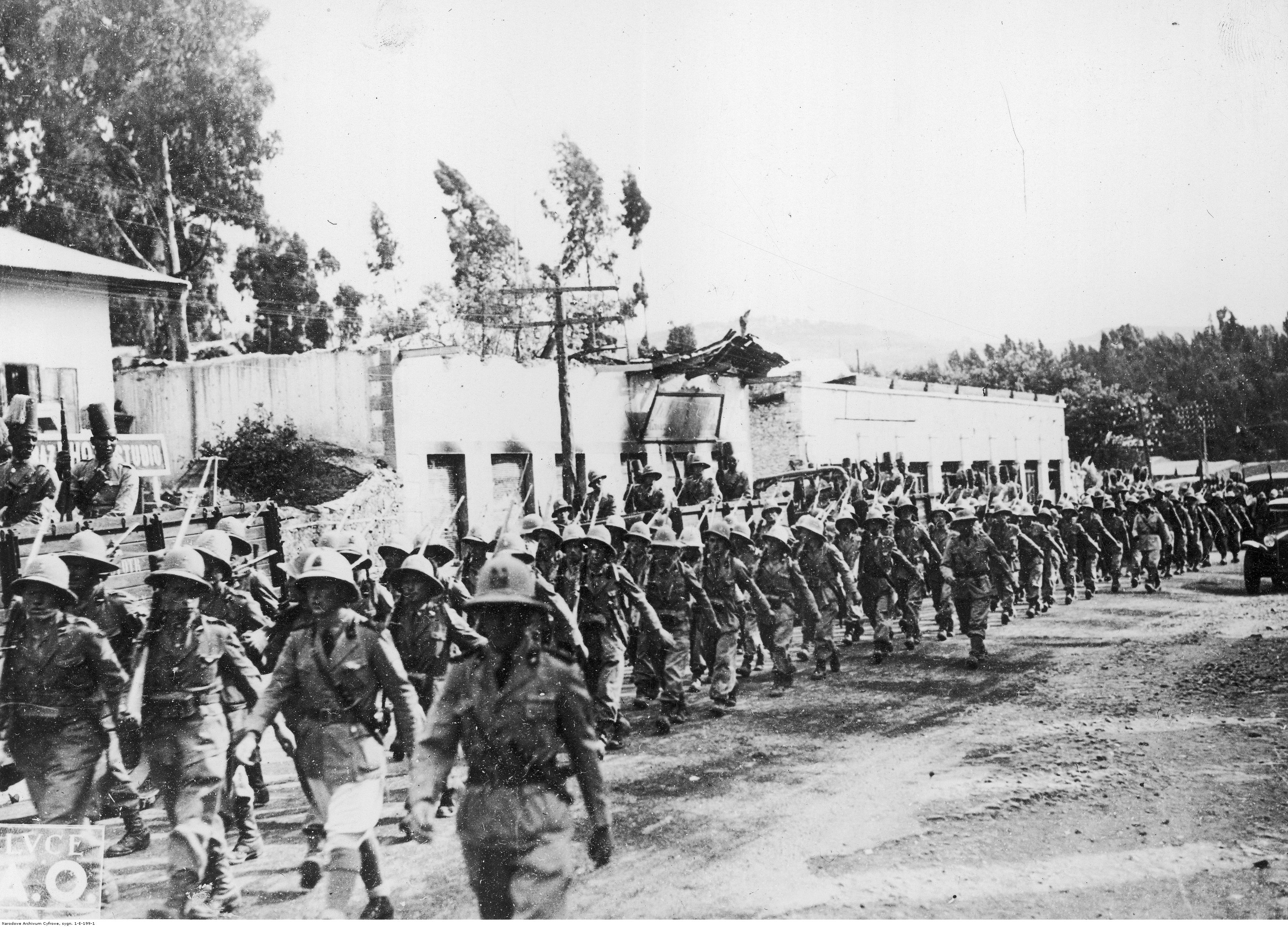
Italian troops in Addis Ababa, 1936

General Gallina could have taken the capital by 2 May, but Mussolini ordered that only Italian troops and not askaris make the official entry, causing a three-day delay. At 4pm on 5 May, Badoglio drove into the city at the head of Gariboldi's motorized column. Patrols of Italian troops were sent to occupy tactically valuable areas in the city and execute anyone suspected of having taken part in the looting. Badoglio then decided to send to Rome a telegram announcing the capture of the capital: "Today, 5 May, at 4pm, at the head of the victorious troops, I entered Addis Ababa." That same day, Mussolini announced in a short speech the end of the war and celebrated the victory as a triumph of Italian power, unity, and imperial ambition.

On the evening of 9 May 1936, after sirens had called the population to assemble throughout the country, Mussolini appeared on the balcony of Palazzo Venezia and delivered the proclamation of the Italian Empire to a large crowd of 200,000 people. During the speech, Mussolini stated that "the destiny of Ethiopia has been sealed today" and "Italy at last has her empire". On the same day, the Grand Council of Fascism recognized Mussolini with the title of "Founder of the Empire," which Achille Starace promptly incorporated into the official formula of the "salute to the Duce." From that moment, and for many months afterward, the press and leading political and cultural figures engaged in continuous glorification of Mussolini's image, to the point that General Enrico Caviglia observed that Mussolini was drawn into a climate of flattering rhetoric "which dangerously accentuated the already extreme confidence he had in his own political ability."

== Aftermath ==
=== Subsequent events and operations, 1936–1937 ===
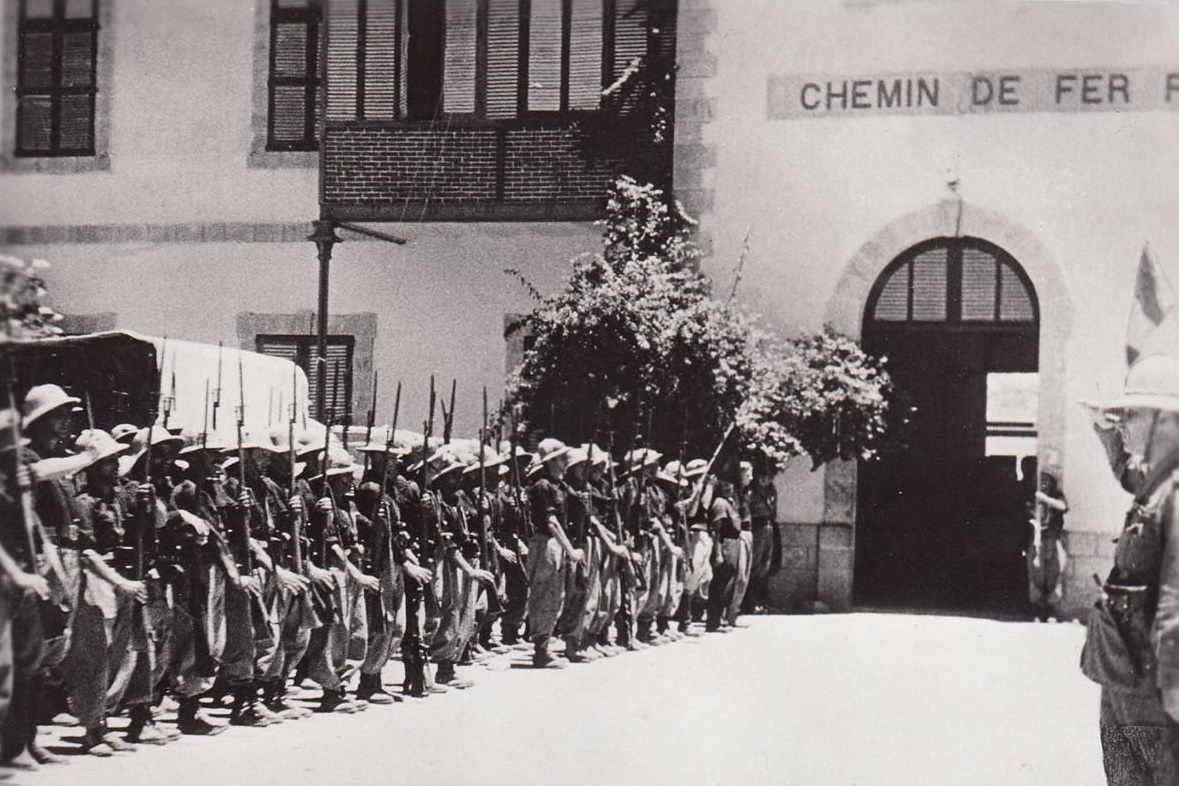
Italian Blackshirts in Dire Dawa, May 1936

Despite the capture of Addis Ababa and the proclamation of the Empire, Italian troops were facing serious difficulties. The rainy season hindered operations and the vast arid regions of south-western Ethiopia, almost devoid of communication routes, had not yet been occupied by the Italians. In this vast territory the remnants of the Ethiopian army were still active, consisting of approximately 40,000–50,000 men. On 10 May 1936, Italian troops from the northern front and from the southern front met at Dire Dawa. The Italians found the recently released Ethiopian Ras, Hailu Tekle Haymanot, who boarded a train back to Addis Ababa and approached the Italian invaders in submission. The remnants of the Ethiopian army under Imru Haile Selassie fell back to Gore in western Ethiopia to reorganise a new provisional government and continue the resistance against the Italians. The exiled government in Gore was never able to provide any meaningful leadership to the remaining military formations but sporadic resistance by independent groups persisted around the capital.

On 1 June 1936, the Italian government officially unified the three territories of Ethiopia, Eritrea, and Somalia into a single legal and political entity designated Italian East Africa, Badoglio became the first Viceroy of Italian East Africa but on 11 June, he was replaced by Marshal Rodolfo Graziani. Marshal Graziani sent a small air expedition to Nekemte to convince an Oromo chief to submit to the Italian forces in order to establish an Italian garrison in the western region, which would facilitate the conquest of western Ethiopia. However, on the night of 26–27 June, Ethiopian guerrillas attacked the expedition during the Lechemti Massacre after it landed in Nekemte, destroying three Italian aircraft and killing twelve Italian officials, including Air Marshal Vincenzo Magliocco (the deputy viceroy of Italian East Africa) and aviator Antonio Locatelli. Graziani ordered the town to be bombed in retaliation for the killings.

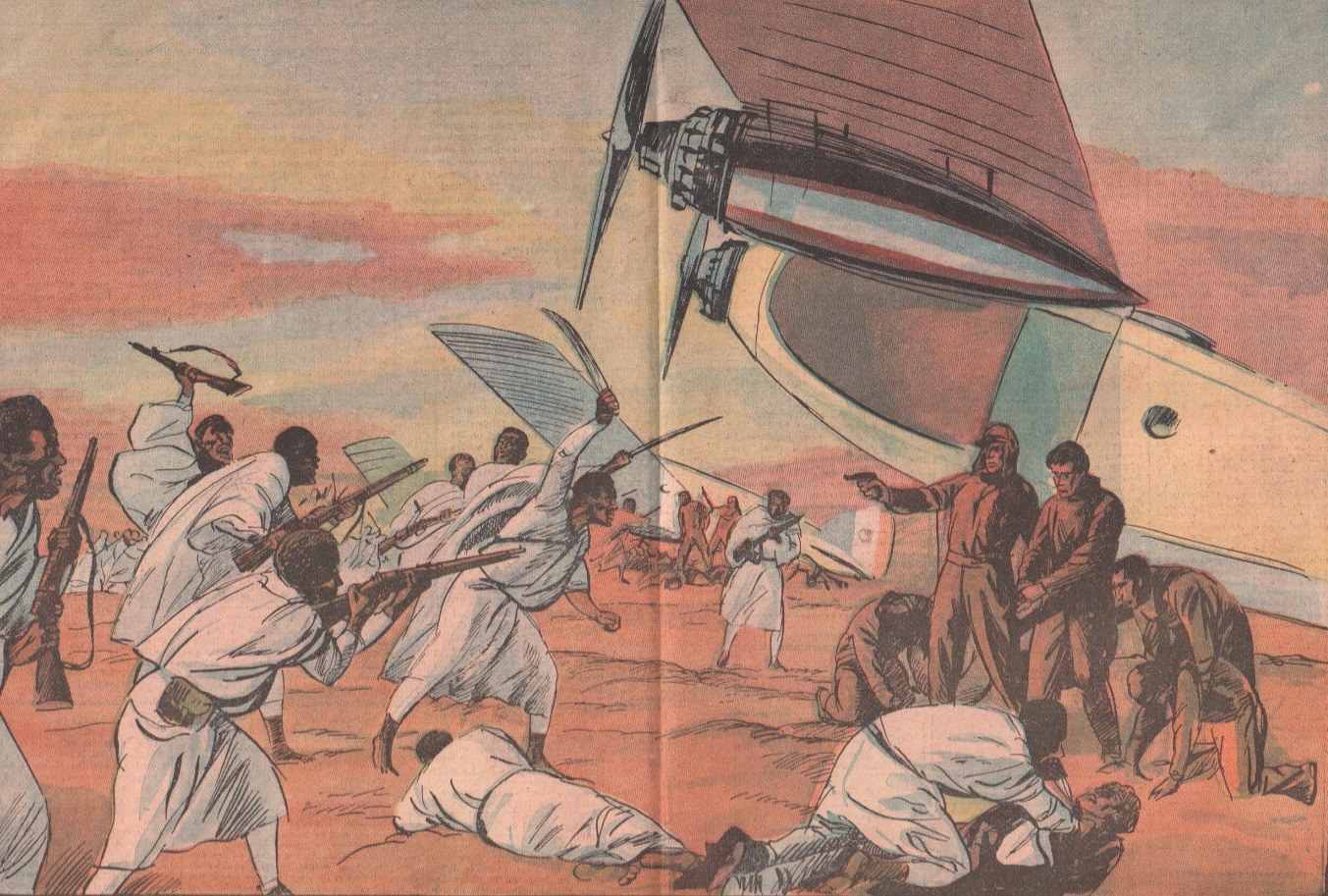
Illustration of the Lechemti Massacre

The situation in Addis Ababa in the first months after its capture was difficult for the Italians. Communications were possible only via the long route from Somalia, while violence and disorder were widespread in the city. Marshal Graziani, initially with only 9,000 troops at his disposal, feared an attack by Ethiopian guerrillas, reported to be "all around Addis Ababa," and rumors circulated that thousands of Ethiopian guerrillas were preparing to strike. On 28 July, remnants of the Ethiopian army under the brothers Wondosson, Asfawossen and Aberra Kassa supported by the irregulars of Abebe Aregai and Mesfin Sileshi attacked Addis Ababa. The Ethiopians advanced into the centre of Addis Ababa where they unleashed panic, however the 30th Infantry Division "Sabauda" under General Italo Gariboldi and the 1st Eritrean Mixed Brigade under General Sebastiano Gallina eventually forced them to retreat on 30 July.

After the end of the rainy season, an Italian column led by Carlo Geloso left Addis Ababa in September and occupied most of western Ethiopia a month later, including Gore and Nekemte. The forces of Ras Imru were trapped between the Italians and the Gojeb River and Imru surrendered on 19 December. That same day, Wondosson Kassa was captured and executed near Debre Zebit and on 21 December, Aberra Kassa and Asfawossen Kassa were executed in Fikke. Imru was flown to Italy and imprisoned on the Island of Ponza, while the rest of the Ethiopian prisoners taken in the war were dispersed in camps in East Africa and Italy. A second column went south-west to attack the last remnants of the old Ethiopian army under Ras Desta Damtew who had assembled forces in the Great Lakes district. The Ethiopians were defeated on 16 December and by January, the Italians had established a measure of control over the provinces of Sidamo, Kaffa and Arsi. After another two months, the remaining Ethiopians were surrounded and fought on, rather than surrender. On 19 February 1937 the last battle occurred when remnants of the old Ethiopian army under Ras Desta clashed with Italian forces at Gogetti, and were defeated. An estimated 4,000 Ethiopians were reportedly killed in the engagement, 1,600 of whom—including Damtew—after being taken prisoner.

=== Addis Ababa massacre ===
That same date, 19 February 1937 – Yekatit 12 according to the Ge'ez calendar – saw the attempted assassination of Marshal Rodolfo Graziani by Eritrean rebels Abraham Deboch and Mogos Asgedom in Addis Ababa. The campaign of reprisals visited by the Italians upon the population of Addis Ababa has been described as the worst massacre in Ethiopian history. Estimates vary on the number of people killed in the three days that followed the attempt on Graziani's life. Ethiopian sources estimated that 30,000 people were killed by the Italians, while Italian sources claimed that only a few hundred were killed. A 2017 history of the massacre estimated that 19,200 people were killed, 20 percent of the population of Addis Ababa. Over the following week, numerous Ethiopians suspected of opposing Italian rule were rounded up and executed, including members of the Black Lions and other members of the aristocracy. Many more were imprisoned, even collaborators such as Ras Gebre Haywot, the son of Ras Mikael of Wollo, Brehane Markos, and Ayale Gebre, who had helped the Italians identify the two men who made the attempt on Graziani's life.

According to Mockler, "Italian carabinieri had fired into the crowds of beggars and poor assembled for the distribution of alms; and it is said that the Federal Secretary, Guido Cortese, even fired his revolver into the group of Ethiopian dignitaries standing around him." Hours later, Cortese gave the fatal order:

Comrades, today is the day when we should show our devotion to our Viceroy by reacting and destroying the Ethiopians for three days. For three days I give you ''carte blanche'' to destroy and kill and do what you want to the Ethiopians.

Italians doused native houses with petrol and set them on fire. They broke into the homes of local Greeks and Armenians and lynched their servants. Some even posed on the corpses of their victims to have their photographs taken.

=== New government of the Duke of Aosta, 1937–1940 ===
On 21 December 1937, Rome appointed Amedeo, 3rd Duke of Aosta, as the new Viceroy and Governor General of Italian East Africa with instructions to take a more conciliatory line. Aosta instituted public works projects including 3,200 km (2,000 mi) of new paved roadways, 25 hospitals, 14 hotels, dozens of post offices, telephone exchanges, aqueducts, schools and shops. The Italians decreed miscegenation to be illegal. Racial separation, including residential segregation, was enforced as thoroughly as possible and the Italians showed favouritism to non-Christian groups.

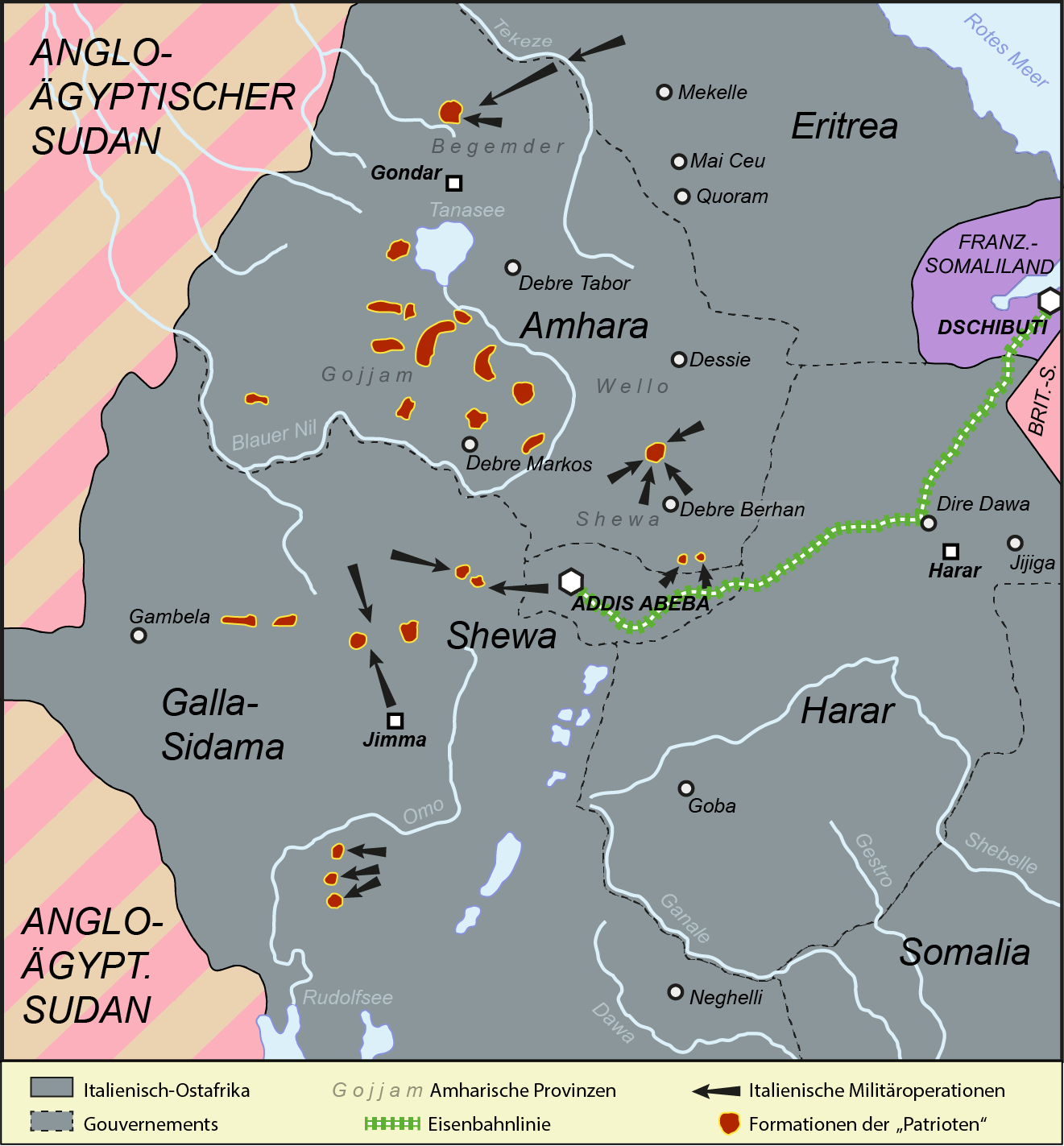
Areas of Arbegnoch resistance in 1937

To isolate the dominant Amhara rulers of Ethiopia, who supported Selassie, the Italians granted the Oromos, the Somalis and other Muslims, many of whom had supported the invasion, autonomy and rights. The Italians also definitively abolished slavery and abrogated feudal laws that had been upheld by the Amharas. Early in 1938, a revolt broke out in Gojjam, led by the Committee of Unity and Collaboration, made up of some of the young, educated elite who had escaped reprisals after the assassination attempt on Graziani. The General oversaw another wave of reprisals and had all Ethiopians in administrative jobs murdered, some by being thrown from aircraft, after being taken on board under the pretext of visiting the King in Rome, leading to the saying "He went to Rome".

The army in East Africa had 150,000 men but was spread thinly; by 1941 the garrison had been increased to 250,000 soldiers, including 75,000 Italian civilians. The former police chief of Addis Ababa, Abebe Aregai, was the most successful leader of the Ethiopian guerrilla movement after 1937, using units of fifty men. On 11 December, the League of Nations voted to condemn Italy and Mussolini withdrew from the League. Along with world condemnation, the occupation was expensive, the budget for AOI from 1936 to 1937 required 19,136 billion lire for infrastructure, when the annual revenue of Italy was only 18,581 billion lire.

=== East African campaign, 1940–1941 ===
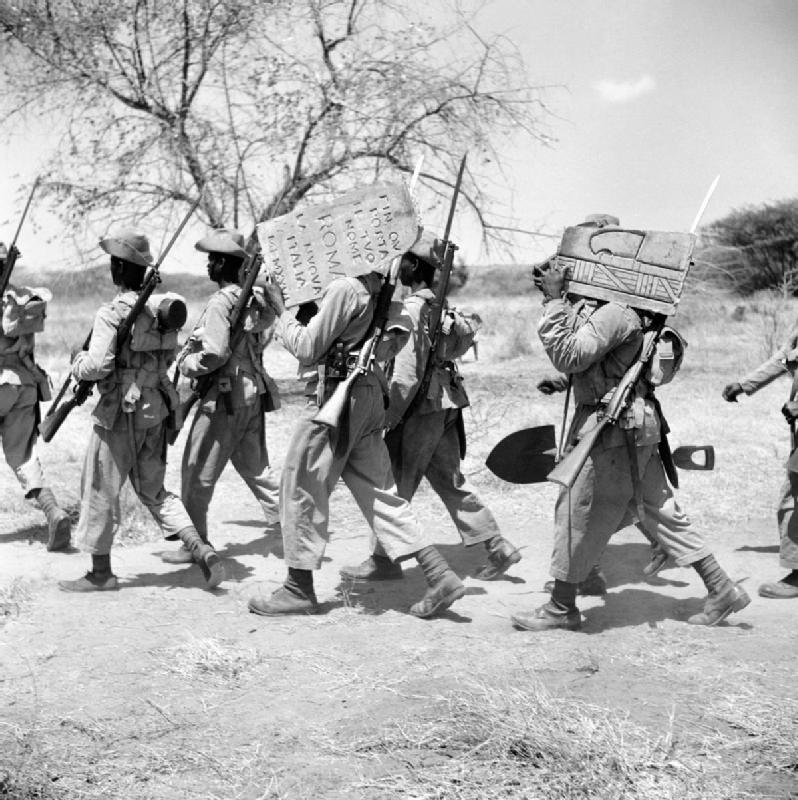
Soldiers of the West African Frontier Force removing Italian frontier markers from the Kenya–Italian Somaliland border, 1941

While in exile in the United Kingdom, Haile Selassie had sought the support of the Western democracies for his cause but had little success until the Second World War began. On 10 June 1940, Mussolini declared war on France and Britain and attacked British and Commonwealth forces in Egypt, Sudan, Kenya and British Somaliland. In August 1940, the Italian conquest of British Somaliland was completed. The British and Selassie incited Ethiopian and other local forces to join a campaign to dislodge the Italians from Ethiopia. Selassie went to Khartoum to establish closer liaison with the British and resistance forces within Ethiopia. On 18 January 1941, Selassie crossed the border into Ethiopia near the village of Um Iddla and two days later rendezvoused with Gideon Force. The Allied East Africa Command and Ethiopian patriots had largely succeeded in their operations by 6 April 1941, when Addis Ababa was occupied by Harry Wetherall, Dan Pienaar and Charles Fowkes, who received the surrender of the city; on 5 May, exactly five years after the fall of the capital, Selassie made a formal entry in Addis Ababa. After the Italian defeat, the Italian guerrilla war in Ethiopia was carried out by remnants of Italian troops and their allies, which lasted until the Armistice between Italy and Allied armed forces in September 1943.

The treaties signed in Paris by the Italian Republic (Repubblica Italiana) and the victorious powers of World War II on 10 February 1947, included formal Italian recognition of Ethiopian independence and an agreement to pay $25,000,000 (equivalent to $360,469,000 in 2025) in reparations. Since the League of Nations and most of its members had never officially recognized Italian sovereignty over Ethiopia, Haile Selassie had been recognized as the restored emperor of Ethiopia following his formal entry into Addis Ababa in May 1941. Ethiopia presented a bill to the Economic Commission for Italy of £184,746,023 for damages inflicted during the course of the Italian occupation. The list included the destruction of 2,000 churches, 535,000 houses, the slaughter or theft of 5,000,000 cattle, 7,000,000 sheep and goats, 1,000,000 horses and mules and 700,000 camels.

== Casualties ==
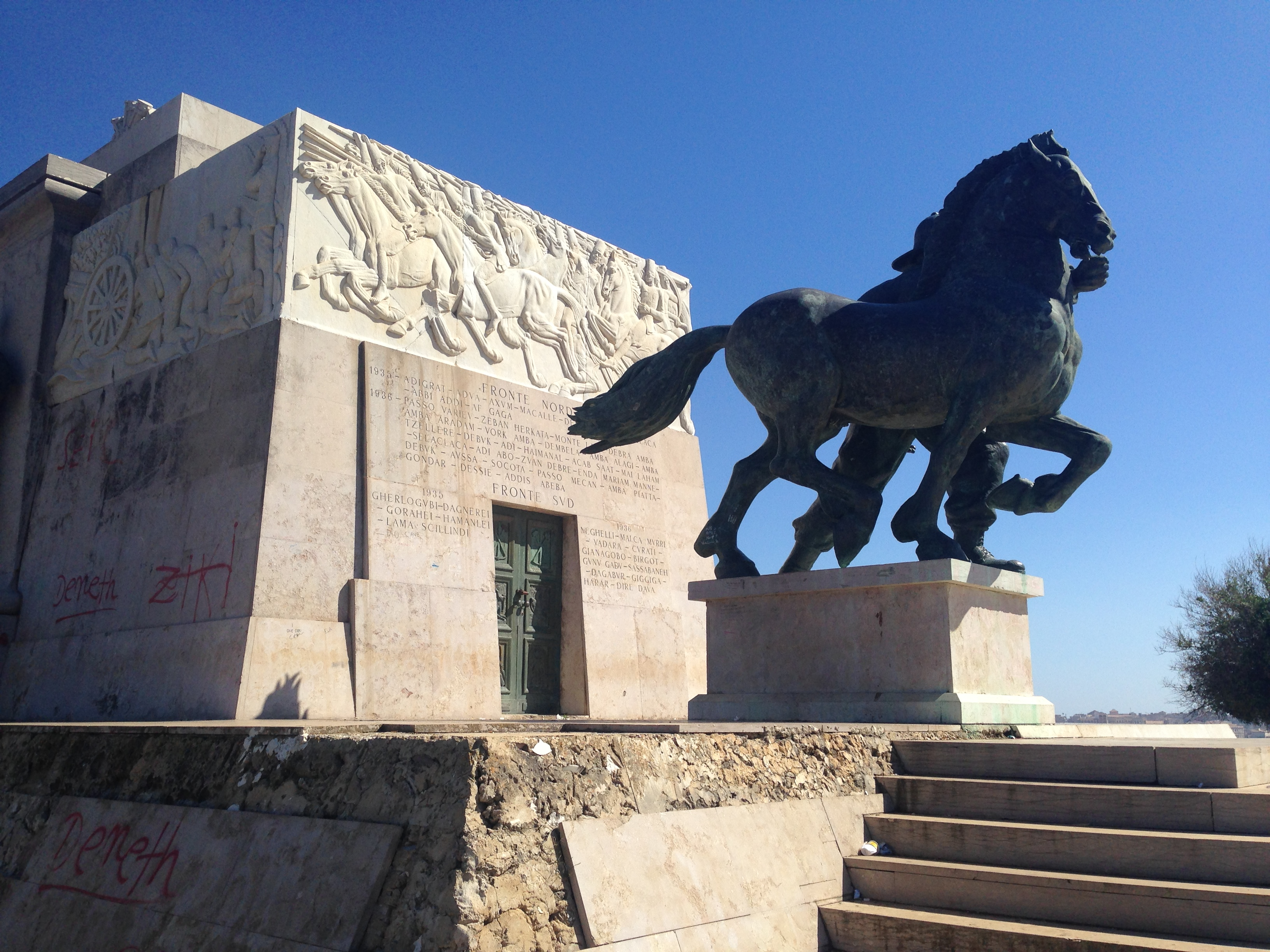
Monument to the Italians Fallen in Africa, a large memorial in Syracuse dedicated to the Italians who died during the Ethiopian campaign

According to an official statement published in the Gazzetta del Popolo on 3 June 1936, from 1 January 1935 to 31 May 1936, the Italian army and Blackshirt units lost 1,148 men killed, 125 men died of wounds and thirty-one missing; about 1,593 Eritrean troops and 453 civilian workmen were also killed, a total of 3,319 casualties. In a 1978 publication, Alberto Sbacchi wrote that these official Italian casualty figures of about 3,000 were an underestimate. Sbacchi wrote that the official total of Italian casualties was unreliable, because the regime desired to underestimate Italian losses.

Angelo Del Boca estimates the total Italian losses up to 31 December 1936 (including more than six months of guerrilla warfare after the end of the conflict) speak of 2,317 dead for the Italian army, 1,165 for the Blackshirts, 193 from the air force, 56 from the navy, 78 civilians in the Gondrand shipyard massacre, 453 logistic workers and 88 merchant marines, for a total of 3,731 Italian soldiers and 619 civilians killed. To these figures must be added approximately 9,000 injured and 18,200 repatriated due to illness. Estimates on the losses of the askaris, however very vague, he puts it at 4,500 killed. From 1936 to 1940, there was an additional 9,555 men killed and 144,000 sick and wounded. Total Italian casualties from 1935 to 1940 according to these calculations were about 208,000 killed or wounded. Based on 1,911 Italians killed in the first six months of 1940, Ministry of Africa figures for 6 May 1936 to 10 June 1940 are 8,284 men killed, which Sbacchi considered to be fairly accurate. There was a lack of reliable statistics because confusion during the invasion made it difficult to keep accurate records and the Statistical Bulletin had ceased to provide data on fatalities. Field hospital records had been destroyed, inventories dispersed, individual deaths were not reported and bodies were not repatriated to Italy. Unpublished reports listed 3,694 military and civilian fatalities among 44,000 casualties and from May 1936 to June 1940, there were another 12,248 military and civilian fatalities in 144,000 casualties.

The Italian estimation of Ethiopian losses are 50,000 men killed in the Northern front and 20,000 men killed in the Southern front for a total of 70,000 battle deaths. Conversely, in a memorandum submitted to the Paris conference in 1946, the Ethiopian government enumerated 275,000 men killed in action, 78,500 Patriots killed in hostilities during the occupation from 1936 to 1941, 17,800 women and children killed by bombing, 30,000 people killed in the massacre of February 1937, 35,000 people died in concentration camps, 24,000 Patriots killed in obedience to orders from summary courts, 300,000 people died after their villages had been destroyed, a total of 760,300 deaths. However, Del Boca claims that these figures are unreliable and were likely exaggerated to extract more reparations. He asserts that the Italian estimation is more accurate. The Italian historian Enzo Traverso regards the fascist colonial conquest of Ethiopia as a genocidal war with the long-term aim of the disappearance of the Ethiopian population. The war was justified through the theories of Social Darwinism that saw European populations as genetically superior to African ones. He estimates that the war caused approximately 250,000 deaths among the indigenous population.

== War crimes ==
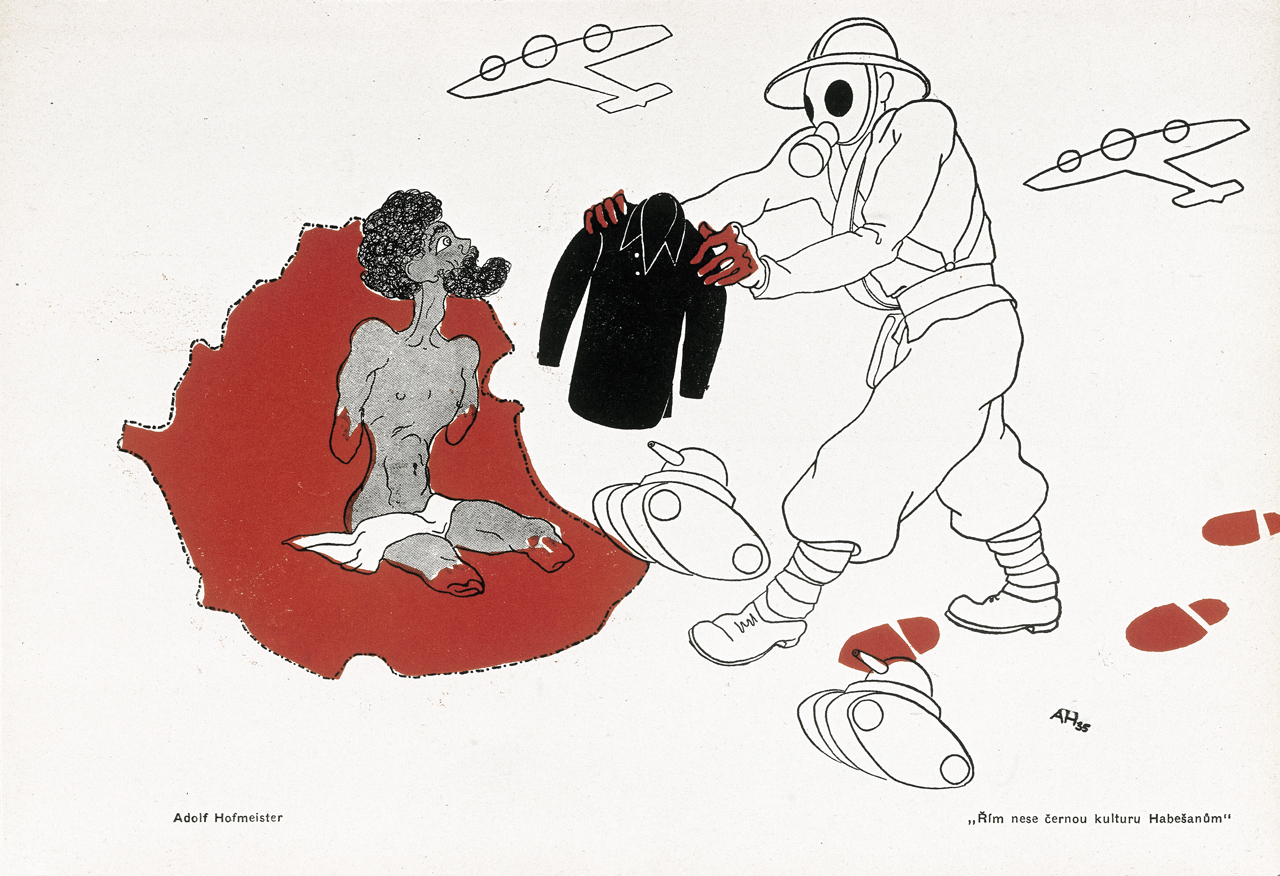
Rome brings black culture to the Abbysians, caricature by Adolf Hoffmeister, 1936

=== Use of chemical weapons ===
Italian military forces used between 300 and 500 tons of mustard gas to attack both military and civilian targets, despite being a signatory to the 1925 Geneva Protocol banning the practice. This gas had been produced during World War I and subsequently transported to East Africa. J. F. C. Fuller, who was present in Ethiopia during the conflict, stated that mustard gas "was the decisive tactical factor in the war." Historian Walter Laqueur estimates that up to one-third of Ethiopian casualties of the war were caused by chemical weapons.

The Italians claimed that their use of gas was justified by the execution of Tito Minniti and his observer in Ogaden by Ethiopian forces. However, the use of gas was authorized by Mussolini nearly two months before Minniti's death on 26 December 1935, as evidenced by the following order:

Rome, October 27, 1935. To His Excellency Graziani. The use of gas as an ultima ratio to overwhelm enemy resistance and in case of counter-attack is authorized. Mussolini.

After Minniti's death, the order was expanded to use of gas "on a vast scale":

Rome, December 28, 1935. To His Excellency Badoglio. Given the enemy system I have authorized Your Excellency the use even on a vast scale of any gas and flamethrowers. Mussolini.

Military and civilian targets were gas bombed and on 30 December, a Red Cross unit was bombed at Dolo and an Egyptian ambulance was attacked at Bulale; a few days later an Egyptian medical unit was bombed at Daggah Bur. There were more attacks in January and February, then on 4 March 1936, a British Red Cross camp near Quoram appeared to be subject to the most deliberate attack of all, when low-flying Italian aircraft crews could not have missed the big Red Cross signs.

The Italians delivered poison gas by gas shell and in bombs dropped by the Regia Aeronautica. Though poorly equipped, the Ethiopians had achieved some success against modern weaponry but had no defence against the "terrible rain that burned and killed".

In general, historians concluded that the use of chemical weapons was effective and devastating to morale and manpower, though some disagree and argue that they had negligible effect in battle. Historian Angelo Del Boca condemned the use of gas, but argued that it had only a minimal effect on Italian war aims. An analysis by the Stockholm International Peace Research Institute argued that the use of chemical weapons shifted the war in favor of the Italians, and dealt a major blow to Ethiopian morale.

American and British military analysis came to similar conclusions. The US military concluded that "Chemical weapons were devastating against the unprepared and unprotected Ethiopians." British Major General J. F. C. Fuller, assigned to the Italian army, noted that "In place of the laborious process of picketing the heights, the heights sprayed with gas were rendered unoccupiable by the enemy, save at the gravest risk. It was an exceedingly cunning use of this chemical."

Haile Selassie in his report to the League of Nations described it:

....Special sprayers were installed on board aircraft so they could vaporize over vast areas of territory a fine, death-dealing rain. Groups of 9, 15, or 18 aircraft followed one another so that the fog issuing from them formed a continuous sheet. It was thus that, as from the end of January 1936, soldiers, women, children, cattle, rivers, lakes, and pastures were drenched continually with this deadly rain. In order more surely to poison the waters and pastures, the Italian command made its aircraft pass over and over again. These fearful tactics succeeded. Men and animals succumbed. The deadly rain that fell from the aircraft made all those whom it touched fly shrieking with pain. All those who drank poisoned water or ate infected food also succumbed in dreadful suffering. In tens of thousands the victims of Italian mustard gas fell.

=== Dum-dum rounds and atrocities against prisoners of war ===
Ethiopian troops used dum-dum bullets, which had been banned by declaration IV, 3 of the Hague Convention (1899) and began mutilating captured Eritrean Askari (often with castration) beginning in the first weeks of war. Some hundreds of colonial Eritrean Ascari and dozens of Italians suffered these amputations, often done before death as allegedly happened to 17 Italian workers emasculated in Gondrand in February 1936.

During the first months of the invasion, Italian forces adopted an unofficial policy of "take no prisoners" and frequently executed surrendering enemy combatants, including their commanders. In May 1936, Mussolini issued an order to Graziani stating that "all rebels taken prisoner must be shot," which he followed up weeks later with further instructions to commit mass murder of "rebels" by saying "I repeat my authorization to Your Excellency to initiate and systematically conduct a policy of terror and extermination."

=== Attempts at Prosecution ===
Ethiopian leaders, such as Emperor Haile Selassie and Abebe Aregai, played key roles in ensuring there were few extra-judicial reprisals. The Emperor repeatedly spoke against reprisals for Italian crimes. On 20 January 1941, he made a call not to retaliate and, in his 5 May 1941 proclamation of victory he paid homage to those who were "pitilessly massacred" but urged Ethiopians not to "indulge in the atrocities which the enemy has been practicing." The Emperor reprimanded Ras Kassa, a prominent nobleman, when he killed a few Italians and ex-Askaris in reprisal for his three sons' earlier execution for resistance activities. In Addis Ababa, Abebe Aregai posted guards in every Italian quarter and in front of prominent Italian civil and military figures' homes to protect their property and safety. By the end of 1942, according to the International Red Cross, there had been only 56 homicides against Italians - out of a total Italian population of 30,000 in Addis Ababa.

Following Italy's surrender in 1943, Ethiopian individuals and organisations increasingly called for prosecutions for war crimes committed furing the war and subsequent occupation. Some, such as the Ethiopian Legation in London, lobbied British authorities for accountability, including the extradition of Mussolini, Badoglio, and Ras Gugsa (son-in-law of the Emperor, accused of collaborating with the Italian administration). Such calls also gained traction in public debate with Sylvia Pankhurst publishing a pamphlet titled "Italy's War Crimes in Ethiopia" featuring photographs of tortured and decapitated Ethiopian victims. Similarly, the Ethiopian Ministry of Information published the sarcastically titled "La Civilisation de L'italie Fasciste en Ethiopie (The Fascist Italian Civilisation in Ethiopia)" which, in two volumes, documented Badoglio and Graziani's culpability and pictures of atrocities.

==== Ethiopian War Crimes Commission, 1946 ====
On 20 May 1946, an Ethiopian War Crimes Commission was appointed to investigate and prosecute Italian war crimes committed during the Second Italo-Ethiopian War. The Ethiopian War Crimes Commission under Ambaye Wolde Mariam began obtaining evidence to justify the trial of Marshal Badoglio and Marshal Graziani among other high ranking Italian officials.

Ethiopia’s efforts to submit cases to the United Nations War Crimes Commission (UNWCC) raised the question of whether the Italo-Ethiopian conflict fell within its jurisdiction, as both Italian and British perspectives held that the war had effectively ended with Italy’s annexation by 1936—or at the latest before 1939—thereby framing any subsequent Italian violence as part of colonial administration rather than wartime conduct subject to UNWCC scrutiny. Ethiopia’s Swedish legal adviser, Baron Erik Leijonhufvud, proposed a compromise in which an Ethiopian tribunal would include a majority of foreign judges and follow procedures and legal standards similar to those of the Nuremberg International Military Tribunal.

Unlike in the Nuremberg Trials in post-Nazi Germany, few Italians were tried for war crimes after 1945. Critically, whatever the position taken by the UNWCC on individual cases, prosecution would require extradition of suspects, and Allied pressure on Italy to achieve this. Thus the Ethiopian War Crimes Commission limited itself to the prosecution of two persons, Badoglio and Graziani. However, Badoglio was never formally tried for war crimes, as the British government, in particular, saw Badoglio as a valuable asset for maintaining order in Italy. Graziani was tried for Nazi collaborationism at the Supreme Court in 1948, but his colonial conduct was left unquestioned.

Ethiopian veterans are seeking an apology and compensation from Italy for war crimes committed during the Second Italo-Ethiopian War, particularly the use of chemical weapons like mustard gas. While there is no record of a formal, official apology, Italy did acknowledge the use of chemical weapons in a 1996 statement.

== Public and international reaction ==
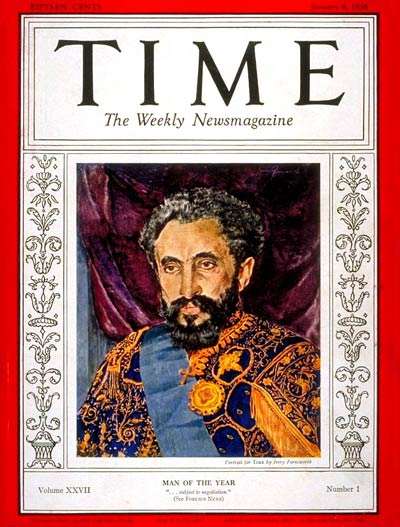
Haile Selassie's resistance to the Italian invasion made him Time Person of the Year 1935.

Italy's military victory overshadowed concerns about the economy. Mussolini was at the height of his popularity in May 1936 with the proclamation of the Italian empire. His biographer, Renzo De Felice, called the war "Mussolini's masterpiece" as for a brief moment he had been able to create something resembling a national consensus both in favor of himself and his regime. When Badoglio returned to Italy, he received a snub, as Mussolini made certain that the honours bestowed on Badoglio received fell short of those granted to an Italian "national hero", in order to present the victory as an achievement of the Fascist system rather than as an achievement of the traditional Italian elites, of which Badoglio was a member. A sign of Mussolini's increased power and popularity after the war was his creation of a new military rank; First Marshal of the Italian Empire, to which he promoted both himself and King Victor Emmanuel III, thus putting the prime minister on a theoretical level of equality with the king.

Haile Selassie sailed from Djibouti in the British cruiser HMS Enterprise. From Mandatory Palestine Selassie sailed to Gibraltar en route to Britain. While still in Jerusalem, Haile Selassie sent a telegram to the League of Nations:

We have decided to bring to an end the most unequal, most unjust, most barbarous war of our age, and have chosen the road to exile in order that our people will not be exterminated and in order to consecrate ourselves wholly and in peace to the preservation of our empire's independence... we now demand that the League of Nations should continue its efforts to secure respect for the covenant, and that it should decide not to recognize territorial extensions, or the exercise of an assumed sovereignty, resulting from the illegal recourse to armed force and to numerous other violations of international agreements.

The Ethiopian Emperor's telegram caused several nations to temporarily defer recognition of the Italian conquest.

On 30 June, Selassie spoke at the League of Nations and was introduced by the President of the Assembly as "His Imperial Majesty, the Emperor of Ethiopia" ("Sa Majesté Imperiale, l'Empereur d'Ethiopie"). A group of jeering Italian journalists began yelling insults and were expelled before he could speak. In response, the Romanian chairman, Nicolae Titulescu, jumped to his feet and shouted "Show the savages the door!" ("À la porte les sauvages!"). Selassie denounced Italian aggression and criticised the world community for standing by. At the conclusion of his speech, which appeared on newsreels throughout the world, he said "It is us today. It will be you tomorrow".

France appeased Italy because it could not afford to risk an alliance between Italy and Germany; Britain decided that its military weakness meant that it had to follow France's lead. Selassie's resolution to the League to deny recognition of the Italian conquest was defeated and he was denied a loan to finance a resistance movement. On 4 July 1936, the League voted to end the sanctions imposed against Italy in November 1935. By 15 July, the sanctions were at an end. (Note: In 1976, Baer wrote that Selassie's resolution requesting loans was defeated by a vote of 23 against, 25 abstentions and 1 vote for (from Ethiopia). In the sanctions vote, 44 delegates approved the ending of sanctions, 4 abstained and 1 (Ethiopian) delegate voted for retention.) The end of the sanctions implicitly sanctioned the recognition of the new Italian possessions by the other nations and the event was "greeted in Italy with an enthusiasm that often reached the heights of exaltation".

On 18 November 1936, the Italian Empire was recognised by the Empire of Japan and Italy recognised the Japanese occupation of Manchuria, marking the end of the Stresa Front. Hitler had supplied the Ethiopians with 16,000 rifles and 600 machine guns in the hope that Italy would be weakened when he moved against Austria. By contrast, France and Britain recognised Italian control over Ethiopia in 1938. Mexico was the only country to strongly condemn Italy's sovereignty over Ethiopia, respecting Ethiopian independence throughout. Including Mexico, only six nations in 1937 did not recognise the Italian occupation: China, New Zealand, the Soviet Union, Republican Spain and the United States. Three years later, only the USSR officially recognised Selassie and the United States government considered recognising the Italian Empire with Ethiopia included.

The conflict has been described by historian Brenda Gayle Plummer as triggering the first "great manifestation" of African American interest in foreign affairs, despite the financial limitations imposed by the Great Depression and the US government's interwar commitment to neutrality. Large-scale organised responses to Italy's attack on Ethiopia included a peaceful demonstration in New York City on 18 August 1935 and Chicago on 1 September. Historian Jacquelyn Dowd Hall situates these developments in her chronology of a "long civil rights movement" in which she traces the emergence of a black popular front in the 1930s.

Another place where there was significant public support for Ethiopia was the Empire of Japan, which had served as a model to some Ethiopian intellectuals. After the Walwal incident, several right-wing Japanese groups, including the Great Asianism Association and the Black Dragon Society, attempted to raise money for the Ethiopian cause. The Japanese ambassador to Italy, Dr. Sugimura Yotaro, on 16 July assured Mussolini that Japan held no political interests in Ethiopia and would stay neutral in the coming war. His comments stirred up a furor inside Japan, where there had been popular affinity for the fellow nonwhite empire in Africa, which was reciprocated with similar anger in Italy towards Japan combined with praise for Mussolini and his firm stance against the "gialli di Tokyo" ("Tokyo Yellows"). Despite popular opinion, when the Ethiopians approached Japan for help on 2 August, they were refused, and even a modest request for the Japanese government for an official statement of its support for Ethiopia during the coming conflict was denied.

It was particularly within the colonial world that considerable support for Ethiopia was found. There were demonstrations in support of Ethiopia all over the world, from Damascus to New Delhi. Jawaharlal Nehru made a stirring call for solidarity with Ethiopia, noting that "We in India can do nothing to help our brethren in distress in Ethiopia for we are also victims of imperialism but we stand with them today in their sorrow as we hope to stand together when better days come". In South Africa, General Jan Smuts, the Union's interim Prime Minister, stated that the conflict could have continental consequences because "every African subject has already given their sympathy to Ethiopia". Former Ghanaian leader Kwame Nkrumah, then a student in London, writes in his autobiography that when he saw the headline "Mussolini invades Abyssinia" he was immediately overcome with intense emotion.

At that moment, it was as if all of London had declared war on me. For a few minutes, I could do nothing but observe the impassive faces of passersby, wondering inwardly if these people were aware of their morbid colonialism, and praying that the day would come when I could play my part in the downfall of this system. My nationalism was rising to the surface; I was ready to go through hell, if necessary, to achieve this goal.

— Kwame Nkrumah

== See also ==
- List of Second Italo-Ethiopian War weapons of Ethiopia
- Ethiopian Air Force
- List of Second Italo-Ethiopian War weapons of Italy
- Censorship in Italy
- Faccetta Nera
- First Italo-Ethiopian War
- Paris Peace Treaties, 1947
- Timeline of the Second Italo-Ethiopian War
- Vogra Massacre

== Sources ==
=== Books ===
- Abbink, Gerrit Jan; De Bruijn, Mirjam; Van Walraven, Klass, eds. (2003). Rethinking Resistance: Revolt and Violence in African History. African Dynamics. Vol. II (illus. ed.). Leiden, NL: Brill. ISBN 978-90-04-12624-4.
- Akyeampong, Emmanuel Kwaku; Gates, Henry Louis, eds. (2012). Dictionary of African Biography. Vol. II. Oxford University Press USA. ISBN 9780195382075.
- Antonicelli, Franco (1975). Trent'anni di storia italiana: dall'antifascismo alla Resistenza (1915–1945) lezioni con testimonianze [Thirty Years of Italian History: From Antifascism to the Resistance (1915–1945) Lessons with Testimonials]. Reprints Einaudi (in Italian). Torino: Giulio Einaudi Editore. OCLC 878595757.
- Baer, George W. (1976). Test Case: Italy, Ethiopia, and the League of Nations. Stanford, California: Hoover Institute Press, Stanford University. ISBN 978-0-8179-6591-4.
- Barker, A. J. (1968). The Civilising Mission: The Italo-Ethiopian War 1935–6. London: Cassell. ISBN 978-0-304-93201-6.
- Barker, A. J. (1971). Rape of Ethiopia, 1936. New York: Ballantine Books. ISBN 978-0-345-02462-6.
- Baudendistel, Reiner (2006). Between Bombs and Good Intentions: The Red Cross and the Italo-Ethiopian War, 1935–1936. Human Rights in Context. Vol. I. Oxford: Berghahn. ISBN 978-1-84545-035-9.
- Candeloro, Giorgio (1981). Storia dell'Italia Moderna [History of Modern Italy] (in Italian) (10th ed.). Milano: Feltrinelli. OCLC 797807582.
- Cannistraro, Philip V. (1982). Historical Dictionary of Fascist Italy. Westport, Connecticut: Greenwood Press. ISBN 978-0-313-21317-5.
- Clarence-Smith, W. G. (1989). The Economics of the Indian Ocean Slave Trade in the Nineteenth Century. London: Frank Cass. ISBN 978-0-7146-3359-6.
- Clark, D. K. (1959). Effectiveness of Toxic Chemicals in the Italo–Ethiopian War. Bethesda, Maryland: Operations Research Office.
- Crozier, Andrew J. (2004). The Causes of the Second World War. Oxford: Blackwell. ISBN 978-0-631-18601-4.
- Del Boca, Angelo; Rochat, Giorgio (1996). I gas di Mussolini: il fascismo e la guerra d'Etiopia [Mussolini's Gas: Fascism and the Ethiopian War]. Primo piano (in Italian). Roma: Editori Riuniti. ISBN 978-88-359-4091-3.
- Del Boca, Angelo (2005). Italiani, brava gente? Un mito duro a morire [Italians, Good People? A Myth dies Hard]. I colibrì (in Italian). Vicenza: N. Pozza. ISBN 978-88-545-0013-6.
- Del Boca, Angelo (2009). Gli italiani in Africa Orientale – II. La conquista dell'Impero (in Italian). Milan: Mondadori. ISBN 978-88-04-46947-6.
- Dominioni, M. (2008). Lo sfascio dell'impero: gli italiani in Etiopia [The Collapse of the Empire: The Italians in Ethiopia]. Quadrante Laterza, 143 (in Italian). Roma: Laterza. ISBN 978-8-84-208533-1.
- Gooch, John (2007). Mussolini and His Generals. Cambridge: Cambridge University Press. ISBN 978-0-521-85602-7.
- Kallis, Aristotle (2000). Fascist Ideology Territory and Expansionism in Italy and Germany, 1922–1945. London: Routledge. ISBN 978-0-415-21612-8.
- Lamb, Richard (1999). Mussolini as Diplomat. New York: Fromm International. ISBN 978-0-88064-244-6.
- Leckie, Robert (1987). Delivered from Evil: The Saga of World War II. New York: Harper & Row. ISBN 978-0-06-015812-5.
- Lowe, Cedric James; Marzari, F. (2010) [1975]. Italian Foreign Policy 1870–1940. Foreign Policies of the Great Powers. Vol. VIII (online ed.). London: Routledge. ISBN 978-1-315-88880-4.
- Mack Smith, D. (1982). Mussolini: A Biography. New York: Alfred A. Knopf. ISBN 978-0-394-50694-4.
- Mack Smith, D. (1983) [1981]. Mussolini. London: Weidenfeld and Nicolson. ISBN 978-0-586-08444-1.
- Mallet, Robert (2015) [2015]. Mussolini in Ethiopia, 1919–1935. Cambridge: Cambridge University Press. ISBN 978-1107090439.
- Marcus, Harold, ed. (1999). Haile Selassie I: My Life and Ethiopia's Progress: The Autobiography of Emperor Haile Selassie I, King of Kings and Lord of Lords. Vol. II. Translated by Gebions, Ezekiel. Chicago: Research Associates School Times Publications. ISBN 978-0-948390-40-1.
- Mignemi, A., ed. (1982). Si e no padroni del mondo. Etiopia 1935–36. Immagine e consenso per un impero [Yes and no: Masters of the World. Ethiopia 1935–36. Image and Consensus for an Empire] (in Italian). Novara: Istituto Storico della Resistenza in Provincia Novara Piero Fornara. OCLC 878601977.
- Mockler, Anthony (2003). Haile Selassie's War. New York: Olive Branch Press. ISBN 978-1-56656-473-1.
- Nicolle, David (1997). The Italian Invasion of Abyssinia 1935–1936. Westminster, Maryland: Osprey. ISBN 978-1-85532-692-7.
- Othen, Christopher (2017). Lost Lions of Judah: Haile Selassie's Mongrel Foreign Legion. Amberley. ISBN 978-1-4456-5983-1.
- Palla, Marco (2000). Mussolini and Fascism. Interlink Illustrated Histories. New York: Interlink Books. ISBN 978-1-56656-340-6.
- Pankhurst, R. (1968). A Brief Note on the Economic History of Ethiopia from 1800 to 1935. Addis Ababa: Haile Selassie I University. OCLC 434191.
- Peace and War: United States Foreign Policy 1931–1941. Washington, DC: United States Department of State. 1983 [1943]. OCLC 506009610. Archived from the original on 4 March 2017 – via Hyperwar Foundation.
- Rochat, Giorgio (2008). Le guerre italiane 1935–1943 (in Italian). Milano: Einaudi. ISBN 978-88-06-19168-9.
- Rhodes, A. (1973). The Vatican in the Age of the Dictators: 1922–1945. London: Hodder & Stoughton. ISBN 978-0-340-02394-5.
- Safire, William (1997). Lend Me Your Ears: Great Speeches in History (rev. expanded ed.). New York: norton. ISBN 978-0-393-04005-0.
- Sbacchi, A. (1997). Legacy of Bitterness: Ethiopia and Fascist Italy, 1935–1941. Lawrenceville, New Jersey: Red Sea Press. ISBN 978-0-932415-74-5.
- Shinn, D. H.; Ofcansky, T. P. (2013). Historical Dictionary of Ethiopia. Historical dictionaries of Africa (2nd ed.). Lanham: Scarecrow Press. ISBN 978-0-8108-7194-6.
- Smart, J. K. (1997). "History of Chemical and Biological Warfare: An American Perspective" ( (PDF)). In Zajtchuk, Russ (ed.). Medical Aspects of Chemical and Biological Warfare. Textbook of Military Medicine: Warfare, Weaponry and the Casualty: Part I. Vol. III (online ed.). Bethesda, Maryland: Office of The Surgeon General Department of the Army, United States of America. OCLC 40153101. Archived from the original on 3 February 2021.
- Spencer, John H. (2006). Ethiopia at Bay: A Personal Account of the Haile Selassie Years. Hollywood, California: Tsehai Publishers. ISBN 978-1-59907-000-1.
- Stackelberg, R. (2009). Hitler's Germany: Origins, Interpretations, Legacies (2nd ed.). London: Routledge. ISBN 978-0-415-37331-9.
- Stapleton, Timothy J. (2013). A Military History of Africa: The Colonial Period: from the Scramble for Africa to the Algerian Independence War (ca. 1870–1963). Vol. II. Santa Barbara, California: ABC-CLIO. ISBN 978-0-313-39570-3.
- Stapleton, Timothy (2018). Africa: War and Conflict in the Twentieth Century. Abingdon-on-Thames: Routledge. ISBN 9781351104661.
- Stearns, Peter N.; Langer, William Leonard (2002). The Encyclopedia of World History: Ancient, Medieval and Modern (6th, online ed.). New York: Bartleby.com. OCLC 51671800.
- Sullivan, Barry (1999). "More than Meets the Eye: The Ethiopian War and the Origins of the Second World War". In Martel, G. (ed.). The Origins of the Second World War Reconsidered A. J. P. Taylor and the Historians (2nd ed.). Routledge. pp. 178–203. ISBN 978-0-415-16325-5.

=== Journals ===
- Cernuschi, Enrico (December 1994). "La resistenza sconosciuta in Africa Orientale" [The Unknown Resistance in East Africa]. Rivista Storica (in Italian). OCLC 30747124.
- Calvitt Clarke, J. (1999). "Japan and Italy squabble over Ethiopia: The Sugimura affair of July 1935". Selected Annual Proceedings of the Florida Conference of Historians: 9–20. ISSN 2373-9517. Archived from the original on 8 June 2010.
- Holt, Andrew (2011). "No more Hoares to Paris': British Foreign Policymaking and the Abyssinian Crisis, 1935" (PDF). Review of International Studies. XXXVII (3): 1383–1401. doi:10.1017/S0260210510001646. ISSN 0260-2105. Archived (PDF) from the original on 11 November 2023.
- Labanca, Nicola (2004). "Colonial rule, colonial repression and war crimes in the Italian colonies". Journal of Modern Italian Studies. 9 (3): 300–313. doi:10.1080/1354571042000254737. S2CID 144498755.
- Sbacchi, Alberto (1978). Marcus, H. G. (ed.). "The Price of Empire: Towards an Enumeration of Italian Casualties in Ethiopia 1935–40". Ethiopianist Notes. II (2). ISSN 1063-2751.
- Salerno, Reynolds M. (1997). "The French Navy and the Appeasement of Italy, 1937–9". The English Historical Review. CXII (445): 66–104. doi:10.1093/ehr/cxii.445.66. ISSN 0013-8266.
