= Battle of Shire (1936) =

1936 battle of the Second Italo-Abyssinian War

- Part of the Second Italo-Abyssinian War
Date	29 February – 2 March 1936
Location	Shire, Ethiopia
Result	Italian victory

Belligerents
Italy	Ethiopia

Commanders and leaders
(Kingdom of Italy) Pietro Badoglio	(Ethiopian Empire) Ras Imru

Strength
47,000	23,500

Casualties and losses
1,000 killed & wounded	4,000 killed & wounded

The Battle of Shire (Italian: Battaglia dello Shirè) was fought on the northern front of what was known as the Second Italo-Abyssinian War. This battle consisted of attacks and counterattacks by Italian forces under Marshal of Italy Pietro Badoglio and Ethiopian forces under Ras (Note: Roughly equivalent to Duke.) Imru Haile Selassie. This battle was primarily fought in the Shire area of Ethiopia.

== Background ==
In early January 1936, the Ethiopian forces were in the hills everywhere overlooking the Italian positions and launching attacks against them on a regular basis. Italian dictator Benito Mussolini was impatient for an Italian offensive to get under way and for the Ethiopians to be swept from the field. In response to his frequent exhortations, Badoglio cabled Mussolini: "It has always been my rule to be meticulous in preparation so that I may be swift in action." By mid-January 1936, Badoglio was ready to renew the advance on the Ethiopian capital. Badoglio overwhelmed the armies of ill-armed and uncoordinated Ethiopian warriors with mustard gas, tanks, and heavy artillery.

The Ethiopians facing the Italians were in three groupings. In the center, near Abiy Addi and along the Beles River in the Tembien, were Ras Kassa Haile Darge with approximately 40,000 men and Ras Seyum Mangasha with about 30,000 men. On the Ethiopian right was Ras Mulugeta Yeggazu and his army of approximately 80,000 men in positions atop Amba Aradam. Ras Imru Haile Selassie with approximately 40,000 men was on the Ethiopian left in the area around Seleh Leha and Shire.

Badoglio had five army corps at his disposal. On his right, he had the Italian IV Corps and the Italian II Corps facing Ras Imru in the Shire region. In the Italian center was the Eritrean Corps facing Ras Kassa and Ras Seyoum in the Tembien. Facing Ras Mulugeta atop Amba Aradam was the Italian I Corps and the Italian III Corps.

Initially, Badoglio saw the destruction of Ras Mulugeta's army as his first priority. Ras Mulugeta's force would have to be dislodged from its strong positions on Amba Aradam in order for the Italians to continue the advance towards Addis Ababa. But Ras Kassa and Ras Seyoum were exerting such pressure from the Tembien that Badoglio decided that he would have to deal with them first. If the Ethiopian center was successful, the I Corps and III Corps facing Ras Mulugeta would be cut off from reinforcement and resupply.

== Battle ==
Ras Imru had little knowledge of the battles taking place to his west. Messages routed through Gondar took an average of eleven days to reach him. On 29 February, Badoglio launched the Battle of Shire using the Italian II Corps and the Italian IV Corps.

However, Imru, although unaware of the catastrophic situation on the northern front, was equipped with an excellent local intelligence service which allowed him to know the position of the troops of General Maravigna's II Army Corps in Axum. He had been made aware of the fact that on 20 February General Ezio Babbini's IV Army Corps had begun to move from its defensive position in Eritrea in the direction of Mareb and therefore towards the desert region of Adi Abò, with the clear intention of converging on Selekleka. Thus Ras Imru became aware of Badoglio's plan of carrying out a pincer maneuver and decided to withdraw beyond the Tekeze. Unaware that his plans had been discovered, on February 29 Badoglio deployed the II and IV Italian Army Corps.

=== The Italian pursuit ===
The Italian II Corps under General Maravigna advanced from Axum to within about twenty kilometers of the village where Ras Imru had established his headquarters. At the same time, the IV Corps under General Ezio Babbini moved according to plan to attack the left flank of the Ethiopian forces. However, the terrain between Adi Abò and the advancing Italian armies was harsh and difficult to cross. As a result, the IV Corps advanced much more slowly than expected, preventing the pincer movement planned by Badoglio from closing successfully. General Ezio Babbini's troops reached Selekleka only on 6 March, too late even to join the pursuit of the retreating Ethiopian army.

While the IV Corps was still far behind, the II Corps continued toward Selekleka. At the Acab Saat–Selekleka crossroads, the 3rd CC.NN. Division "21 Aprile" turned right and occupied the heights of Acab Saat without resistance, while the "Gavinana" Division advanced toward Selekleka. As soon as the descent began, however, the Italian vanguard came under heavy fire from Ethiopian troops lying in ambush. During the fighting, Prince Adalberto, Duke of Bergamo, commander of the "Gran Sasso" Division, attempted to personally charge the Ethiopians with a grenade in his hand, and had to be physically restrained by his own men.

General Maravigna ordered his forces to take up defensive positions and deployed all available artillery, which was often forced to fire at point-blank range. After intense fighting, and with support from Royal Air Force bombing units, the Ethiopian forces were destroyed. However, Maravigna's defensive deployment prevented the Italians from resuming their advance the next day. This angered Badoglio, who accused him of exaggerating the size of the Ethiopian force.

On 2 March, the II Corps resumed its advance, but it was briefly halted by Ras Imru’s rearguard. The attack was short-lived, and by the following morning, when Italian artillery and aircraft were prepared to strike, the Ethiopians had already withdrawn. At that point, the battle was effectively over, with the Ethiopian forces retreating from their positions. In reality, Ras Imru had conducted an orderly withdrawal toward the Tekeze river fords after leaving strong rearguard units to delay the Italian advance. In doing so, he successfully escaped the encirclement planned by Badoglio.

=== Trapped at the Tekezé ===
Realizing he was facing only the Ethiopian rearguard and Ras Imru's main army was making an orderly withdrawal across the Tekezé, Badoglio decided to deploy the air force to annihilate the Abyssinian troops. On 3 March and 4 March, 126 Italian fighters and bombers dropped 636 quintals of explosives, incendiary bombs and mustard gas, as well as 25,000 machine gun bullets on Ras Imru's army as it crossed the Tekezé River. Beyond the river, the Ethiopians faced a rain of deadly mustard gas and strafing by low flying fighters. When the II Corps crossed the Takezé days later, the effectiveness of the Italian air arm was made apparent by the thousands of putrefying corpses.

== Aftermath ==
The destruction of the army of Ras Imru, following the destruction of the armies of Ras Mulugeta and Ras Kassa, allowed Bodoglio to again focus his attention on his advance on Addis Ababa. The whole of the northern region was open and virtually unprotected. With the exception of the army under the personal command of Haile Selassie, there was nothing between Badoglio and the Ethiopian capital. Of Haile Selassie's options, Badoglio explained: "The Emperor has three choices. To attack, and be defeated; to wait for our attack, and we will win anyway; or to retreat, which is disastrous for an army that lacks means of transport and proper organization for food and munitions."

Badoglio meticulously prepared for his next advance. A network of new roads was constructed. Supplies were dumped into the forward area. Two lines of forts were constructed and manned to protect the main lines of communication. Bands of Azebo Oromo were armed, paid, and organized to patrol the conquered areas. This allowed Badoglio's main force to redeploy to the front in readiness for the coming offensive.

Ras Imru escaped the destructive attacks by the Regia Aeronautica with approximately 10,000 men only to have most of them slip away when the opportunity presented itself. By the time Imru reached Debre Marqos, he was accompanied only by the 300 men of his personal bodyguard. His progress to re-join the Emperor was slowed by constant harassment by the Italians. The Battle of Maychew was over before he again saw Haile Selassie.

In addition to preparing for his next advance, Badoglio sent out a number of independent motorized columns to occupy Gondar, Deborah, Sokota, and Sardo. These operations were carried out systematically and, as there was little opposition, they were quickly concluded. On 1 April, a column led by Fascist Achille Starace captured Gondar, the capital of Begemder Province. This mobile infantry column was between 3,000 and 5,000 strong and composed of Blackshirts. It moved in an assortment of several hundred trucks and was called Starace's East African Fast Column (Colonna Celere dell'Africa Orientale). Starace, known as "the Panther Man" (L'uomo pantera), was a Major General in the National Security Volunteer Militia (Milizia Volontaria per la Sicurezza Nazionale, or MSVN) and Party Secretary of the National Fascist Party (Partito Nazionale Fascista, or PNF). By 3 April, Starace and his men reached the shores of Lake Tana. The border region with British Sudan was secured and the Panther Man's column had covered approximately 75 miles in three days. There were rumors that Ras Imru had 40,000 men at Ifag and Ras Kassa had 8,000 men at Debre Tabor. With British help, these forces were organizing to retake Gondar.

On 24 April, two battalions from Starace's column, the "Mussolini" Blackshirt Battalion and the 111th Native Battalion, made a surprise attack on Debre Tabor. The battalions met with no resistance. While Ras Kassa and Dejazmach (Note: Roughly equivalent to Commander of the Gate.) Ayalew Birru had been reported to be in Debre Tabor, Ras Kassa was in actuality many miles away and Dejazmach Ayalew Birru had left as the Italians approached.

== See also ==
- Ethiopian Order of Battle Second Italo-Abyssinian War
- Army of the Ethiopian Empire
- List of Second Italo-Ethiopian War weapons of Ethiopia
- Italian Order of Battle Second Italo-Abyssinian War
- Royal Italian Army
- List of Italian military equipment in the Second Italo-Ethiopian War

== Notes ==
Footnotes

Citations
