= Battle of Amba Aradam =

1936 Second Italo-Abyssinian War battle

Coordinates: 13.3311°N 39.5111°E

- Part of the Second Italo-Abyssinian War
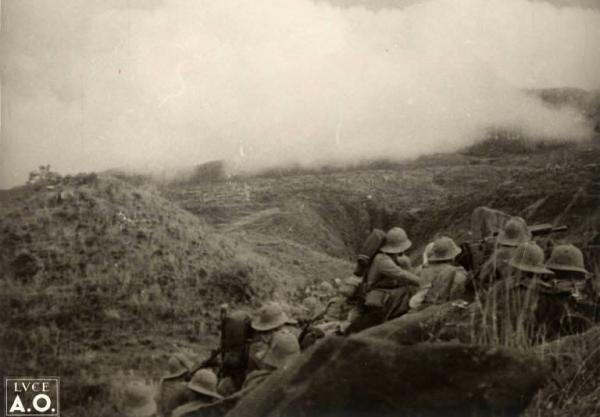
- Italian soldiers during the battle
Date	10–19 February 1936
Location	Plain of Kalamino, Plain of Hintalo, and Amba Aradam, Ethiopia
Result	Italian victory

Belligerents
Italy: Italian Eritrea	Ethiopia

Commanders and leaders
(Kingdom of Italy) Pietro Badoglio	(Ethiopian Empire) Ras Mulugeta † (Ethiopian Empire) Tadessa Mulugeta †

Strength
70,000; 280 field guns 5,000 machine guns 170 airplanes	80,000; 18 field guns 400 machine guns

Casualties and losses
800 casualties	18,000 killed and wounded

The Battle of Amba Aradam (also known as the Battle of Enderta) was fought on the northern front of what was known as the Second Italo-Abyssinian War. This battle consisted of attacks and counter-attacks by Italian forces under Marshal of Italy Pietro Badoglio and Ethiopian forces under Ras (Note: Roughly equivalent to duke.) Mulugeta Yeggazu. This battle was primarily fought in the area around Amba Aradam which included most of Enderta Province.

== Background ==
In early January 1936, the Ethiopian forces were in the hills overlooking the Italian positions and attacking them regularly. Italian dictator Benito Mussolini was impatient for an Italian offensive to get underway.

The Ethiopians facing the Italians were in three groupings. In the centre, near Abbi Addi and along the Beles River in the Tembien, were Ras Kassa Haile Darge with approximately 40,000 men and Ras Seyoum Mangasha with about 30,000 men. On the Ethiopian right was Ras Mulugeta and his army of approximately 80,000 men in positions atop Amba Aradam. Ras Imru Haile Selassie with approximately 40,000 men was on the Ethiopian left in the area around Seleh Leha in Shire Province.

Badoglio had five army corps at his disposal. On his right, he had the IV Army Corps and the II Army Corps facing Ras Imru in the Shire. In the Italian centre was the Eritrean Corps facing Ras Kassa and Ras Seyoum in the Tembien. Facing Ras Mulugeta atop Amba Aradam was the I Army Corps and the III Army Corps.

Initially, Badoglio saw the destruction of Ras Mulugeta's army as his first priority. Mulugeta's force would have to be dislodged from its strong positions on Amba Aradam in order for the Italians to continue the advance towards Addis Ababa. But Ras Kassa and Ras Seyoum were exerting such pressure from the Tembien that Badoglio decided that he would have to deal with them first. If the Ethiopian centre was successful, the I Army Corps and III Army Corps facing Mulugeta would be cut off from reinforcement and resupply.

From 20 to 24 January, the First Battle of Tembien was fought. The outcome of this battle was inconclusive, but the threat Ras Kassa posed to the I Army Corps and III Army Corps was neutralized.

On 9 February, Marshal Badoglio held a press conference at his headquarters and announced that the mighty obstacle that blocked the road to Addis Ababa was about to be liquidated. Badoglio was referring to Ras Mulugeta and his army dug in atop Amba Aradam. The mountain was of two parts. There was a jagged ridge known to the Italians as "The Herringbone" and, on the extreme right, a flat-topped peak called "The Priest's Hat". The land around the base of the mountain was known as the Enderta. An article in a then-current issue of Time magazine indicated that the correspondents on the Italian side were provided with a high-powered telescope to watch the progress of the battle.

While their forces were roughly equal in number, Badoglio held an overwhelming material advantage over Mulugeta. The Italians attacking Amba Aradam had more than 5,000 machine guns, 280 pieces of artillery, and 170 airplanes. By contrast, the Ethiopians had about 400 machine guns, 18 old field pieces of medium calibre, a small number of anti-aircraft guns, and no planes. Mulugeta's one advantage was the steep slopes of Amba Aradam.

== Battle ==
At 8:00 am on 10 February, General Ruggero Santini's I Corps and General Ettore Bastico 's III Corps began their encirclement of the Amba Aradam massif under a pouring thunderstorm. Ras Mulughieta's army did not appear until February 12, when on the left of the Italian line it severely engaged the Blackshirts of the "3 Gennaio" division under General Traditi, striking the Italians with violent melee attacks supported by machine guns and 47 mm guns in the Taga Taga area. On the right, the Ethiopians also attacked the III Corps with extreme force and determination, seriously engaging General Bertini's "Sila" division on the Dansà-Bet Quinàt slopes with the aim of pushing it back beyond the May Gabat. Throughout the day the Ethiopians contested with the men of the "Sila" the possession of the Dansà, the first step towards the Amba Aradam, but the Italian machine guns effectively repelled the repeated enemy assaults, so much so that at the end of the day Badoglio was able to declare that the Ethiopian attacks "although conducted with extreme determination, did not demonstrate the presence of a single concept, nor a profitable command action. Furthermore, they were carried out with relatively small forces, undoubtedly much inferior to those that Ras Mulughieta could have had at his disposal" . In fact, in addition to not being able to have access to technological means useful for communicating with the other commanders, Mulughieta, barricaded in a cave almost at the top of the Amba Aradam, was the victim of the exhausting hammering action that the Italian artillery carried out against the massif; During the whole battle the Italian guns fired 22,908 rounds into the area, including many 105 mm shells loaded with arsine, while the aircraft dropped 3,960 quintals of bombs, almost a third of all the explosives dropped during the conflict

Between February 13 and 14, the Italians firmly established themselves in their established positions and began preparing for the final assault, while the Abyssinian forces were almost unable to mount any offensive counteraction. The lack of adequate means for modern warfare was felt among the Ethiopian ranks: "They fight with black-powder rifles and a few machine guns; wretches," noted journalist Cesco Tonelli, who added: "Our entire offensive apparatus is now revealed; it's powerful. If it surprises us [...] imagine the Abyssinians, on whom all that metal is raining down." While Badoglio's forces were clearly superior, on the Ethiopian side the emperor was informed of the Italian offensive only on the 11th and, from his headquarters, was unable even to coordinate his four armies in the north; the only dispatch he managed to get to its destination was directed to Ras Kassa, in which he was ordered to move as quickly as possible and with all his forces to the right flank of the Italian deployment, so as to cut off the forces under the command of Bastico: but the order reached its destination only on the evening of 15 February when Mulughieta had already ordered the retreat.

By the morning of 15 February, under cover of darkness and dense cloud, the Italians completed the encirclement of Amba Aradam. When daylight came and the clouds lifted, the Ethiopians attacked down the western slopes of Amba Aradam towards Addi Kolo, but the Italian artillery and air power blunted the Ethiopian assault. By darkness, the battle was practically over. Ras Mulugeta guessed that the Italians would take Amba Aradam by first attacking "The Priest's Hat", but in fact The Italians attacked and secured the lightly held Ethiopian positions on "The Herringbone" which made defence of the "Priest's Hat" untenable. For political reasons, the 1st CC.NN. Division "23 Marzo" under Prince Filiberto was given the honour of hoisting the Italian flag atop Amba Aradam. The Ethiopians had managed to create a break in the Italian line around Addi Kolo. Through this break, the army of Ras Mulugeta made its escape as it fell back towards Amba Alagi and Sekota. Mulugeta planned to reassemble his forces around Amba Alagi.

== Aftermath ==
The Italian Air Force harried the fleeing army of Ras Mulugeta, dropping forty tons of mustard gas on the retreating Ethiopians over four days. In addition to this, the local Azebo Galla were bribed by the Italians to attack the Ethiopian stragglers.

Tadessa Mulugeta, Ras Mulugeta's son, was the asmach (Note: Roughly equivalent to commander of the rear guard.) on Amba Aradam. He was killed in an action against a party of Galla and his body was mutilated by them. When Ras Mulugeta received news of this, he turned back and was killed by a strafing plane. Attacked from the air and from the ground, what was left of the army of Ras Mulugeta dissolved.

Badoglio now turned his attention from the Ethiopian right back to the Ethiopian centre and Ras Kassa and Ras Seyoum, resulting in the Second Battle of Tembien.

== In popular culture ==
The corrupted form ambaradàn entered Italian language with the meaning of 'messy, complex situation'.

== See also ==
- Ethiopian Order of Battle Second Italo-Abyssinian War
- Army of the Ethiopian Empire
- List of Second Italo-Ethiopian War weapons of Ethiopia
- Italian Order of Battle Second Italo-Abyssinian War
- Royal Italian Army
- List of Italian military equipment in the Second Italo-Ethiopian War

== Bibliography ==
- Barker, A.J. (1971). Rape of Ethiopia, 1936. New York: Ballantine Books. pp. 160 pages. ISBN 978-0-345-02462-6.
- Barker, A.J. (1968). The Civilizing Mission: A History of the Italo-Ethiopian War of 1935–1936. New York: Dial Press. OCLC 413879.
- Laffin, John (1995). Brassey's Dictionary of Battles. New York: Barnes & Noble Books. pp. 501 pages. ISBN 0-7607-0767-7.
- Nicolle, David (1997). The Italian Invasion of Abyssinia 1935–1936. Westminster, MD: Osprey. pp. 48 pages. ISBN 978-1-85532-692-7.
