= List of conflicts in Ethiopia =

Map showing the present-day location of the Federal Democratic Republic of Ethiopia within East Africa.

This is a list of conflicts in Ethiopia arranged chronologically from medieval to modern times. This list includes both nationwide and international types of war, including (but not limited to) the following: wars of independence, liberation wars, colonial wars, undeclared wars, proxy wars, territorial disputes, and world wars. Also listed might be any battle that occurred within the territory of what is today known as the, "Federal Democratic Republic of Ethiopia" but was itself only part of an operation of a campaign of a theater of a war. There may also be periods of violent civil unrest listed, such as: riots, shootouts, spree killings, massacres, terrorist attacks, and civil wars. The list might also contain episodes of: human sacrifice, mass suicide, massacres, and genocides.

== Medieval Times ==
=== Axumite Empire ===
- circa 300 C.E. Ezana of Axum anecdotally said to have launched several military campaigns, destroying the Kingdom of Kush
- 525 Conquest of the Himyarite Kingdom by Axum.
- 570-578 Aksumite-Persian wars
  - Battle of Hadhramaut
  - Siege of Sanaa (570)
- c. 900 The King of Aksum Degna Djan, both led military expeditions as far south as Ennarea, and commanded missionary activities in the highlands of Angot and the modern region of Amhara.
- c. 960 Axumite Empire said to have been destroyed and defeated by Gudit of the Kingdom of Simien

=== Ethiopian Empire ===
- c. 1285 The Conquest of Shewa by the Ifat Sultanate
- 1314–1344 Conquests of the Emperor Amda Seyon I
  - c. 1316 Early military actions
    - c. 1316 Emperor Amda Seyon I successfully campaigned against the Paganist of Damot and The Muslim Kingdom of Hadiya.
  - c. 1320 "Rebellion" of Haqq ad-Din I
  - c. 1329 Northern campaigns
  - c. 1332 Later campaigns
  - c. 1300s-1415 Second Abyssnian conquest of the Sultanate of Ifat
- 1445 Adal invasion of Ethiopia

== Modern Times ==
=== Ethiopian Empire ===
- 1529–1543 Ethiopian-Adal War
  - March 1529 Battle of Shimbra Kure
  - 1531 Battle of Antukyah
  - 28 October 1531 Battle of Amba Sel
  - 24 April 1541 Battle of Sahart
  - 2 February 1542 Battle of Baçente
  - 4 April 1542 – 16 April 1542 Battle of Jarte
  - August 1542 Battle of the Hill of the Jews
  - 28 August 1542 Battle of Wofla
  - 21 February 1543 Battle of Wayna Daga
- Ottoman–Ethiopian War (1557–1589)
  - Sack of Harar (1559)
  - 1576 Battle of Webi River
  - December 1578 Battle of Addi Qarro
- 1769–1855 Zemene Mesafint
  - 1832–1848 Ottoman–Ethiopian border conflicts
- December 1867 – May 1868 British Expedition to Abyssinia
- 1877 – 1904 Conquests of Menelik II
  - 1875–1881 War with Ottoman Egypt
  - 1885 War with Sudan
- 1881–1899 Mahdist War
  - 14 October 1888 Battle of Guté Dili

The Ethiopian Empire during the reign of Menelik II Ethiopian Empire before conquests Ethiopian Empire after conquests

- 1895–1896 First Italo-Ethiopia War
  - 1 March 1896 Battle of Adwa
  - 7 December 1895 Battle of Amba Alagi
  - 13 January 1895 Battle of Coatit
- 3 October 1935 – May 1936 Second Italo-Abyssinian War
  - 3 October 1935 – December 1935 De Bono's invasion of Abyssinia
  - 15 December 1935 – 20 January 1936 Ethiopian Christmas Offensive
  - 12 January 1936 – 20 January 1936 Battle of Genale Doria
  - 20 January 1936 – 24 January 1936 First Battle of Tembien
  - 1 February 1936 – 19 February 1936 Battle of Amba Aradam
  - 27 February 1936 – 29 February 1936 Second Battle of Tembien
  - 29 February 1936 – 2 March 1936 Battle of Shire
  - 31 March 1936 Battle of Maychew
  - 14 April 1936 – 25 April 1936 Battle of the Ogaden
  - 26 April 1936 – 5 May 1936 March of the Iron Will
- 1 September 1939 – 2 September 1945 World War II
  - 10 June 1940 – 2 May 1945 Mediterranean and Middle East theatre
    - 10 June 1940 – 27 November 1941 East African Campaign

=== Italian East Africa ===
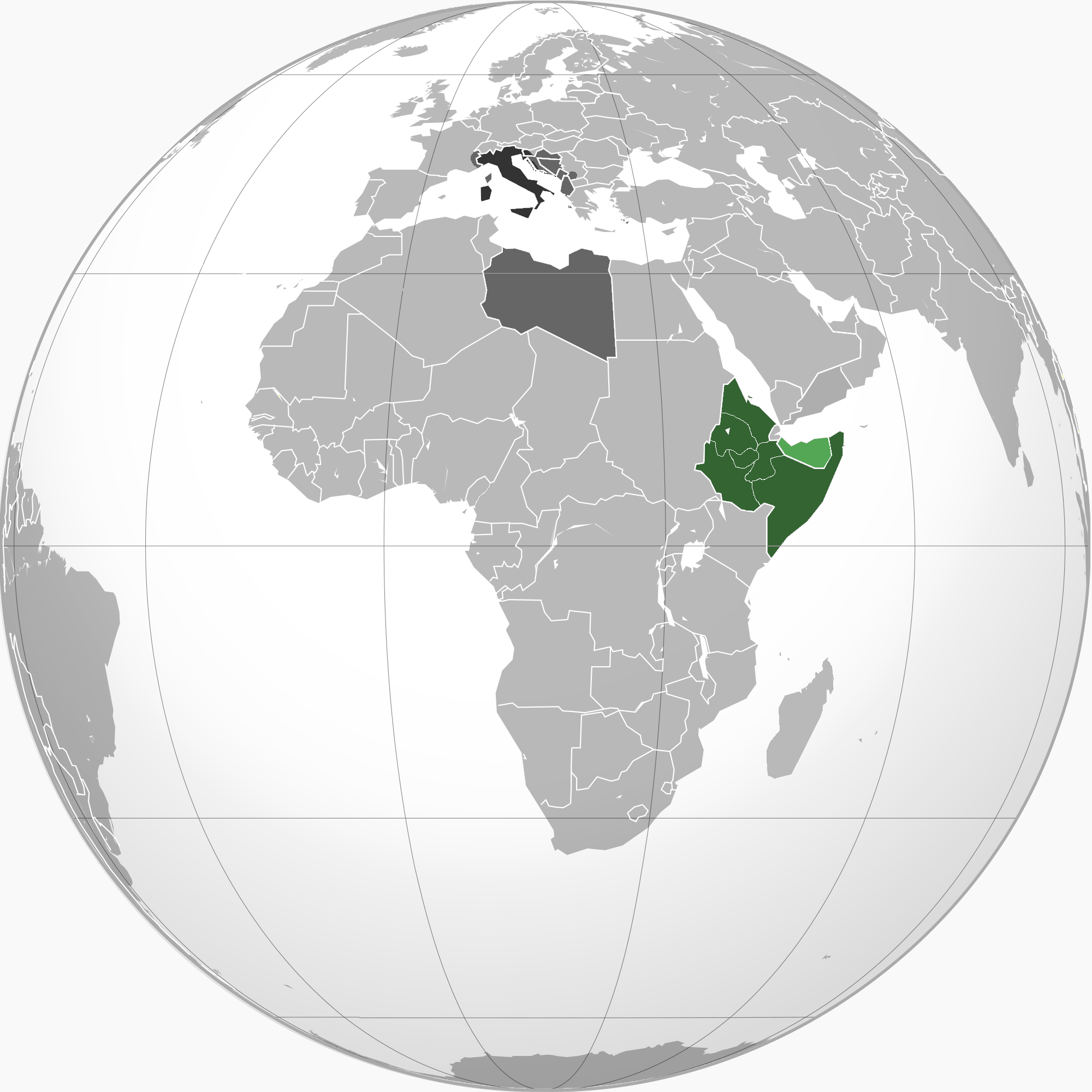
Italian East Africa in 1936. Italian East Africa Conquered in 1940 Possessions and occupied territories Kingdom of Italy

- 3 October 1935 – May 1936 Second Italo-Abyssinian War
  - 3 October 1935 – December 1935 De Bono's invasion of Abyssinia
  - 15 December 1935 – 20 January 1936 Ethiopian Christmas Offensive
  - 12 January 1936 – 20 January 1936 Battle of Genale Doria
  - 20 January 1936 – 24 January 1936 First Battle of Tembien
  - 1 February 1936 – 19 February 1936 Battle of Amba Aradam
  - 27 February 1936 – 29 February 1936 Second Battle of Tembien
  - 29 February 1936 – 2 March 1936 Battle of Shire
  - 31 March 1936 Battle of Maychew
  - 14 April 1936 – 25 April 1936 Battle of the Ogaden
  - 26 April 1936 – 5 May 1936 March of the Iron Will
- 1 September 1939 – 2 September 1945 World War II
  - 10 June 1940 – 2 May 1945 Mediterranean and Middle East theatre
    - 10 June 1940 – 27 November 1941 East African Campaign

=== Federation of Ethiopia and Eritrea ===
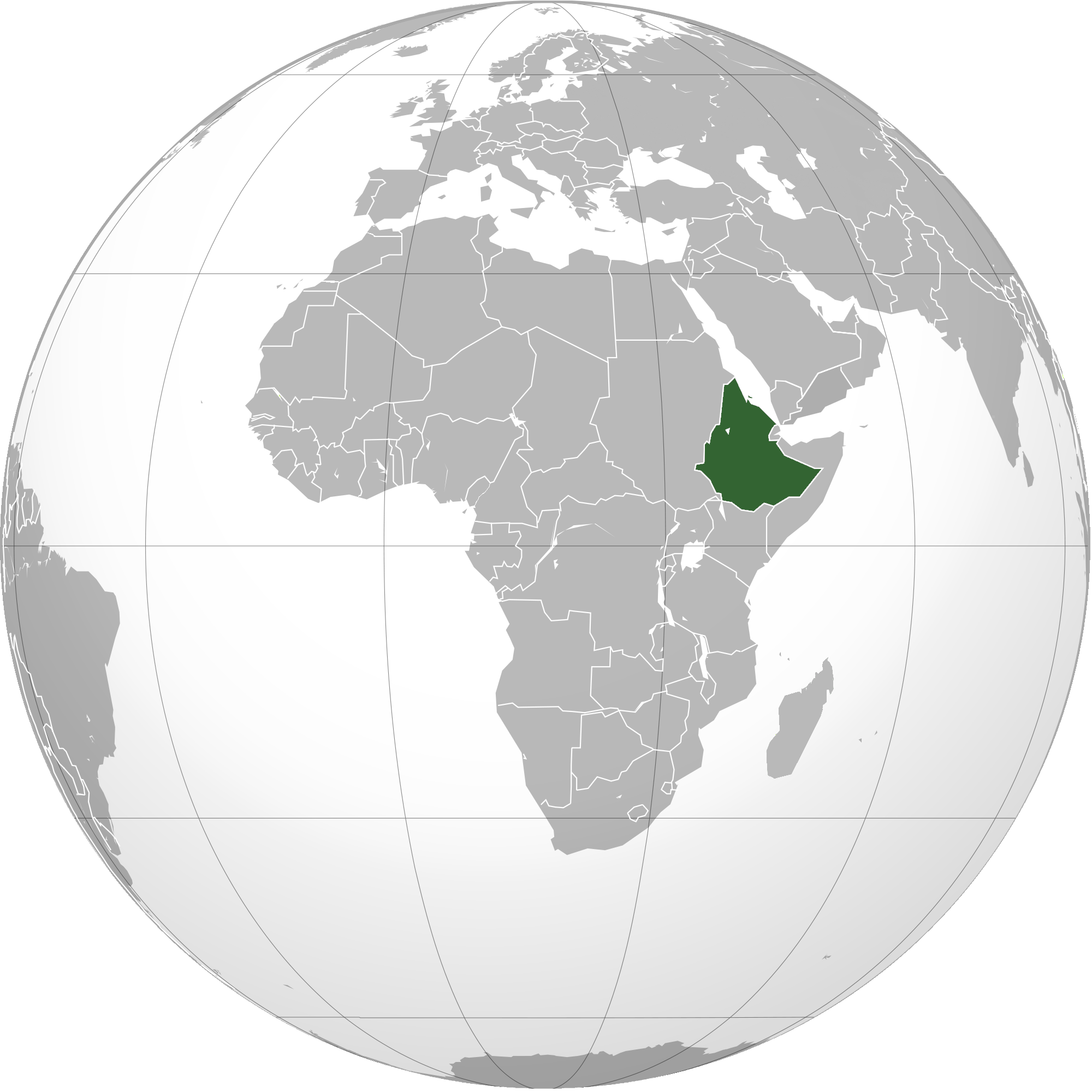
Location of the Federation of Ethiopia and Eritrea in the Horn of Africa.

- 1 September 1961 – 29 May 1991 Eritrean War of Independence

=== Ethiopian Empire ===
- 12 September 1974 – 28 May 1991 Ethiopian Civil War

=== Provisional Military Government of Socialist Ethiopia ===
- 13 July 1977 – 15 March 1978 Ethio-Somali War
- June 1982 – August 1982 Ethiopian–Somali Border War

=== Transitional Government of Ethiopia ===
- 1992 – Ongoing Oromo conflict
- 1995 – Ongoing Insurgency in Ogaden

=== Federal Democratic Republic of Ethiopia ===
- 6 May 1998 – 25 May 2000 Eritrean–Ethiopian War
- 7 October 2002 – Ongoing Operation Enduring Freedom – Horn of Africa
- 2018 – Ongoing Ethiopian civil conflict (2018–present)
  - 3 November 2020 – 3 November 2022 Tigray War
  - 9 April 2023 – Ongoing Fano insurgency
  - 29 January 2026 – 1 February 2026 Tigray clashes (January-February 2026)
  - 23 September 2026 – Ongoing 2026 Ethiopian offensive

== See also ==
- List of wars involving Ethiopia
- Military history of Ethiopia
- Ethiopian National Defense Force
- Ethiopian Air Force
- Military history of Africa
- African military systems up until the year 1800
- African military systems between the years 1800 and 1900
- African military systems after the year 1900
