= Battle of Maychew =

1936 battle of the Second Italo-Ethiopian War

- Part of the Second Italo-Abyssinian War
Date	31 March 1936
Location	Near Maychew, Tigray, Ethiopia
Result	Italian victory

Belligerents
Italy: Italian Eritrea	Ethiopia

Commanders and leaders
(Kingdom of Italy) Pietro Badoglio	(Ethiopian Empire) Haile Selassie

Strength
40,000 (with another 40,000 in reserve)	31,000 (including six battalions of the Imperial Guard); 20 field guns

Casualties and losses
400 Italians killed & wounded 873 Eritreans killed & wounded Total: 1,273	1,000–8,000 killed Total: 11,000

The Battle of Maychew (Italian: Mai Ceu) was the last major battle fought on the northern front during the Second Italo-Ethiopian War. The battle consisted of a failed counterattack by the Ethiopian forces under Emperor Haile Selassie making frontal assaults against prepared Italian defensive positions under the command of Marshal Pietro Badoglio. The battle was fought near Maychew (Mai Ceu), Ethiopia, in the modern region of Tigray.

== Background ==
On 3 October 1935, General Emilio De Bono advanced into Ethiopia from Eritrea without a declaration of war, leading a force of approximately 100,000 Italian and 25,000 Eritrean soldiers towards the Ethiopian capital of Addis Ababa. In December, after a brief period of inactivity and minor setbacks for the Italians, De Bono was replaced by Badoglio.

Under Badoglio, the advance on Addis Ababa was renewed. Badoglio overwhelmed the armies of ill-armed and uncoordinated Ethiopian warriors with mustard gas, tanks, and heavy artillery. He defeated the Ethiopian armies at the Battle of Amba Aradam, the Second Battle of Tembien, and the Battle of Shire.

=== Korem and Maychew ===
On 1 March 1936, Emperor Haile Selassie arrived by foot at his new headquarters in Korem. He arrived forty years to the day from the decisive Ethiopian victory at Adwa during the First Italo-Ethiopian War. On 19 March, both Ras (Note: Roughly equivalent to Duke and army commander.) Kassa Haile Darge and Ras Seyum Mangasha made their way to Korem to join the Emperor. In addition, Ras Getachew Abate arrived with a fresh army from Kaffa Province. The Emperor divided his army into four groups. He arranged that one group would be commanded directly by himself and that the other three groups would be commanded by Ras Kassa, Ras Seyum, and Ras Getachew.

Compared to other Ethiopian forces, Haile Selasie's army was extremely well armed. He had an artillery regiment of twenty 75mm field guns, some Oerlikon 37mm guns, and even a few 81mm Brandt mortars. However, compared to the resources available to Badoglio, Haile Selasie's army was hopelessly outmatched. To even things up, the Emperor handed out between ten and fifteen dollars and distributed other gifts to the Oromo people of Raya Azebo (Italian: Azebu Galla). In exchange, they swore their allegiance to him and agreed to attack the Italian flanks.

Badoglio had the four divisions of the Italian I Army Corps and the three divisions of the Eritrean Corps at Maychew. Before the battle, the Marshal explained: "The Emperor has three choices. To attack, and be defeated; to wait for our attack, and we will win anyway; or to retreat, which is disastrous for an army that lacks means of transport and proper organisation for food and munitions." Badoglio also enjoyed the intelligence edge of being able to intercept most of the Ethiopian radio communications, as well as the mobility of mechanized infantry.

On 21 March, Haile Selassie sent a radio message to his wife, Empress Menen Asfaw:

"Since our trust in our Creator and in the hope of His help and as we have decided to advance and enter the fortifications and since God is our only help, confide this decision in secret to the Abuna, to the ministers and to the dignitaries and offer unto God our fervent prayers."

As soon as Badoglio intercepted this message indicating that Haile Selassie had decided to advance, he cancelled orders for his own proposed offensive. Instead, Badoglio would prepare defensive positions for an Ethiopian attack.

On 23 March, looking across a lush green valley towards the Italian positions at Maychew, the Emperor contemplated his decision to strike first. His army was the last intact Ethiopian army between Badoglio and Addis Ababa. He decided he would direct the attack personally in accordance with tradition and the expectation of his followers. Six battalions of the Imperial Guard (Kebur Zabangna) would be part of his force of approximately 31,000 fighters. Haile Selassie chose to attack against the advice of his foreign experts and against his own better judgement.

Had Haile Selassie attacked on 24 March as he originally planned, things may have gone differently; many of the Italians had only recently arrived at Maychew after the fall of Amba Aradam. But, during a week frittered away by the Ethiopians in war councils, banquets, and prayers, the Italians had time to strengthen their defenses and time to bring up reserves.

== Battle ==
At dawn on 31 March 1936, the attack was launched. It was St. George's Day. The attack began at 0545 hours and continued for thirteen hours with little or no let up.

The Italians had been "standing to" in the front line positions all night, alerted to the attack by an Ethiopian deserter. The mountain troops (Alpini) of the 5th Alpine Division "Pusteria" were dug in on the slopes of Amba Bokora for the Italian I Corps. The rest of the I Corps was in reserve, the 26th Infantry Division "Assietta", the 30th Infantry Division "Sabauda", and the 4th CC.NN. Division "3 Gennaio". The two Eritrean divisions of the Eritrean Corps held Mekan Pass, the 1st Eritrean Division and the 2nd Eritrean Division. The 1st CC.NN. Division "23 Marzo" was in reserve for the Eritrean Corps.

The Ethiopians advanced in three columns of 3,000 men each. In the first attacks, the Ethiopians hurled themselves at the Italian positions in waves. The fury of the attack and surprisingly accurate mortar fire carried the Ethiopians well into the defensive lines of the "Pusteria" Division. But the mountain troops struck back and soon the front lines were stabilized.

=== Switch to the left flank ===
The Ethiopians switched the focus of their attack and fifteen thousand men under Ras Kassa advanced against the Eritreans holding Mekan Pass on the Italian left flank. Haile Selassie hoped to face less resistance from the Eritreans. (Note: Barker states this.) From 0700 to 0800 hours, the Ethiopians kept up a steady onslaught and, despite taking heavy casualties, were beginning to make gains. But at 0800 Badoglio unleashed the bombers of the Italian Royal Air Force (Regia Aeronautica) and the Ethiopians could hear the ominous engine roar as they closed in with poison gas.

=== Imperial Guard sent in ===
Haile Selassie now played his trump card. The Imperial Guard, under the command of Ras Getachew Abate, was sent in against the Eritreans. The training and discipline of this elite force was apparent in the methodical mode of their advance over the open ground. For three hours they struggled to roll up the Italian flank. The X Battalion of the 2nd Eritrean Division was virtually annihilated. In the end, the Italian commander of the unit called down concentrated artillery fire onto his own overrun positions and saved the day.

=== Last attack ===
By 1600 hours, it was apparent that the Imperial Guard was not going to be able to capture their objectives and Haile Selassie played his last card. He ordered an attack along the entire front. This last desperate action was again made by three columns, it was made under a heavily overcast sky, and it was made with little chance of success. The Ethiopians attacked everywhere and were driven back. It was at this point that the Azebu Galla, who had been on the sidelines, made their allegiance clear and attacked the withdrawing Ethiopians.

Haile Selassie's order to retreat was to be late in coming. He placed Ras Getachew Abate as Asmach. (Note: Roughly equivalent to Commander of the Rear Guard.) But the Ethiopians had lost many front line commanders, the soldiers had not eaten since before dawn, and discipline had understandably broken down. To make matters even worse, as the Ethiopians fled from the battlefield, they were mercilessly bombed from above by the Italian Royal Air Force and harassed on the ground by the Azebu Galla.

== After the battle ==
On the evening of 31 March, Haile Selassie sent another message to his wife:

"From five in the morning until seven in the evening our troops attacked the enemy's strong positions, fighting without pause. We also took part in the action and by the grace of God remain unharmed. Our chief and trusted soldiers are dead or wounded. Although our losses are heavy, the enemy too has been injured. The Guard fought magnificently and deserve every praise. The Amhara troops also did their best. Our troops, even though they are not adapted for fighting of the European type, were able to bear comparison throughout the day with the Italian troops."

Many of the Ethiopian commanders now prepared to make for their own lands. Dejazmach (Note: Roughly equivalent to Commander of the Gate.) Wondosson Kassa, one of Ras Kassa's sons, was to go to Lasta south of Wag, his grandfather's country. In Lasta the inhabitants were both warlike and loyal to the "Shoan Emperor," Haile Selassie. Dejazmach Aberra Kassa, one of Ras Kassa's other sons was to go to the Kassa fief of Salale in northern Shoa. Ras Seyum was ordered to return to Tigray and wage guerrilla war. Ras Kassa and Asmach Getachew, with the remnants of their own forces and with the remnants of the Guard, accompanied Haile Selassie as he made his way into the friendly highlands of Wag and Lasta and away from the snarling Oromos of Raya Azebo.

== Retreat ==
On the night of 2 April, the Emperor finally ordered a retreat. The retreating columns set off before dawn the next day towards Lake Hashenge and the highlands of Korem. Haile Selassie, wearing a pith helmet, rode a white horse and the retreat was initially not chaotic. In the early morning, circumstances changed as two latent threats materialized. The Azebo Oromos started attacking the flanks and Italian aircraft arrived. The Imperial Guard, as part of the rear guard commanded by Asmach Getachew, lost more men over the next two days than were lost during the battle.

Late on 3 April, the Ethiopian columns reached Korem and the relative safety of the highlands. It was now decided that the columns would be dispersed. As a result, all semblance of order and organization were lost. In the early morning of 4 April, the battle weary and thirsty survivors of the Emperor's army struggled towards Lake Ashangi. Roughly 20,000 Ethiopians crossed the open plain towards Lake Ashangi and, due to brutal attacks from the Azebo Oromos and due to near continuous attacks from the air, thousands would be lost before they got close to the lake's shore. Worse, the water of Lake Ashangi had been sprayed with deadly chemicals by the Italian Royal Air Force and was poisoned by the time the Emperor's army arrived, causing soldiers to die both from fumes and from drinking the water. Late on 4 April, Haile Selassie looked with despair upon the horrific sight of the dead bodies of much of his army ringing the poisoned lake.

=== Pilgrimage to Lalibella and plan to stand at Dessie ===
It was believed among the Ethiopians that it might be possible to make a stand at Dessie. The Crown Prince Asfa Wossen had been sent there to raise a new army. With the Crown Prince in Dessie were Shum (Note: Roughly equivalent to Governor.) Wadajo Ali and Fitawrari (Note: Roughly equivalent to Commander of the Advanced Guard.) Fikremariam. Wadajo Ali was the "real" Governor of Wollo and Fikremariam commanded the Guard and the Shewan garrison at Dessie. Ammunition and supplies were accumulated in anticipation of protracted operations in the north.

Before getting to Dessie, the Emperor decided to make a pilgrimage to the holy city of Lalibella. Included in the Emperor's retinue was Coptic Abuna (Note: Roughly equivalent to Metropolitan Bishop.) Petros, Etchage (Note: Roughly equivalent to Abbot.) Gabre Giyorgis, Ras Kassa, Dejazmach Adafersaw Yenadu, Dejazmach Wondosson Kassa, and Dejazmach Aberra Kassa. From 12 April the Emperor spent three days there in prayer. On 15 April, Haile Selassie left Lalibella and rejoined his army as it continued its plodding march towards Dessie. At Magdala, the Emperor was to learn that the Crown Prince had abandoned Dessie on 14 April without firing a shot. He also learned that the city was already occupied by the Eritreans. The Emperor's column turned towards Worra Ilu, but runners then brought the news that Worra Ilu had fallen too. By forced march, the Emperor and his party made their way to Fikke in Salale.

On 20 April, Marshal Badoglio flew to Dessie. He noted great strips of cloth stretched across the decorated streets. On the cloth, the local population had written: "The Hawk has flown."

On 26 April, when Badoglio launched his "March of the Iron Will" towards Addis Ababa, he faced no meaningful Ethiopian resistance.

=== Addis Ababa ===
From Fikke, Haile Selassie made his way towards Addis Ababa. By 1 May, he had arrived in the capital. This was one month after the Battle of Maychew. With him were Ras Kassa and Asmach Getachew. When the Emperor arrived, he found a city in a state of near panic.

== See also ==
- Ethiopian Order of Battle Second Italo-Abyssinian War
- Army of the Ethiopian Empire
- List of Second Italo-Ethiopian War weapons of Ethiopia
- Italian Order of Battle Second Italo-Abyssinian War
- Royal Italian Army
- List of Italian military equipment in the Second Italo-Ethiopian War
