= Ayalew Birru =

Ethiopian army commander

- Ras
- Born: 1892
- Died: May 1945 (aged 52–53)
- Dynasty: Shewa dynasty
- Occupation: Commander in Chief
- Military career
- Conflicts: Second Italo-Ethiopian War: Battle of Shire; Christmas Offensive; March on Gondar

Ayalew Birru, or Ayyalaw Birru, (1892 - May 1945) was an Ethiopian army commander, a patriot, and a cousin of Emperor Haile Selassie I.

== Biography ==
Ayalew Birru was born in Begemder and was the son of Ras (Note: Roughly equivalent to Duke.) Birru Wolde Gabriel (Note: Some sources indicate that Birru Wolde Gabriel was Menelik's "natural" son.) and Woizero (Note: Roughly equivalent to Dame.) Geseseche Marso. Ayalew Birru was a relative of Taytu Betul. From 1883 to 1913, Taytu was the wife of Emperor Menelek II and, from 1889 to 1913, she was Empress of the Ethiopian Empire. Birru Wolde Gabriel was even rumoured to be the "natural" son of Menelik.

During his lifetime, Ayalew Birru held a number of important governorships. From 1916, he was Shum (Note: Roughly equivalent to Governor.) of Wagara. From 1928, he was Shum of Semien Province. From 1917 to 1918, after Lij (Note: Roughly equivalent to Child.) Iyasu was deposed, Ayalew Birru was made the Commander-in-Chief of the Imperial Army by Ras Tafari Makonnen.

On 18 January 1918, Ayalew Birru married Woizerit Hoy (Note: Roughly equivalent to Great Lady.) Manyahilush Kassa. Manyahilush was the second daughter of Ras Kassa Haile Darge. Ayalew Birru and Manyahilush Kassa had children including a son.

Late in 1928, the Raya people revolted in Wollo Province. Negus (Note: Roughly equivalent to King.) Tafari Makonnen called for the governors of several neighboring provinces to suppress the revolt. Dejazmach (Note: Equivalent to Commander of the Gate.) Ayalew Birru, as Shum of Semien, was one of the governors called upon. Unlike many of the others called upon, Ayalew Birru strenuously fought the revolting people in Lasta. Because of this, Ras Gugsa Welle, Shum of Begemder Province was able to take advantage of his absence in Semien. While Ayalew Birru was away, Gugsa Welle managed to bring most of Simien under his own control. Gugsa Welle and Ayalew Birru were cousins and both were closely related to Empress Taytu Betel. (Note: Some sources indicate that Gugsa Welle was Ayalew Birru's uncle.)

In 1930, Ras Gugsa Welle's desire to remove Negus Tafari led to his raising an army in rebellion against him. As Qegnazmach, (Note: Equivalent to Commander of the Right.) Ayalew Birru led a portion of the Imperial Army against the rebelling Ras Gugsa Welle and was one of the heroes of the Battle of Anchem. However, because he was seen as being too closely related to Empress Taytu Betel, Ayalew Birru was not made a Ras as a result of his heroism. His people sang of his plight: "Ayalew the fool, the innocent; Trust men, trusts men."

In 1931, Ayalew Birru was rewarded by being named Fitawrari (Note: Roughly equivalent to Commander of the Vanguard.) and Minister of War. Between 1933 and 1934, Ayalew Birru fell into disfavor with the Emperor; most likely over money. As result, he was exiled to Arsi Province.

In 1935, during the Second Italo-Ethiopian War, Ayalew Birru returned from exile and again supported the Emperor against his enemy. However, his initial support for the war was less than wholehearted. When ordered to harass and possibly invade the western Eritrean lowlands, he fell ill. According to a Swedish doctor flown in to help him, Ayalew Birru "underwent a cure, abiding his time." His illness verged on the "diplomatic" and, after it was indicated that he had made contact with the Italians, his loyalty was questioned. In the end, it must be remembered that Fitawrari Ayalew Birru was a war leader of great reputation. He was no callow and untried princeling. Ayalew Birru joined forces with the forces of Ras Imru Haile Selassie and, in late 1935, advanced against the Italians during the Christmas Offensive. His forces played a significant part in the Battle at Dembeguina Pass. In early March 1936, the Battle of Shire was lost by the Ethiopians and Ayalew Birru left the site of the Battle headed homeward. However, when it became clear that the Italians had entered his Semien Province, he went to Debre Tabor in Begemder Province.

By May 1936, Ethiopia's armies had been defeated and the war was lost. When the Emperor went into exile, Ayalew Birru followed him to Jerusalem in the British Mandate of Palestine. Ayalew Birru remained in Palestine until the Second World War when he traveled to Khartoum in the Sudan. On 12 July 1940, Ayalew Birru attended a meeting called by the Emperor to discuss the invasion of Italian East Africa. When there were complaints about the quality of the rifles being supplied by the British, he was sent by the Emperor to inspect the military equipment in Begemder Province.

In 1941, during the East African Campaign, Birru Ayalew was again at the side of the Emperor and he was made the putative commander of Arbegnoch forces in Begemder.

After the war, Ayalew Birru was named a Ras and served for a time as the Shum of Kaffa and Jimma.

== See also ==
- Ethiopian aristocratic and court titles
- Ethiopian Order of Battle Second Italo-Abyssinian War

== Notes ==
Footnotes

Citations
