= Christmas Offensive =

Battle of the Second Italo-Ethiopian War

- Part of the Second Italo-Ethiopian War
- Troop movements during the Christmas Offensive
Date	14 December 1935 – 27 December 1935
Location	Northern Ethiopia
Result	Ethiopian victory

Belligerents
Italy: Italian Eritrea	Ethiopia

Commanders and leaders
(Kingdom of Italy) Pietro Badoglio	(Ethiopian Empire) Ras Imru (Ethiopian Empire) Ras Kassa (Ethiopian Empire) Ras Seyoum

Units involved
I Corps; III Corps	Army of Gojjam; Army of Tigray; Army of Begemder

Strength
125,000	190,000

Casualties and losses
731 killed 6 tanks destroyed 18 tanks captured 33 field guns captured	~500 killed

The Christmas Offensive took place during the Second Italo-Ethiopian War. The Ethiopian offensive was more of a counteroffensive to an ever-slowing Italian offensive which started the war. Ethiopian victory at the Battle at Dembeguina Pass successfully pushed the Italians back and recaptured the town of Shire. However, the Ethiopian offensive was eventually stopped by the Italian use of superior weaponry, such as machine guns, heavy artillery, and chemical warfare agents.

== Background ==
On 3 October 1935, Italian General Emilio De Bono invaded Abyssinia. De Bono's advance continued methodically, deliberately, and, to the consternation of Italian dictator Benito Mussolini, somewhat slowly. On the 8 November, the I Corps and the Eritrean Corps captured Makale. This proved to be the limit of how far the Italian invaders would progress under the command of De Bono. Increasing pressure from the rest of the world on Mussolini caused him to need quick victories, and he was not prepared to hear of obstacles or delays from De Bono. On the 16 November, De Bono was promoted to the rank of Marshal of Italy (Maresciallo d'Italia); however, on 17 December he was replaced by Marshal Pietro Badoglio on the northern front because of the slow, cautious nature of De Bono's advance.

On the 30 November 1935, Nəgusä Nägäst (Note: Usually translated as King of Kings or Emperor.) Haile Selassie moved his field headquarters to Dessie. Ras Imru Haile Selassie with approximately 40,000 men advanced from Gojjam toward Mai Timket to the left of Ras Seyoum. In a push towards Warieu Pass, Ras Kassa Haile Darge with approximately 40,000 men advanced from Gondar to support Ras Seyoum in the center. Ras Mulugeta Yeggazu, the Minister of War, advanced from Dessie with approximately 80,000 men to take positions on and around Amba Aradam to the right of Ras Seyoum. Amba Aradam was a steep sided, flat topped mountain directly in the way of an Italian advance on Addis Ababa.

The four commanders had approximately 190,000 men facing approximately 125,000 Italians and Eritreans. Ras Imru and his Army of Gojjam was on the Ethiopian left, Ras Seyoum and his Army of Tigray and Ras Kassa and his Army of Begemder in the center, and Ras Mulugeta and the Mahel Sefari (Note: Equivalent to Central Army.) on the right. The ambitious Ethiopian plan called for Ras Kassa and Ras Seyoum to split the Italian army in two and isolate the Italian I Army Corps and the Italian III Army Corps in Makale. Ras Mulugeta would then descend from Amba Aradam and crush both corps. According to this plan, after Ras Imru retook Adwa, he was to invade Eritrea.

The Italians received the first signs of an impending Ethiopian counteroffensive in early December 1935, after aerial reconnaissance reported significant gatherings of armed men both along the main route (leading from Mekele to Addis Ababa), north of Amba Alagi, and on the road from Gondar to Tekeze. Other troops were also spotted moving toward the Gheva River, clearly intent on crossing into Tembien. The air force made several attempts to attack these armies, attempting to delay their advance, but the Abyssinians made the most of their knowledge of the country and their ability to disperse and camouflage themselves, marching at night and skillfully exploiting the territory's resources. This allowed the Ethiopians to move quickly, without heavy burdens and without the logistical constraints that limited modern armies.

== The offensive ==
According to the available figures, the numerically strongest army was that led by Ras Imru, who together with the forces of Ayalew Birru could count on around 20,000 men; between 14 and 15 December around 2,000 of them crossed the Tekeze where they were immediately engaged by the irregulars of Major Luigi Criniti. Another 3,000 soldiers of Ras Imru crossed the river around fifteen kilometres further north, heading towards the Dembeguina Pass with the intention of cutting off the only retreat route for Criniti's men. The Italian columns were taken by surprise and, when Criniti's men tried to force the passage, the Ethiopian forces were already deployed in a horseshoe shape on the surrounding ridges; a squadron of L3/35 tanks, sent forward to open a gap, was easily neutralized by Ras Imru's soldiers, Criniti was wounded and two of his officers, Ettore Crippa and Franco Martelli were killed. After this, Ras Imru reached the first Italian outpost of Shire Enda Selassie garrisoned by 2nd Eritrean Battalion Group led by Captain Carlo Emanuele Basile, who immediately abandoned the town and retreated east. After the Ethiopians took Shire, a Blackshirt paramilitary column of trucks and ten tanks were sent to counter attack and retake the town, but they were repelled and forced to retreat.

Towards evening the Italian forces managed to move towards Selekleka, garrisoned by the 24th Infantry "Gran Sasso" Division, but the Ethiopian advance had not stopped and, despite the violent Italian aerial bombardments and the dropping of mustard gas on the fords of the Tekeze on 18 December, Imru's approximately 20,000 men managed to cross the river and spread towards the north-east, threatening the entrenched camps of Axum and Adwa and the borders with Eritrea. Realizing the risk, Badoglio ordered the "Gran Sasso" to retreat towards the fortified lines of Axum, but the order generated no small amount of alarm throughout the Italian expeditionary force; thousands of soldiers were immediately employed to further fortify the defensive lines of Axum and Mekelle, while the fear that the enemy could be aided by spies and presumed partisans led to the arrest of hundreds of suspects, especially among the Coptic clergy, who were suspected of inciting the population against the Italians.

Simultaneously with Ras Imru's advance, approximately 5,000 men under Hailu Kebede and 3,000 Tigrayans under the command of two of Ras Seyoum's subordinates advanced on Abiy Addi and spread into Tembien, despite the bombing raids by the air force, which Badoglio had ordered to slow the enemy advance as much as possible. On December 18, the Ethiopians attacked the four Eritrean battalions of the 1st Brigade led by Ruggero Tracchia from the position of Amba Tzellerè, which was repelled. However, on December 22 the Eritreans under Colonel Tracchia unsuccessfully launched a counter attack against the Ethiopians on Amba Tzellerè, which was repelled with heavy losses. The Italians then retreated to Abbi Addi, which was set on fire and abandoned on December 27, then entrenching themselves on the Uarieu pass despite the continuous attacks of the Ethiopians who, by now, had reoccupied all of southern Tembien.

Faced with the vast Ethiopian assault of Ras Seyoum and Imru, to which was added the large manoeuvre of Ras Mulugeta who had advanced as far as the Gabat torrent a few kilometres from Mekelle, Badoglio urgently asked Rome to send two more divisions, but throughout January he continued to suffer the enemy's action, limiting himself to wearing down the adversary with repeated aerial bombardments and with the widespread use of chemical weapons. From 22 December to 18 January, in fact, over 2,000 quintals of gas bombs were dropped on the northern regions of the empire, in particular in the Tekeze area: in this way, soldiers and farmers who used those waters to quench their thirst were indiscriminately hit.

== Aftermath ==
Although the Ethiopian victory led to the reconquest of Shire and a good part of Tembien, the Italian military superiority remained overwhelming. In early January 1936, the Ethiopian forces on the "northern front" were in the hills everywhere overlooking the Italian positions and launching attacks against them on a regular basis. Mussolini was impatient for an Italian offensive to get under way and for the Ethiopians to be swept from the field. In response to his frequent exhortations, Badoglio cabled Mussolini: "It has always been my rule to be meticulous in preparation so that I may be swift in action."

Fortunately for the Italians on the "southern front", Ras Desta Damtew did little in 1935 and his invasion of Italian Somaliland did not get under way until early January 1936. By then his army had been reduced to approximately 15,000 men, less than one-quarter of its size when first raised in Sidamo Province. Ultimately, Desta Damtew's offensive became known as the disastrous Battle of Genale Doria.

In addition to being granted permission to use poison gas, Badoglio received additional ground forces; elements of the Italian III and IV Corps arrived in Eritrea during early 1936. What followed was a series of battles starting with the First Battle of Tembien. On 20 January, the beginning of the inconclusive First Battle of Tembien marked the end of the Ethiopian "Christmas Offensive" and also marked a shift of the offensive back to the Italians.

== See also ==
- Ethiopian Order of Battle Second Italo-Abyssinian War
- Army of the Ethiopian Empire
- List of Second Italo-Ethiopian War weapons of Ethiopia
- Italian Order of Battle Second Italo-Abyssinian War
- List of Italian military equipment in the Second Italo-Ethiopian War
- Royal Italian Army

== Notes ==
Footnotes

Citations
