= Fikremariam =

Ethiopian military commander (died 1937)

Fikremariam (unknown - 1937) was an Ethiopian commander and a patriot.

== Biography ==
Fikremariam was from Menz, an Amhara region of Shewa Province.

In 1930, during Gugsa Welle's Rebellion, Fitawrari (Note: Equivalent to Commander of the Advanced Guard or Vanguard.) Fikremariam fought on the side of Negus (Note: Roughly equivalent to King.) Tafari Makonnen. On 31 March, during the Battle of Anchem, Fikremariam commanded the left wing of the Imperial Army. The men in his command were from Wollo Province.

In 1936, during the Second Italo-Ethiopian War, Fitawrari Fikremariam commanded the Guard of Crown Prince Asfaw Wossen Tafari in Dessie. In addition, he commanded the Shewan garrison. But, when Emperor Haile Selassie and what was left of the retreating Imperial Army approached Dessie after the Battle of Maychew, they were told that the Eritreans had already occupied the city. In addition, the Emperor was told that, on 14 April, the Crown Prince had fled without a shot being fired.

From about May 1936 to about October 1937, during the Italian occupation of Ethiopia, Fikremariam fought as an Arbegnoch (Note: Equivalent to Ethiopian patriot.) until his death.

== See also ==
- Ethiopian aristocratic and court titles
- Ethiopian Order of Battle Second Italo-Abyssinian War

== Notes ==
Footnotes

Citations
