= Battle of Anchem =

1930 conflict in Ethiopia between Gugsa Wale and Empress Zewditu

- Part of Gugsa Wale's rebellion
Date	31 March 1930
Location	Debre Zebit in Semien, Ethiopia
Result	Gugsa Welle defeated and King Tafari Makonnen proclaimed as Emperor Haile Selassie I

Belligerents
Pro-Empress Zewditu faction Yejju (arrived late)	Pro-King Tafari Makonnen faction

Commanders and leaders
Gugsa Welle †	Tafari Makonnen; Mulugeta Yeggazu

Strength
Army of Begemder; 10,000 (down from a high of 35,000)	Army of the Center and about four provincial armies 20,000 (of a total of 32,000)

Casualties and losses
Entire army disintegrated	Unknown

The Battle of Anchem (also Battle of Anchiem or Battle of Anchim) was fought between two factions of the Royal family in the Ethiopian Empire (Mangista Iteeyop'p'ya). The battle was fought to determine who would rule the empire, Empress (Nigiste Negest) (Note: Equivalent to Queen of Kings or Empress Regnant) Zewditu or King (Negus) (Note: Roughly equivalent to King.) Tafari Makonnen.

The Battle of Anchem is memorable because the pro-Zewditu forces were not openly supported by Empress Zewditu. The battle is also memorable for the use of both psychological warfare and aerial warfare by the pro-Tafari forces.

== Background ==
On 27 October 1928, thirty-two-year-old Ras (Note: Roughly equivalent to Duke.) Tafari Makonnen, the future Emperor Haile Selassie I, was crowned King by Empress Zewditu. Since 1916, during Tafari's minority, Zewditu had been Regent and exercised the real power in Ethiopia. The crowning of Tafari as King caused him to begin exercising power at the expense of Zewditu. His crowning also caused two factions to develop within the royal court: One faction was pro-Tafari and one faction was pro-Zewditu. The husband of Zewditu and leader of the pro-Zewditu faction, fifty-three-year-old Ras Gugsa Welle, imagined a future where Zewditu remained Empress and he would be proclaimed Emperor.

Within a month of Tafari being crowned King, the Raya Oromo revolted in Wollo Province. As King and with the tacit approval of the Empress, Negus Tafari called for the governors of several neighboring provinces to suppress the Oromo revolt. Ras Seyum Mangasha from Axum in western Tigre, Ras Gugsa Araya Selassie from Makalle in eastern Tigre, Dejazmach (Note: Equivalent to Commander of the Gate.) Ayalew Birru from Semien, and Ras Gugsa Welle from Begemder were called upon. Gugsa Welle and others were unhappy with the rise of Negus Tafari. As a result, the response to Tafari's call was less than enthusiastic, efforts to suppress the Oromo were dissipated in palace intrigue, and the revolt continued. A trusted cousin of Tafari, Ras Imru Haile Selassie, was made Shum (Note: Roughly equivalent to Governor.) of Wollo in an effort to end the revolt.

In addition to not being happy with the rise of Tafari, Gugsa Welle tried to rally "traditional Ethiopia" to his side in support of his wife, the Empress. In the opinion of this faction, Tafari was too young, too modern, and it was rumored that he had even secretly converted to Roman Catholicism. Gugsa Welle wrote letters to the leaders of Tigre and Gojjam seeking support for his revolt. He wrote to Ras Seyum Mangasha and Ras Gugsa Araya Selassie of Tigre and to Ras Hailu Tekle Haymanot of Gojjam. All three initially appeared supportive. But, after reconsideration, none responded to the letters from Gugsa Welle and all three provincial leaders failed to join him. On the other hand, the rebelling Oromo did agree to join forces.

== Battle ==
Negus Tafari Makonnen called a chitet, the traditional mustering of the provincial levies. (Note: A chitet is the traditional mustering of the provincial levies.) Ostensibly he was raising an army to finally crush the ongoing revolt in Wollo. At the time, Ras Gugsa Welle was not in open revolt and Empress Zewditu was still pleading with him not to go into open revolt. In the end, as part of the government, the Empress was in the strange position of being formally on the same side as King Tafari and being against her husband who was rebelling on her behalf.

The response to the chitet, like the initial call to suppress the revolt in Wollo, was less than enthusiastic initially. The newly appointed Minister of War, Ras Mulugeta Yeggazu, was only able to raise the Mahel Sefari (Note: Equivalent to Central Army.) with 16,000 men pledged to it. Worse, by January 1930, Mulugeta Yeggazu found himself with only 2,000 men as he gathered in Dessie. Worse yet, Gugsa Welle was now in open revolt and he had already gathered an army in Debre Tabor of 35,000 utterly devoted men. He was able to do this even without the forces from Tigre and Gojjam.

On 24 February, Empress Zewditu and King Tafari issued the Imperial Proclamation of Yekatit. (Note: Yekatit roughly equivalent to February.) The proclamation declared that Ras Gugsa Welle was a rebel. Attached to the proclamation was an anathema signed by the Coptic Abuna Kyrilos and by five new bishops, Sauiros, Abraham, Petros, Mikael, and Isaac. The anathema was addressed to all monasteries of Begemder. It concluded "And therefore, you may follow Ras Gugsa Welle, you may attach yourself to him, be cursed and excommunicated; your life and your flesh are outcasts from Christian society." The devotion of many of the men following Ras Gugsa Welle was shaken by the proclamation and its attached anathema.

In mid-March, Ras Mulugeta marched the Mahel Sefari from Dessie to Debre Tabor to face the rebellious Gugsa Welle. With him were five cannon, seven machine guns, and something entirely new for Ethiopian warfare: aircraft.

=== Psychological warfare ===
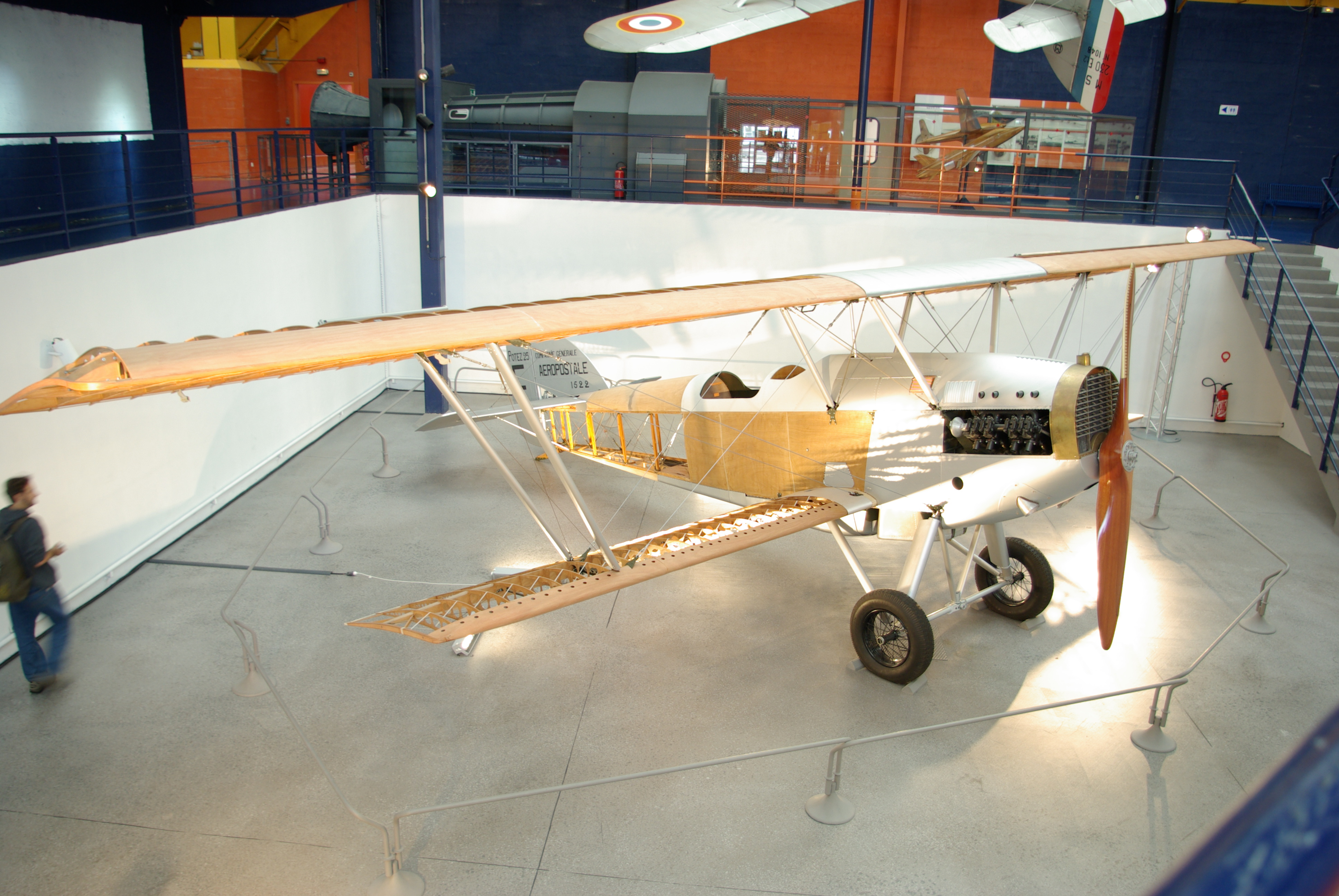
Potez 25 biplane typical of aircraft available during the beginnings of the Ethiopian Air Force.

On 28 March 1930, when Gugsa Welle's army crossed the border of Begemder Province moving towards Shewa Province, it was met with an unusual sight. Three Ethiopian government biplanes flew overhead. (Note: While Mockler indicates three Ethiopian government biplanes flew overhead, Marcus indicates one biplane made three passes. Like Mockler, Omissi indicates that it was three biplanes and further indicates that they dropped proclamations, hand grenades, and bombs.) In 1922, Ras Tafari Makonnen had first shown interest in military aircraft and, by 1929, a small Ethiopian air arm was under development and was now used for the first time.

The biplanes dropped numerous copies of two specially created leaflets onto the advancing army. One leaflet bore a message from the newly arrived Abuna Kyrilos. The message from Kyrilos was that anyone who fought against the government forces would be excommunicated. A second leaflet was from King Tafari and Empress Zewditu and it declared Gugsa Welle to be a rebel. In an example of "psychological warfare", the leaflets appealed to the known conservative and religious sympathies of the forces fighting for Gugsa Welle. Some of his army started to desert him.

=== Biplanes and the Plains of Anchem ===
On 31 March, both armies met at Debre Zebit on the plains of Anchem. At 9:00 am, the biplanes once again appeared. But this time bombs and not leaflets were dropped upon Gugsa Welle's army. At this point in Ethiopian history, aerial warfare was still quite novel, unprecedented, and totally unexpected. More of his army deserted Gugsa Welle. (Note: According to Marcus, the army of Gugsa Welle numbered 10,000 at this time and generally deserted him after being bombed from the air.)

The Imperial Army arrayed against Gugsa Welle included Fitawrari (Note: Equivalent to Commander of the Advanced Guard.) Wondosson Kassa in the center, Qegnazmach (Note: Equivalent to Commander of the Right.) Ayalew Birru on the right, and Fitawrari Fikremariam on the left. Fitawrari Wondosson Kassa was the eldest son of Ras Kassa Haile Darge, Qegnazmach Ayalew Birru commanded the troops from Semien, and Fitawrari Fikremariam commanded the troops from Wollo. In reserve were forces under Ras Mulugeta Yeggazu and Dejazmach Adafrisau Yenado.

According to Time magazine, by the time of battle, the two opposing armies were a mismatch. Gugsa Welle and his Army of Begemder numbered approximately 10,000 men and were armed with ten machine guns and two cannons. Opposing them was a much better equipped army of approximately 20,000 men loyal to the central government.

Battle began and, after four hours, the Imperial forces under Fitawrari Wondosson Kassa and Qegnazmach Ayalew Birru gained the upper hand. With the tide turning, Ras Gugsa Welle's shaken army started to desert him in large numbers.

=== Coup de grâce ===
Shortly after mid-day, Ras Gugsa Welle was surrounded and isolated. It was at this time that the coup de grâce was delivered. Gugsa Welle was called upon to surrender. Mounted on a white charger, he chose to fight on, was shot several times, and was killed. Fitawrari Shumye, the second-in-command of the Army of Begemder, fought on until he was captured later in the afternoon. What little was left of the army then completely disintegrated. Gugsa Welle's Oromo allies never showed up during the battle. Instead, they arrived a day later.

Dejazmach Birru Wolde Gabriel and the army of Sidamo Province entered Debra Tabor unopposed. With the death of Gugsa Welle and the destruction of his army, the rebellion was ended.

== Aftermath ==
Gondar, the capital of Begemder Province, was taken without resistance soon after the Battle of Anchem ended. Fitawrari Wondosson Kassa benefitted because his father, a loyal ally of Negus Tafari, was given all of the lands formerly controlled by Gugsa Welle. As a result, Wondosson Kassa was made the Shum of Begemder Province. Within three days of the death of Gugsa Welle, Empress Zewditu was dead of natural causes.

On 2 November 1930, about eight months after the passing of Zewditu, Negus Tafari Makonnen was proclaimed Emperor (Nəgusä Nägäst) (Note: Literally "King of Kings", equivalent to Emperor.) Haile Selassie I of Ethiopia.

== See also ==
- Monarchies of Ethiopia
- Ethiopian aristocratic and court titles
- Balcha Safo
- Ethiopian coup d'état of 1928

== Footnotes and citations ==
Footnotes

Citations
