= Gugsa Wale's rebellion =

1929–1930 rebellion between Gugsa Wale and Haile Selassie

- Part of the Opposition to Haile Selassie
Date	September 1929 – March 1930
Location	Begemder, Ethiopian Empire
Result	Gugsa Wale defeated and Negus Tafari Makonnen proclaimed as Emperor Haile Selassie

Belligerents
Pro-Empress Zewditu faction Yejju (arrived late)	Pro-Negus Tafari Makonnen faction

Commanders and leaders
Gugsa Wale †	Negus Tafari; Empress Zewditu; Mulugeta Yeggazu

Strength
Approx. 35,000	Approx. 32,000

Gugsa Wale's rebellion was a rebellion raised by Ras (Note: Roughly equivalent to Duke.) Gugsa Wale and by supporters of Empress (Note: Nigiste Negest, roughly equivalent to Queen of Kings or Empress Regnant.) Zewditu to rid her of the Crown Prince and heir apparent, Negus (Note: Roughly equivalent to King.) Tafari Makonnen. (Note: Inderase, equivalent to Regent.) With Tafari gone, Zewditu would be the sole claimant to succession as the ruler of the Ethiopian Empire (Mangista Ityop'p'ya). As the husband of Empress Zewditu, Gugsa Wale expected to become Emperor.

== Details ==
In 1916, when Zewditu was crowned Empress, she was forced to separate from her fourth husband, Ras Gugsa Wale. Empress Zewditu was named Regent during the minority of Ras Tafari Makonnen, the heir apparent and Regent Plenipotentiary. As Regent, Zewditu exercised the real power in Ethiopia. Zewditu would govern while Tafari would administer.

Early in 1928, the authority of Ras Tafari Makonnen was challenged when Dejazmach (Note: Equivalent to Commander of the Gate.) Balcha Safo went to Addis Ababa with a sizeable armed force.

When Tafari consolidated his hold over the provinces, many of Menilek's appointees refused to abide by the new regulations he imposed. Balcha Safo, Shum (Note: Roughly equivalent to Governor.) of coffee-rich Sidamo Province was particularly troublesome in his refusal to comply. The revenues he remitted to the central government did not reflect the accrued profits and, as a result, Tafari recalled him to Addis Ababa. The old man came in high dudgeon and, insultingly, with a large army. When he arrived in Addis Ababa, the Dejazmach paid homage to Empress Zewditu, but snubbed Ras Tafari. On 18 February, while Balcha Safo and his personal bodyguard were in Addis Ababa, Ras Tafari had Ras Kassa Haile Darge buy off his army and arrange to have him displaced as the Shum of Sidamo Province. Powerless, Balcha Safo surrendered and was imprisoned.

In September 1928, a group of palace reactionaries including some of the courtiers of the Empress, made a final bid to get rid of Tafari. The attempted coup d'état was tragic in its origins and comic in its end. When confronted by Tafari and a company of his troops, the ringleaders of the coup took refuge on the palace grounds in Menilek's mausoleum. Tafari and his men surrounded them only to be surrounded themselves by the personal guard of Zewditu. More of Tafari's khaki clad soldiers arrived and, with superiority of arms, decided the outcome in his favor.

=== Background of unhappiness with Ras Tafari ===
On 27 October 1928, thirty-two-year-old Ras Tafari Makonnen, the future Emperor Haile Selassie I, was crowned Negus. He was crowned by Empress Zewditu. The crowning of Tafari as Negus caused him to begin exercising power at the expense of Zewditu. His crowning also caused two factions to develop within the royal court: One faction was pro-Tafari and one faction was pro-Zewditu. The husband of Zewditu, fifty-three-year-old Ras Gugsa Wale, imagined a future where Zewditu remained Empress and he himself would be proclaimed Emperor. He was clearly the leader of the pro-Zewditu faction.

Within a month of Tefari being crowned Negus, the Raya Oromo revolted in Wollo Province. As Negus and with the tacit approval of the Empress, Tafari called for the governors of several neighboring provinces to suppress the Oromo revolt. Ras Seyum Mangasha from Axum in western Tigre, Ras Gugsa Araya Selassie from Mekelle in eastern Tigre, Dejaz (Note: Dejaz is the shorter form of the title Dejazmach) Ayalew Birru from Semien, and Ras Gugsa Wale from Begemder were called upon. Gugsa Wale and others were unhappy with the rise of Negus Tafari. As a result, the response to Tafari's call was less than enthusiastic, efforts to suppress the Oromo were dissipated in palace intrigue, and the revolt continued. Gugsa Wale balked when he was called to Dessie by Tafari because he did not want to be made the scapegoat for the revolt. Ultimately a trusted cousin of Tafari, Ras Imru Haile Selassie, was made Shum (Note: Roughly equivalent to Governor.) of Wollo in an effort to end the revolt.

In addition to not being happy with the rise of Tafari, Gugsa Wale tried to rally "traditional Ethiopia" to his side in support of his wife, the Empress. In the opinion of this faction, Tafari was too young, too modern, and it was rumored that he had even secretly converted to Roman Catholicism. Gugsa Wale wrote letters to the leaders of Tigre and Gojjam seeking support for his revolt. He wrote to Ras Seyum Mangasha and Ras Gugsa Araya Selassie of Tigre and to Ras Hailu Tekle Haymanot of Gojjam. All three initially appeared supportive. But, after reconsideration, none responded to the letters from Gugsa Wale and all three failed to join him. On the other hand, the Oromo did agree to join forces.

Tafari Makonnen called a chitet, the traditional mustering of the provincial levies. Ostensibly he was raising an army to finally crush the ongoing revolt in Wollo. At the time, Gugsa Wale was not in open revolt and Empress Zewditu was still pleading with him not to go into open revolt. In the end, as part of the government, the Empress was in the strange position of being formally on the same side as King Tafari and being against her husband who was rebelling on her behalf.

=== Open revolt ===
The response to the chitet, like the initial call to suppress the revolt in Wollo, was less than enthusiastic. The newly appointed Minister of War, Ras Mulugeta Yeggazu, was only able to raise an Army of the Center (Mahel Sefari) with 16,000 men pledged to it. Worse, by January 1930, Mulugeta Yeggazu found himself with only 2,000 men as he gathered in Dessie. Even worse, Gugsa Wale was now in open revolt and he had already gathered an army in Debre Tabor of 35,000 utterly devoted men.

In mid-March, Ras Mulugeta marched the Mahel Sefari to Debre Tabor to face the rebellious Gugsa Wale. With him were five cannon, seven machine guns, and something entirely new for Ethiopian warfare: Aircraft.

=== Battle of Anchem ===
On 31 March, Gugsa Wale and his army met the Mahel Sefari at Debre Zebit on the plains of Anchem. The use of aerial warfare, psychological warfare, and superior armaments by the Mahel Sefari meant that the Battle of Anchem was almost over before it was fought. Shortly after mid-day, Gugsa Wale was surrounded and isolated. Mounted on a white charger, Gugsa Wale was shot several times and killed. Fitawrari Shumye, the second-in-command of the Army of Begemder, fought on until he was captured later in the afternoon. What little was left of the army then completely disintegrated. With his death and with the destruction of his army, Gugsa Wale's rebellion was over.

=== Aftermath ===
Within three days of the death of Ras Gugsa Wale, Empress Zewditu was dead of natural causes. (Note: It has been implied that the Empress was poisoned.) On 2 November 1930, about eight months after the passing of Zewditu, Negus Tafari Makonnen was proclaimed Emperor (Nəgusä Nägäst) (Note: Equivalent to King of Kings.) Haile Selassie I of Ethiopia.

Nəgusä Nägäst Haile Selassie was of the opinion that the Italians were behind Ras Gugsa's rebellion. In his autobiography, he claimed Italy was engaged in propaganda activities with the object of dividing the Ethiopian Empire. According to Haile Selassie, Ras Gugsa Wale of Begemder and Ras Hailu Tekle Haymanot of Goggam connived to carry out the work of deceit and propaganda with the Italians.

== See also ==
- 1928 Ethiopian coup attempt

== Footnotes and citations ==
Footnotes

Citations
