= Second Italo-Ethiopian War order of battle: Ethiopia =

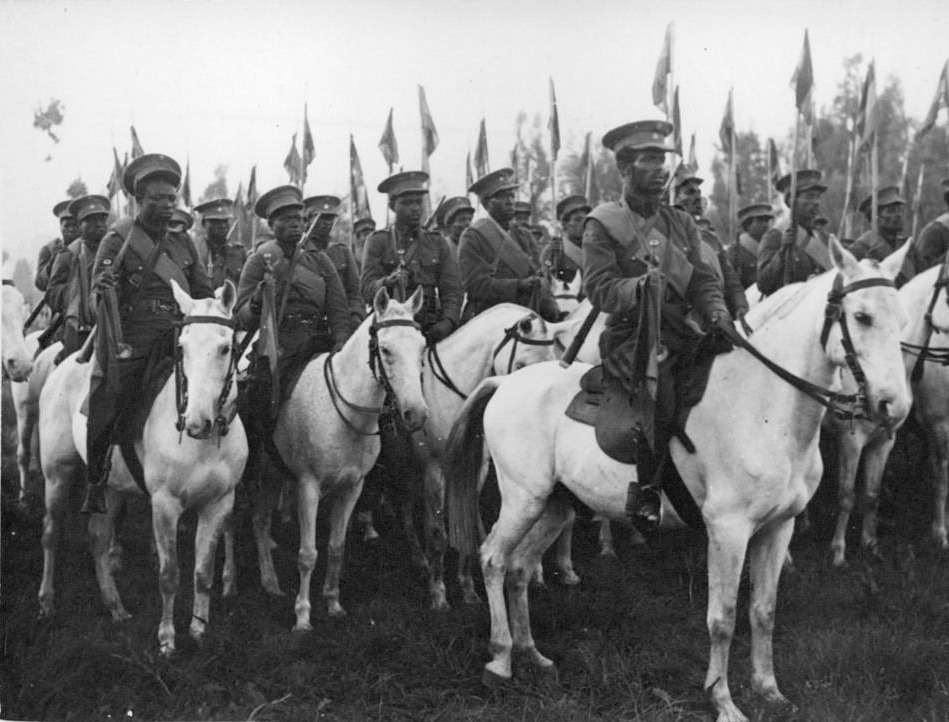
Abyssinian soldiers, 1936.

Ethiopian forces in the Second Italo-Abyssinian War besides the Central Army were mobilized from various provinces under their local leader. According to 1935 Italian intelligence estimates of the Ethiopian provinces and their forces on the eve of hostilities, the Ethiopians had an army of 350,000 men. Strengths where known are noted followed by their leader. Modernized forces in Bold.

== Ethiopian Army 1935 ==
Addis Ababa

- Emperor Haile Selassie
  - 3 Battalions of the Imperial Guard Kebur Zabangna
  - **Cadet school** (Mobilized as a Guard battalion late in the war with Cadets as officers with militia soldiers.)

=== Northern front ===
Army of the Left - Ras Imru Haile Selassie (Grazmach = "General/Commander of the Left")

- **Gojjam Provincial Armed Forces (Sefari)** - Ras Imru Haile Selassie
  - **13,000 regulars**
- Wolqayt and Semien Sefari - Fitawrari Ayalew Birru
  - 10,000 mountaineers
- Gojjam Levies - Dejazmach Gessesse Belew (later deserted, revolted)
  - 12,000 men

Mahel Sefari (Army of the Center) (70,000 regulars) - Ras Mulugeta Yeggazu of Illubabor

- Amino Provincial Sefari
- Gubba Provincial Sefari
- Gurage Provincial Sefari
- Jimma Provincial Sefari
- Mui Provincial Sefari
- Om Hajer Provincial Sefari
- Sela Provincial Sefari
- Sodo Provincial Sefari
- Welega Provincial Sefari

Army of the Right- Ras Kassa Haile Darge (Qegnazmach = "General/Commander of the right")

- Begemder Sefari - Ras Kassa Haile Darge/Shum Wondosson Kassa
  - 53,000 men
- Tigray Sefari - Leul Ras Seyum Mangasha
  - 15,000 men
- Wag Sefari - Dejazmatch Haile Kebbede
  - 7,000 men (1/6 with rifles)
  - 3,000 **regulars** with 3 machineguns, reinforcement 12/35
- Lasta Sefari - Fitawrari Andarge
  - ? men
- Yejju Sefari - Dejazmach Admassu Birru
  - ? men

Danakil region - Dejazmach Kassa Sebhat

- 400 trained men
- **100 regulars**
- 5 machineguns

Later Reinforcements

Ifrata Sefari - Ras Kebbede

- ? Shewan levies

Welega-Ardjo Sefari - Bitwoded Makonnen Demissie

- 12,000 men (best armed of the Northern armies, also had Oerlikon AA guns)

Kaffa Sefari - Ras Getachew Abate

- ? men

To subdue Gojjam revolt

Wollo Sefari - Crown Prince Asfaw Wossen Tafari

- from Wollo - Nevraid Aregai
  - 1,000 men
- from Lekemt - Dejazmach Hapte Gabre Mariam Gabre
  - 1,000 men

=== Southern front ===
Ogaden

Ogaden Sefari - Grazmach Afawarq Walda Samayat

- less than 2,000 men - Fitawrari Badde / Balambaras Ali Nur
- Some hundreds of Somali rebels - Omar Samanthar
- 2 **Guard Battalions** - Fitawrari Simu and Kebbede
  - 1,000 men with machineguns and mortars
  - 9,000 walwal & warder. fitawrari Walde Amanuel.
- Total 12000 men.

Reinforcements

Hararghe Sefari - Dejazmach Nasibu Emmanual - C-in-C in Ogaden after Afewerq's death

- 1 **Guard Battalion**
- Illubabor Sefari - Dejazmach Makonnen Endelkachew
  - 12,000 men
- Gemu Gofa Sefari - Dejazmach Abebe Damtew
  - 3,000 men (described as having scarcely a modern rifle, with ocher and pink headdresses)
- Arusi Sefari - Dejazmach Amde Mikael
  - 3,000 men (provincial levies)
- Kula Sefari - Dejazmach Hapte Mikael
  - 1,000 men

Webi Shebelle front

- **Bale Sefari** - Dejazmach Beine Merid
  - 4,000 men

Juba Front

- Dolo Garrison - 300 men
- **Sidamo Sefari** - Ras Desta Damtew
  - 20,000 men (well armed) - Fitawraris Ademe Anbassu and Tedeamme Zelleka
  - **Guards Battalion** - Qegnazmach Bezibibeh Sileshi
  - Oerlikon AA guns

== See also ==
- Army of the Ethiopian Empire
- List of Second Italo-Ethiopian War weapons of Ethiopia
- Italian order of battle for the Second Italo-Ethiopian War

== Sources ==
- Barker, A. J. (1968). The Civilising Mission: The Italo-Ethiopian War 1935–6. London: Cassell. ISBN 978-0-304-93201-6.
- Mockler, Anthony (2003). Haile Selassie's War. New York: Olive Branch Press. ISBN 978-1-56656-473-1.
- Nicolle, David (1997). The Italian Invasion of Abyssinia 1935–1936. Men-at-Arms. London: Osprey. ISBN 978-1-85532-692-7.
