= Abba Samuel Wolde Kahin =

Tutor and mentor of Ras Tafari Makonnen

Abba Samuel Wolde Kahin (also spelled Walda Kahen; Amharic: አባ ሳሙኤል ወልደ ካህን) was the tutor and mentor of Ras Tafari Makonnen (later Emperor Haile Selassie I) and his cousin, Ras Imru Haile Selassie, when the two were children living at Harar, ca. 1902–1912.

In Chapter 1 of his autobiography, My Life and Ethiopia's Progress, Haile Selassie recalls how his father Ras Makonnen Woldemikael first arranged for Dr. Vitalien, a physician from Guadeloupe, to instruct the boys in French an hour or so a day. Not considering this sufficient, he also hired Abba Samuel, an Ethiopian at the French Capuchin Mission in Harar. Samuel's father, Alaqa Wolde Kahin, had earlier converted to Roman Catholicism.

According to historian H.G. Marcus, this association had caused some suspicion among the nobles that Ras Tafari was leaning toward Catholicism himself, which suspicion he allayed by undergoing a rare second Ethiopian Orthodox rite of baptism in 1906.

As remembered by the future Emperor in his autobiography,

Abba Samuel was a good man who possessed great knowledge, who applied himself to learning and to teaching, who in goodness and humility gathered knowledge like a bee from anyone, who was devoted to the love of God and of his neighbour, and who did not strive to find enjoyment of the flesh but of the soul. I am saying this because I had known him very well while we were together some ten years.

Later in Chapter 5 of his autobiography, the Emperor relates that Abba Samuel was one of the seven men who drowned in a boating accident on Lake Alemaya on 7 June 1915.
