= Debre Zebit =

- Location in Ethiopia
- Coordinates: 11°49′N 38°35′E
- Country: Ethiopia
- Region: Amhara Region
- Zone: Semien Wollo Zone
- Elevation: 2,928 m (9,606 ft)
- Time zone: UTC+3 (EAT)

Debre Zebit (Amharic: ደብረ ዘቢጥ) is a village in northern Ethiopia. Located in the Semien Wollo Zone of the Amhara Region, about 240 kilometres north of Addis Ababa, this village has a latitude and longitude of 11°49′N 38°35′E and an elevation of 2928 meters above sea level. The Central Statistical Agency has not published an estimate for this village's 2005 population. It is one of three towns in Meket woreda.

== History ==
=== 20th Century ===
Debre Zebit was the location of the Battle of Anchem, on 31 March 1930 between (then) Ras Tafari's forces under the command of Dejazmach Mulugeta Yeggazu (which consisted of 20,000 riflemen with 6 cannons and about 30 machine guns) over those of Ras Gugsa Welle (consisting of 10,000 riflemen with 2 cannons and about 10 machine guns). Ras Gugsa was defeated and killed.

=== 21st Century ===
==== Tigray War ====
During the Tigray War, around 15 August 2021, the Tigray Defense Forces were in control of the town for some days.
