= Adafersaw Yenadu =

Army commander

Adefrsew Yenadu (1873–1950) (Note: Different parts of Haile Selassie's autobiography indicate that Adefrsew Yenadu died in either 1950 or 1960.) was an army commander, a member of the nobility of the Ethiopian Empire, and a patriot.

== Biography ==
Adefrsew Yenadu was the son of Ras (Note: Roughly equivalent to Duke.) Yenadu. He was a young favorite of Emperor Menelik II. In 1896, during the First Italo-Ethiopian War, Adefrsew Yenadu fought bravely at the Battle of Adwa.

In 1930, Dejazmach (Note: Equivalent to Commander of the Gate.) Adefrsew Yenadu was appointed head of the Imperial Guard (Kebur Zabangna) by Emperor Haile Selassie I. On 31 March, during Gugsa Welle's Rebellion, he was at the Battle of Anchem as part of the Imperial Army. His forces were part of the reserves.

In 1935, at the beginning the Second Italo-Ethiopian War, Adefrsew Yenadu was with Emperor Haile Selassie. In March 1936, at the Battle of Maychew he commanded the palace guard and reported directly to the emperor. He remained with Haile Selassie to the end of the conflict and, in May, joined him in exile. Adefrsew Yenadu stayed in Jerusalem in the British Mandate of Palestine.

In 1940, during World War II, Adefrsew Yenadu was in the Sudan at the beginning of the East African Campaign. He was entrusted with the task of negotiating political arrangements with the Arbegnoch (Note: Equivalent to Ethiopian Patriots.) and continued to do so throughout the campaign. In early 1941, when Haile Selassie crossed into Ethiopia, Adefrsew Yenadu was with him.

In 1942, having successfully served his Emperor, Adefrsew Yenadu was made Shum (Note: Roughly equivalent to Governor.) of Sidamo Province and elevated to Ras. In 1948, he was appointed as a crown councillor and a senator.

== See also ==
- Ethiopian aristocratic and court titles

== Footnotes and citations ==
Footnotes

Citations
