= Getachew =

Getachew (Amharic: ጌታቸው) is a male given name of Ethiopian origin that may refer to:

- Getachew Reda (born 1974), Ethiopian politician and member of the executive committee of the TPLF
- Getachew Abate (1895–1952), Ethiopian army commander and nobleman
- Helen Getachew (born 1990), Ethiopian beauty pageant contestant
- Getatchew Mekurya (1935–2016), Ethiopian jazz saxophonist
- Getachew Kassa (1944–2024), Ethiopian singer and percussionist
