= Renzo Dalmazzo =

Italian lieutenant general during World War II

General Renzo Dalmazzo
- Born: 23 January 1886; Turin, Kingdom of Italy
- Died: 12 December 1959 (aged 73); Turin, Italy
- Military career
- Allegiance: Kingdom of Italy
- Rank: Lieutenant General
- Nickname: Renzo
- Commands: Italian 2nd Eritrean Division; 2nd Cavalry Division "Emanuele Filiberto Testa di Ferro"; 21st Army Corps; 6th Army Corps; 9th Army
- Awards: Military Order of Italy

Lorenzo "Renzo" Dalmazzo (January 23, 1886 – December 12, 1959) was an Italian lieutenant general and corps and army commander during World War II.

== Military career ==
On 3 June 1918, he received the Knight's Military Order of Italy (5th Class).

He served in the colony of Italian Somaliland in 1925–1926 and in Italian East Africa in 1936, where he led the Italian 2nd Eritrean Division during the Second Italo-Ethiopian War. On 24 May 1937, he received the Officer's Military Order of Italy (4th Class). He returned to Italy and became commander of the 2nd Cavalry Division "Emanuele Filiberto Testa di Ferro".

After the outbreak of World War II he commanded the XXI Corps in the Western Desert Campaign in 1939–1940. He commanded the VI Corps in occupied Yugoslavia in 1940–1942, where he was instrumental in negotiating collaboration agreements with the Chetniks. On 24 December 1942, he received the Commander's Military Order of Italy (3rd Class).

He then served in Albania in 1943 as commander of the 9th Army. In March 1943 he negotiated an agreement with Ali Këlcyra of the Balli Kombëtar for their assistance in suppressing the communist resistance. The Dalmazzo–Këlcyra Agreement has been controversial in Albanian historiography. He was taken prisoner of war by the Germans in 1943 when Italy capitulated to the Allies. He died in 1959.
