= Gugsa Welle =

Ethiopian army commander (1875–1930)

Ras Gugsa Welle
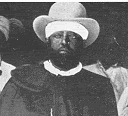

Shum of Begemder
- Monarchs: Menelik II; Zewditu I

Shum of Semien
- Monarch: Zewditu I

Personal details
- Born: 1875 Begemder, Ethiopian Empire
- Died: 21 March 1930 (aged 54–55) Debre Zebit, Ethiopian Empire
- Spouse: Zewditu I

Military service
- Allegiance: Ethiopian Empire
- Years of service: 1890s–1930
- Battles/wars: First Italo-Ethiopian War; Battle of Segale; Gugsa Wale's rebellion; Battle of Anchem †

Gugsa Welle (1875 – 31 March 1930; as spelled as Gugsa Wale or Gugsa Wolie, and cited as Ras Gugsà Oliè in Italian books and encyclopedias), was an Ethiopian army commander and a member of the imperial family of the Ethiopian Empire. He represented a provincial ruling elite which was often at odds with the Ethiopian central government.

== Biography ==
Gugsa was born in Marto in Yejju Province. He was the son of Ras Welle Betul and the nephew of Empress Taytu Betul. His half-sister, Kefey Wale, was the second wife of Ras Mangesha Yohannes, the natural son of Emperor Yohannes IV. Prouty quotes Bairu Tafla's favorable opinion of Gugsa as "One of the most enlightened men of the Ethiopian nobility, a renowned poet, great lover of books, and pious and fair in the administration of Begemder."

Taytu Betul arranged the marriage of Gugsa Welle to Leult (Note: Roughly equivalent to Princess.) Zewditu, the eldest daughter of Emperor Menelek II and an earlier wife. They were married in 1900, sixteen years before her elevation to Empress. Gugsa was her fourth husband. With his marriage to Zewditu, Gugsa was immediately promoted to Ras over Begemder Province. Prouty indicates that this alliance allowed Empress Taytu to extend her influence over this important province. Despite the political nature of this marriage, the two were happy. However, in 1909, Gugsa was summoned to Addis Ababa by Menelik II to respond to the charge that he had mistreated Zewditu.

Gugsa came close to becoming the power behind the throne during the intrigue that characterized the years of Emperor Menelik II's senility, for in 1909, the Empress Taytu made a serious effort to prevent the accession of Lij Iyasu as Menelik's successor. This led to the rumor that Empress Taytu and her brother, Ras Wale Betul, intended to move the capital to Gondar and make Welle the Emperor. However, the Shewan aristocracy agreed that their authority, positions and honors depended on obeying Menelik's wishes, and they united behind Lij Iyasu as the successor. Despite this setback, Gugsa initially supported the resulting status quo: when Dejazmach Abraha Araya rebelled in Tigray, Gugsa supported Dejazmach Abate Bwalu who was sent to suppress this threat, helping him to defeat Dejazmach Abraha in the Battle of Lake Ashenge on 9 October.

However, once Iyasu was secure as Emperor the following year, Ras Gugsa was arrested "on a murder charge so patently false that he ultimately regained his freedom." By late April, he was in chains in Addis Ababa and "no longer a potential threat to the government". This confinement proved to be cruel. According to Prouty, Gugsa "was kept in chains for so long that his legs became swollen and the metal cut into his flesh". Zewditu begged Iyasu's short-lived Regent, Ras Tessema Nadew, to ease conditions for Gugsa. But it was not until 1915, when she was relegated to Falle, that Gugsa was released and the two were allowed to live together.

In 1916, a successful coup d'état against Iyasu resulted in his being deposed and Zewditu being proclaimed Empress. Iyasu's father, Mikael of Wollo, then invaded Shewa Province with an army to restore Iyasu. Mikael was defeated in the Battle of Segale. With Iyasu deposed, Zewditu became "Queen of Kings" and Empress of Ethiopia, and her young cousin Tafari Makonnen became heir to the throne and Regent of the Empire.

Empress Zewditu and Gugsa were restored to good graces. But the Shewan leadership, leery of a resurgence of the influence of Dowager Empress Taitu and her family, forced Gugsa to separate from Zewditu and he was sent to Gondar where he served once again as Governor of Begemder. Gugsa also served as Governor of Semien at this time.

The crowning of Tafari Makonnen was controversial. He occupied the same territory as Zewditu rather than occupying a far off region in the empire. In Ethiopian history two monarchs, even with one being the vassal and the other the Emperor (in this case Empress), had never occupied the same location as their seat. Conservatives, including Balcha Safo, agitated to redress this perceived insult to the Empress and to the dignity of the crown. This state of agitation ultimately led to Ras Gugsa's rebellion in 1930. Gugsa saw Zewditu remaining as Empress and himself as the future Emperor. However, Empress Zewditu did not authorize or openly support his rebellious actions.

In January, Gugsa raised an army in Begemder. On 28 March, he marched from his governorate at Gondar towards the capital, but, on 31 March, he was met near the border by the Army of the Center (Mahel Sefari) and he was defeated and killed at the Battle of Anchem. News of his defeat and death had hardly spread through Addis Ababa when the Empress died suddenly on 2 April. Although it was long rumored that the Empress was poisoned on the defeat of her husband, or alternatively that she died from shock upon hearing of his death, it has since been documented that the Empress succumbed to a flu-like fever (possibly typhoid) and complications from diabetes.

== See also ==
- Hailu Tekle Haymanot
- Balcha Safo
- Ethiopian coup d'état of 1928

== Notes ==
Footnotes

Citations
