= Italian 2nd Eritrean Division =

1935 Italian Infantry division

The Italian 2nd Eritrean Division, also known as the Second Eritrean Division or II Division Indigeni (Native), was an Italian Infantry division used in the Second Italo-Abyssinian War in 1935. It was formed from the Eritrean Ascari of the Battalion indigeni (Native Battalions) who provided the regular colonial forces of Italian Eritrea.

During the Battle of Maychew the Division took heavy losses against attacks from the elite Ethiopian Imperial Guard.
The Division was dissolved in 1936 after the hostilities had ended.

== Organization ==
2nd Natives Division - Gen. Achille Vaccarisi

- 2nd Mixed Brigade - Brig. Gen. Lorenzo Dalmazzo

- 3rd Native Battalion Group

- V "Ameglio" Native Battalion
- XXI "Fulmine" Native Battalion

- 7th Native Battalion Group

- IV "Toselli" Native Battalion
- XIX "Cafaro" Native Battalion
- XXII Native Battalion

- 2nd Mountain Artillery Battalion (65/17 mod. 13 mountain guns)

- 4th Mixed Brigade - Brig. Gen. Gustavo Pesenti

- 4th Native Battalion Group

- IX "Guastoni" Native Battalion
- XII Native Battalion
- XVII "Nebri" Native Battalion

- 8th Native Battalion Group

- VIII "Gamerra" Native Battalion
- XX Native Battalion

- 4th Mountain Artillery Battalion (65/17 mod. 13 mountain guns)

Note:

- the X and XXV native battalions were detached from the Division

== Commanders ==
- gen. Achille Vaccarisi (1935.05.01 – 1936.01.24)
- gen. Lorenzo Dalmazzo (1936.01.24 – 1936.04.26)
