= Getachew Abate =

Ethiopian army commander (1895–1952)

Minister to France
- In office 1929–1930

Minister of the Interior
- In office 1931–1933

Ethiopian representative to the League of Nations
- In office 1928–1929

Personal details
- Born: 1895
- Died: 1952
- Education: Menelik School (École Impériale Menelik II)
- Occupation: Army commander, nobleman

Military service
- Allegiance: Ethiopian Empire
- Branch/service: Ethiopian Army
- Rank: Ras
- Commands: Army of Kaffa
- Battles/wars: Second Italo-Ethiopian War

Getachew Abate (1895–1952) was an army commander and a member of the nobility of the Ethiopian Empire.

Getachew Abate was the son of Lique Mekwas (Note: Roughly equivalent to the Emperor's Second.) Abate Ba-Yalew. He had a church education followed by language training at the Menelik School (Ecole Imperiale Menelik II). Getachew Abate grew up in the palace of Emperor Menelik II along with Menelik's grandson, Lij Iyasu.

In 1919, Dejazmach (Note: Equivalent to Commander of the Gate.) Getachew Abate was sent to Italy to congratulate King Victor Emmanuel on an Allied victory. In 1921, he was part of the force sent to capture the deposed Lij Iyasu. In 1925, Getachew Abate represented Ethiopia at the Geneva arms conference.

In 1926, Getachew Abate was named Shum (Note: Roughly equivalent to Governor.) of Kaffa, Goldiya, Maji, and Gera with the title of Bitwoded. (Note: Roughly equivalent to Beloved.) In 1928, he was named Ethiopia's representative to the League of Nations. In 1929, Getachew Abate was appointed as Minister to France.

In 1930, Getachew Abate returned to Ethiopia and, in 1931, he became the Minister of the Interior. In May 1933, Getachew Abate was elevated to Ras. (Note: Roughly equivalent to Duke.)

In 1935, at the time of the Italian invasion, as the Shum of Kaffa Province, Ras Getachew Abate commanded the Army of Kaffa. On 31 March 1936, Ras Getachew Abate and the Army of Kaffa was with Emperor Haile Selassie at the Battle of Maychew. When the Kebur Zabagna (the Ethiopian imperial guard) was sent against the Italians at Maychew, Getachew Abate commanded them. As the Battle of Maychew came to an end, Getachew Abate was named by the Emperor as Asmach. (Note: Equivalent to Commander of the Rear Guard.) In command of the rear guard, he withdrew with the Emperor from Maychew to the Ethiopian capital, Addis Ababa.

As the Italians closed in on Addis Ababa, he went into exile with Haile Selassie. Getachew Abate departed from the royal party as it traveled through the British Mandate of Palestine. Getachew Abate then spent some time in Jerusalem. But ultimately he returned to occupied Ethiopia and submitted to the Italians.

In 1941, after the Italians were driven out of Ethiopia, Ras Getachew Abate was arrested by the liberators. In an act of clemency it was reported that Haile Selassie told him "I pardon you, but I don't know if God will." Afterwards, Getachew Abate was exiled to remote parts of the Empire, Jimma and Arsi. He is said to have died of alcohol poisoning.

== See also ==
- Ethiopian aristocratic and court titles

== Notes ==
Footnotes

Citations
