= Second Italo-Ethiopian War order of battle: Italy =

The Italian order of battle for the Second Italo-Ethiopian War on 8 October 1935. The Ethiopian order of battle is listed separately.

== Comando Supremo Africa Orientale ==
Commander: General Emilio De Bono to November 1935, Field Marshal Pietro Badoglio November 1935 – June 1936

- 7th Artillery Group (77/28 field guns)
- Granatieri di Sardegna Battalion (coming from Italy)
- Alpini Battalion (coming from Italy)
- Guardia di Finanza Battalion (coming from Italy)
- 3 Assault Battalions (still in Italy)
- 7th Artillery Group (Obice da 149/13 howitzer) (coming from Italy)
- Engineer Unit Comando Supremo Africa Orientale
- Bombardment, Reconnaissance, and Fighter Aviation Command A. O. – Gen. Mario Ajmone Cat
  - 3rd Air Brigade – Brig.Gen. Ferruccio Ranza Eritrea (145 aircraft)
    - HQ Flight (4 × Caproni Ca.101 light bomber/transport aircraft)
    - Reconnaissance Squadron (un-numbered):
      - 34th Reconnaissance Flight (8 × Romeo Ro.1 reconnaissance and ground attack aircraft) attached to Eritrean Corps
      - 38th Reconnaissance Flight (10 × Ro.1)
      - 41st Reconnaissance Flight (10 × Ro.1)
      - 103rd Reconnaissance Flight (9 × IMAM Ro.37)
      - 116th Reconnaissance Flight (10 × Ro.1)
      - 118th Reconnaissance Flight (10 × Ro.1) attached to II Army Corps
      - 131st Reconnaissance Flight (10 × Ro.1)
      - Libyan Reconnaissance Flight (11 × Ro.1) attached to I Army Corps
    - 106th Fighter Flight (7 × CR.20)
    - 4th Bombers Squadron – Brig.Gen. Attilio Matricardi
      - 14th Bomber Flight "Hic Sunt Leones" – (10 × Caproni Ca.101 D/2)
      - 15th Bomber Flight "La Disperata" – (10 × Ca.101 D/2)
    - 27th Bomber Squadron
      - 17th Bomber Flight (5 × Caproni Ca.111 light bombers)
      - 18th Bomber Flight (5 × Ca.111)
    - Hydroplanes Detachments (4 × Marinens Flyvebaatfabrikk M.F.4 floatplane and 2 × CANT 25 flying boat fighter)
    - 7th Bomber Wing detached to Somalia with 38 aircraft – Brig.Gen. Ferruccio Ranza (see below)

== Northern Front – Eritrea ==
- I Army Corps – Ruggiero Santini
  - 4th CC.NN. Division "3 Gennaio" (still in Italy) – Gen. Alessandro Traditi
    - 101st CC.NN. Legion "Sabauda"
    - 104th CC.NN. Legion "Santorre di Santarosa"
    - 215th CC.NN. Legion "Del Cimino"
  - 5th Alpine Division "Pusteria" – Gen. Luigi Negri Cesi
    - 7th Alpini Regiment
    - 11th Alpini Regiment
    - 5th Alpine Artillery Regiment
  - 26th Infantry Division "Assietta" – Gen. Enrico Riccardi
    - 38th Infantry Regiment "Ravenna"
    - 63rd Infantry Regiment "Cagliari"
    - 25th Artillery Regiment
  - 30th Infantry Division "Sabauda" – Gen. Italo Gariboldi
    - 3rd Bersaglieri Regiment (attached to the division)
    - 46th Infantry Regiment "Reggio"
    - 60th Infantry Regiment "Calabria"
    - 16th Artillery Regiment
  - X Indigenes Battalion (Eritrean Ascari)
  - XV Indigenes Battalion (Eritrean Ascari)
  - Banda dello Scimezana (native troop)
  - 5th Cavalry Squadrons Group
  - 3rd Motorized Artillery Group (77 mm/28)
  - 5th Motorized Artillery Group (105/28 cannons)
  - Artillery Command of positions of Agame
  - I Army Corps Engineer Unit
  - Libyan Reconnaissance Flight (11 × Ro.1)
- II Army Corps – Pietro Maravigna
  - 3rd CC.NN. Division "21 Aprile" – Gen. Giacomo Appiotti
    - 230th CC.NN. Legion "L'Aquila"
    - 252nd CC.NN. Legion "Acciaiata"
    - 263rd CC.NN. Legion "Tommaso Gulli"
  - 19th Infantry Division "Gavinana" – Gen. Nino Salvatore Villa Santa
    - 70th Infantry Regiment "Ancona"
    - 83rd Infantry Regiment "Venezia"
    - 84th Infantry Regiment "Venezia"
    - 19th Artillery Regiment
  - 24th Infantry Division "Gran Sasso" – Gen. Adalberto Principe (Adi Ugri-Quala zone)
    - 13th Infantry Regiment "Pinerolo"
    - 14th Infantry Regiment "Pinerolo"
    - 225th Infantry Regiment "Arezzo"
    - 18th Artillery Regiment
  - Gruppo Bande Altopiano (native troop)
  - 10th Cavalry Squadrons Group
  - Artillery Group Command (100 mm/17)
  - Artillery Command of positions in western Tigre (Eritrean Ascari)
  - 2nd Corps Engineer Unit
  - 118th Reconnaissance Flight (10 × Ro.1) (Libyan)
- Eritrean Corps – Alessandro Pirzio Biroli
  - 1st Eritrean Division – Gen. Salvatore di Pietro
    - 1st Mixed Brigade – Brig. Gen. Gallina
      - 1st Native Battalion Group
      - 5th Native Battalion Group
    - 3rd Mixed Brigade – Brig. Gen. Cubeddu
      - 2nd Native Battalion Group
      - 6th Native Battalion Group
  - 2nd Eritrean Division – Gen. Achille Vaccarisi
    - 2nd Mixed Brigade – Brig. Gen. Lorenzo Dalmazzo
      - 3rd Native Battalion Group
      - 7th Native Battalion Group
    - 4th Mixed Brigade – Brig. Gen. Gustavo Pesenti
      - 4th Native Battalion Group
      - 8th Native Battalion Group
  - 1st Eritrean CC.NN. Battalion Group – Filippo Diamanti
    - I, II, III and IV Italian East African CC.NN. Infantry Battalions
    - East African CC.NN. Machine-Gunners Company
  - Banda dell'Hassamò (Irregular troop)
  - 6th Cavalry Squadrons Group
  - Native Cavalry Squadron Group (Eritrean Ascari troop)
  - 2nd Motorized Artillery Group 77 mm/28
  - 3rd Motorized Artillery Group 100 mm/17 gun
  - 4th Fast Tanks Squadrons Group
  - Artillery Command of positions in eastern Tigre
  - Eritrean Corps Engineer Unit
  - 34th Reconnaissance Flight (8 × Ro.1)(Libyan)
- Western Lowlands Zone – Brig.Gen. Amedeo Couture
  - XXVII Indigenes Battalion (Eritrean Ascari)
  - XXVIII Indigenes Battalion (Eritrean Ascari)
  - Irregulars Foot Bands Group
  - "Celere" (fast) Group
  - Eritrea Fast Tanks Squadron
- Eastern Lowlands Zone – Brig.Gen. Oreste Mariotti
  - XXIV Indigenes Battalion (Eritrean Ascari)
  - XXVI Indigenes Battalion (Eritrean Ascari)
  - Libyan Battalion
  - Massaua Irregulars Band
  - Northern Dankalia Irregulars Band
  - Southern Dankalia Irregulars Band
  - 7th Artillery Battery (120L25)
  - 37th Artillery Battery (77L28 – pack camels)

Sent to the front in February 1936

- III Army Corps – Lt.Gen. Ettore Bastico
  - 27th Infantry Division "Sila" – Gen. Francesco Bertini
    - 16th Infantry Regiment "Savona"
    - 19th Infantry Regiment "Brescia"
    - 20th Infantry Regiment "Brescia"
    - 12th Artillery Regiment
  - 1st CC.NN. Division "23 Marzo" – Gen. Filiberto Ludovico from Eritrean Corps
    - 135th CC.NN. Legion "Indomita"
    - 192nd CC.NN. Legion "Francesco Ferrucci"
    - 202nd CC.NN. Legion "Cacciatori del Tevere"

Formed in January 1936

- IV Army Corps – Gen. Ezio Babbini
  - 5th Infantry Division "Cosseria" – Gen. Pietro Pintor
    - 41st Infantry Regiment "Modena"
    - 42nd Infantry Regiment "Modena"
    - 29th Artillery Regiment
  - 2nd CC.NN. Division "28 Ottobre" – Gen. Umberto Somma
    - 114th CC.NN. Legion "Garibaldina"
    - 116th CC.NN. Legion "Alpina"
    - 180th CC.NN. Legion "Alessandro Farnese"
  - 5th CC.NN. Division "1 Febbraio" (still in Italy) – Gen. Attilio Teruzzi
    - 107th CC.NN. Legion "Cairoli"
    - 128th CC.NN. Legion "Randaccio"
    - 142nd CC.NN. Legion "Berica"

Organized in March 1936

- Celere Column A.O. (Eritrea), Lt.Gen. Achille Starace
  - 82nd CC.NN. Battalion "Mussolini"/6th CC.NN. Battalions Group, motorised
  - 8th Artillery Group (77 mm/28, motorised)
  - Included truck-transported machine-guns, armoured cars, altogether 3,000 men and 500 motor vehicles.

== Southern Front – Somaliland ==
- Southern Front – General Rodolfo Graziani
  - 29th Infantry Division "Peloritana" – Gen. Giuseppe Pavone
    - 3rd Infantry Regiment "Piemonte"
    - 4th Infantry Regiment "Piemonte"
    - 75th Infantry Regiment "Napoli"
    - 24th Artillery Regiment
  - Libyan Division (Libyan Colonial troops) – Gen. Guglielmo Nasi
    - 1st Libyan Infantry Regiment
    - 2nd Libyan Infantry Regiment
    - 3rd Libyan Infantry Regiment
    - 1st Libyan Artillery Regiment
  - 6th CC.NN. Division "Tevere" (still in Italy) – Enrico Boscardi
    - 219th CC.NN. Legion "Vittorio Veneto"
    - 220th CC.NN. Legion
    - 221st CC.NN. Legion "Fasci italiani all'estero"
    - 321st CC.NN. Legion "Fasci italiani all'estero"
  - I Machine Gunners Squadrons Group "Genova" and II Machine Gunners Squadrons Group "Genova" (formed by the Regiment "Genova Cavalleria")
  - III Machine Gunners Squadrons Group "Aosta" and IV Machine Gunners Squadrons Group "Aosta" (formed by the Regiment "Lancieri di Aosta")
  - 6x Battalions, Royal Colonial Troop Corps (Arab-Somali Colonial troops)
  - Camel Mounted Artillery
  - 6x Dubat Bands (Companies of Somali Irregulars)
  - Ogaden border region command – Colonel Luigi Frusci
    - 9 L3 tanks, 20 Armoured cars
    - 6 Royal Colonial Troop Corps Battalions (Arabo-Somali Colonial troops)
    - 6 Dubat Bands (Companies of Somali Irregulars)
    - 150 trucks
  - Sultan Olol Dinke Column (Feudal Army) – Olol Dinke, Sultan of Sciavelli
    - 1000 Dubat (mounted Somali warriors of the Ajuran clan)
- 7th Bomber Wing – Brig.Gen. Ferruccio Ranza (38 aircraft)
  - 25th Bomber Squadron:
    - 8th Bomber Flight (10 × Ca.101 bis)
    - 9th Bomber Flight (10 × Ca.101 bis)
  - Reconnaissance Flight (10 × Ro.1)
  - 107th Fighter Flight (8 × CR.20)

== Libya ==
Forces were deployed in Libya to threaten the Suez Canal should the British close it to Italian traffic. These units were considered to have taken part in the campaign.

- 18th Infantry Division "Metauro"
  - 93rd Infantry Regiment "Messina"
  - 157th Infantry Regiment "Liguria"
  - 2nd Artillery Regiment
- 126th Infantry Division "Assietta II" (temporarily formed unit)
  - 61st Infantry Regiment "Sicilia" (detached from the 8th Infantry Division "Po")
  - 81st Infantry Regiment "Torino" (detached from the 22nd Infantry Division "Cacciatori delle Alpi")
  - 25th Artillery Regiment (detached from the 26th Infantry Division "Assietta")
- Motorized Division "Trento"
  - 115th Infantry Regiment "Treviso"
  - 116th Infantry Regiment "Treviso"
  - 46th Artillery Regiment
- 7th CC.NN. Division "Cirene"
  - 190th CC.NN. Legion "Pisa"
  - 196th CC.NN. Legion "Petrarca"
  - 198th CC.NN. Legion "Maremma"
  - 219th CC.NN. Legion "Ricciotti"
  - 241st CC.NN. Legion "Volturno"
  - 267th CC.NN. Legion "Etna"
  - 271st CC.NN. Legion "Vespri"
  - 352nd CC.NN. Legion "Acciaiata"
  - 7th Motorized Artillery Regiment (Royal Italian Army)

== See also ==
- Second Italo-Ethiopian War
- List of Second Italo-Ethiopian War weapons of Italy
- Ethiopian order of battle in the Second Italo-Ethiopian War
