= Ruggero Santini =

Italian general (1870–1958)

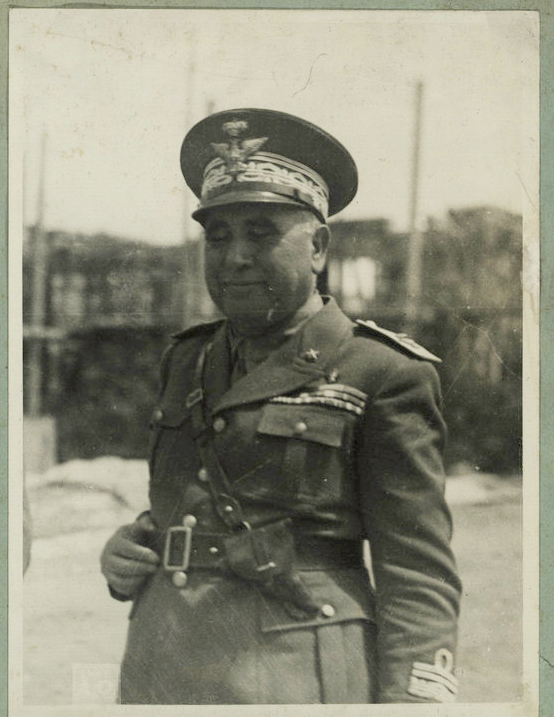
Ruggero Santini

Ruggero Santini (April 16, 1870 – April 4, 1958) was an Italian general. He was the colonial governor of Somaliland. He fought in the First Italo-Ethiopian War and Italo-Turkish War. In World War I he fought against Austria-Hungary.

During the Second Italo-Ethiopian War he commanded the 1st Corps and fought in the North against the Ethiopians.

== Awards ==
- Commemorative Medal for the Italo-Austrian War 1915–1918

Preceded by Angelo De Ruben	Italian Governor of Somaliland; 1936–1937	Succeeded by Francesco Saverio Caroselli
