= Mulugeta Yeggazu =

Ethiopian politician (1865–1936)

- ሙሉጌታ ይገዙ
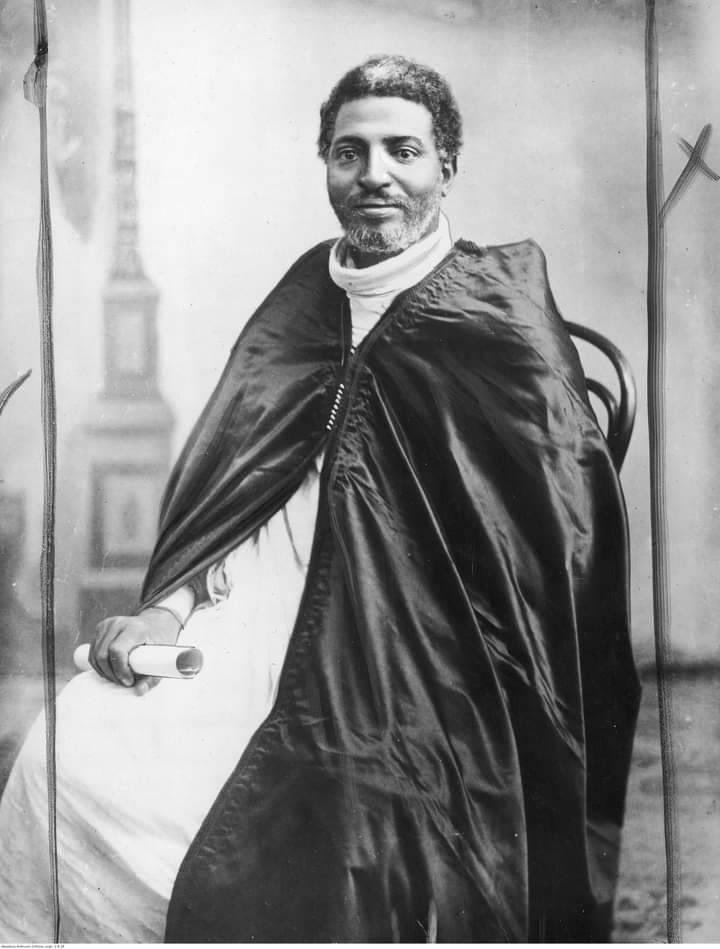

Minister of War
- In office 1926–1936
- Monarchs: Zewditu; Haile Selassie
- Preceded by: Habte Giyorgis
- Succeeded by: Birru Walda Gabriel

Minister of Foreign Affairs
- In office 1916–1917
- Monarch: Zewditu
- Preceded by: Dejazmatch Beyene Yimer
- Succeeded by: Wolde Meskel Tariku

Minister of Finance
- In office 1907–1915
- Preceded by: post established
- Succeeded by: Ras Bitweded Haile Giyorgis Woldemikael

Personal details
- Born: 1865 Menz, Shewa, Ethiopian Empire
- Died: 27 February 1936 (aged 71) Korem, Tigray Province, Ethiopian Empire
- Military career
- Allegiance: Ethiopian Empire
- Branch: Ethiopian Army
- Service years: 1895–1936
- Commands: Mehal Sefari
- Conflicts: First Italo-Ethiopian War; Battle of Adwa; Gugsa Wale's Rebellion; Battle of Anchem; Second Italo-Ethiopian War; Battle of Amba Aradam †

Ras Mulugeta Yeggazu (Note: Mulugeta Yeggazu is also spelled in various sources as Mulugeta Yegazu) (Amharic: ሙሉጌታ ይገዙ; 1865 – 27 February 1936) was an Ethiopian military officer and politician, who served in the first cabinet formed by Emperor Menelik II. He served as Imperial Fitawrari, Commander of the Mahel Sefari (Central Army) of the Ethiopian Army during the Second Italo-Ethiopian War.

== Biography ==
Of Amhara descent, Mulugeta came from Menz in Shewa, he was relative of Emperor Menelik II and Tessema Nadew, and was a descendant of Tedu, the 18th century ruler of Morat in northern Shewa.

Mulugeta fought as a young warrior in the Battle of Adwa during the First Italo-Ethiopian War in 1896. In January 1905, he became palace treasurer (Bajerond), and a confidant of Menelik II. In 1908, he served as Minister of Finance during the last years of Emperor Menelik II's reign. He was demoted when Menelik's health detoriated and affairs was nominally ruled by Lij Iyasu. Tessema Nadew, regent of Ethiopia, reappointed Mulugeta as dejazmach over Gimira to the west Jimma. In 1916, after the deposition of Lij Iyasu, he was again made minister of Finance under Empress Zewditu.

From 1916 to 1917, he was Ethiopia's Minister of Foreign Affairs. While governor of Illubabor, Mulugeta escorted then Ras Tafari (the later Emperor Haile Selassie) on his tour of Europe in 1924. In 1926, he was appointed as Minister of War, and a few years later commanded the loyalist troops to victory at the Battle of Anchem.

During the Second Italo-Ethiopian War, Mulugeta was appointed Imperial Commander of the Vanguard (Fitawrari) to replace the disgraced Birru Wolde Gabriel. On 10 February 1936, the decisive battle of Amba Aradam (Enderta) began, lasting nine days. Pietro Badoglio deployed four army divisions and two Blackshirt divisions against Mulugeta's 80,000-man "Army of the Centre," which was equipped with machine guns, a small number of field guns, and anti-aircraft weapons. The Italians used overwhelming firepower, including 280 artillery pieces, heavy machine-gun fire, and 170 aircraft that carried out hundreds of raids, dropping large quantities of bombs, including mustard gas. Between 12 and 15 February, Italian forces encircled the Amba. On 15 February 1936, Mulugeta abandoned the battlefield at Amba Aradam to evade the encirclement. As news spread, his Army of the Centre collapsed, and large numbers of Ethiopian troops began retreating south.

As the remnants of Mulugeta's army retreated south, hoping to join Haile Selassie's main force at Dessie, Mulugeta and a small force from Welega was ambushed near Korem by the Azebo Oromo which were supported by three Italian bombers. During the attack, Mulugeta's son, Tadesse Mulugeta, was killed. Enraged and anguished, Mulugeta turned back to avenge his son, only to find that the Azebo Oromo mutilated and castrated his corpse. He was then killed in unclear circumstances.

== See also ==
- First Italo-Ethiopian War
  - Battle of Adwa
- Gugsa Welle's Rebellion
  - Battle of Anchem
- Second Italo-Ethiopian War
  - Ethiopian Christmas Offensive
  - Battle of Amba Aradam
