= List of Second Italo-Ethiopian War weapons of Italy =

This is a list of weapons used by the Italian Regio Esercito during the Second Italo-Ethiopian War.

== Small arms ==
=== Rifles ===
- Carcano
- Steyr-Mannlicher M1895 (Received as reparations after World War 1)

=== Carbines ===
- Beretta M1918/30

=== Sidearms ===
- Beretta M1934
- Bodeo Model 1889

=== Machine guns ===
- Breda 30-LMG
- Fiat–Revelli Modello 1914-MMG
- Breda Mod. 5C-MMG

=== Submachine guns ===
- OVP 1918

== Armoured fighting vehicles (AFVs) ==
- L3/33
- L3/35

== Tank ==
- Fiat 3000
