= Imru Haile Selassie =

Ethiopian soldier, noble and diplomat (1892–1980)

Imru Haile Selassie ዕምሩ ኀይለ ሥላሴ
- Leul Ras
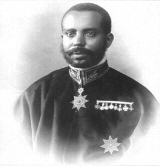

Governor of Gojjam
- Reign: 1932–1936
- Predecessor: Hailu Tekle Haymanot
- Successor: none

Regent of Ethiopia
- Reign: 1935–1936
- Regent for: Haile Selassie I
- Born: 23 November 1892; Harrar, Ethiopian Empire
- Died: 15 August 1980 (aged 87); Addis Ababa, Ethiopia
- Burial: Holy Trinity Cathedral
- Spouse: Leult Tsigue Mariam Gabre Rufael
- Issue: Woyzero Yemiserach Imru; Woyzero Martha Imru; Lij Mikael Imru; Woyzero Hirut Imru; Woyzero Yodit Imru; Woyzero Elleni Imru; Woyzero Ruphael-Tsigemariam Imru; Woyzerit Mamiye Imru
- House: Solomonic Dynasty
- Father: Dejazmatch Haile Selassie Abayne
- Mother: Woizero Mazlekia Ayala Worq
- Religion: Ethiopian Orthodox
- Occupation: Military leader, diplomat

Prime Minister of Ethiopia
- Acting
- In office 14 December 1960 – 17 December 1960
- Preceded by: Abebe Aregai
- Succeeded by: Vacant

Leul Ras Imru Haile Selassie, CBE (Amharic: ዕምሩ ኀይለ ሥላሴ; 23 November 1892 – 15 August 1980) was an Ethiopian noble, soldier, and diplomat. He served as acting Prime Minister for three days in 1960 during a coup d'état and assassination of Prime Minister Abebe Aregai. Imru was the cousin of Emperor Haile Selassie.

== Biography ==
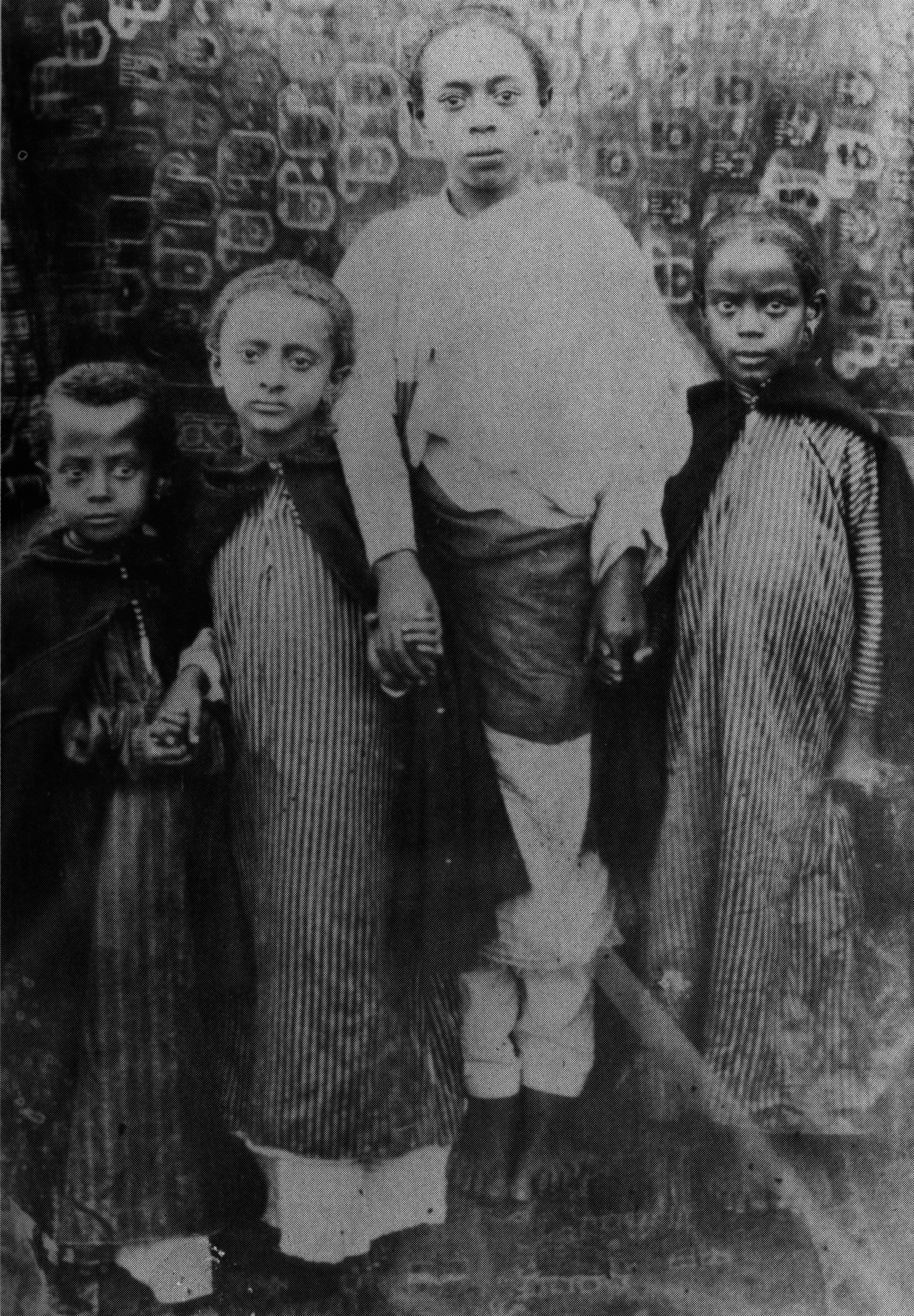
Tafari Belew, Lij Tafari Makonnen, Beru, Imru Haile Sellassie

Born in Harrar Province, Imru was the childhood friend of his first cousin once removed Haile Selassie I (Imru's mother, Mazlekia Ayala Worq, was Haile Selassie's first cousin); both were tutored together under Abba Samuel Wolde Kahin, and were raised by Imru's father Haile Selassie Abayne, whom Harold G. Marcus describes as the Emperor's "real father", asserting that "Makonnen's son recalled the surrogate with affection, whereas he invariably referred to his father with formality and deference."

He went on to attend the Menelik II School in Addis Ababa.

Both Imru and his father accompanied the future ruler to his first governorship in Sidamo. In 1916/17 Imru, by then a Dejazmach, was appointed Vice-Governor of Harar province by his cousin. In 1927, Imru was appointed Shum (Governor-General) of Wollo province when Gugsa Welle failed to end a smoldering rebellion there.

In 1931, Imru was promoted to Ras and made Shum (Governor-General) of Gojjam province. Imru replaced Ras Hailu Tekle Haymanot, who had been convicted of treason for allegedly helping the deposed Lij Iyasu escape, and sentenced to life imprisonment. Upon arriving in Gojjam, Imru was immediately faced with a revolt by Fitawrari Admassu, a natural son of the imprisoned Ras, who on 30 September briefly held Debre Marqos; not long afterwards Admassu ended his revolt, sending messengers to the Emperor to ask for pardon. Nevertheless, despite numerous reforms and efforts to modernise the province, which enriched both the producers and traders, Imru found few friends in Gojjam and "was invariably viewed as an outsider, the emperor's agent, and, unable to rule by consensus, he governed by force."

From October 1935, Imru led his provincial army and commanded the Army of the Left in the Second Italo-Abyssinian War. During the war, he served specifically as the Commander-in-Chief of Ethiopian troops on the Shire Front. His early offensive deep into the Italian rear threatened the Italian advance. Ultimately Imru was stopped and his army was destroyed by the use of poison gas dropped from the air.

In May 1936, Haile Selassie appointed his cousin as Prince Regent in his absence, departing Ethiopia with his family to present the case of Ethiopia to the League of Nations at Geneva. Ras Imru fell back to Gore in southern Ethiopia to reorganise and continue to resist the Italians for a full year.

For this to have worked, he needed the revenue of the gold mines of Asosa, but the loyal Sheikh Hojali was driven out in July 1936 by rebellious Welega Oromo, who also made Ras Imru's position in Gore untenable, and he retreated to the southeast. The Italians followed him, and pinned him down on the north bank of the Gojeb River, where he surrendered 19 December 1936. Following his surrender, Imru was flown to Italy and interned for nearly seven years. His captivity included three years on the island of Ponza, three years on 'Lipari, and a final eight months in Calabria. He was eventually liberated by the'British 8th Army in September 1943, following the formal surrender of Italy.

After the war, Ras Imru was appointed Governor-General of Begumdir in 1944, and Crown Councilor, serving as Ambassador to India, the United States, and the Soviet Union. He represented Ethiopia during the 1947–1948 Special Session on the Palestine question. Always a man of modernist and reformist views, as well as deeply religious Ras Imru increasingly began to lean towards a left of centre political stance that would probably have had him classified as a socialist in the western European sense.

Both he and his son Mikael Imru became advocates for land reform, and he went as far as distributing his own extensive estates to his tenant farmers. Due to these political views, Ras Imru was nicknamed "the Red Ras" by many contemporaries.

Regardless of his leftist sympathies, Ras Imru remained a confidant of the Emperor and a monarchist. However, when the Derg deposed Emperor Haile Selassie in September 1974, they asked Ras Imru to accompany them to the Emperor's palace to witness the act.

Eyewitness accounts relate that the Ras was visibly distressed as the members of the Derg announced to the Emperor that he was deposed and that they required him to accompany them to his place of detention. The Emperor and Ras Imru had a whispered conversation after which the Emperor agreed to go peacefully.

The Ras then asked to be allowed to accompany the Emperor to wherever the soldiers were taking him, and became distraught when permission was refused. The members then assured the Prince that he could come to see the Emperor later in the day. It is believed that the Derg did not want to subject Ras Imru to the insults and humiliation that were directed at the Emperor by Derg sympathisers as he was driven away from the palace.

After his death in August 1980, Ras Imru became the only member of the Imperial dynasty to be given a state funeral by the Derg. Television and radio announcements of his death accorded him his full titles of Prince, Ras, and the dignity of "His Highness" even though the Derg had abolished all Imperial titles in 1974.

He was publicly and officially eulogised as a former prince regent, a distinguished diplomat, an early progressive, and a leader of the resistance against the Italian occupation. No mention was made of his blood ties to the Imperial family or his lifelong close association with the late Emperor.

== Honours ==
- Commander of the Most Excellent Order of the British Empire (United Kingdom, 8 July 1924).
- Knight Grand Cross of the Royal Norwegian Order of Saint Olav (Kingdom of Norway, 10 January 1966).
- Knight Grand Cross of the Order of Orange-Nassau (Kingdom of The Netherlands, 4 February 1969

== See also ==
- Black Lions
- Mikael Imru
