= List of Italian military equipment in the Second Italo-Ethiopian War =

This is a list of military equipment used by Italy during the Second Italo-Ethiopian War.

== Weapons ==
- List of Second Italo-Ethiopian War weapons of Italy

== Aircraft ==
- List of Regia Aeronautica aircraft used in the Second Italo-Ethiopian War
