= List of Second Italo-Ethiopian War weapons of Ethiopia =

Second Italo-Ethiopian War Weapons

This is a list of weapons used by Ethiopia during the Second Italo-Ethiopian War. Ethiopian weapons mainly consisted of the various small arms that Ethiopia had bought over the years.

== Small arms ==
=== Sidearms ===
- Beretta M1934 (captured)
- Mauser C96

=== Rifles ===
- Berdan rifle (some cut-down rifles)
- Berthier rifle (some cut-down rifles)
- Carcano (captured)
- Chassepot
- FN Model 24 and Model 30
- Fusil Gras mle 1874 – most popular (some cut-down rifles)
- Gewehr 1888 (some cut-down rifles)
- Gewehr 98
- Karabiner 98k
- Kropatschek rifle
- Lebel Model 1886 rifle (some cut-down rifles)
- Lee Enfield
- M1870 Italian Vetterli (some cut-down rifles)
- Mannlicher M1888 (some cut-down rifles)
- Mannlicher M1890 carbine
- Mannlicher M1895
- Martini–Henry
- Mauser Model 1871
- Mauser Standardmodell
- Mosin–Nagant
- Remington Rolling Block rifle
- Snider–Enfield
- Werndl–Holub rifle
- ZH-29

=== Carbines ===
- Revelli-Beretta M1918 and Beretta M1918/30

=== Machine guns ===
- Breda M1930 (captured)
- FN Model 30
- Hotchkiss Mle 1914 machine gun
- M1917 Browning machine gun
- Madsen machine gun
- SIG KE7
- Vickers Class C
- ZB vz. 26
- ZB vz. 30

=== Submachine guns ===
- Bergmann BMP-34/I
- Haenal MP-28/II
- OVP 1918 (bought from Italy before the war)
- Steyr-Solothurn MP-34

== Armoured fighting vehicles (AFVs) ==
=== Tanks ===
- Fiat 3000 – four Model 1921 models bought from Italy in 1925–1930

=== Tankettes ===
- L3/33 – captured from Italy during the war
