= Ethiopian military titles =

The military ranks of the Ethiopian Army originally came from the traditional organization of their forces. An army in the field or in camp was composed of a vanguard, main body, left and right wings and a rear body. The titles of the upper level of officers reflected this organization:

- Dejazmatch (ደጃዝማች, Commander or general of the Gate) a military title meaning commander of the central body of a traditional Ethiopian armed force.
- Fitawrari (ፊታውራሪ, Commander of the Vanguard), a military title meaning commander of the vanguard of a traditional Ethiopian armed force.
- Qegnazmach (ቀኛዝማች, Commander of the Right wing) a military title meaning commander of the right wing of a traditional Ethiopian armed force.
- Grazmach (ግራዝማች, Commander of the Left Wing) a military title meaning commander of the left wing of a traditional Ethiopian armed force.*

Azmach (አዝማች, Commander of the Rearguard) a military title meaning commander of the rearguard of a traditional Ethiopian armed force. This was usually a trustworthy counselor and the leader's chief minister.

- Balambaras (ባላምባራስ, Commander of an Amba or fortress), these could also be commanders of the guards, artillery or cavalry of a traditional Ethiopian armed force, a man entrusted with important military commands.

The above titles which were originally purely military ranks later became titles of nobility held by men of no military background. The titles were granted by regional rulers until Emperor Haile Selassie ended the practice and they became the sole gift of the monarch. Many individuals hold the titles up to the present time.

Traditionally the governors of the provinces were at the head of their local Sefari (provincial or district armed force) and levy. Depending on the importance of their locality they were called Dejazmach Negarit, Degiac Negarit or Degiac. A Degiac was the commander of a unit equivalent to a regiment, composed of two to three thousand men.

The traditional army units were organized on the decimal system and the titles of their commanders, the Basciai, reflected this organization:

- Shaleqa (Commander of a Thousand), later as modern military organization was adopted it came to mean the commanding officer of a Battalion or Major.
- Shambel (Commander of Two Hundred fifty), later as modern military organization was adopted it came to mean the commanding officer of a Company or a Captain.
- Meto Aleqa (Commander of One Hundred), later as modern military organization was adopted it came to mean commander of a platoon or lieutenant.
- Amsa Aleqa as modern military organization was adopted this rank came to be that of an NCO commander of a platoon.
- Ila Ammist Aleqa as modern military organization was adopted this rank came to be that of an NCO.
- Asiraleqa (Commander of Ten), later as modern military organization was adopted it came to mean squad leader or Corporal.

These ranks have been retained in the modern army, the upper rank titles of the army follow the European model.

== Sources ==
- Mockler, Anthony, Haile Selassie's War. New York: Olive Branch Press, 2003. ISBN 1-56656-473-5
- Paulos Milkias, Maimire Mennasemay, Getachew Metaferia, The Battle of Adwa: Reflections on Ethiopia's Historic Victory Against European Colonialism, Algora Publishing, 2005. ISBN 0-87586-413-9
- "La preparazione abissina", Articoli tratti da Cronache illustrate dell'azione italiana in A.O., Tuminelli e C. Editori, Roma, 1936.
