= Begemder =

Historic province in northwestern Ethiopia

Coordinates: 12°30′N 37°00′E

Location of Begemder within the Ethiopian Empire

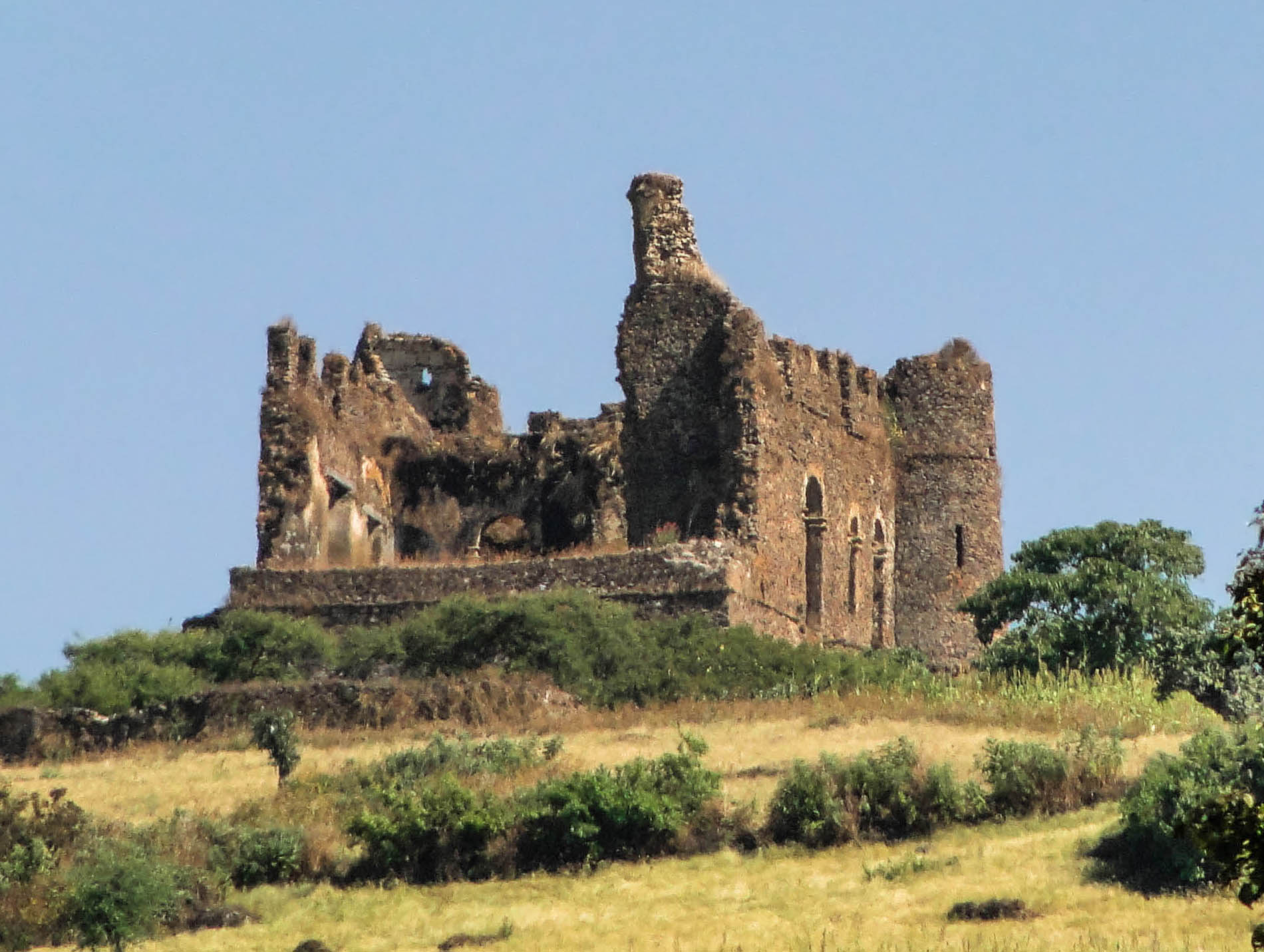
Guzara royal castle; built by Emperor Minas in 1560

Begemder (Amharic: በጌምድር, begēmdir; also known as Gonder) was a province in northwest Ethiopia. The alternative names come from its capital during the 20th century, Gondar.

== Etymology ==
A plausible source for the name Bega is that the word means "dry" in the local language, while another possible interpretation could be "sheep," where rearing of sheep is beg in Amharic. Thus, Begemder likely refers to "land that rears sheep" or "the dry area." Another etymology is that the first two syllables come from the Ge'ez language baggi` for sheep (Amharic: beg medir) "Land of Sheep." Beckingham and Huntingford note that Begemder originally applied to the country east of Lake Tana, where water is scarce, and concluded, "The allusion to the lack of water suggests Amharic baga, "dry season," as a possible source of the name."

Another, less likely, etymology proposed for the name is that it came from Bega (Beja) plus meder (land) (meaning land of the Bega or Beja), as an inscription of Emperor (Ezana) of Aksum describes his movement of 4,400 conquered Beja to a not yet located province named Matlia.

== History ==
The earliest recorded mention of Begemder was on the Fra Mauro map (c. 1460), where it is described as a kingdom. While Emperor Lebna Dengel, in his letter to the King of Portugal (1526), also described Begemder as a kingdom, he included it as a subdivision of his empire. Kanfat in southern Begemder was briefly governed by Abubaker Qecchin of Adal in the sixteenth century. The Guzara royal castle; built by Emperor Minas in 1560 in Enfraz, Begemder (60 km (37 mi) east of Gonder) as a site of royal residence and camp a century before Emperor Fasilides founded and built the castles of Gondar. During the later 18th century, its capital was at Filakit Gereger, where Ras Ali died in 1788.

Begemder's boundaries were revised as a result of Proclamation 1943/1, which created 12 taklai ghizats from the existing 42 provinces of varying sizes. Begemder had an estimated population of 3 million in the 1984 cenus.

== See also ==
- History of Ethiopia
- Subdivisions of Ethiopia
- Gondar
