= Ras (title) =

Royal title in the Ethiopian Empire

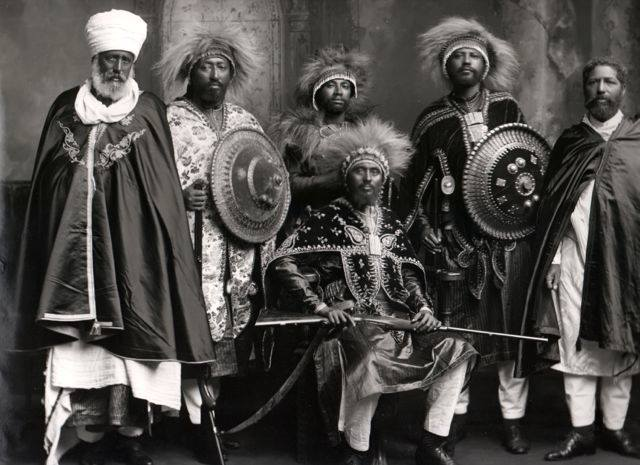
Makonnen Wolde Mikael, known simply as Ras Makonnen, and his followers of the Ethiopian nobility

Ras (Amharic: ራስ, romanized: ras, lit. 'head' compare with Arabic Rais or Hebrew Rosh), is a noble title in the Ethiopian Semitic languages. It is one of the powerful non-imperial titles. Pronounced rəʾs in Geʽez, historian Harold G. Marcus equates the Ras title to a duke; others have compared it to "prince".

The combined title of Leul Ras (Amharic: ልዑል ራስ) was given to the heads of the cadet branches of the Imperial dynasty, such as the Princes of Gojjam, Tigray, and the Selalle sub-branch of the last reigning Shewan Branch, and meaning "Lord of Lords", the highest title of lord.

== Historic Ras ==
- Ras Hamalmal of Kambata (16th century)
- Ras Fasil
- Ras Wolde Selassie (1736–1816)
- Ras Sabagadis Woldu (1780–1831)
- Ras Alula (1827–1897)
- Ras Gobana Dacche (1821–1889)
- Ras Mekonnen Wolde Mikael (1852–1906)
- Ras Mengesha Yohannes (1868–1906)
- Ras Araya Selassie Yohannes (1869/70-10 June 1888)
- Ras Sebhat Aregawi (1892–1914)
- Ras Gugsa Welle
- Ras Gugsa Araya Selassie
- Ras Kassa Haile Darge (1881–1956)
- Ras Tafari (also Leul Ras; the latter emperor Haile Selassie, 1892–1975)
- Ras Darge Sahle Selassie (1830 – 23 March 1900)
- Ras Abebe Aregai (1903–1960)
- Ras Wubneh Tessema (1943–1974)

== Other uses ==
An Italian Ras (from the homonymous Ethiopian title) was first the local leader of a squadrismo militia organised by the early fascists outside the authority of the Italian state and later a type of gerarca (higher officer of fascist ruled italy) dominating a province. Italo Balbo was the Ras of Ferrara, Roberto Farinacci of Cremona, and Cesare Forni of Pavia. Today the term is used for a local boss of organized crime or to describe an authority who exercises power despotically.

One of the clearest attestations is at Palmyra, where Odaenathus and his son Hairan I bore the Palmyrene title ras in bilingual inscriptions, rendered in the Greek text as exarchos. Modern scholarship treats this as a local title of supreme authority or lordship, probably created for Odaenathus in response to the Sasanian threat and vested with exceptional civil and military authority.

- Ras of Tayma (attested 203 CE), title known from a grave slab mentioning a syh, or chief, of Tayma
- Ras of Palmyra (attested October 251 CE), title borne by Hairan I
- Ras of Palmyra (attested 252–267 CE), title borne by Odaenathus
- Ras of Hegra (attested 356 CE), title known from a late Nabataean inscription as ryš ḥgrʾ (“chief of Hegra”)

The term "Rastafari" derives from "Ras Tafari Makonnen", the pre-regnal title of Haile Selassie.

== See also ==
- Ethiopian aristocratic and court titles
- Ethiopian military titles
- Negus
