= Retreat to Lake Ashenge =

Ethiopian retreat attempt on Lake Ashenge
- Part of the Second Italo-Ethiopian War
- Location of Lake Ashenge and Maychew in Ethiopia
Date	3–5 April 1936 (2 days)
Location	Lake Ashenge, near Maychew, Tigray, Ethiopian Empire
Result	Italian victory

Belligerents
Italy	Ethiopia

Commanders and leaders
(Fascist Italy) Pietro Badoglio (Fascist Italy) Vincenzo Magliocco (Fascist Italy) Gustavo Pesenti	(Ethiopian Empire) Haile Selassie (Ethiopian Empire) Ras Getachew

Units involved
(Kingdom of Italy) Regio Corpo Truppe Coloniali: 5th Alpine Division "Pusteria"; 1st Eritrean Division; 2nd Eritrean Division	Imperial Ethiopian Army

Strength
30,000 men and 150 aircraft	Around 20,000 men

Casualties and losses
(Fascist Italy) 15 dead and 31 wounded	(Ethiopian Empire) Around 3,000 dead

The Battle of Lake Ashenge, also called the Retreat of Lake Ashenge, was a skirmish that occurred during the Second Italo-Ethiopian War between the Italian army and the Ethiopian troops. The battle was not essentially a head-on clash between two armies, but rather a pursuit that the Italian troops carried out against the Imperial Army defeated in the previous Battle of Maychew. In this battle, the contribution of the Regia Aeronautica was decisive as it decimated the Ethiopian troops on the shores of Lake Ashenge, effectively breaking apart the last army of the northern front.

== Background in Maychew ==
After the defeat of Ras Immrù in the Battle of Shire, Hailé Selassié gathered his imperial guard and moved north to meet the Italian army. The Italians headed towards the Maychew valley and, having arrived before the Ethiopians, took care of preparing the fortifications and clearing the land. On the 31st of that same month, at dawn, the Abyssinians attacked the Alpine troops of the "Pusteria" but were blocked and then finally repelled, however the imperial guard managed to conquer several positions against the 2nd Eritrean Division without succeeding properly in carrying out the planned breakthrough of the Italian lines. The Italian cointerattack was carried out by some Ascari that were part of the "Toselli" battalion, who were then joined by the Alpine troops of "Pusteria" themselves. The battle ended with heavy losses for both sides.

The following day Hailé Selassié was convinced that he could continue the battle but, finding opposition from his leaders Ras Kassa and Ras Seyoum who believed that the survivors were not strong enough to face the Italian troops, he decided to retreat from the hills overlooking the south the Mecan plain to reach Aià Gherghis.

After having spent the whole day of April 3 drawing up war plans, Hailé Selassié decided to withdraw his army to the mountains around Quoram and to fortify himself awaiting the arrival of the Italians, at the same time he ordered Ras Seyoum and his men to filter through the Italian lines and return to Tigray to conduct guerrilla actions.

== The Battle ==
=== Italian advance from Maychew ===
While the emperor was drawing up plans to attempt further resistance, the Italian 1st Army Corps emerged from the trenches of Maychew and began a rapid advance, sweeping away the Ethiopian troops left behind in the rear guard placed under the command of Ras Ghetacciù and occupying the same day of April 3 the Amba Gudom and Ezbà pass. At the same time, the Eritrean army corps composed of the 1st Eritrean Division and the 2nd Eritrean Division began a vast enveloping maneuver on the right flank of the Ethiopian deployment, with the aim of taking the remains of the imperial army from behind thanks to a pincer maneuver and precluding hence any possibility of retreat to Quoram.

=== The Ethiopian retreat ===
Having learned of the maneuver implemented by the Italians and worried that the remnants of the imperial army could remain stuck in the trap created by Badoglio, Hailé Selassié ordered the 20,000 men he had left to retreat in an orderly manner towards Quoram. Hailé Selassie, wearing a pith helmet and riding a white horse, then began his retreat in an orderly manner, attacked by the Azebo Galla tribes on the flanks of the Ethiopian army. However, due to the lack of supplies and the heavy defeats suffered, the army began to dissolve and the men ended up no longer obeying the orders of their leaders, advancing without any guide on the steep mountain paths that sloped down to the dangerously exposed basin of Lake Ashenge due to the lack of vegetation.

=== Pietro Badoglio's "trap" ===
In the meantime, Badoglio, having learned that the Ethiopians troops were in retreat, decided to finalize the victory at Maychew as much as possible to definitively rout what remained of the last Ethiopian army on the northern front.

Already on the 2nd of April he ordered General Vincenzo Magliocco to throw the entire air force of the Eritrean colony or the Air Bombardment Brigade in pursuit of the Ethiopian troops, expressly asking that "All aviators take to the skies and give no respite to the enemy. Tell them on my behalf that they will eat in forty-eight hours." On the same day the Italian bombers dropped 26.3 tons of explosives on the positions held by the Ethiopian rearguard troops, and on 3 April they dropped another 16.8 tons, again countered by the Ethiopian anti-aircraft fire which damaged 14 aircraft.

On April 4, 150 Italian planes surprised the retreating army near the shores of Lake Ashenge at first light. In a completely exposed position and without air cover, the Armed Ethiopian Columns who had recklessly moved during the day on the only path that runs along the left bank of the lake, also because they were followed from behind by Ruggero Santini's men and those of Alessandro Biroli, became easy prey for the Italian air force.

Throughout the day, 155 aerial actions were carried out with the dropping of 70 tons of bombs, many of which were loaded with mustard gas, and 20,000 machine gun shots were fired. On the other hand, the Ethiopians hit 28 aircraft, shooting down one. In addition to the action of the air force, the Ethiopian troops had to face the ambushes of the Azebo Galla tribes who attacked them during the entire retreat march, up to the gates of Quoram, while the Ethiopian rearguard was hammered by the artillery of the 1st Eritrean Division of general Gustavo Pesenti which in the afternoon had appeared on the mountains around Mecaré and which had quickly placed the artillery to strike the enemy troops, reporting at the end of the day the loss of 15 men against thousands losses inflicted on the Ethiopians.

In the meantime, the emperor had found refuge in a cave in the mountains north of the lake in the Mariam Aschenge area, from where he was able to observe the following day the banks of the lake fringed by the bodies of the wounded from the day before who had been killed by drinking the water poisoned with toxic gases.

=== The capture of Quoram ===
Meanwhile, on 5 April the ascari of the 1st Eritrean Division arrived at the gates of Quoram where they encountered resistance from the defensive garrison of the stronghold which occupied the Eritrean ascari for a few hours. However, an enveloping maneuver by Pesenti's men surrounded the defenders who were annihilated and allowed the Italian-Eritrean troops to enter the city and occupy it.

== Aftermath ==
The Retreat of Lake Ashange caused the complete disintegration of the imperial army; the emperor, renouncing any desire for revenge, especially due to the lack of a sufficient number of men capable of facing a battle, decided to break away from the pressing action of the Italian troops. Having abandoned the idea of retreating to Dessiè, which was too subject to attacks by the Italian air force, he decided to proceed along difficult and little-known paths: marching only at night until he could see the shores of the Tekezé.

Badoglio's troops, however, no longer had any serious obstacle blocking their way to the capital of the empire; the marshal then began planning the March on Addis Abeba.
