= Ofla =

Coordinates: 12°30′N 39°20′E

Ofla ኦፍላ
- Woreda
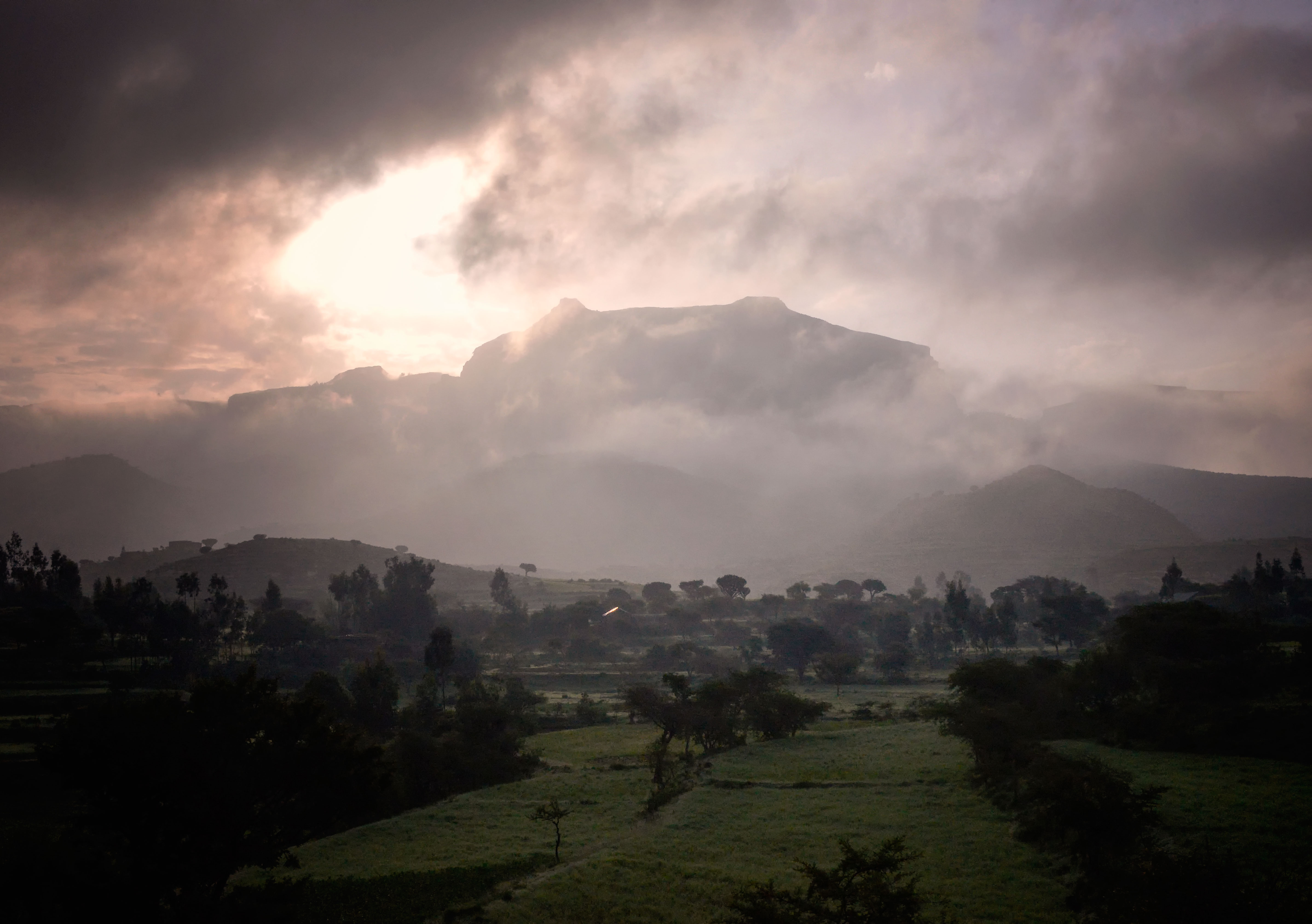

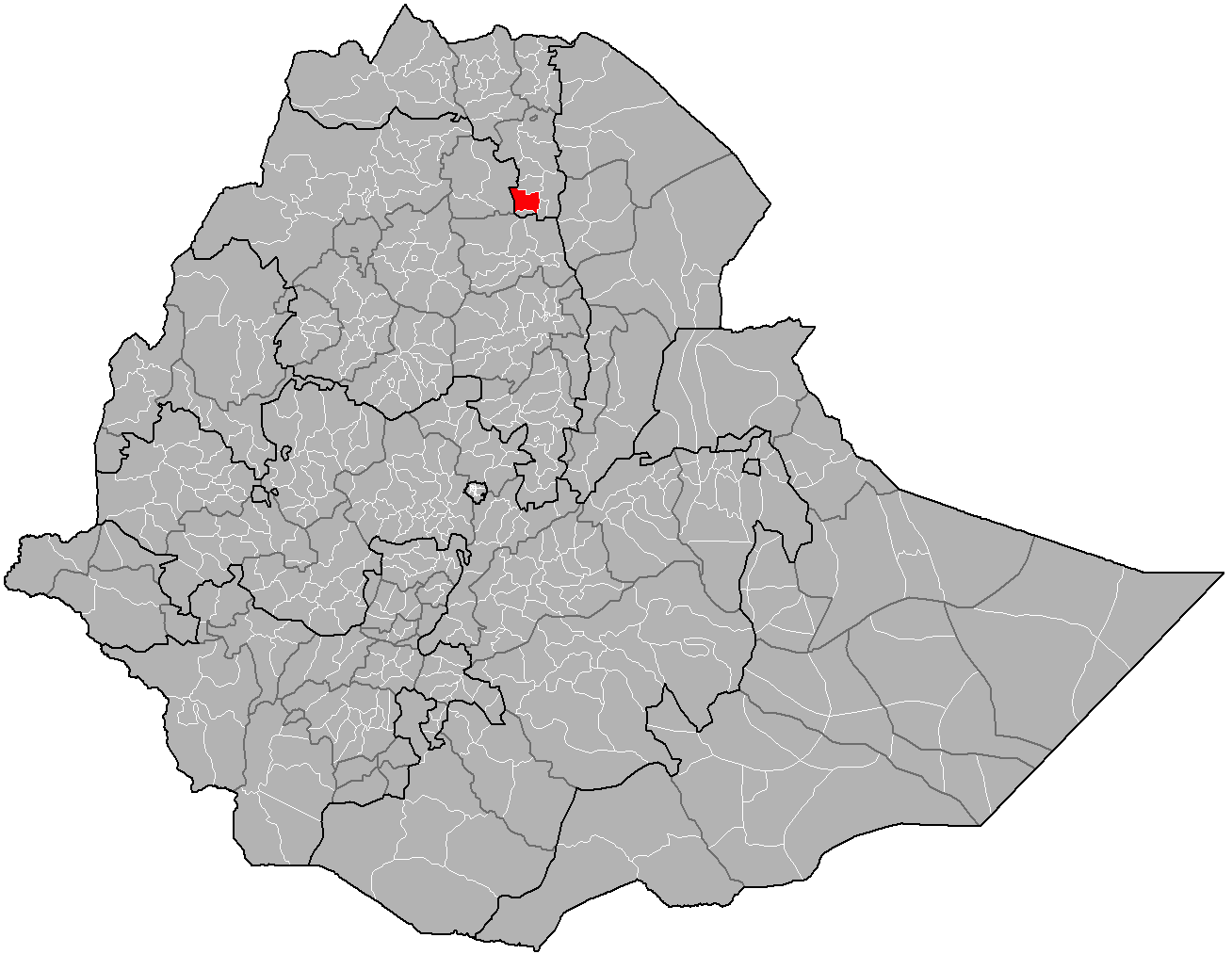
- Country: Ethiopia
- Region: Tigray
- Zone: Debubawi (Southern)

Area
  - Total: 1,019.76 km^{2} (393.73 sq mi)

Population (2007)
  - Total: 126,889

Ofla (Tigrinya: ኦፍላ) is one of the Districts of Ethiopia, or woredas, in the Tigray Region of Ethiopia. Part of the Debubawi Zone, Ofla is bordered on the south by Alamata, on the west by the Amhara Region, on the north by Endamehoni, and on the east by Raya Azebo. Small towns in Ofla include Zata, Sesela and Zikuya. The town of Korem is surrounded by Ofla woreda.

== Overview ==
Within the boundaries of this woreda is Lake Ashenge, where Christopher da Gama was defeated in the Battle of Wofla in 1543, and afterwards captured then killed by Imam Ahmad Gragn. Wofla was briefly governed by Abu Bakr Qecchin of Adal in the sixteenth century.

Another local landmark is Hugumburda State Forest, which contains the highest portion of an extensive area of indigenous coniferous forest.

Construction began by March 2009 on six health stations in this woreda which would extend health service coverage to six kebeles and benefit 150,000 inhabitants in and near the woreda. The budget for this construction, set at seven million Birr, was provided by the Ethiopian Federal government and the woreda administration.

== Demographics ==
Based on the 2007 national census conducted by the Central Statistical Agency of Ethiopia (CSA), this woreda has a total population of 126,889, an increase of 17.94% over the 1994 census, of whom 62,278 are men and 64,611 women; no urban inhabitants were reported. With an area of 1,019.76 square kilometers, Ofla has a population density of 124.43, which is greater than the Zone average of 53.91 persons per square kilometer. A total of 29,571 households were counted in this woreda, resulting in an average of 4.29 persons to a household, and 28,717 housing units. 96.6% of the population said they were Orthodox Christians, and 3.38% were Muslim.

The 1994 national census reported a total population for this woreda of 124,484, of whom 60,735 were men and 63,749 were women; 17,152 or 13.78% of its population were urban dwellers. The three largest ethnic groups reported in Ofla were the Tigrayan (89.2%), the Agaw Kamyr (7.27%), and the Amhara (3.46%); all other ethnic groups made up 0.07% of the population. Tigrinya was spoken as a first language by 88.07%, 6.94% Kamyr, and 1.36% spoke Amharic; the remaining 3.63% spoke all other primary languages reported.

88.57% of the population practiced Ethiopian Orthodox Christianity, and 11.43% were Muslim. Concerning education, 9.11% of the population were considered literate, which is less than the Zone average of 15.71%; 11.43% of children aged 7–12 were in primary school; 3.85% of the children aged 13–14 were in junior secondary school; 1.92% of the inhabitants aged 15–18 were in senior secondary school. Concerning sanitary conditions, about 63.5% of the urban houses and 12% of all houses had access to safe drinking water at the time of the census; about 27% of the urban and 6% of the total had toilet facilities.

== 2020 Woreda Reorganisation ==
In 2020 woreda Ofla became inoperative and its territory belongs to the following new woredas:

- Ofla (new, smaller, woreda)
- Zata woreda
- Korem town
