= Timeline of Mekelle =

This is timeline of Mekelle, a city and capital of Tigray Region, Ethiopia.

== History ==
- 13th century – Mekelle believed to be evolved from hamlet called Enda Meskel, later Medhane Alem, becoming a town by the early 19th century, when Ras Wolde Selassie of Enderta made Antalo his seat power.
- 1882–84 – the grand palace of Yohannes IV was built by Tigrayan engineer Engedashet Kassa Sehul and forms the historic center of Mekelle.
- 1871 – a church at Debre Gennet Medhane Alem, built after the return from Raya Azebo campaign.
- 1880s – Mekelle became the capital of the Ethiopian Empire, and urbanized rapidly.
- 1895–1896 – Mekelle was invited for conflict of the First Italo-Ethiopian War.
- October 1895 – the Italian army established their fort near the Enda Eyesus Church.
- January 1896 – the Italians surrendered; Menelik II allowed them to retreat their stronghold Adigrat.
- 1920s and 1930s – Mekelle emerged as a major trade center.
- 8 November 1935 – the Italians invaded Mekelle, contributed considerably to its modernization.
- 1938 – two shops opened, two Italian restaurant and Hotel Amba Aradam with four rooms.
- May 1943 – Mekelle was the epicentre of Woyane rebellion against the weak Haile Selassie government. From September–October, the British conducted air bombardment caused heavy damage.
- 1942–74 – the third phase urbanization took place.
- 1942 – Mekelle municipality was founded.
- 1962 – Master plan for Mekelle issued.
- 1983–1985 – the 1983–1985 famine ravaged the city, causing 75,000 refugees with 20,000 more waiting to enter.
- February 1986 – The Tigray People's Liberation Front (TPLF) released 1,800 political prisoners from Mekelle prison during the military action against the Derg.
- 25 February 1988 – series of offensives launched as TPLF fighters bypassed Mekelle but took control Maychew, Korem and another place along Dessie–Mekelle Road.
- June 1988 – The TPLF controlled Tigray except Mekelle.
- 4 and 5 June 1988 – the Derg sacked villages around Mekelle, which included Addi Gera, Bahri, Goba Zena, Grarot, Issala and Rabea.
- 25 February 1989 – Mekelle was occupied by TPLF, after the government position in Tigray collapsed.
- 5 June 1998 – the Eritrean Air Force bombed Ayder School in Mekelle during the Eritrean–Ethiopian War killing twelve.
- 29 December 2002 – a riot was occurred between Ethiopian Orthodox and Adventist followers as Adventist prayer service being conducted in a stadium.
- 30 July 2008 – the United Nations Mission in Ethiopia and Eritrea (UNMEE) headquarters was established in Mekelle in 2000 and continued to the date.
- 17–28 November 2020 – Mekelle offensive took place by joint Ethiopian and Eritrean military forces during the Tigray War, including aerial bombardment.
- 20 December 2020 – witnesses from Mekelle stated that artillery shelling had taken place before 28 November.
- 28 June 2021, Mekelle was recaptured by Tigray Defense Force after evacuated by the federal government for several months.
