= Alamata (woreda) =

District in Tigray Region, Ethiopia

Coordinates: 12°20′N 39°30′E

Alamata ኣላማጣ
- Woreda
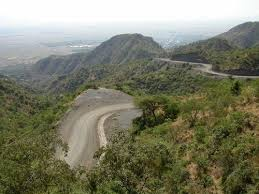

- Flag

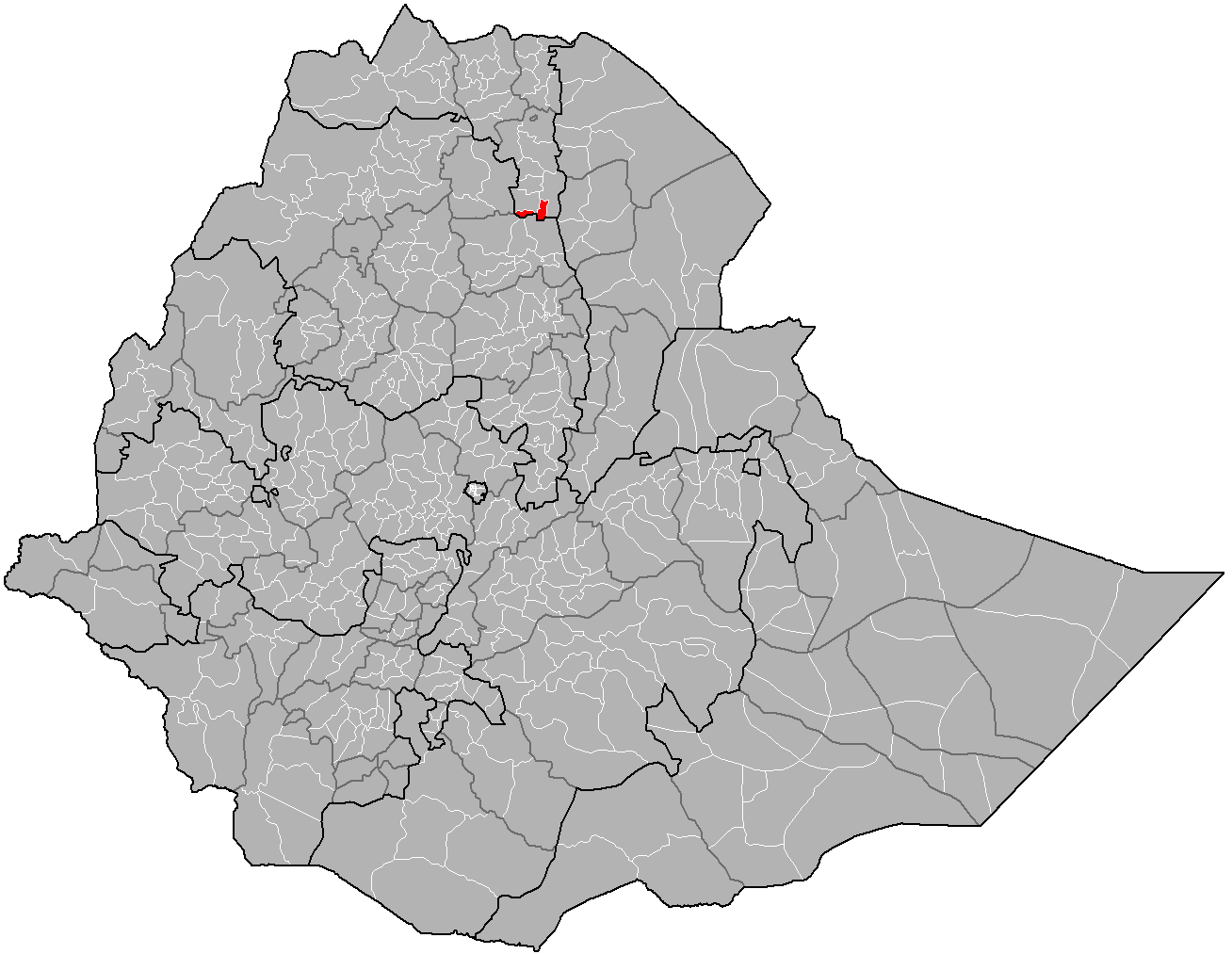
- Country: Ethiopia
- Region: Tigray
- Zone: Debubawi (Southern)

Area
  - Total: 1,952.14 km^{2} (753.73 sq mi)

Population (2007)
  - Total: 85,403

Alamata (Tigrinya: ኣላማጣ) is a woreda in Tigray Region, Ethiopia. Part of the Debubawi Zone, Alamata is bordered on the south and west by the Amhara Region, on the northwest by Ofla, and on the northeast by Raya Azebo. Towns in Alamata include Waja. The city of Alamata is a separate entity and is surrounded by Alamata woreda.

== Overview ==
Distinguished by small, undulating mountains with low vegetation cover, Alamata has an altitude which ranges between 1178 and 3148 meters above sea level, which drain into the Alamata Valley. Eight of the peasant associations are located in the Valley, while two are located in the intermediate highlands which have elevations ranging between 1500 and 3148 meters.

One micro-finance institution operates in Alamata, the Dedebit Credit and Saving Institution SC (DSCI), with three sub-branches: one at the administrative center, another at Waja, and the third at Merewa kebele. DSCI has about 10,000 customers here. There are 11 multipurpose cooperatives in this woreda, one for each kebele and the last located in Alamata; all but one have been organized and registered in accordance with the new cooperatives law, with about 3,541 members. In addition to these cooperatives, there are 4 saving and credit cooperatives, all of which are based in rural areas, and 2 construction cooperatives which are based in the urban areas.

This woreda was one of the about fifteen most important cotton production areas in Ethiopia in the 1950s, excluding Eritrea. A joint Ministry of Agriculture-ICA project to improve cotton production in the Alamata district happened in 1954-55. The zonal water, mining and energy department announced 15 August 2009 that 84 of the 100 wells planned in Alamata and Raya Azebo woredas have been completed at a cost of 40 million Birr. These wells would assist in irrigating over 3,000 hectares of land and benefit over 13,000 farmers.

== Demographics ==
The population comprises several ethnic groups: (1) Tigrayans, occupying the major part of the woreda, (2) Oromo form an ancient population group in the Raya graben that has been partly assimilated to the surrounding Amhara – the language is not anymore used on a daily basis; they live in dispersed villages across the wider area between Alamata, Mohoni and Chercher, (3) Afar share settlements on the mountains east of Raya, (4), generally living south of the Gobu River. In major towns along the main road, Amharic is frequently used as trade language.

The Tigraians and assimilated Oromos on the escarpments and in the Raya graben are mainly engaged in smallholder agriculture, often using spate irrigation with floods from the escarpment. In recent years they have started dry season irrigation agriculture, stimulated by government-established groundwater pumps and by mimicking commercial farms that have been attracted. Settlements are mainly along roads and iron roofed. Amhara and Tigraians are dominantly Orthodox Christians, though some villages follow Islam, such as some villages in the Raya graben bottom. The nearby Afar pastoralists practice transhumance, during drought periods, to remote areas, especially to the escarpment and highlands of Region Amhara. Movements to the Tigray uplands allow the Afar pastoralists to herd their livestock on denser vegetation as well as on standing stubble of croplands.

Based on the 2007 national census conducted by the Central Statistical Agency of Ethiopia (CSA), this woreda has a total population of 85,403, an increase of 26.56% over the 1994 census, of whom 42,483 are men and 42,920 women; 4,563 or 5.34% are urban inhabitants. With an area of 1,952.14 square kilometers, Alamata has a population density of 43.75, which is less than the Zone average of 53.91 persons per square kilometer. A total of 20,532 households were counted in this woreda, resulting in an average of 4.16 persons to a household, and 20,107 housing units. 80.27% of the population said they were Orthodox Christians, and 19.68% were Muslim.

Ethnic Groups of Alamata in 1994 [6]
1. Tigrayan (62.2%)
2. Amhara (33.9%)
3. Oromo (2.24%)
4. Other (1.66%)

The 1994 national census reported a total population for this woreda of 93,659 of whom 45,521 were men and 48,138 were women; 32,229 or 34.41% of its population were urban dwellers. The three largest ethnic groups reported in Alamata were the Tigrayans (62.19%), the Amhara (33.9%), and the Oromo (2.24%); all other ethnic groups made up 1.66% of the population. Tigrinya was spoken as a first language by 61.36%, 36.48% Amharic, and 1.36% spoke Oromo; the remaining 0.8% spoke all other primary languages reported. 78.35% of the population practiced Ethiopian Orthodox Christianity, and 21.45% were Muslim. Concerning education, 14.76% of the population were considered literate, which is less than the Zone average of 15.71%; 20.65% of children aged 7–12 were in primary school; 3.09% of the children aged 13–14 were in junior secondary school; 3.38% of the inhabitants aged 15–18 were in senior secondary school. Concerning sanitary conditions, about 91% of the urban houses and 43% of all houses had access to safe drinking water at the time of the census; about 31% of the urban and 12% of the total had toilet facilities.

== Agriculture ==
A sample enumeration performed by the CSA in 2001 interviewed 18,422 farmers in this woreda, who held an average of 0.84 hectares of land. Of the 15,533 hectares of private land surveyed, 98.16% was in cultivation, 0.03% pasture, 0.5% fallow, 0.27% woodland, and 1.04% was devoted to other uses. For the land under cultivation in this woreda, 91.67% was planted in cereals like teff and sorghum—although barley is the dominant crop in higher elevations—5.54% was in pulses, 31 hectares in oilseeds, and 33 planted in vegetables. The area planted in fruit trees was 43 hectares, while none were planted in gesho. 61.26% of the farmers both raised crops and livestock, while 23.92% only grew crops and 14.82% only raised livestock. Land tenure in this woreda is distributed amongst 72.66% owning their land, and 27.25% renting; the number held in other forms of tenure is missing. Parthenium hysterophorus (or Congress weed) is reported to be an increasing threat to cereal production in Alamata, as well as in the adjacent woreda of Kobo in Amhara Region. Cash crops include field peas, faba beans, lentils, teff and peppers.
