= Yeebio Woldai =

Yeebio Woldai (Note: Also spelled Yebio Woldeai.) (Tigrinya: ይዒቦ ወልደኣይ, romanized: Yəʿibo Wäldäʾay) (fl. 1940s–1970s) was a Tigrayan nationalist intellectual, journalist, and chronicler of the 1943 Woyane rebellion. Unlike figures such as Hailemariam Reda, he did not lead troops in the field, but his writings and political commentary helped shape the memory and narrative of the Woyane rebellion, influencing later generations of Tigrayan activists and the TPLF.

== Early life and background ==
Yeebio Woldai was born in the Tigray highlands, likely during the early 20th century, into a society deeply shaped by imperial marginalization and the decline of local aristocratic influence following the reign of Yohannes IV. He received a relatively modern education for the region, learning to read and write in Amharic and Tigrinya, skills that were rare among rural Tigrayans at the time. This literacy and education positioned him as a potential intermediary between the rural population and political circles, enabling him to serve as an intellectual voice for regional grievances. By the early 1940s, Yeebio had become associated with circles critical of imperial centralization, expressing sympathy for the discontent of local peasants and provincial elites. The combination of heavy taxation, forced conscription, and the erosion of traditional autonomy in Tigray created a social environment ripe for unrest. His education and literacy gave him a unique role as a political commentator and chronicler, bridging the gap between oral rural society and the emerging semi‑urban literate environment in Tigray.

== Role in the 1943 Woyane Rebellion ==
Yeebio Woldai did not fight as a military commander, but he played a political and ideological role in the Woyane rebellion. He supported the rebel leaders, including Hailemariam Reda and Fitawrari Tesfay, by articulating the grievances of the movement and documenting its events. His contribution lay in framing the rebellion as a legitimate struggle for Tigrayan dignity and autonomy, countering the imperial narrative that depicted the uprising as mere banditry or local unrest. After the rebellion was suppressed in October 1943—following imperial campaigns supported by British air power—Yeebio managed to avoid the harshest punishments that were inflicted on field commanders like Hailemariam Reda or peasant leaders such as Blatta Endalkachew Tuku’e. Instead, he remained under informal surveillance by imperial authorities but continued to observe, document, and reflect on Tigrayan issues. His ability to survive politically reflected both his secondary, non‑military role and his value as a literate figure in a largely rural society.

== Later life and writings ==
Yeebio Woldai is remembered as the intellectual voice of Woyane I, complementing the military leadership of Hailemariam Reda and other commanders. His work demonstrates the power of historical memory and narrative in sustaining regional nationalism in Ethiopia. While Hailemariam became the popular hero of the rebellion, Yeebio became its historian and advocate, ensuring that the story of Woyane would survive in oral, written, and eventually political form. According to John Young, TPLF cadres in the 1970s and 1980s explicitly drew on the memory curated by Yeebio and other local intellectuals to legitimize their own insurgency, presenting themselves as heirs to the legacy of 1943. This continuity allowed the TPLF to embed its modern revolutionary project within a longer narrative of Tigrayan resistance, making Yeebio’s intellectual legacy a central, if less visible, pillar of modern Tigrayan nationalism.
