= Adwa massacres =

2022 massacre in Ethiopia

- Part of Tigray war
- Location: Mariam Shewito, Endebagerima, Kumro, Rahiya, Mindibdib, Adi Chiwa, Geria, Adi Bechi, Kifdimet, and wilderness near Adwa, Tigray Region, Ethiopia
- Date: October 25–31, 2022
- Target: Civilians
- Deaths: 300+: 143 in Mariam Shewito; 80+ in Endabagerima; 35-40 in Kumro; 48 in Geria; Unknown number in other villages
- Perpetrator: Eritrean Defence Forces

The Adwa massacres, also referred to as the Mariam Shewito massacre, occurred between October 25 and 31, 2022, when soldiers from the Eritrean Defence Forces (EDF) massacred at least 300 civilians in villages near Adwa, Tigray Region, Ethiopia, during their campaign to seize the region from TPLF rebels.

== Background ==
During the Tigray war, which began in late 2020 after tensions between the separatist Tigray People's Liberation Front and Ethiopian president Abiy Ahmed boiled over, Adwa and other areas of western Tigray region became a hotspot of violence between the TPLF and the Ethiopian government. In November 2020, less than a month after the start of the war, Ethiopian troops captured Adwa. Eritrean troops became involved in the war by 2021, and in April 2021 three civilians were killed and 19 were injured in an Eritrean massacre in Adwa.

On 14 September 2022, Eritrean and Ethiopian forces launched a joint offensive into southern and northern Tigray, attacking the cities of Adigrat and Shire, and capturing Alamata and Korem just days into the offensive. These joint offensives came at the cusp of a breakthrough in peace talks between Eritrea, Ethiopia, and the TPLF. On October 18, Eritrean troops massacred at least 26 civilians in the town of Semema, and later massacred 65 civilians in Enine in central Tigray.

== Massacres ==
Adwa was recaptured in the last week of October 2022, by ENDF troops, Eritrean troops, Amhara regional forces, and the pro-government Amhara Fano militia. These troops arrived in Adwa and nearby villages on October 25. According to witnesses, fighting had been ongoing in the mountainous terrain near the village of Mariam Shewito in the days leading up to October 25. Tigrayan forces had inflicted heavy losses on the Ethiopian-led alliance before retreating, and Eritrean troops were the first to arrive in the area. These soldiers were angry about losing the battle, and began killing civilians as soon as they entered villages near Adwa. Eritrean troops blocked off the road leading out of Adwa once they captured it.

The first reported casualty of the massacres was 92-year-old Gebremariam Niguse in the village of Mariam Shewito. Niguse's house was the first house reached by the Eritreans, and they shot him and six of his relatives including a 5-month-old baby. The Eritreans later went house-to-house in Mariam Shewito over the next three days, killing anyone they saw. While some men were killed with their families, others were tied up and taken to a mountain named Gobo Soboria, where they were shot. Satellite imagery on October 27 shows Eritrean vehicles less than three miles away from Mariam Shewito.

More than 50 people were killed at the Mariam Shewito church, and satellite imagery on November 1 showed that the church was burnt down. At least 67 structures in Mariam Shewito were destroyed, and survivors testified that the Eritrean troops looted and destroyed houses after killing the residents. Survivors said that when the men were being led onto mountains before being killed, the Eritreans accused the victims of being part of the Tigray Defense Forces (TDF) and supplying food to the TDF. The Eritreans were identifiable as distinct from the Ethiopians because they spoke fluent Tigrinya.

After October 28, the Eritreans entered nine other villages and began killing the populace there as well. The villages attacked were Endabagerima, Geria, Adi Bechi, Adi Chiwa, Mindibdib, Kifdimet, and Kumro. In the village of Endabagerima, several members of a family were killed by and their bodies dumped in a storm drain by the Eritreans. Many residents fled their homes and did not return until after the Eritreans left on November 1.

== Aftermath ==
=== Casualties ===
The Adwa town administration reported at least 300 civilians were killed in the massacres, which lasted from October 25 to 31. Satellite imagery reviewed by The Washington Post identified 40 different locations around Mariam Shewito and other towns that were the site of possible mass graves and killings. At least 150 residents killed during the massacres were buried at Abune Limanos church near Kumro on November 16. Other survivors say that bones and clothing from massacred civilians can be seen everywhere in the mountains around Mariam Shewito, and new bodies were still being found months later.

Residents compiled different tallies of those killed during the massacre; one survivor listed 91 bodies around Mariam Shewito alone, and another listed 143 residents of Mariam Shewito who were killed or went missing. In Kumro, between 35 and 40 residents were massacred, many when they were hiding from the Eritreans. In Rahiya, three civilians were killed; a teacher and her two children. At least 80 people were killed in Endebagerima according to a local official, many who attending a local monastery from out-of-town - no one knew their names. Two lists provided by survivors reported 48 people killed in Geria.

=== Eritrean reaction ===
Eritrean troops had banned residents from burying their relatives while they remained in the area. A high-ranking Eritrean official told a survivor that the villagers had attacked them first, and instructed the villager not to bury her family on the church. When asked by Deutsche Welle about the massacres, Eritrean foreign minister Yemane Gebremeskel referred the newspaper to a statement made by the Eritrean embassy in the US, which said that the Eritrean government "vehemently rejects the false allegations made against Eritrea and it's disciplined army". The statement also accused the Washington Post investigations as being fake.

=== Presence ===
The massacres around Adwa occurred in the days before the signing of the Pretoria agreement on November 2, which ended the Tigray war. Eritrean troops remained in the area of Adwa and Mariam Shewito until November 1, but held a presence around these towns until they began their full departure on January 18, 2023. Whether or not these troops fully departed from Adwa and Mariam Shewito is unknown, although international observers reported that Eritrean troops remained in several areas of Tigray through 2024.

Many of the massacres were not discovered by international media until January 2023, when the Eritrean troops had left the area and journalists could interview the survivors.
