= Waja (disambiguation) =

Waja is a town in northern Ethiopia, also known as Waja Temuga.

Waja may refer to:

- Waja language, a Savannas language of Nigeria
- Proton Waja, a car model
- Arso Airport (ICAO: WAJA), Indonesia
- WAJA-LP (102.5 FM), a radio station licensed to serve Rocky Mount, North Carolina, United States
