= Endamekoni =

Coordinates: 12°45′N 39°30′E

Endamekoni ዐንዳመኮኒ
- Woreda
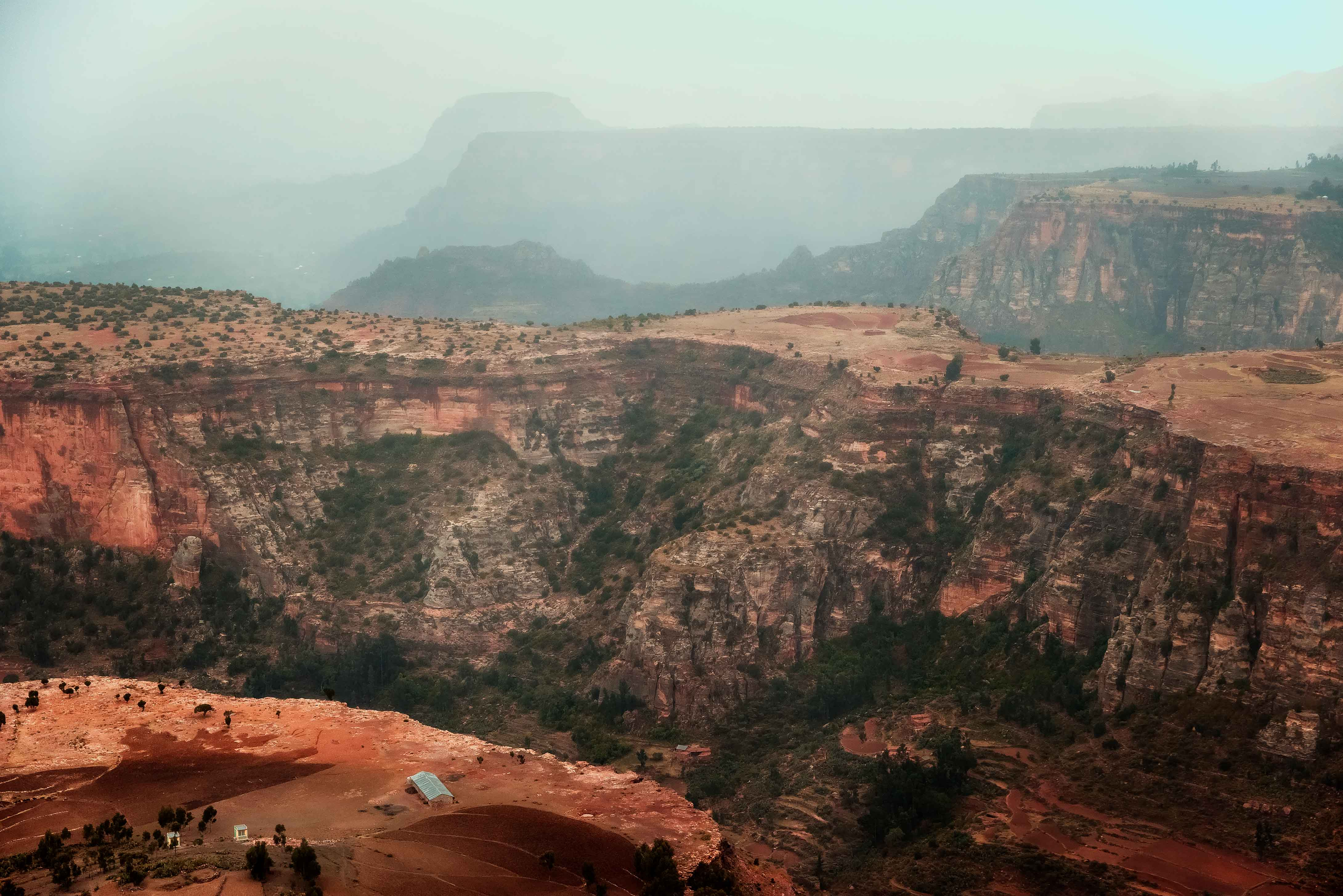

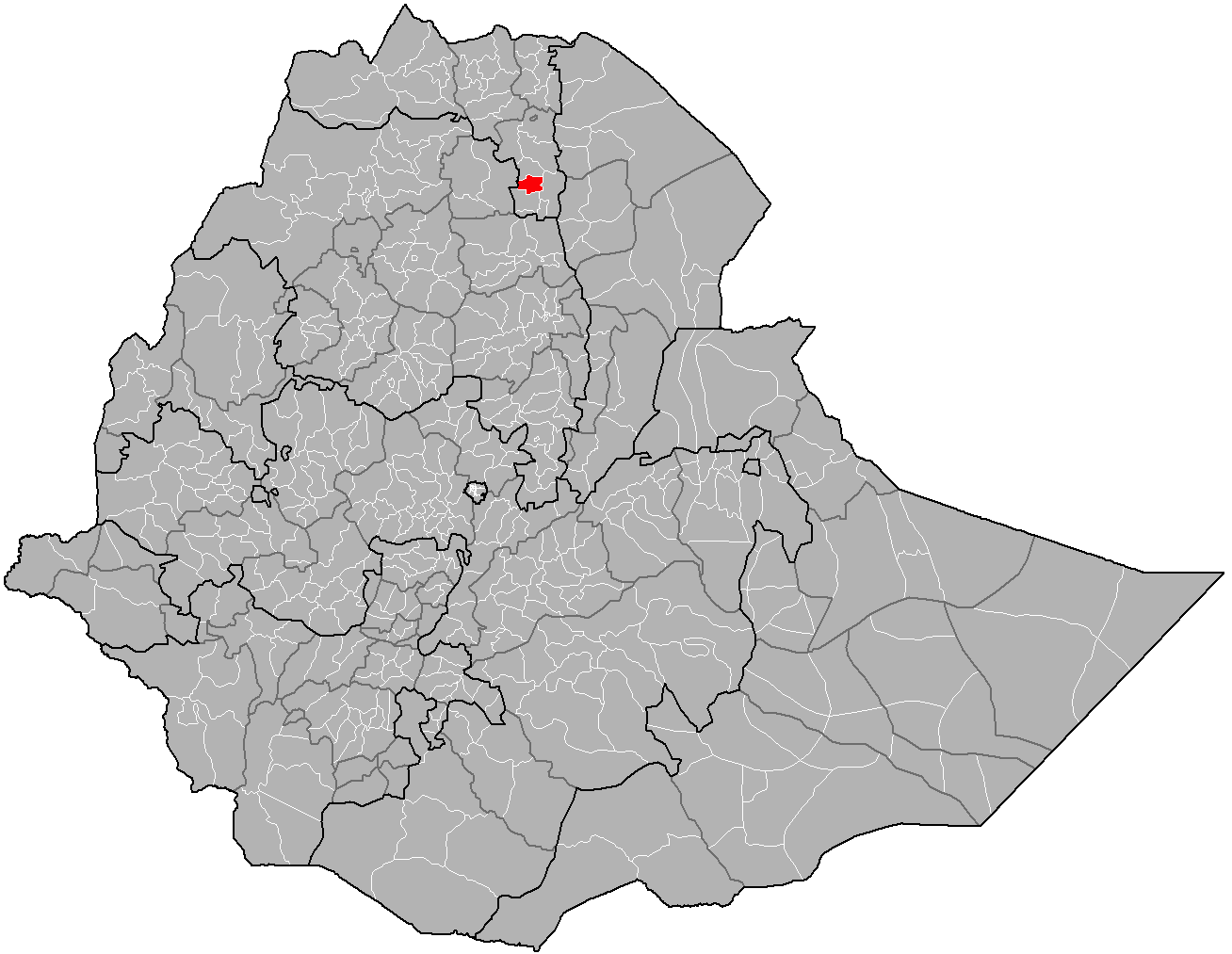
- Country: Ethiopia
- Region: Tigray
- Zone: Debubawi (Southern)

Area
  - Total: 2,287.71 km^{2} (883.29 sq mi)

Population (2007)
  - Total: 81,657

Endamekoni (Tigrinya: እንዳመኾኒ) (also transliterated as Enda Mohoni) is one of the Districts of Ethiopia, or woredas, in the Tigray Region of Ethiopia. Part of the Debubawi Zone, Endamehoni is bordered on the south by Ofla, on the west by the Amhara Region, on the north by Alaje, and on the east by Raya Azebo. Towns in Endamehoni include Wedisemro. The town of Maychew is surrounded by Endamehoni.

A baseline survey released in December 2011 stated the following facts about the Endamehoni. The main rivers of this woreda are Gereb Ayni, Hara, Nai Muq, Awdey, and Mai Chumachil. Agriculture is the mainstay of the economy in the woreda. Communication services include one post office, automatic and mobile telephones, and internet access in the woreda capital, supplemented with 18 satellite telephones in the rural portion. The woreda capital has 24-hour electric service from hydropower source of energy, while two towns and two rural subdivisions have electric service from the national hydropower grid. Public transport provides access to the woreda capital. Dedebit Credit and Saving Institution SC is the main micro finance institution in Endamehoni.

== Demographics ==
Based on the 2007 national census conducted by the Central Statistical Agency of Ethiopia (CSA), this woreda has a total population of 84,739, an increase of 36.90% over the 1994 census, of whom 42,052 are men and 42,687 women; 2,986 or 3.52% are urban inhabitants. With an area of 2,287.71 square kilometers, Endamehoni has a population density of 37.04, which is less than the Zone average of 53.91 persons per square kilometer. A total of 18,816 households were counted in this woreda, resulting in an average of 4.50 persons to a household, and 18,371 housing units. 93.63% of the population said they were Orthodox Christians, and 6.36% were Muslim.

The 1994 national census reported a total population for this woreda of 81,657, of whom 39,070 were men and 42,587 were women; 20,368 or 24.94% of its population were urban dwellers. The two largest ethnic groups reported in Endamehoni were the Tigrayan (97.92%), and the Amhara (1.1%); all other ethnic groups made up 0.98% of the population. Tigrinya was spoken as a first language by 97.87%, and 1.43% spoke Amharic; the remaining 0.7% spoke all other primary languages reported. 97.23% of the population practiced Ethiopian Orthodox Christianity, and 2.69% were Muslim. Concerning education, 18.78% of the population were considered literate, which is more than the Zone average of 15.71%; 28.35% of children aged 7–12 were in primary school; 4.95% of the children aged 13–14 were in junior secondary school; 5.53% of the inhabitants aged 15–18 were in senior secondary school. Concerning sanitary conditions, about 90% of the urban houses and 31% of all houses had access to safe drinking water at the time of the census; about 49% of the urban and 15% of the total had toilet facilities.

== Agriculture ==
A sample enumeration performed by the CSA in 2001 interviewed 17,400 farmers in this woreda, who held an average of 0.44 hectares of land. Of the 7,658 hectares of private land surveyed, 91.1% was in cultivation, 0.34% pasture, 2.79% fallow, 0.61% woodland, and 5.14% was devoted to other uses. For the land under cultivation in this woreda, 64.73% was planted in cereals, 23.77% in pulses, 35 hectares in oilseeds, and 8 in vegetables. The area planted in gesho was 54 hectares; the area planted in fruit trees is missing. 65.43% of the farmers both raised crops and livestock, while 32.51% only grew crops and 2.07% only raised livestock. Land tenure in this woreda is distributed amongst 89.07% owning their land, and 10.19% renting; the number held in other forms of tenure is missing.

== 2020 woreda reorganisation ==
In 2020, woreda Indamekhoni became inoperative and its territory belongs to the following new woredas:

- Indamekhoni (new, smaller, woreda)
- Neqsege woreda
- Maychew town
