= Dela, Ethiopia =

Coordinates: 13°00′25″N 39°20′45″E

Dela Dala
- Flag

- Location within Ethiopia
- Country: Ethiopia
- Region: Tigray
- Zone: Debubawi Zone
- Woreda: Alaje
- Time zone: UTC+3 (EAT)

Dela or Dala is a town in southern Tigray, Ethiopia. It is one of the larger towns in the Alaje district. Historically, Dela was the administrative and capital city of Bora-Selewa woreda, which was part of Enderta province, when Enderta was an independent province as well as an awraja as recent as the late 1990s.

== History ==
Della was where the Italian aggression dominance was defeated basically at the nearby mountain known as "Emba Alaje" during the second invasion in 1941. It was also the last hiding place of King "Lij Eyasu", niece of Emperor II Minilik, until his own servant leaked and exposed him to Haile Selassie during the first quarter of the 20th century. It is a place where the previous dictatorial military regime of Ethiopia, Derg, never fully controlled. In line with that opportunity, a number of residents have been part of the struggle to overthrow the regime with Ethiopian Peoples Democratic Front (EPRDF).
