= Battle of Shire (2022) =

2022 battle in the Tigray War

- Part of the Tigray War
Date	14–18 October 2022
Location	Shire, Tigray Region, Ethiopia
Result	Ethiopian victory

Belligerents
Ethiopia; Eritrea	Tigray People's Liberation Front

Units involved
Total: 112,500–147,500; 87,500; 25,000–60,000	200,000

Casualties and losses
- Unknown, likely hundreds

Between 14–18 October 2022, Ethiopian troops aided by Eritrean forces launched an offensive into Shire, in the separatist Tigray region. While Shire had been at the forefront of the conflict since 2020, the October 2022 offensive towards the town solidified Ethiopian and Eritrean control over it, and was the last major battle before peace negotiations began that November.

== Prelude ==
During the Tigray War, which began in late 2020 after tensions between the separatist Tigray People's Liberation Front and Ethiopian president Abiy Ahmed boiled over, Shire became one of the hotspots of violence. Hundreds of thousands of refugees fled to Shire, and famine, shelling, and several battles took place in the town. Prior to the war, the population of Shire was around 100,000, but it increased by 60,000 people due to displaced refugees throughout the war. On 14 September 2022, Eritrean and Ethiopian forces launched a joint offensive into southern and northern Tigray, attacking the cities of Adigrat and Adwa, and capturing Alamata and Korem just days into the offensive. These joint offensives came at the cusp of a breakthrough in peace talks between Eritrea, Ethiopia, and the TPLF.

== Battle ==
The battle of Shire began on 14 October, after Ethiopian forces launched a localized offensive towards the town. Aid workers operating in the city had no time to escape, being caught in the crossfire. One aid worker with the International Rescue Committee was killed in the battle on 15 October. In the attack, another aid worker was injured, along with two civilians killed and three injured. Shelling throughout the city killed dozens, with one resident interviewed by the BBC claiming hyenas ate the bodies of killed civilians. Analysts claimed that during the battle, Ethiopian troops used human wave tactics backed by Eritrean armor. At the time, little was known about the joint offensive and the situation in Shire as communications blackouts were in progress across north and south Tigray. On 17 October, Ethiopian troops captured the Shire airport, and Eritrean soldiers entered a camp for displaced refugees.

During the offensive, locals in central Tigray region claimed trucks filled with wounded civilians and soldiers were coming from the frontlines into TPLF-controlled areas. United Nations Security Chief Samantha Power stated that Ethiopian troops were launching "indiscriminate attacks" on the town during the battle. In addition, Tigrayan sources claimed many Ethiopian airstrikes were not against military targets. On 18 October, the TPLF admitted that their forces had left Shire, corroborating Ethiopian reports declaring victory in the city. Following its capture, Ethiopian troops headed towards Adwa and Axum. By October 23, Ethiopian and Eritrean troops would also capture Adwa and Axum as Tigrayan forces continued to retreat after suffering "major losses," an aid worker in Adwa told The Associated Press.

== Aftermath ==
=== Immediate aftermath ===
Locals in Shire claimed that immediately after the capture of the town, the entire population was starving, including aid workers and humanitarian assistance. Eritrean soldiers began looting parts of the city, sending captured loot back home to Eritrea on camels. Eritrean troops began searching United Nations offices in the town, but it was unclear what they were looking for. Eritrean soldiers also began looting vehicles and warehouses of the World Food Programme. Residents of Shire immediately began leaving the town after its capture, fearing reprisals and killings from Ethiopian and Eritrean soldiers.

Analysts claimed the capture of Shire by Ethiopian forces would force Tigrayan troops to opt towards guerrilla warfare. Secretary-General of the United Nations António Guterres urged a return to peace talks after reports of the atrocities emerged following the offensive. Amnesty International stated that the return of Shire to Ethiopian and Eritrean control would endanger residents and almost surely cause further war crimes. World Health Organization chairman Tedros Adhanom Ghebreyesus, a Tigrayan native, warned that Ethiopian forces were carpet-bombing whole cities in the region.

Six days after the capture of Shire, Ethiopian and Eritrean forces captured Adwa and Axum.

=== Post-truce ===
The success of the Ethiopian forces in Shire opened negotiations a second time, with a peace deal being signed ending the Tigray War on 2 November. From 17–23 November alone, Eritrean forces killed 111 civilians in Eritrean-controlled areas of Tigray region, and over 200 horses were destroyed, including in Shire. On 1 December, Ethiopian and Tigrayan diplomats met in Shire to discuss the disarmament of Tigrayan fighters and reconstruction of the region. Electricity returned to Shire on or before 7 December. Shire residents interviewed by PBS stated that there were two separate detention centers run by Eritrean forces following the battle, and that at one point "more than 300" youths were rounded up and sent to one.

On 30 December, the first reports emerged of Eritrean troops leaving Shire, as one of the stipulations for the peace treaty. Satellite images showed further withdrawals of Eritrean troops from Shire in January, with slogans like "Game Over" attached to their buses. However, Shire was only one of the first places to be vacated of Eritrean troops. Some residents claimed that while the majority of Ethiopian troops left on 20 January 2023, some stayed behind. An Ethiopian government statement claimed Amhara special forces, mainly the Fano, also began leaving Shire in January. This could not be independently confirmed at the time, however.
