= Bora massacre =

Massacre in Bora, Southern Tigray as part of Tigray war

Coordinates: 12.89501°N 39.34152°E

- Part of Tigray War
- Location of Bora in Tigray (Ethiopia)
- Location: Bora (Tigrinya: ቦራ), Tigray Region, Ethiopia
- Date: 8 January 2021
- Target: Tigrayans
- Attack type: Mass killing; Ethnic cleansing
- Deaths: 187 civilians
- Perpetrator: (Ethiopia) Ethiopian National Defence Force

The Bora massacre was a mass extrajudicial killing that took place in Bora (Tigrinya: ቦራ) in the Tigray Region of Ethiopia during the Tigray War, on 8 January 2021, with aftermath killings that continued up to 10 January. Bora is the capital town of woreda Bora-Selewa, Southern zone of Tigray.

== Massacre ==
A skirmish occurred between the TDF and ENDF on the morning of 8 January in the Ajale mountains, about 16 kilometres northeast of Bora. After the fighting, soldiers descended upon Bora.

A massacre by the Ethiopian National Defense Force (ENDF) then took place, in which the ENDF killed from 70 to 170 civilians in Bora on 8-10 January 2021. Soldiers went house to house in Bora and carried out the executions. After the killing, the soldiers stopped families from taking their dead. Burials were only permitted two days later; one person buried 26 corpses in the graveyard of the Abune Aregawi Church. The executions mostly took the form of removing a man from his house, making him kneel, and shooting him in the head. In the aftermath, the killing spree reached nearby villages Adi Shegla, Chamela and Chelena.

A mother testified to the EHRC–OHCHR Tigray investigation that her son was executed in the 8 January massacre for being a suspected TPLF fighter.

== Perpetrators ==
Survivors interpreted the identity of the perpetrators as Ethiopian soldiers.

== Victims ==
The “Tigray: Atlas of the humanitarian situation” mentions 187 victims, of which 64 have been identified.

== Reactions ==
The "Tigray: Atlas of the humanitarian situation", that documented this massacre received international media attention, particularly with regard to its Annex A, which includes the Bora massacre.

Mulu Nega, the chief executive of Tigray's transitional government, and Daniel Bekele, head of the Ethiopian Human Rights Commission (EHRC), did not respond to LA Times' requests for comment. After months of denial by the Ethiopian authorities that massacres occurred in Tigray, the EHRC–OHCHR Tigray investigation was announced in March 2021, and published its report on 3 November 2021.
