= Waja =

Town in northern Ethiopia

Waja (also known as Waja Temuga) is a town in northern Ethiopia. Located in the Debubawi Zone of the Tigray Region, south of the city of Alamata, Waja has a latitude and longitude of 12°17′N 39°36′E with an elevation of 1471 meters above sea level. It is one of two towns in Alamata woreda.

Records at the Nordic Africa Institute website provide details of the primary school in 1968.

Based on figures from the Central Statistical Agency in 2005, Waja has an estimated total population of 11,020, of whom 5,373 are men and 5,647 are women. The 1994 census reported it had a total population of 6,050, of whom 2,732 were men and 3,318 were women.
