= Italian Expeditionary Force in Sinai and Palestine =

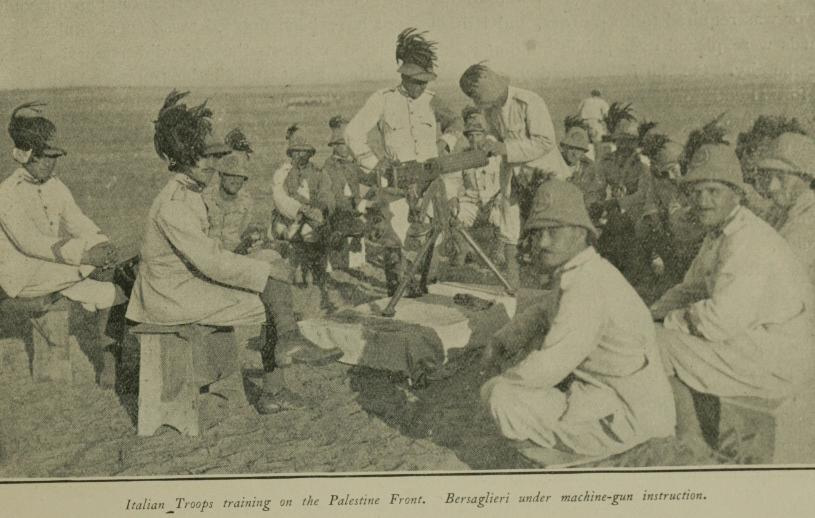
- Italian troops in Palestine
- Active: 1917–1919
- Country: Kingdom of Italy
- Branch: Royal Italian Army
- Size: 400
- Engagements: World War I; Sinai and Palestine campaign; Third Battle of Gaza

Commanders
- Notable commanders: Francesco D'Agostino; Gustavo Pesenti

The Italian Expeditionary Force in Sinai and Palestine was a military contingent of the Royal Italian Army sent to the Middle East during the Sinai and Palestine campaign and active from 1917 to 1919.

== History ==
In March 1917, the Italian government - having learned of the imminent departure for Palestine of a French contingent of three battalions - asked the War Office if it was possible to send an expeditionary force to cooperate in the Allied military operations in Syria and Palestine against the Turkish forces. The Italian diplomats were visibly irritated at having remained unaware of the Anglo-French agreement, and wanted to fully participate in the campaign to conquer the Holy Land and take part in the future reorganisation of the region. The manoeuvres of London and Paris, however, had not yet been finalized and were not limited to a narrow military cooperation, but were part of the Sykes–Picot Agreement, concluded on 16 May of the previous year. On Sonnino's instructions, the Italian ambassador in London, Imperiali, presented the proposal to send a military force to the English Secretary of State Balfour on 14 March. On 9 April 1917, the Foreign Office issued a response: the departure of a merely representative contingent, limited to a few hundred units, was permitted. London, therefore, could not refuse the proposal for Italian intervention, but at the same time wanted to avoid Rome's inclusion in the spheres of influence already defined with Paris. The Foreign Office was open to the contingent but reduced its contribution. According to other sources, however, it was the British authorities who made the request to the Italian ambassador for an Italian contingent equipped with cavalry, artillery, and air units to support General Archibald Murray's British army. After an initial refusal by General Luigi Cadorna, due to the need not to distract forces from the Austro-Hungarian front, it was decided to send a small contingent on the condition that the units were drawn from the colonies and not from metropolitan territory.

On 24 April, the Ministry of War of the Kingdom of Italy issued the confidential circular providing for the establishment of the Italian Detachment of Palestine. As a representation of the army, it consisted of three hundred Bersaglieri drawn from Italian Libya and one hundred Royal Carabinieri from Italy. Within a few days, the contingent of the force was formed, consisting of, in addition to the officers, three marshals, four brigadiers, six vice-brigadiers, two corporals, and eighty-five Carabinieri, sixty of whom were from the Cadet Legion, and was under the aegis of Captain Angelo Scalfi of the Bologna Legion. The Italian Palestine Detachment depended on the depot of the 1st Bersaglieri Regiment in Naples, while overall command was entrusted to Bersaglieri Major Francesco D'Agostino. According to initial plans, a group of five single-engine SAML S.2 aircraft from the 118th Reconnaissance Squadron was to be attached to the Detachment that summer. The unit would not be formed until September 1917 and was sent to Campo Formio, on the Italian-Austrian border, and not to the Middle East.

On May 6, 1917, the command set sail from Naples, arriving in Tripoli on the 10th. On the evening of May 13th, the Bersaglieri company and the pack train (forty-six quadrupeds) also embarked from the Libyan port. Two days later, the entire detachment set sail from Tripoli, making a brief stop in Tobruk on May 17th without disembarking.

== The landing ==
On May 19, the units landed at Port Said. In June, at the end of the training course, the Italian contingent was assigned to garrison the Rafah railway, where the 49th Indian Infantry Brigade of about a thousand men, an aircraft park, two anti-aircraft stations, an engineer park, an ammunition reserve, an Indian cavalry brigade, a battalion of the 101st Indian Grenadiers, and other British units were also stationed.

On November 7, 1917, General Allenby ordered the offensive on Gaza. A company of the Italian detachment also took part in the third battle of Gaza as part of the XX Composite Force, together with the Imperial Service Cavalry, the 20th Indian Infantry Brigade (Patiala-Gwalior and Alwar), and six companies of the French contingent. Italian troops successfully defended the Khan Yunis salient. The Turkish forces routed and hastily retreated, leaving Jerusalem to the Allies. On December 6, a unit composed of twenty-five Bersaglieri, twenty-five Carabinieri, and their two respective officers set out for the Holy City. Out of respect for the place, Allenby dismounted and entered on foot on the morning of December 11, accompanied by Commander D'Agostino (who had since been promoted to lieutenant colonel) and his French counterpart De Piépape. In the Holy City, the Royal Carabinieri were employed in guard duty and military police.

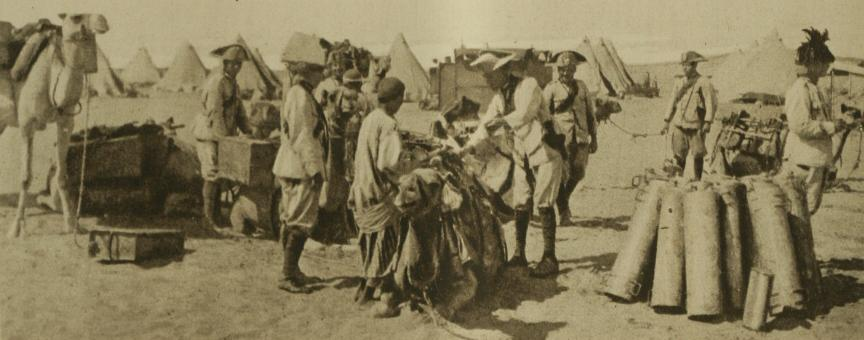
Royal Carabinieri in Palestine in 1918

At the end of the month, additional men arrived in Port Said to begin training. This was the newly formed "Palestine Hunters" Company, made up of one hundred and forty recruits drawn from the Italians residing in Egypt, mainly from Alexandria (in this case, too, General Diaz, like his predecessor, did not want to withdraw combat troops from the Austro-Hungarian border). Command was entrusted to Bersaglieri Captain Felice Mercuri, assisted by four other officers. In February 1918, the Italians were assigned to control the railway junction between Jaffa and Jerusalem. In the summer of the same year, D'Agostino was replaced by Alpine Lieutenant Colonel Gustavo Pesenti, who began to complain about the inactivity of the Italian forces, relegated to the rear.

In October 1918, Foreign Minister Sidney Sonnino announced his intention to send a brigade of 6,000 men to Palestine, officially called the Expeditionary Corps for Syria and Palestine. The contingent was not constituted in time because the Allied advance overwhelmed the remaining Turkish resistance, conquering Damascus and Aleppo, thus ending the war in that area.

== The retreat ==
At this point, the General Staff, in agreement with the government, decided - while maintaining the name Expeditionary Corps for Syria and Palestine - to change the objective of the expedition: Anatolia, to reclaim what had been promised to Italy in the San Giovanni di Mauriana Accords. A few days before the landing (scheduled for January 6, 1919), however, the government canceled the operation and the Corps was disbanded.

All Italian units in Palestine and Egypt, stationed in Port Said, Jaffa, and Sarona, returned to Italy in August 1919. In Palestine, only a nucleus of dismounted Carabinieri remained, which took the name of the Italian Carabinieri Detachment of Jerusalem. From August 1919 to February 1921, they performed military police duties, guarding the Italian consulate, guarding honor at the Holy Sepulchre, and acting as courier and messenger between Egypt, Palestine, and Syria. On March 1, 1921, the unit was repatriated and disbanded.
