= Hailemariam Reda =

Blatta Hailemariam Reda (Tigrinya: ሓይለ ማርያም ረዳ, romanized: Ḥaylä Māryām Räda), (5 July 1909 – 1 March 1995) was an Ethiopian rebel leader and local notable from Tigray. He is primarily remembered as the principal commander of the 1943 Woyane rebellion, which posed the most serious challenge to Haile Selassie’s authority in the early post‑occupation period, and later as a symbol of Tigrayan defiance against central Ethiopian rule. His life encompassed phases of rural banditry (shiftennet), collaboration and resistance during the Italian occupation, long imprisonment under the imperial regime, and late‑life involvement with the Derg militia in Tigray.

== Early life ==
Born on 5 July 1909 in Dandera, Enderta, approximately 17 km southeast of Mekelle, Hailemariam Reda came from a family with connections to both the peasantry and the local nobility. His father, Reda Gebru, descended from a peasant family but rose to local prominence as a Grazmach and provincial administrator serving Yohannes IV and his nephew Ras Mengesha Yohannes during the late 19th century. His mother, Bisrat Weldye, was the daughter of Dejjach Weldye who is a descendant of Kahsay Woldu, the brother of Dejazmach Sabagadis Woldu, the prominent Agame warlord of the early 19th century. As the youngest of eight children, Hailemariam received a traditional church education, mastering the Pauline epistles, the Acts of the Apostles and memorizing the Psalms, which he recited throughout his life. Local oral poetry celebrated him as “the Psalms reader” (Tigrinya: ዳዊት ዘርጋሂዬ, romanized: Dawit Zergahiye), reflecting his attachment to Orthodox Christian devotion.

In his youth, Hailemariam became involved in gaz raids against the Afar and gradually moved into shiftennet—a form of rural banditry that was common in Tigray during times of weak central control. Historians debate his early motives: some sources depict his shift to banditry as stemming from loss of hereditary local office and conflict with the provincial administration, while others see in it a mix of personal ambition and latent resentment of Shewan centralization.

== Italian occupation and early rebellion ==
During the Italian occupation of Ethiopia (1935–1941), Hailemariam’s activities reflected the ambivalence of many local leaders. Initially, he engaged in patriot resistance against the Italians, reportedly killing Italian soldiers and raiding convoys in the countryside. Later, however, he accepted the title Blatta and the position of chiqa shum (village chief) of Dandera under the Italians, allowing him to consolidate local influence and secure survival under colonial rule. This dual role as both early resister and eventual collaborator foreshadowed his pragmatic political style.

When the British and Ethiopian forces expelled the Italians and Emperor Haile Selassie returned to Addis Ababa in May 1941, Hailemariam’s appeals for recognition in the restored provincial hierarchy were ignored. He therefore resumed his shiftennet in late 1941, becoming one of the most prominent and feared bandits of eastern Tigray by 1943. His ability to protect local peasants from predatory officials and militia won him broad popular support in the countryside, laying the groundwork for the Woyane rebellion.

=== Leadership of the 1943 Woyane rebellion ===
Hailemariam Reda rose to historical prominence as the chief leader of the Woyane rebellion of 1943, the largest provincial revolt against Haile Selassie’s rule in the immediate post‑Italian period. Acting as the head of the abbo gerebs (peasant leaders’ assembly), he coordinated a coalition of disgruntled provincial nobles, rural militias, and thousands of armed peasants from the Raya, Azebo and Wajirat communities. The rebels launched a series of coordinated attacks in September 1943, capturing Quiha, Enda Yesus, and Mekelle, forcing government troops to retreat in disarray. Victories at Sergien, Ara, Wejerat, and Wukro demonstrated the tactical skill of the rebels and the extent of peasant mobilization.

The imperial government responded with overwhelming force. The governor of Tigray Ras Seyoum Mengesha was recalled to Addis Ababa under suspicion of complicity, and the government deployed a multi‑front campaign led by Generals Tedla Mekonnen and Isayas Gebreselassie, reinforced by British officers, aircraft, and armored vehicles. British bombers targeted rebel positions and marketplaces, demoralizing the peasantry. By October 1943, the revolt was decisively crushed, although Hailemariam and his followers retreated to the Afar lowlands and continued guerrilla warfare until 1946.

== Capture, exile, and later life ==
Hailemariam surrendered peacefully in 1946 under an oath of safe conduct but was sentenced to life imprisonment by Emperor Haile Selassie, who reportedly remarked that “we catch a hen with corn and an enemy with an oath.” He endured harsh solitary confinement in Gore (Illubabor) with chains and minimal rations before being transferred to long internal exile. Between 1946 and 1974, he spent roughly 28 years in confinement or monitored exile: first in Gore, then in Hamer Bako (Gamu Gofa), and later in Jinka, where he eventually gained limited freedom to farm and accumulate modest wealth.

The 1974 Ethiopian Revolution transformed Hailemariam into a celebrated anti‑imperial figure. He was invited to Addis Ababa University to recount the Woyane experience to students and was briefly appointed head of the Derg militia in Tigray (1975–1978), tasked with suppressing banditry and insurgency. During the rise of the TPLF, he was captured and released by insurgents, after which the Derg placed him under de facto house arrest in Mekelle and Jinka until the regime’s collapse in 1991.

After the EPRDF’s victory in 1991, Hailemariam enjoyed full freedom for the first time in decades. He gave interviews in Tigrinya media, including Wegahta, framing his life as dedicated to the Tigrayan cause and retrospectively interpreting the Woyane uprising as a step toward Tigrayan self‑assertion. He died on 1 March 1995, aged 85.

== Legacy ==
Hailemariam Reda’s legacy is contested. Supporters and later Tigrayan nationalist narratives portray him as a patriot and peasant leader, the symbol of the First Woyane, and an early precursor of TPLF‑era Tigrayan nationalism. Critics emphasize his pragmatic opportunism, noting his oscillation between banditry, collaboration, and rebellion, and suggest that his primary motive was local power rather than secessionist nationalism.

According to John Young, the Tigrayan People's Liberation Front deliberately invoked the memory of Hailemariam Reda and the 1943 Woyane rebellion to mobilize Tigrayan peasants during its own struggle (1975‑1991). By presenting itself as the continuation of Woyane, the TPLF created a powerful narrative of historical resistance that framed Hailemariam as the archetype of Tigrayan defiance. This linkage ensured that his figure, once peripheral in national Ethiopian history, became central to Tigray’s modern historical memory, by his embodiment of a long tension between peripheral resistance and imperial centralization in 20th‑century Ethiopia.
