= Battle of Shire =

Battle of Shire may refer to:

- Battle of Shire (1936) during the Second Italo-Ethiopian War
- Battle of Shire (1989) during the Ethiopian Civil War
- Battle of Shire (2022) during the Tigray War

== See also ==
- "The Scouring of the Shire", the penultimate chapter of The Lord of the Rings
