= Alaje =

Place in Tigray Region, Ethiopia

Coordinates: 13°00′N 39°20′E

Alaje ኣላጀ
- Woreda
- Flag

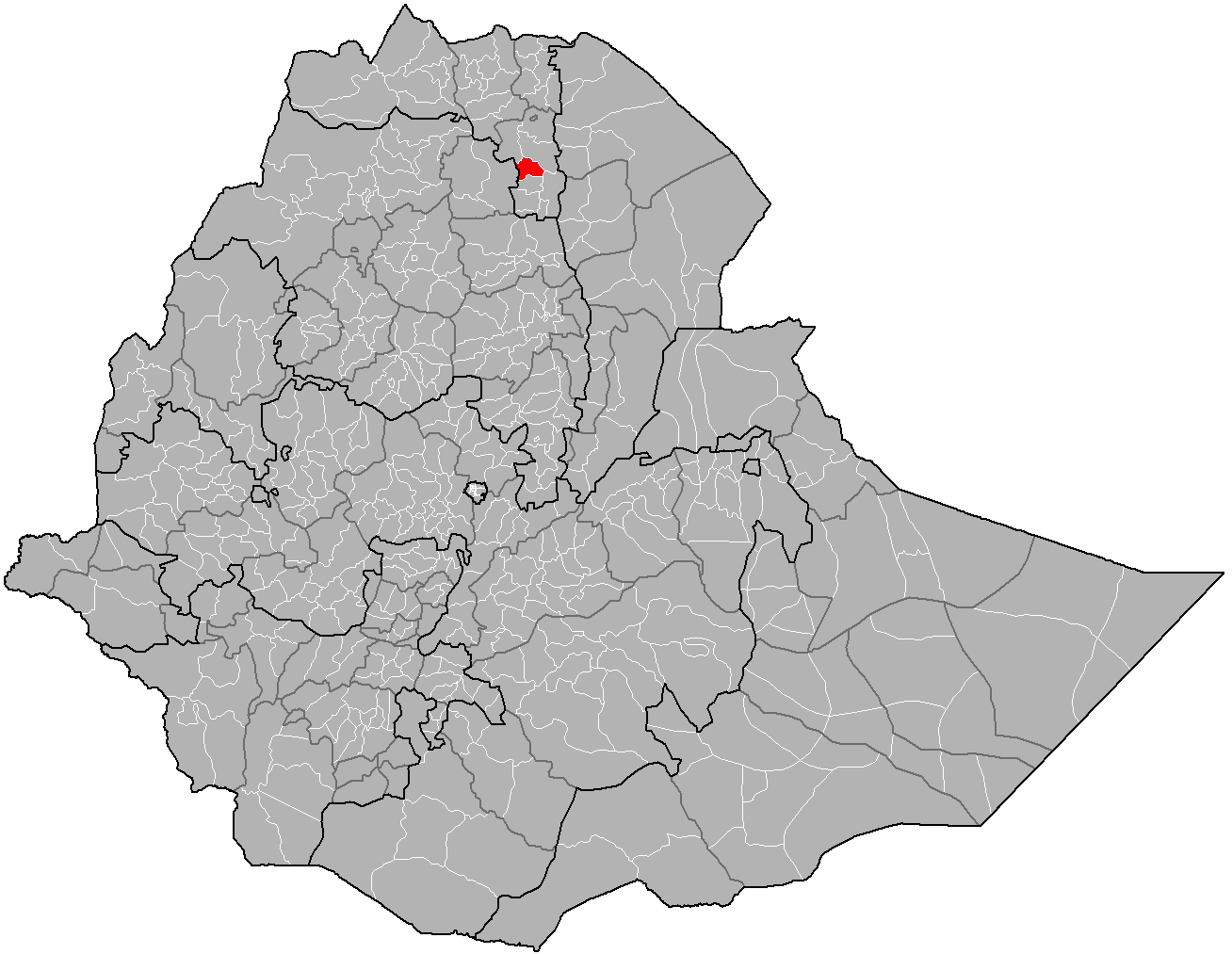
- Country: Ethiopia
- Region: Tigray
- Zone: Debubawi (Southern)

Area
  - Total: 1,677.94 km^{2} (647.86 sq mi)

Population (2007)
  - Total: 83,692

Alaje (Tigrinya: ኣላጀ) is a District of Ethiopia, or woreda, in the Tigray Region of Ethiopia. Part of the Debubawi Zone, Alaje is bordered on the south by Endamehoni, on the southwest by the Amhara Region, on the north by Debub Misraqawi (Southeastern) Zone, and on the southeast by Raya Azebo. The administrative center of this woreda is Adi Shehu; other towns in Alaje include Bora (also called Chelena) and Dela.

The highest point in this woreda, as well as the Debubawi Zone, is Mount Emba Alaje, one of the southernmost peaks of the Wajirat Mountains. This prominence was the scene of several battles. The Battle of Emba Alaje (1895) was a significant defeat of the Italians during the First Italo-Ethiopian War. A later battle in 1941 was one of the last actions of the East African Campaign, and ended with the capture of the Duke of Aosta, the governor of Italian East Africa, as well as one of the last Italian strongholds.

== Demographics ==
Based on the 2007 national census conducted by the Central Statistical Agency of Ethiopia (CSA), this woreda has a total population of 107,972, an increase of 29.01% over the 1994 census, of whom 52,844 are men and 55,128 women; 7,568 or 7.01% are urban inhabitants. With an area of 1,677.94 square kilometers, Alaje has a population density of 64.35, which is greater than the Zone average of 53.91 persons per square kilometer. A total of 24,784 households were counted in this woreda, resulting in an average of 4.36 persons to a household, and 23,952 housing units. The majority of the inhabitants said they practiced Ethiopian Orthodox Christianity, with 99.68% reporting that as their religion.

The 1994 national census reported a total population for this woreda of 83,692, of whom 40,766 were men and 42,926 were women; 6,302 or 7.53% of its population were urban dwellers. The two largest ethnic groups reported in Alaje were the Tigrayan (98.18%), and the Agaw Kamyr (1.4%); all other ethnic groups made up 0.42% of the population. Tigrinya was spoken as a first language by 98.78%, and 0.96% spoke Kamyr; the remaining 0.26% spoke all other primary languages reported. 99.5% of the population practiced Ethiopian Orthodox Christianity. Concerning education, 10.46% of the population were considered literate, which is less than the Zone average of 15.71%; 13.46% of children aged 7–12 were in primary school; 0.96% of the children aged 13–14 were in junior secondary school; 0.55% of the inhabitants aged 15–18 were in senior secondary school. Concerning sanitary conditions, about 23% of the urban houses and 13% of all houses had access to safe drinking water at the time of the census; about 14% of the urban and 4% of the total had toilet facilities.

== Agriculture ==
A sample enumeration performed by the CSA in 2001 interviewed 20,420 farmers in this woreda, who held an average of 0.5 hectares of land. Of the 10,110 hectares of private land surveyed, 92.87% was in cultivation, 0.28% pasture, 3.03% fallow, 0.24% woodland, and 3.59% was devoted to other uses. For the land under cultivation in this woreda, 65.39% was planted in cereals, 24.94% in pulses, and 51 hectares in oilseeds; the area planted in vegetables is missing. The area planted in fruit trees was 57 hectares, while 32 were planted in gesho. 65.36% of the farmers both raised crops and livestock, while 33.63% only grew crops and 1.0% only raised livestock. Land tenure in this woreda is distributed amongst 86.43% owning their land, and 10.73% renting; the number held in other forms of tenure is missing.

== 2020 woreda reorganisation ==
As of 2020, woreda Alaje became inoperative and its territory belongs to the following new woredas:

- Imba Alaje(new, smaller, woreda)
- Bora-Selewa woreda
