= Woyane rebellion =

1943 rebellion of Tigrayans against Haile Sellassie administration

Woyane rebellion ቀዳማይ ወያነ
- Location of Tigray (1943) in red. Eritrea was under British administration at the time
Date	May – November 1943
Location	Tigray Province, Ethiopia
Result	Ethiopian victory: Revolt suppressed

Belligerents
Ethiopia; United Kingdom	Woyane rebels

Commanders and leaders
(Ethiopian Empire) Haile Selassie (Ethiopian Empire) Abebe Aregai	Yeebio Woldai; Negusse Bezabih; Gugsa Mengesha; Hailemariam Reda

Casualties and losses
200 killed 375 wounded 33 missing	Several thousands

The Woyane rebellion (Tigrinya: ቀዳማይ ወያነ, romanized: k’edamay Weyane, lit. 'first Woyane') was an uprising in the Tigray Province, Ethiopia against the centralization process from the government of Emperor Haile Selassie which took place in May–November 1943. The rebels called themselves the Woyane, a name borrowed from a game played locally between competing groups of young men from different villages, which connoted a spirit of resistance and unity. After nearly succeeding in overrunning the whole province, the rebels were defeated with the support of aircraft from the United Kingdom's Royal Air Force. Out of all the rebellions that engulfed Ethiopia during Haile Selassie's rule, this was the most serious internal threat that he faced.

== Background ==
In an Imperial determination to weaken the power of the regional nobles and elites of Ethiopia, the Haile Selassie government in 1941 introduced a new regional administration. The law or edict provided for fourteen provinces, around 100 counties, and 600 districts. This then enabled Haile Sellasie to centralize his authority and in effect rendered these nobles with their administrations dependent on the central government. Historians agree that "the basic policy of Haile Sellasie was a centralizing one continuing the tradition of the great centralizing Emperors from 1855 onwards." The provision reduced the many provinces of Tigray into eight counties: Raya Azebo, Enderta, Tembien, Kilete Awla'lo, Agame, Adowa, Axum and Shiere along with many districts under each of the counties' jurisdictions. After the liberation of Ethiopia from Italian occupation first by the Ethiopian Patriots and consolidated with the arrival of the emperor and British forces in the East African Campaign in 1941, Ethiopia saw many rebellions break out in different parts of the empire.

The Woyane uprising in Tigray seems to have arisen when administrative corruption and greed ignited a situation of existing instability and insecurity, one awash with weaponry in the wake of the Italian defeat. Tigrayan regional particularism and pride primarily motivated the rebellion. Separatism as such played no part. The Tigrayan rebels considered themselves as good Ethiopians as the Shoans, whose domination they resented. In the rebellion, traditional conservative religious orthodoxy predominated and Muslims joined the Christians. The early history of Tigray is viewed as a source of pride by the Christians and Muslims alike since it embodies the common mythos of their existence beyond religion. It is seen as the force which held them together as a people of one origin long before Christianity or Islam were introduced. The rebellion was local. It drew on no outside inspiration, either material or ideological. It had a much longer-lasting effect than a supposed ethnopolitical movement due to a complex blend of social protest and resentful regionalism. In many ways, Woyane was an aborted class struggle and an aborted attempt at regional autonomy. One can immediately see that these are similar to the roots of the TPLF insurrection of the 1970s, which has at times been rightly called ‘‘a second Woyane.’’

=== Goals ===
Their proclamation after liberating Mekelle had five main points.

- Autonomous self-administration under Ethiopian flag and unity
- Administration by Tigrayan Customary laws
- Appointment of one's own leaders free of domination by Shoan Imperial elite
- Eradication of thieves and bandits
- Objection to payment of excessive taxation and payment to an appointee of the Emperor

=== Leadership ===
- H.E. Fitawrari Yeebio Woldai (Wedi Weldai), b. Samre-Enderta, Tigray. Chief leader and commander of the 1943 Woyane rebellion in Tigray
- H.E. Dejazamtch Negusse Bezabih, b. Da' Meskel-Mekelle, Enderta, Tigray. Top leader and commander of the 1943 Woyane rebellion in Tigray
- H.E. Bashay Gugsa Mengesha, b. Adi-Seleste, Hintalo-Enderta, Tigray. Top leader and commander of the 1943 Woyane rebellion in Tigray.
- H.E. Blatta Hailemariam Reda, b. Dandera-Enderta, Tigray. Commander of the 1943 Woyane rebellion in Tigray.

== Rebellion ==
In 1943, open resistance broke out all over southern and eastern Tigray under the slogan, "there is no government; let's organize and govern ourselves." Throughout Enderta districts including, Mekelle, Didibadergiajen, Hintalo, Saharti, Samre and Wajirat, Raya, Kilete-Awlaelo and Tembien, local assemblies, called "gerreb", were immediately formed. The gerreb sent representatives to a central congress, called the "shengo", which elected leadership and established a military command system.

The rebels established their headquarters at Wukro. During the rainy season of 1943, the rebels under the leadership of Fitawrari Yeebio Woldai and Dejazmach Neguise Bezabih, hailing from Enderta, which was the heart of the Woyane rebellion, were busy organizing their forces; and after celebrating the Ethiopian New Year on 12 September, they went on the besieged government garrison at Quiha. The highly equipped government forces were to meet with the poorly equipped but determined rebels' for the first time in the rebel's stronghold district of Didiba Dergiajen, Enderta in the village of Sergien; the rebels under Fitawrari Yeebio Woldai (Wedi Weldai) and Dej. Neguisie Bezabih defeated the government forces decisively; they captured countless modern weapons that helped them attract many peasants to join the rebellion, and many government soldiers deserted and joined the rebellion. In September 1943, on the government's second offensive in the village of Ara, also in Enderta, the Woyane rebels under Wedi Woldai scored yet a second victory over the heavily armed government forces; this time, however, the rebels captured high level feudal chiefs including and killed many prominent Tigray and Amhara warlords that sided with the Emperor Haile Selassie's government. The rebels under Bashay Gugsa Mengesha also captured General Essaias and many of his commanders and imperial soldiers at Quiha. The rebel forces estimated at 20,000, moved eastward from Quiha to Enda Yesus, a fort overlooking the provincial capital, Mekelle. They captured the fort and then took Mekelle. The representatives of Haile Selassie's government fled. The Woyane issued a proclamation to the inhabitants of Mekelle which stated, among other things: "Our governor is Jesus Christ... And our flag that of Ethiopia. Our religion is that of Yohannes IV. People of Tigray, follow the motto of Weyane."

A similar victory was achieved by the rebels under the top leaders of the Woyane movement namely Dejazmach Negussie Bezabih and Bashay Gugsa Mengesha again in the district of Hintalo and Wajerat in Enderta; the rebels defeated the heavily armed government forces numbering in thousands and aided by the Royal Air Force (RAF), and were able to capture and acquire yet again heavy modern armaments. By 20 September the successful Woyane rebel army was ready to turn south to face an Ethiopian force attempting to advance to Tigray. Haile Selassie had ordered his minister of war Ras Abebe Aregai, to take charge of the campaign against the rebels. The Ras rushed northward and arrived at Korem, south of Maichew, on 17 September but his way was blocked by rebels. During the next three weeks, the Weyane forces fought hard against Ras Abebe's Ethiopian troops, who were bolstered by a small contingent of British officer. The fighting centered on the great natural fortress of Amba Alagi. Basha Gugusa, one of the first Woyane leaders, led the battle of Amba Alagi in September 1943 to victory over the Imperial army which was well equipped and supported by RAF planes. The Woyane forces outnumbered those of the government, but their advantage in numbers was offset by artillery and RAF support.

The Woyane leaders precipitated the final decisive battle by launching a three-pronged attack on government positions with perhaps 10,000 men. The war is spread to Alaje in Raya, Wukro in Kilte Awlalo, and Tembien whereby the rebels mostly peasants beat the huge government forces equipped with tanks and modern weapons led by Ras Abebe Aregai, General Abebe Damtew, and aided by British Colonel Pluck. The total annihilation of government forces heavily supported by the RAF sent a signal to the Emperor, that "the Tigrayans weren't only brave fighters but also astute strategists" said Hailemariam when he gave an interview to Wegahta magazine. During the battle, Pluck was killed by a Woyane rebel. The inability to subdue the rebellion prompted the emperor to authorize an aerial bombardment by RAF bomber squadrons based in Aden which were able to operate a number of Bristol Blenheim's. On 6 October 1943, fourteen bombs and eight days later fifty-four bombs were dropped in the provincial capital Mekelle respectively. On 7 October, sixteen bombs and two days later thirty-two bombs were dropped in Corbetta Raya and Hintalo Enderta respectively as well, around 70 people were killed and 200 were wounded. Although the rebels scattered and battle formations began to disintegrate on 7 October, uncertainty still affected the Ethiopian government forces and Ras Abebe did not personally move out of Korem until 9 October. He then moved systematically northward and entered Quiha and Mekelle on 14 October, capturing the erstwhile rebel headquarters at Wokro on 17 October.

== Aftermath ==
Ras Abebe Aregai was appointed as governor of Tigray and was given authority with the pacification of that province. His pacification was brutal. The imperial army wreaked such havoc in Tigray that even the British officers were shocked and complained to their headquarters in Addis Ababa. The nature of the repression was to have a strong impact on future Tigray politics, particularly because it was so slanted socially against the ordinary peasants. Most of the leaders belonging to the nobility (usually from families close to Ras Haile Selassie Gugsa) were pardoned within two to three years. But ordinary peasants were massacred, cattle were stolen, houses were torched, and Blatta Haile Mariam Redda remained in jail for 22 years. This was not to be forgotten in the collective memory of the people of Tigray. The Tigray province and some parts of Wollo were badly hit in subsequent famines, partly as a consequence of the harsh pacification process. The punishment for the uprising severe as it may be with the aerial bombardment, the people were obliged to pay large sums of money, and their land was confiscated and distributed to loyal gentry as a punishment and deterrent to future revolt. New taxation was imposed that 'cost the peasants five times more than they had under the Italians during the occupation'. Ten Woyane rebel leaders were captured and sent to prison in Debrebirhan. Including the top leaders, Basha Gugsa Mengesha, Dej. Bezabih Negussie, and Hailemariam Reda. Bashay Gugsa was also not allowed to return to Tigray, because the central government feared his influence. However, the central government tried to make use of his military skills and sent him with a group of soldiers to suppress other rebellions in southern Ethiopia.

Although the Woyane rebellion of 1943 had shortcomings as a prototype revolution, historians however agree that the Woyane rebellion had involved a fairly high level of spontaneity and peasant initiative. It demonstrated considerable popular participation and reflected widely shared grievances. The uprising was unequivocally and specifically directed against the central Shoan Amhara regime of Haile Selassie I, rather than the Tigrayan imperial elite.

== Second Woyane ==
Second Woyane refers to the Ethiopian Civil War, where the TPLF fought a 15-year-long war against the Derg regime of 1974–1991.

In that context, the Woyane rebellion that is the subject of this article is called Old Woyane or First Woyane (ቀዳማይ ወያነ).

== See also ==
- Black Lions
- Italian guerrilla war in Ethiopia
- Famines in Ethiopia
