= Zata =

Coordinates: 12.303546°N 39.172931°E

Zatta ዛታ Zata
- Woreda
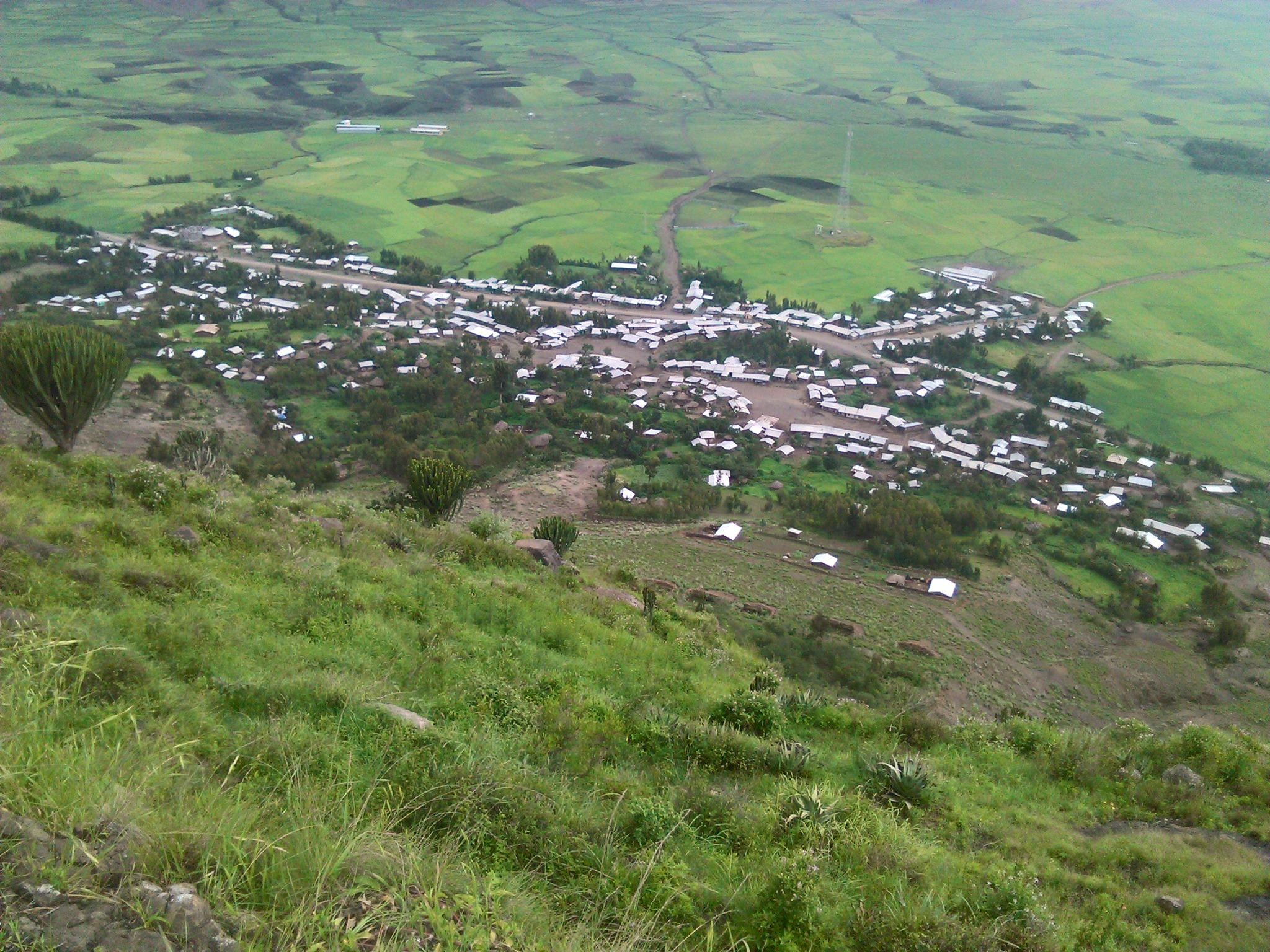

- Location within Ethiopia
- Country: Ethiopia
- Region: Tigray
- Zone: Debubawi Zone
- Elevation: 2,387 m (7,831 ft)

Population (2007)
  - Total: 121,403
- Time zone: UTC+3 (EAT)

Zatta (also ዛታ) is one of the woredas within the Tigray Region of Ethiopia. Part of the Debubawi Zone. Zatta is bordered with Amhara Region with a river namely Tslare ( ጽላረ) which flows into the Tekezé River. Wereda Zatta contains several monasteries and sacred churches like deqol(ደቆል), St. George, St. Merry, St. Michael. The town of Zatta has Highschool, elementary school, clinic, and scenery in it. The town resides at the bottom of Zatta mountain.

Zatta is located midway between Korem and Sekota. The main load that goes from Korem to Sekota which is 100 kilometres (62 mi) long crosses Zata at 35 kilometres (22 mi) from Korem.
