= Mekoni =

Mekoni መኾኒ
- Town
- Location within Ethiopia
- Coordinates: 12°48.17′N 39°38.754′E
- Country: Ethiopia
- Region: Tigray
- Zone: Dubawi (Southern)
- Woreda: Raya Azebo
- Elevation: 2,479 m (8,133 ft)

Population (2007)
  - Total: 9,419
- Time zone: UTC+3 (EAT)

Mekoni, also Mehoni (Ge'ez: መኾኒ or መሆኒ), is a town in the Tigray Region of Ethiopia. "Mekoni" (pronounced as 'Me-koni') is located at 657 km north of Addis Ababa along Ethiopian Highway 2 which runs to Mekelle (the capital city of Tigray region), Adigrat, Aksum, Shire and Humera with an altitude of 2479 m.

== Economy ==
The town's economy is agriculturally focused. In recent years, there have been construction of irrigated and terraced farming in order to fight desertification.
