= Tigrayan nationalism =

Ethnic nationalism

Tigrayan nationalism is an ethnic nationalism that advocates the interests of Tigrayan people in Ethiopia. Inspired predominantly by the Tigray People's Liberation Front (TPLF) with its predecessor Tigray Liberation Front (TLF), this type of nationalism holds that Tigrayans are an independent group with unique ancestry, heritage, history and culture outside Ethiopia. As such, they claim Tigray is the source of Ethiopian civilization and utterly a benefactor of state-building without other local ethnic groups. Tigrayan nationalists accuse Amhara political elites of imposing their cultural, economic and political hegemony over Tigrayans.

Flag of the Tigray Region

Tigrayan nationalism is prominently featured during the Ethiopian People’s Revolutionary Democratic Front (EPRDF) regime in the pretext of ethnic federalism in Ethiopia since 1991.

== History ==
Tigrayan nationalism dates back to the reign of Yohannes IV, Yohannes's rule and his military victories against foreign forces created а strong regional identity and unity among the Tigrayan people. The death of Yohannes in Metemma in 1889 and the loss of the northern Tigrinya-speaking territories to Italian Eritrea (Akele Guzai, Hamasien, Seraye and Senhit) made Tigray significantly less powerful. The rise of Menelik II of Shewa to the throne further saw the decline of Tigray into political irrelevance. Tigrayan nationalists deeply resent the loss of hegemony to the Shewan Amhara. John Markakis describes this feeling of unmerited subjugation to the Amhara as "Tigray's perennial disaffection."

Unlike Eritrean nationalism whose ultimate goal was for maintaining geographical boundary of Eritreans, the Tigrayan nationalism was emerged as ethnical-based movement with unified narrative of Tigrayan nation such as association with Aksumite civilization, the Ethiopian Orthodox Church (via the original Ark of the Holy Covenant) and the Solomonic dynasty. Another cause was resentment over Amhara imperial dominance, who shared a related language, geographical settings and religion. While the Ethiopian Empire was historically dominated by Amharas, the concept of an "oppressive Amhara regime" was developed in Tigray during the rule of Haile Selassie and Mengistu Haile Mariam. The political power of the Amhara was accompanied by their cultural hegemony. Tigrayans were being pressured, directly and indirectly, to abandon their culture and their own language. The first visible sign of Tigrayan nationalism expressed was during the 1943 Woyane rebellion in Tigray Province which has been suppressed by Emperor Haile Selassie with the help of the British.

In 1970s, Tigrayan nationalists felt hostility towards Haile Selassie government due to persistent famine and drought in Tigray Province and blamed such policies suited Amhara peripheralization. Cultural suppression or "Amharazation" caused resentment among Tigrayan elites in cities like Addis Ababa, who reported anti-Tigrayan discrimination by the central government. In 1975, the Tigray People's Liberation Front (TPLF) was formed as a result of Derg's harsh land reform policy. TPLF was not bare instigator of Tigrayan nationalism, but also the Tigray Liberation Front (TLF) and the Ethiopian Democratic Union (EDU) alliance with Tigrayan rebels to fight against the Derg contributed to the raise of nationalism. Furthermore, the Eritrean People's Liberation Front (EPLF) supported TPLF to become the greater front of Tigray. Both factions were heavily inspired by Marxist revolutionary ideology. In May 1988, TPLF established the Ethiopian People’s Revolutionary Democratic Front (EPRDF) to combat Mengistu's regime by proliferating ethnic entente with the rest of political groups in Ethiopia. After the fall of the Derg, TPLF justified Tigrayan nationalism by implementing ethnic federalism since 1991.

== Identity ==
Tigrayan nationalists whose ideologue is similar to TPLF regime, traced its historical achievement back to Aksumite era rather than the Solomonic era. They state that Tigrayans served as Amhara's benefactor for orchestrating Ethiopian state identity, while portraying them as pillar of Ethiopian civilization. For instance, during the hundredth anniversary of battle of Adwa in 1996, the EPRDF government sought to emphasize the importance of Tigrayans as a main agent over the victory. However, this attitude was alter during the Ethiopian-Eritrean War in 1998-2000, where the victory rebranded as Pan-Ethiopian resistance against the Italians, the latter is portrayed by Eritrean forces. Tigrayan exceptionalism expresses Tigrayan superiority in Ethiopia by various ways, including historical contributions and assisted state-building.

== See also ==
- Amhara nationalism
- Oromo nationalism
- Eritrean nationalism
