= Arso Airport =

- IATA: ARJ; ICAO: WAJA

Summary
- Location: Arso, Indonesia
- Elevation AMSL: 150 ft / 46 m
- Coordinates: 2.9333329°S 140.7833405°E

Map
- Location in Papua Location in Western New Guinea Location in Indonesia

Runways
Direction	Length		Surface
Direction	ft	m	Surface
	1,640	500

Arso Airport is an airport in Arso, Indonesia.
