= Italian 1st Eritrean Division =

Division of the Italian Army

The First Eritrean Division or I Division Indigeni (Native) was organized for service in the Second Italo-Abyssinian War in 1935.

It was formed from the Eritrean askari of the Battalion indigeni (Native Battalions) who provided the regular colonial forces of Italian Eritrea.
It was dissolved in 1936 after the war.

== Organization ==
1st Native Division - Gen. Salvatore di Pietro

- 1st Mixed Brigade - Brig. Gen. Gallina
  - 1st Native Battalion Group
    - I "Turitto" Native Battalion
    - VI "Cossu" Native Battalion
    - XVI "Adi Caieh" Native Battalion
  - 5th Native Battalion Group
    - VII "Prestinari" Native Battalion
    - XV "Billia" Native Battalion
  - 1st Mountain Artillery Battalion (65/17 mod. 13 mountain guns)
- 3rd Mixed Brigade - Brig. Gen. Cubeddu
  - 2nd Native Battalion Group
    - III "Galliano" Native Battalion
    - XI Native Battalion
  - 6th Native Battalion Group
    - II "Hidalgo" Native Battalion
    - XIII "Roma" Native Battalion
    - XXIV Native Battalion
  - 3rd Mountain Artillery Battalion (65/17 mod. 13 mountain guns)

== Commanders ==
- gen. Alessandro Di Pietro
- gen. Gustavo Pesenti
