= Maychew =

Maychew ማይጨው (salt water)
- Town and Woreda
- Location within Ethiopia Location within the Horn of Africa Location within Africa
- Coordinates: 12°47′N 39°32′E
- Country: Ethiopia
- Region: Tigray
- Zone: Debubawi (Southern)
- Elevation: 2,479 m (8,133 ft)

Population (2007)
  - Total: 23,419
- Time zone: UTC+3 (EAT)

Maychew, also Maichew (Tigrinya: ማይጨው, "salt water"), is a town and woreda in the Tigray Region of Ethiopia. It is located at 665 km north of Addis Ababa along Ethiopian Highway 2. According to Ethiopia’s agro-ecological setting, Maychew and its environs are classified under the Weinadega (semi-temperate zone). Maychew is located in the endoreic basin of the Afar Triangle. The streams near Maychew do not reach the ocean.

== History ==
After his capture in 1921 by Gugsa Araya Selassie, the deposed Lij Iyasu was detained for two weeks at Maychew.

Near Maychew, on March 31, 1936, the conclusive battle of the Italian invasion of Ethiopia was fought. By means of more sophisticated and powerful weaponry and superior numbers, along with modern training, the Italians routed the Ethiopian forces, and six weeks later marched unopposed into the capital, Addis Ababa. The battle of Maychew was despairing for the emperor.

During the Italian occupation, the inhabitants included about 500 local population and 22 Italians. Facilities included telephone service, an infirmary, a gas station, restaurant, and a Tuesday market.

In the early years of the Ethiopian Civil War, the Derg required that all vehicles travelling north from Maychew be restricted to convoys. By 1980, convoys were deemed necessary to move even the 20 kilometers from Maychew to Mehoni. During the 1984 - 1985 famine in Ethiopia, the commander of the First Division, Colonel Hailu Gebre Yohannis, ordered the theft of food stocks from the NGO World Vision in Maychew to feed his hungry troops. By 8 September 1989, Ethiopian People's Revolutionary Democratic Front forces had captured Maychew and Korem, and afterwards advanced along the main highway southwards.

Between February 1999 and April 2000, SUR Construction built a road segments connecting Maychew with Alamata by way of Mehoni about 68 kilometers in length. A notable landmark in this town is the church Maychew Mikael Bete Kristiyan.

== Demographics ==
The population comprises mainly Tigraians. Amharic is frequently used as trade language. Tigraians are dominantly Orthodox Christians. Based on the 2007 national census conducted by the Central Statistical Agency of Ethiopia (CSA), this town has a total population of 23,419, of whom 11,024 are men and 12,395 women. 95.28% of the population said they were Orthodox Christians, and 4.24% were Muslim.

The 1994 census reported it had a total population of 19,757 of whom 8,894 were men and 10,863 were women.
