= Alamata =

Town in Tigray Region, Ethiopia

Alamata ኣላማጣ
- Town
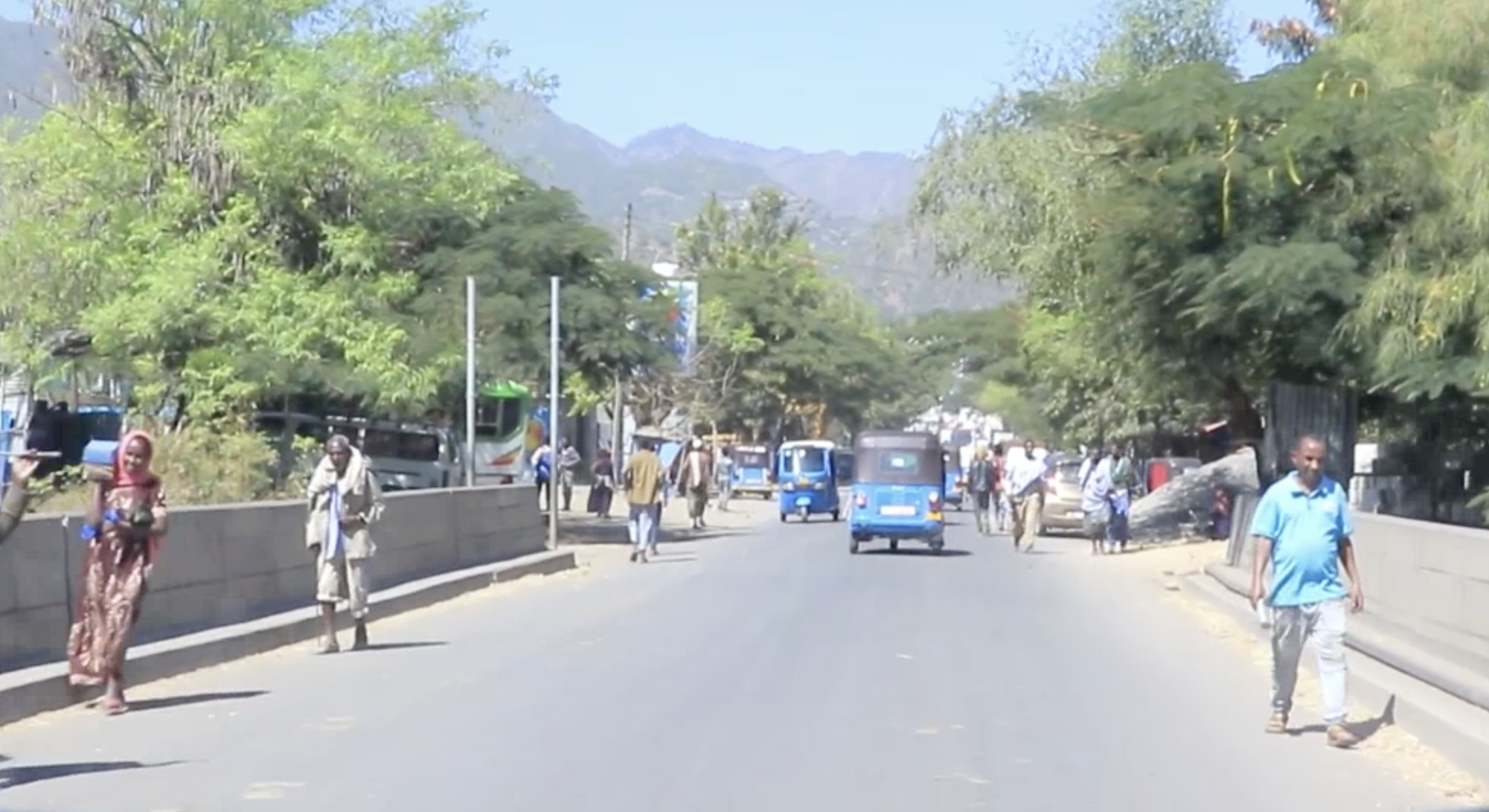

- Location within Ethiopia
- Coordinates: 12°25′N 39°33′E
- Country: Ethiopia
- Region: Tigray
- Zone: Debubawi (Southern)
- Woreda: Alamata
- Elevation: 1,520 m (4,990 ft)

Population (2007)
  - Total: 33,214
- Time zone: UTC+3 (EAT)

Alamata (Tigrinya: ኣላማጣ ) is a town in the Tigray Region of Ethiopia. Located in the Debubawi (Southern) zone of Tigray it has a latitude and longitude of 12°25′N 39°33′E and an elevation of 1,520 metres (4,990 ft) above sea level and is located along Ethiopian Highway 2. It is surrounded by Alamata woreda.

== History ==
=== 19th century ===
On 14 December 1895, Emperor Menilek's army passed through Alamata on their way northwards against to fight against the Italians.

=== 20th century ===
During the Second Italo-Ethiopian War, the Red Cross had a camp at Alamata which treated 130 cases of mustard gas injuries. The town was captured by the 1st Eritrean Division led by General Gustavo Pesenti on 7 April 1936.

Axel B. Svensson visited Alamata in late 1938, finding that the town was home to a large army base and a small Italian township. He also described the territory around Alamata as exceedingly dangerous due to the presence of guerrillas.

The Arbegnoch under British leadership, liberated the town from Italian control during the Second World War on 5 May 1941; it was at the southern edge of the Woyane rebellion of 1943.

The first reports of crop failure in Wollo, were made in October 1971 by the chief municipal officer of Alamata; this report was handled very indifferently by his superiors who did not respond until July 1972, when they asked for a revised report.

Alamata was garrisoned by the Derg during the Ethiopian Civil War. The Tigray People's Liberation Front captured the town in 1988.{

== Demographics ==
Based on the 2007 national census, Alamata has a total population of 33,214, of whom 16,140 are men and 17,074 women. 82.35% of the population said they were Orthodox Christians, and 16.96% were Muslim.

The 1994 census reported this town had a total population of 26,179 of whom 12,094 were males and 14,085 were females.

== Geography ==
=== Location ===
Alamata is located in the southern zone of Tigray. It is situated 600 kilometres (370 mi) north of Addis Ababa and about 180 kilometres (110 mi) south of the Tigray Regional capital city, Mekelle.

=== Topography ===
Topographically, Alamata is divided into western highland and eastern lowland. The western part (Tsetsera and Merewa) is categorized under the northern highlands of Ethiopia, having an altitude range of 2,000–3,000 metres (6,600–9,800 ft). It is characterized by steep slopes, gorges and undulating terrain having scattered flat lands used for grazing livestock and farming. It covers 25% of the woreda. The topography of the area dominated by steep slopes has induced erosion. The eastern lowland with its eight tabias is generally plain in topography with an altitude ranging from 1,450–1,750 metres (4,760–5,740 ft). The plain landscape of this area makes the area suitable for agriculture and it covers 75% of the woreda.

Alamata is located in the endoreic basin of the Afar Triangle. The streams near Alamata do not reach the ocean.

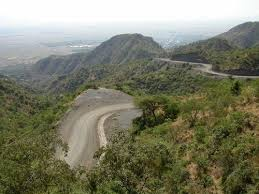
Road from Alamata to Mekelle.

== Climate ==
Climate data for Alamata (1971–2000)
Month	Jan	Feb	Mar	Apr	May	Jun	Jul	Aug	Sep	Oct	Nov	Dec	Year
Mean daily maximum °C (°F)	27.3 (81.1)	27.1 (80.8)	29.5 (85.1)	29.7 (85.5)	32.6 (90.7)	35.0 (95.0)	31.5 (88.7)	29.7 (85.5)	30.9 (87.6)	29.9 (85.8)	28.6 (83.5)	27.1 (80.8)	29.9 (85.8)
Mean daily minimum °C (°F)	11.5 (52.7)	12.8 (55.0)	13.5 (56.3)	13.9 (57.0)	15.3 (59.5)	15.9 (60.6)	15.6 (60.1)	15.0 (59.0)	14.4 (57.9)	13.2 (55.8)	12.1 (53.8)	11.4 (52.5)	13.7 (56.7)
Average precipitation mm (inches)	32.0 (1.26)	42.0 (1.65)	195.0 (7.68)	85.0 (3.35)	37.0 (1.46)	8.0 (0.31)	159.0 (6.26)	180.0 (7.09)	37.0 (1.46)	17.0 (0.67)	18.0 (0.71)	31.0 (1.22)	841 (33.12)
Average relative humidity (%)	59	58	55	54	46	47	72	78	60	55	53	55	58
Source: FAO

== Economy ==
=== Agriculture ===
A mixed farming system with the predominant of crop production is practiced in the district. The major food crops grown in the area are cereals (sorghum, teff, and maize), pulses, oilseeds, vegetables and root crops.

=== Electricity ===
A 458 kilometres (285 mi) high voltage transmission line was constructed to transport electricity from Alamata to Legetafo in central Ethiopia.

== Transportation ==
The Weldiya–Mekelle Railway will have a station in Alamata.
