= Gustavo Pesenti =

Italian general

Gustavo Pesenti

Gustavo Pesenti (January 15, 1878 – January 18, 1960) was an Italian general. He was Italian colonial governor of Somaliland.

== Biography ==
He was a knight of the Military Order of Savoy. He was a recipient of the Bronze Medal of Military Valor. He fought in the Italo-Turkish War, World War I and Second Italo-Ethiopian War.

From June 1940 to December 1940 he was Governor of Somalia. He was in good relationship with the British and did not want to do war against them.

Military Service:

- 1925-03-11 – 1925-12-XX Commanding Officer Agedabia Military Zone [North Africa]
- 1928-XX-XX – 1929-XX-XX Commanding Officer Royal Colonial Troop Corps Somalia
- 1929-04-01 – 1933-01-31 Commanding Officer 7th Alpine Regiment
- 1933-XX-XX Inspector of Mobilization, Territorial Military Division Imperia
- 1933-XX-XX – 1934-XX-XX Commanding Officer 4th Alpine Brigade
- 1934-XX-XX General Officer Commanding 4th Higher Alpine Command
- 1934-XX-XX General Officer Commanding 4th Higher Alpine Command "Cuneense"
- 1935-XX-XX – 1936-XX-XX Commanding Officer 4th Eritreran Brigade [East Africa]
- 1936-XX-XX General Officer Commanding 1st Eritrean Division [East Africa]
- 1937-XX-XX – 1938-09-01 General Officer Commanding Firenze Territorial Defence Command
- 1938-09-01 – Attached to the Ministry of Italian Africa
- 1940-06-11 – 1940-12-31 Acting Governor of Somaliland– 1941-02-01 Attached to the Ministry of Italian Africa
- 1941-02-01 – Attached to the Ministry of War
- 1942-01-15 Retired

== Publications ==
- Canti e ritmi arabici, somalici e suhaili, Bollettino della Reale Società Geografica Italiana, 1910.
- Di alcuni canti arabici e somalici, Bollettino della Reale Società Geografica Italiana, 1912.
- I canti del “Dikir”, Bollettino della Reale Sociatà Geografica Italiana, 1916.
- Canti sacri e profani: danze e ritmi degli Arabi dei Somali e dei Suhaili, L'eroica, Milano, 1929.
- Il maresciallo Cadorna condottiero ed animatore del primo esercito nazionale, Regia Stamperia della colonia, Mogadiscio, 1929.
- La musica è mediterranea, L'Eroica, Milano, 1932.
- Danane : nella Somàlia italiano: nel XXV anniversario del combattimento (9-10 febbraio 1907), L'Eroica, Milano, 1932.
- In Palestina e in Siria durante e dopo la Grande Guerra, L'Eroica, Milano, 1932.
- La Prima Divisione Eritrea alla battaglia dell'Ascianghi, L'Eroica, Milano, 1937.
- L'Islam in occidente, L'Eroica, Milano, 1938.
- La svastica infranta: Note e considerazioni sul defunto III Reich, Bertello, 1945
- La muraglia blindata, Bertello, 1947.
- Le guerre coloniali, N. Zanichelli, Bologna, 1947.
- Alla scoperta del continente nero, Demos, Genova, 1950.
- Fronte Kenya (la guerra in A. O. I.-1940-41), Bertello, 1953.

Preceded by Francesco Saverio Caroselli	Italian Governor of Somaliland; 1940	Succeeded by Carlo De Simone

== Bibliography ==
- Battaglia, Antonello (2015). Da Suez ad Aleppo: La campagna Alleata e il Distaccamento italiano in Siria e Palestina (1917-1921). Rome: Edizioni Nuova Sapienza. ISBN 978-88-6812-560-8.
- Bianchi, Andrea (2012). Gli Ordini militari di Savoia e d'Italia, Vol. 3. Edizioni A.N.A.
- Del Boca, Angelo (1986). Gli Italiani in Libia. Tripoli bel suol d'amore 1860-1922. Milan: Arnoldo Mondadori Editore. ISBN 978-88-04-42660-8.
- Del Boca, Angelo (2001). Gli Italiani in Africa Orientale. La conquista dell'impero. Milan: A. Mondadori Editore. ISBN 978-88-04-46947-6.
- La Via, Stefano; Petrobelli, Pierluigi; Parker, Roger (2000). Pensieri per un maestro: studi in onore di Pierluigi Pietrobelli. Turin: EDT s.r.l. ISBN 88-7063-645-3.
- Charles D. Pettibone (2010). The Organization and Order of Battle of Militaries in World War II Volume VI Italy and France Including the Neutral Countries of San Marino, Vatican City (Holy See), Andorra, and Monaco. Trafford Publishing. ISBN 978-1-4269-4633-2.
- Potenza, Giuseppe (2015). Ragguagli moderni. Edizioni G. Potenza. ISBN 978-88-925-1320-4.
- Vento, Andrea (2010). In silenzio gioite e soffrite: storia dei servizi segreti italiani dal Risorgimento alla Guerra Fredda. Milan: Il Saggiatore. ISBN 978-88-428-1604-1.
