= Raya Azebo =

Administrative district in Tigray region, Ethiopia

Raya Azebo ራያ ዓዘቦ
- Woreda
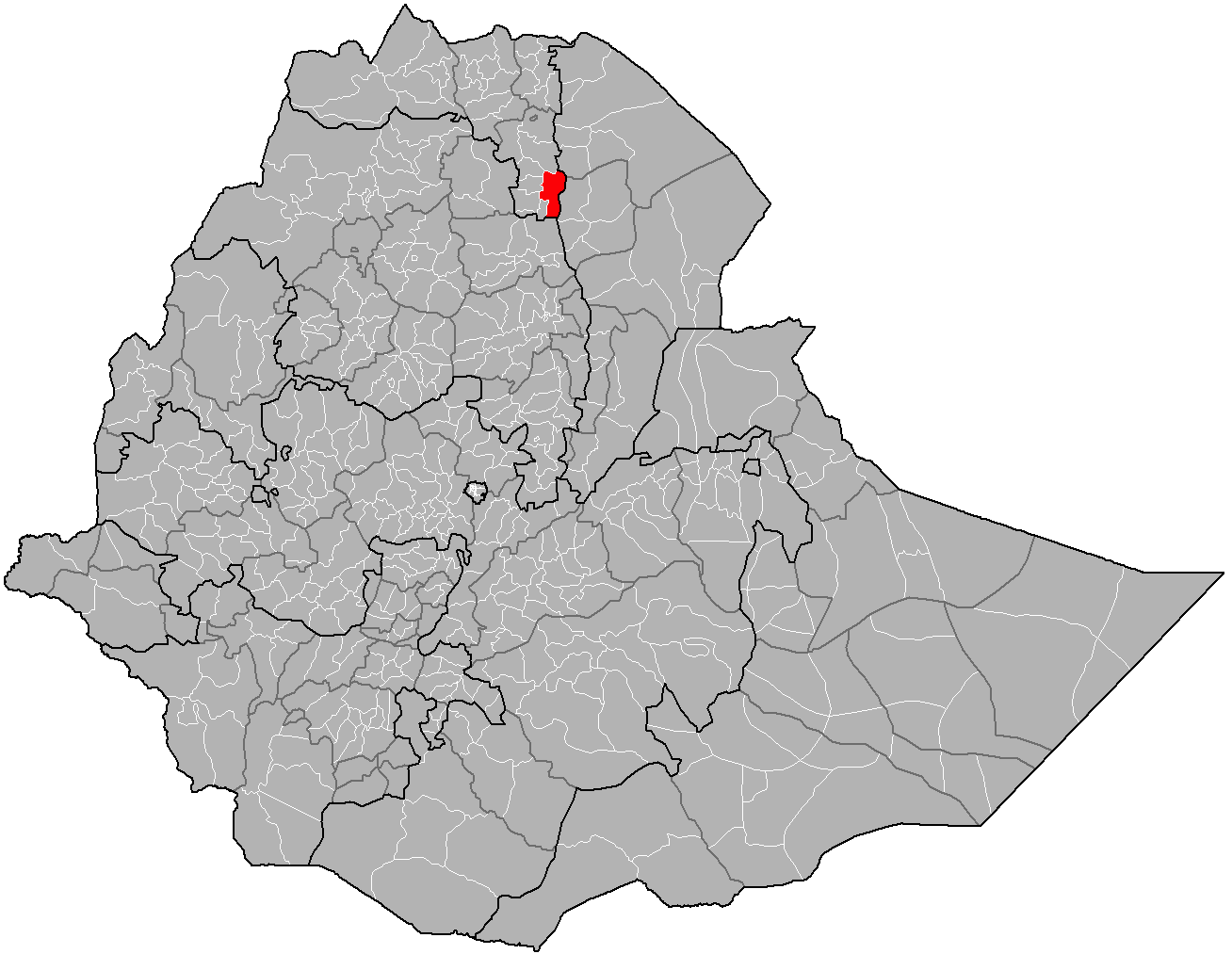
- Country: Ethiopia
- Region: Tigray
- Zone: Debubawi (Southern)

Area
  - Total: 2,132.83 km^{2} (823.49 sq mi)

Population (2007)
  - Total: 135,870

Raya Azebo is one of the woredas in the Tigray region of Ethiopia. The administrative center of this district is Mekhoni. Other towns in Raya Azebo include Kukufto, Bala, and Chercher.

== History ==
=== Air raids during the civil war of the 1980s ===
During the Ethiopian Civil War, on 9 September 1989, Chercher was bombed by the Ethiopian Air Force 148 people were killed and over 100 wounded. On 12 September 1989, the village of Gerarsa (northeast of Mekhoni) was bombed and four people were wounded.

=== Administrative Boundaries ===
The territory of Raya-Azebo is located in the southern part of Tigray. It borders the Amhara state and Afar state.

== Demographics ==
Based on the 2007 national census conducted by the Central Statistical Agency of Ethiopia (CSA), this district has a total population of 135,870, an increase of 55.04% over the 1994 census, of whom 67,687 are men and 68,183 women; 16,056 or 11.82% are urban inhabitants. With an area of 2,132.83 square kilometers, Raya Azebo has a population density of 63.70, which is greater than the Zone average of 53.91 persons per square kilometer. A total of 32,360 households were counted in this district, resulting in an average of 4.20 persons to a household, and 31,468 housing units. 70.61% of the population said they were Orthodox Christians, and 29.32% were Muslim.

The 1994 national census reported a total population for this district of 87,638 of whom 43,259 were men and 44,379 were women; 8,047 or 9.18% of its population were urban. Tigrigna was spoken as a first language by 85.52%, 11.04% Amharic, 1.83% Oromo, and 1.53% spoke Afar; the remaining 0.08% spoke all other primary languages reported. 69.15% of the population practiced Ethiopian Orthodox Christianity, and 30.82% were Muslim. Concerning education, 8.44% of the population were considered literate, which is less than the Zone average of 15.71%; 14.64% of children aged 7–12 were in primary school; 0.9% of the children aged 13–14 were in junior secondary school; and 0.31% of the inhabitants aged 15–18 were in senior secondary school. Concerning sanitary conditions, 56.9% of the urban houses and 13.4% of all houses had access to safe drinking water at the time of the census; 20.6% of the urban and about 4.7% of the total had toilet facilities.
