= Korem =

Town in Tigray Region, Ethiopia

Korem ኮረም Quorum, Kworam
- Town and woreda
- Location within Ethiopia
- Coordinates: 12°30′N 39°31′E
- Country: Ethiopia
- Zone: Southern Tigray Woreda
- Elevation: 2,539 m (8,330 ft)

Population (2007)
  - Total: 16,856
- Time zone: UTC+3 (EAT)

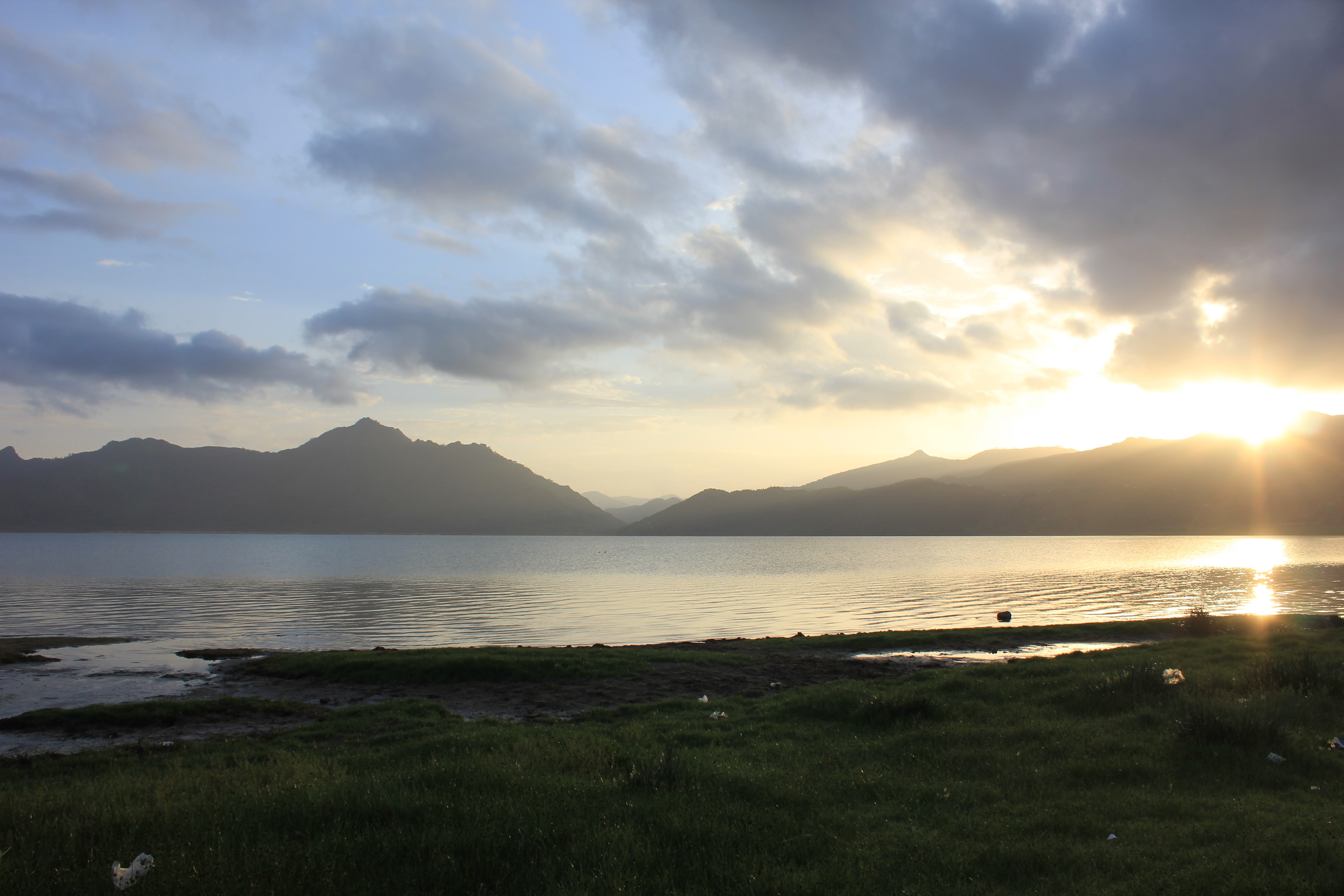
Lake Ashenge, north of Korem

Korem (Tigrinya: ኮረም) (alternative forms include Ofla, Kworem, Quoram) is a town and separate woreda in Tigray, Ethiopia. Located on the eastern edge of the Ethiopian Highlands in the Southern Zone of the Tigray Region, this town has a latitude and longitude of 12°30′N 39°31′E with an elevation of 2539 meters above sea level and is located along Ethiopian Highway 2. Korem is located in the endorheic basin of the Afar Triangle. The streams near Korem do not reach the ocean. Lake Ashenge is located six kilometers to the north of Korem. The town of Korem is surrounded by Wefla woreda.

== History ==
=== 20th century ===
The telegraph line the Italians constructed between 1902 and 1904 from Asmara south to Addis Ababa passed through the town, and had an office in Korem. Near the town on 9 October 1909, Abraha Araya, governor of Enderta, made a surprise attack at dawn on Dejazmach Abate Bwalu, the new governor of Tigray. Abreha had declared that he would not submit to the Dejazmach.

During the Second Italo-Ethiopian War, the Italians are said to have attacked Ethiopian soldiers near the town with shells releasing mustard gas, with instances of Italians using chemical weapons use at Korem recorded for March 16–18, and April 4–7, 1936. More certain are the reports that three planes of Ethiopian Red Cross, sitting on the airstrip at Korem, were destroyed by Italian fighters. In 1937, during the Italian occupation, the Arbegnoch sacked Korem, which was being held by the Italians. Minister of War Ras Abebe Aregai, made Korem his headquarters during the Woyane rebellion. The main road northwards was finally cleared on 6 October.

Korem was the location of one of the early refugee camps of the 1983–1985 famine in Ethiopia, housing 35,500 children in April 1983. On 21 April, the TPLF raided the town, seizing humanitarian supplies and taking seven relief workers hostage, who included two British citizens from the Save the Children Fund. The hostages were released unharmed seven weeks later near the Sudan border, but Save the Children suspended operations in Korem until September of that year.

From July 1983 up to March 1984 the monthly death toll in the Korem camp stayed under 100; then it shot up until October 1984, when the daily death toll topped 100 a day. What food aid there was in Korem in October 1984 was from the European Commission. Along with the camp at Atsbi, conditions in Korem were shown on BBC television on 23 and 24 October. UN Secretary-General Javier Pérez de Cuéllar and his wife visited the relief center in the following month. Although international assistance greatly improved conditions in the camp, they remained grim for the inmates, who were treated as prisoners. In January 1986, an estimated 12,000 of the camp population had fled into the surrounding hills for fear of being registered for involuntary resettlement.

EPRDF forces captured Maychew and Korem 8 September 1989, afterwards continuing their advance south along the main highway.

== Demographics ==
Based on the 2007 national census conducted by the Central Statistical Agency of Ethiopia, this town has a total population of 16,856, of whom 7,532 are men and 9,324 women. 92.12% of the population said they were Orthodox Christians, and 7.65% were Muslim.

The 1994 census reported it had a total population of 16,895 of whom 7,371 were males and 9,524 were females.
