= Southern Zone, Tigray =

Zone in Tigray Region of Ethiopia

Coordinates: 13°30′N 39°00′E

Southern Zone ዞባ ደቡባዊ
- Zone
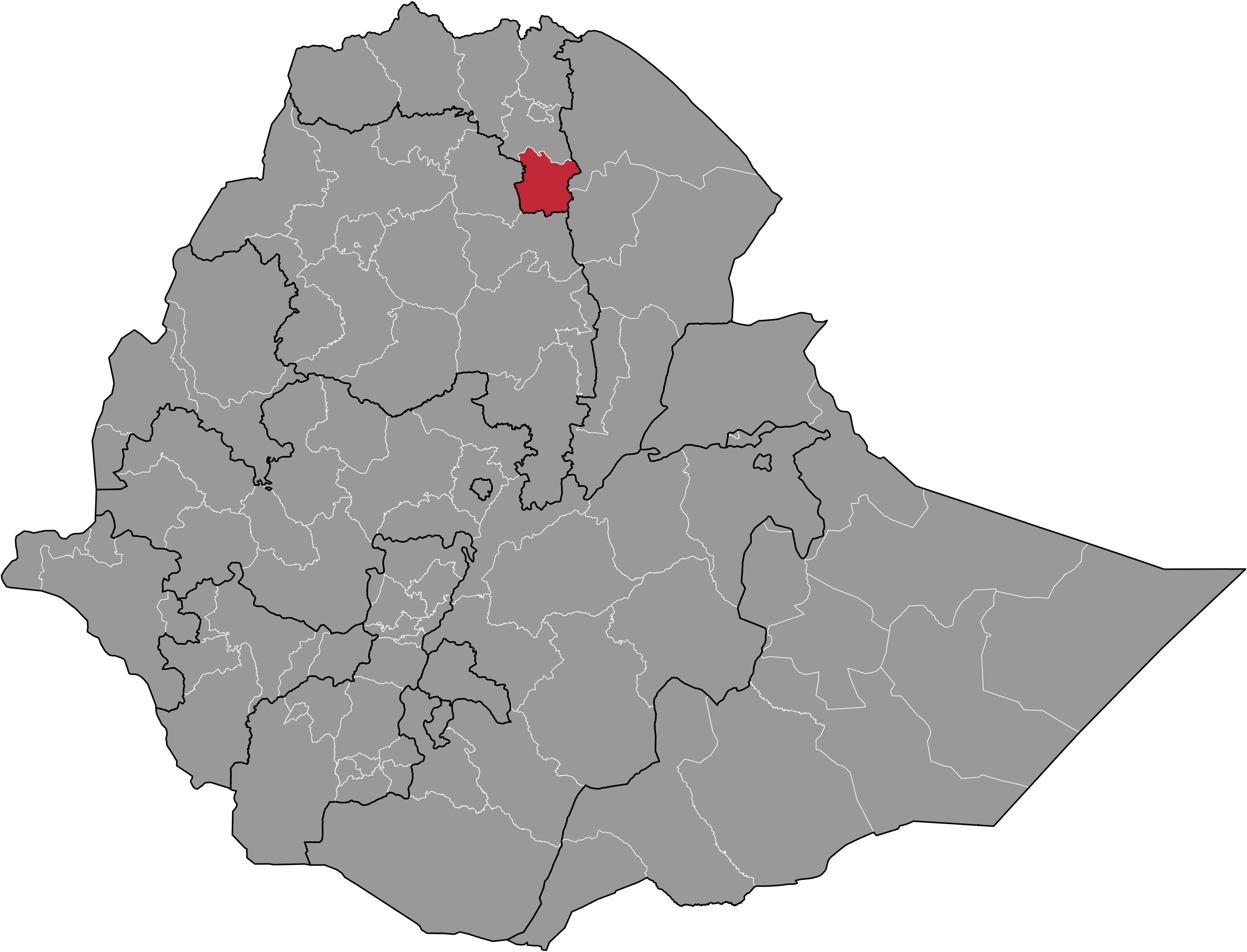
- Location in Ethiopia
- Country: Ethiopia
- Region: Tigray
- Largest city: Maychew

Area
  - Total: 18,670.45 km^{2} (7,208.70 sq mi)

Population (2012 est.)
  - Total: 1,138,440
  - Density: 60.9755/km^{2} (157.926/sq mi)

The Southern Zone (Tigrinya: ዞባ ደቡባዊ) is a zone in the Tigray Region of Ethiopia. The Southern Zone is bordered on the south and west by the Amhara Region, on the north by the Central Zone, and on the east by the Afar Region. Towns and cities in the Southern Zone include Maychew, Korem, Zata and Alamata. The South Eastern Zone was separated from the Southern Zone.

The highest point in this Zone is Mount Ferrah Amba (3954 meters; sometimes called Tsibet after the nearby village), one of the southernmost peaks of the Raya Mountains. Due to its prominent location dominating the roadway that runs past it from Mekelle south to Maychew, this mountain has been the scene of several battles. Important bodies of water include Lake Hashenge.

== Demographics ==
A map of the regions and zones of Ethiopia

Based on the 2007 Census conducted by the Central Statistical Agency of Ethiopia (CSA), this Zone has a total population of 1,006,504, of whom 497,280 are men and 509,224 women; 125,787 or 12.5% are urban inhabitants. Two largest ethnic groups reported in the Southern Zone were Tigrayan (95.36%) and Amhara (2.7%); all other ethnic groups made up 1.94% of the population. Tigrinya is spoken as a first language by 92.49%, Amharic by 5.58% and Xamtanga by 1.01%; the remaining 0.92% spoke all other primary languages reported. 92.15% of the population said they were Orthodox Christians, and 7.79% were Muslim.

Based on figures from the Central Statistical Agency in 2005, this zone has an estimated total population of 1,239,988, of whom 610,164 are men and 629,824 are women; 361,252 or 29.1% of its population are urban dwellers. With an estimated area of 9,310.96 square kilometers, the Southern Zone has an estimated population density of 133.18 people per square kilometer.

The 1994 national census reported a total population for this Zone of 873,509 people in 210,858 households, of whom 425,655 were men and 447,854 women; 207,352 or 23.7% of its population were urban dwellers. The Zone is predominantly Tigrayan, at 92.1% of the population, while 5.4% were Amhara, 1.5% were Agaw, and all other ethnic groups 1.0%. Tigrinya is spoken by 91.7% of the population, and Amharic was a first language by 6.3% and as a second language by 11.5%. 92.2% of the population said they observed Ethiopian Orthodox Christianity while 7.6% were Muslim.

According to a May 24, 2004 World Bank memorandum, 15% of the inhabitants of the Southern Zone have access to electricity, this zone has a road density of 80.2 kilometers per 1000 square kilometers, the average rural household has 0.8 hectare of land (compared to the national average of 1.01 hectare of land and a regional average of 0.51) and the equivalent of 0.9 heads of livestock. 34.5% of the population is in non-farm related jobs, compared to the national average of 25% and a regional average of 28%. 64% of all eligible children are enrolled in primary school, and 24% in secondary schools. 36% of the zone is exposed to malaria, and none to Tsetse fly. The memorandum gave this zone a drought risk rating of 627.
