= Olol Dinle =

Sultan of Ajuran (r. 1922–early 1950)

- Sultan of the Sciavelli and Auia
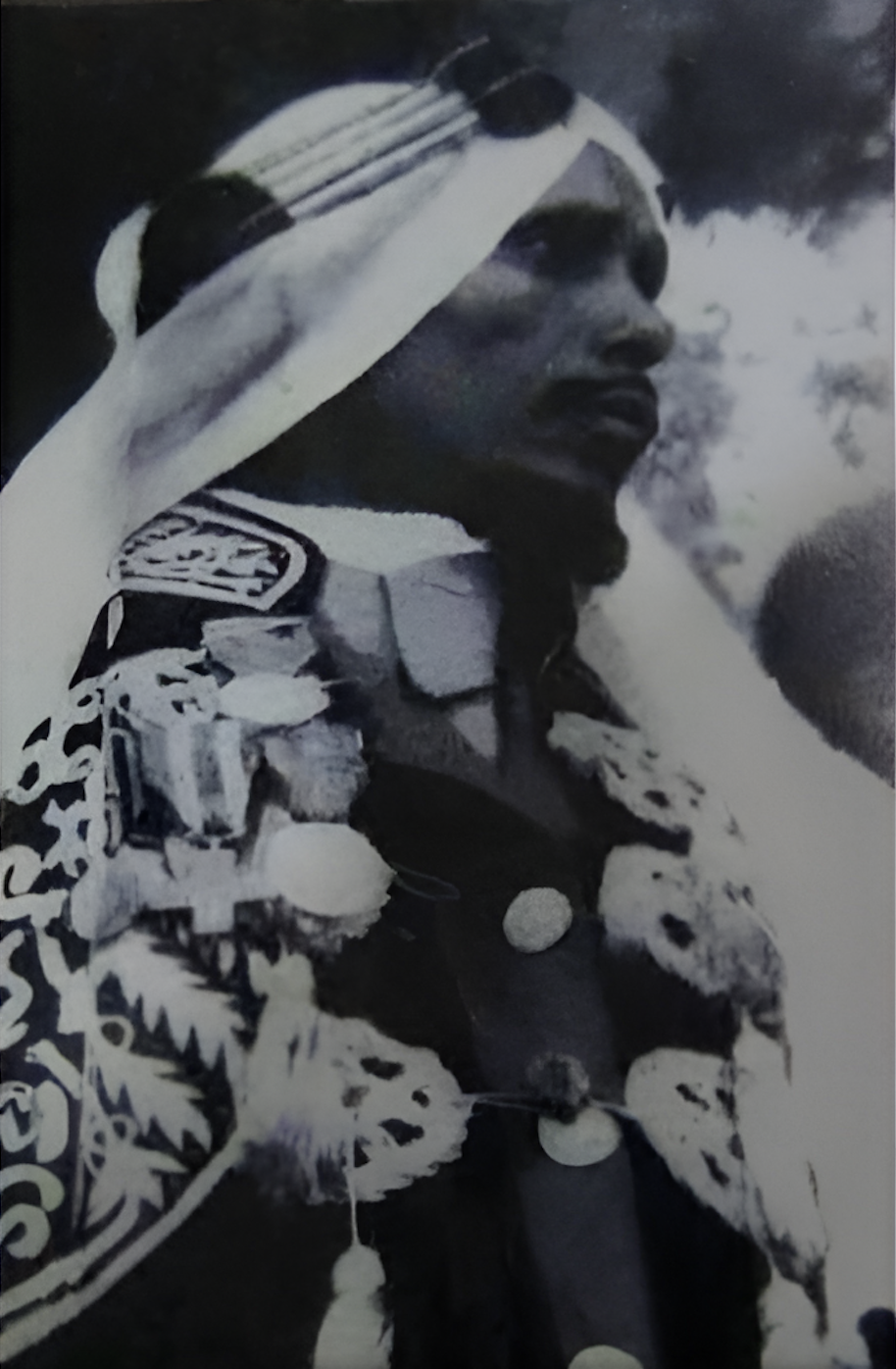
- An official portrait of Olol Dinle, c. 1936

Sultan of the Ajuran
- Reign: 1922–1950
- Born: Kelafo, Ethiopia
- Died: 1953; Addis Ababa, Ethiopia
- Issue: Muhamad Olol Dinle Abdullaziz Olol Dinle; Abdirahman Olol Dinle; Abdihakin Olol Dinle; Dihni Olol Dinle; Ruun Olol Dinle; Faduma Olol Dinle; Maryama Olol Dinle Masayan Olol Dinle
- Dynasty: Garen-Muzaffarid
- Religion: Islam
- Military career
- Conflicts: Second Italo-Ethiopian War; Battle of Ganale Doria; Battle of the Ogaden

Olol Dinle (Somali: Olol Diinle) was a Somali sultan who ruled Kelafo as the head of the Ajuran. He successively offered allegiance to the Kingdom of Italy in the 1920s and was named "Sultan of Sciavelli (Shabelle) and Auia (Hawiye)" in the early 1930s.

Olol Dinle was crowned sultan in 1922 and his Sultanate was out of the upper reaches of the Webi Shabelle, centered at Kelafo, the traditional capital at the turn of the 20th century. After Ethiopian Empire invaded his traditional territory, Sultan Olol Dinle sought the alliance of Italy in the 1920s.

== Life ==
Sultan Olol Dinle descended from both the Ajuran whose deeds were lost in the mists of time and the dynasty that ruled the Mogadishu Sultanate.

The expansion of Ethiopian control deep into the Ogaden led to the capture of Kelafo, leaving Olol Dinle with a very small patch of territory on the Ethiopian side of the border between Ferfer and Kelafo. This tiny patch of land along the Shabelle River was strategically critical, however, as any invasion of Ethiopia from central or southern Somaliland would have to go through this area. Sultan Orfa was placed in control of Kelafo, but Olol Dinle's attacks against Ethiopian forces were so serious that Ethiopian government intervention was required to avoid famine along the Shabelle.

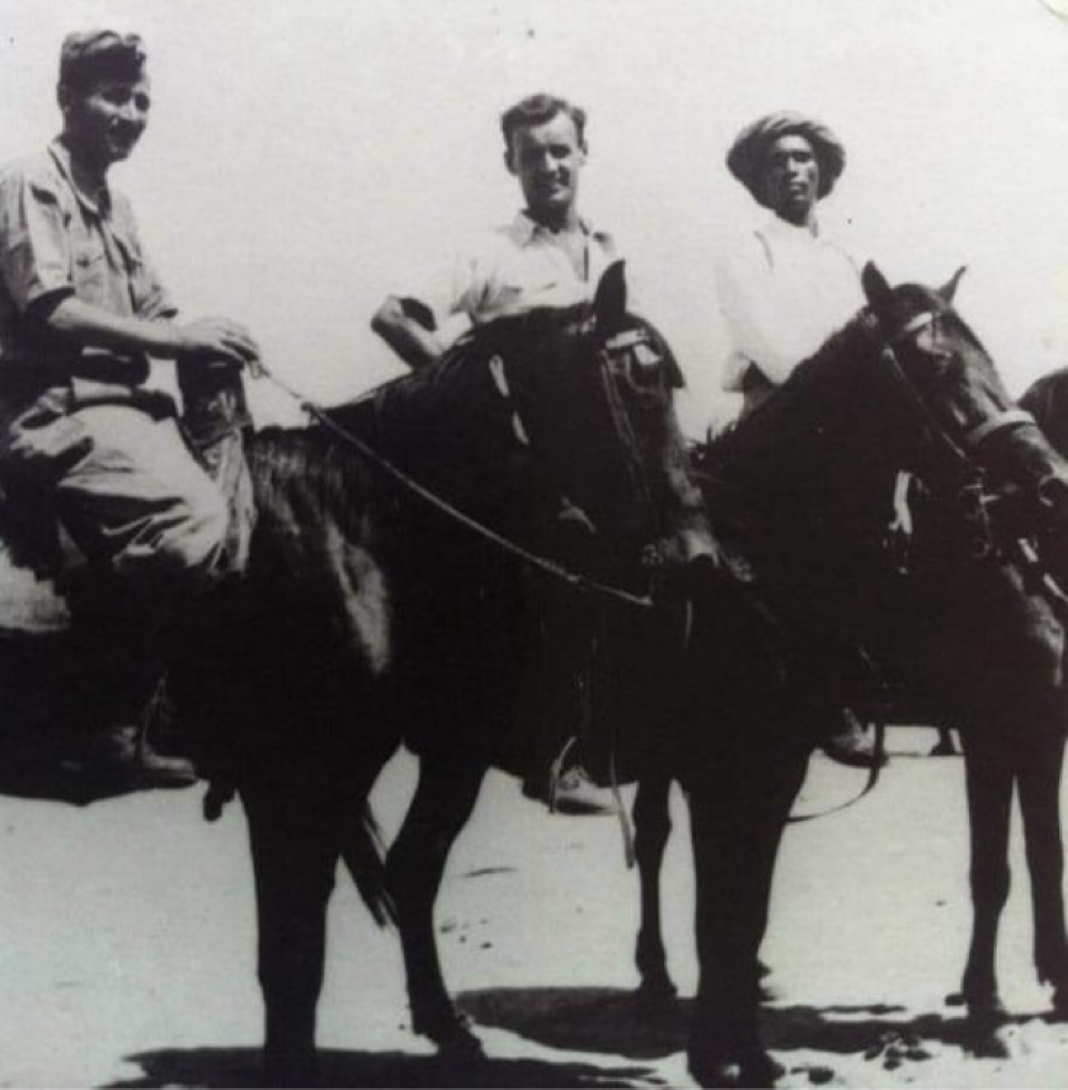
Olol Dinle on horseback accompanied with two Italian soldiers

In recognition of Italy's alliance with Olol Dinle, he was dubbed the "Sultan of the Sciaveli (Shabelle)" in the 1930s. Ethiopia took to supporting Omar Samatar's raids into Italian Somaliland, the former general of the Sultanate of Hobyo seeking a similar goal as that of Olol Dinle in that he sought to reinstate Majerteen clan rule in Hobyo. In 1931, the Dejazmach ("Commander of the Gate") of Harar, Gebremariam, to whom the Ogaden had been assigned, attacked and destroyed Olol Dinle's fortress at Mustahil and threatened the Italian Rezidenza at Beledweyne. The Italians hastily mustered up Italian reinforcements but an open armed confrontation with Gebremariam was avoided and the Ethiopians withdrew. During the actions against the Abyssinians carried out by him in 1933 and 1934. He moved away from Italian Somaliland while leading a small group of his people, engaged in an all-out fight against the Abyssinian garrisons settled in his country. Sultan Olol had absolutely promised our colonial authorities that he would succeed in driving the Abyssinians out of the Shabelle territory, which "was the land of his ancestors." The alliance of Sultan Olol to Italy dates back a long time. He did this to seek protection from the Abbissinian Empire that was bent on colonizing the rest of Somali territories, hating the Abyssinians colonial intentions, have sought the support of Italy to protect his land and people. The blows that Olol inflicted on the Ethiopians were numerous and extremely bloody. He even managed to capture a cannon, a machine gun, and hundreds of rifles, which are now displayed as trophies in the beautiful Museum of Mogadishu, established in the restored Garesa and reorganized by the Somali history scholar Francesco Saverio Caroselli.

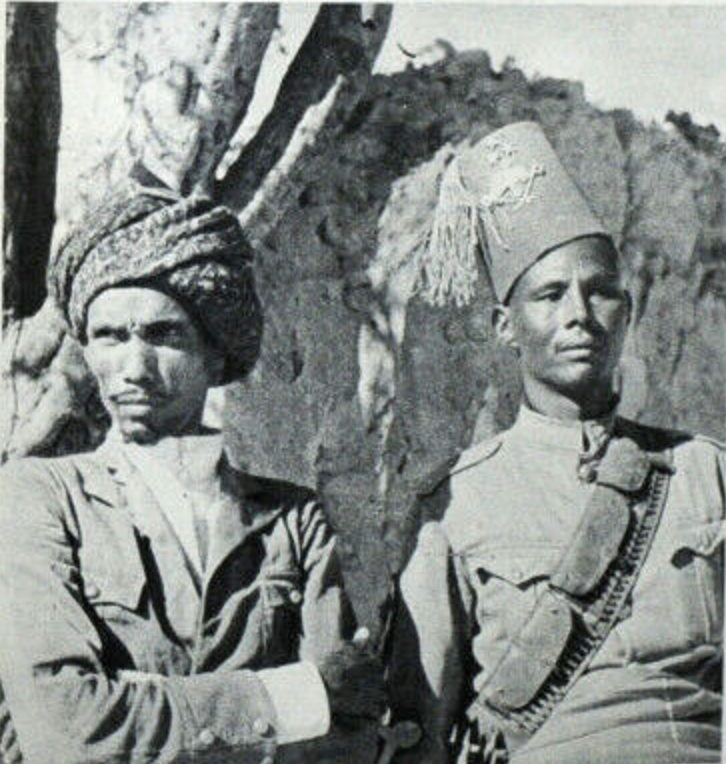
Sultan Olol Dinle in military attire with his personal dubat

In response to Menelik’s invasions at the end of the 19th century, Olol Dinle was able to unite the Muslims of the region against Ethiopia and what they deemed was a blatant invasion by Amhara nationalists. When the Italian invasion of Ethiopia went underway in 1935, many Somalis were only eager to assist. In the Battle of Ganale Doria, the 5,000 strong Army of Bale alongside the 20,000 strong Army of Sidamo, under Dejazmach Beine Merid and Ras Desta, was to advance down the Shebelle River and invade the center of Somalia. The bulk of the Bale army, under Beine Merid, along with a strong detachment of Hararghe troops, was sent to counter Olol Dinle's advance. Ras Desta's forces advanced in three columns. Two columns were led by his two Fitauris (Note: Roughly equivalent to Commander of the Vanguard.) Ademe Anbassu and Tademme Zelleka. Kenyazmach (Note: Roughly equivalent to Commander of the Right Wing, also spelled Qegnazmach.) Bezibeh Sileshi commanded a relatively modern guards battalion. The Army of the Bale was able to move forward more quickly due to the better terrain in its area. In November, forces loyal to Sultan Olol Dinle pushed 350 kilometers inside Ethiopia, Olol Dinle clashed with the forces of Ras Desta's Army of Bale and Dejazmach Beine Merid at Goba, and destroying all the villages supporting the Ethiopian government. The Ethiopians clashed with about 1,000 dubats of the pro-Italian Sultan Olol Dinle. Both sides eventually withdrew from the battlefield, with Beine Merid seriously wounded. Its commander stricken, the army of the Bale retreated, leaving the army of the Sidamo was on its own. Olol Dinle managed to complete the main objective of his mission which was to immobilise Beine Merid. With their leader out of action, the Ethiopians’ morale cracked: a presage of what was invariably to happen in this war. Olol Dinle meanwhile raided north and captured Dagnerrei, where his own cousin Hamil Badel had been appointed district governor by the Emperor. Hamil Badel was taken prisoner, and offered a sumptuous tent, a fine dinner, and women. That night he was strangled on Olol Dinle’s order by his own brother.

Meanwhile, Italian General Graziani was preparing an offensive aimed at dislodging Abyssinian forces from their positions on the Dawa Parma. Dinle then led irregular bands along the upper course of the Webi Shebelle River, advancing into the Imi region. This movement allowed for reconnaissance of the area and diverted hostile forces away from reinforcing Ras Desta's troops. On his return, Dinle’s column occupied Danano in the Bawa Valley, where they joined forces with Hassan Ali, Chief of the Ogaden Rer Dalal tribe, who had pledged allegiance to the Italians.

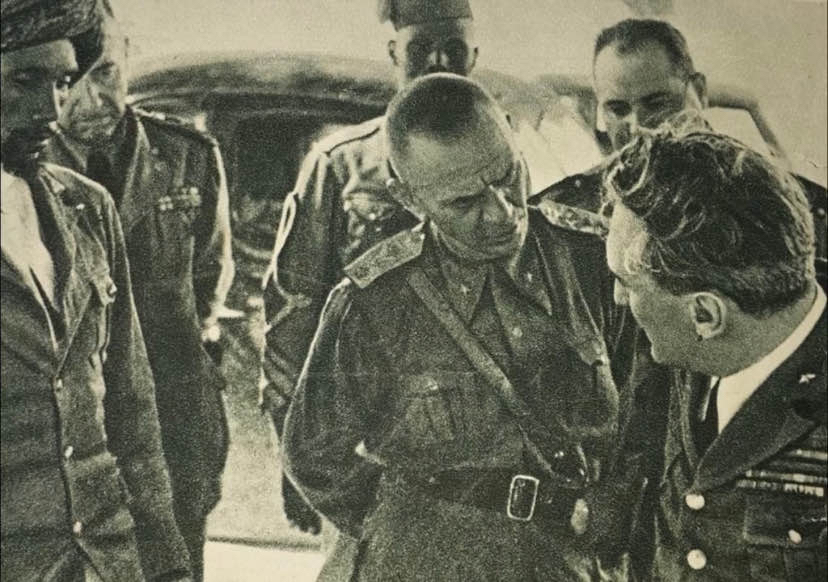
General Graziani makes agreements with General Frusci and the Sultan Olol Dinle for the action on Imi.

On December 10, a strategic reconnaissance was launched with Olol Dinle's bands along the Webi Shebeli River, heading towards Imi. By late November, it was learned that Beiene Merid was between the Gestro and Webi Shebeli Rivers, near Mount Ellot, with strong contingents marching along the Gestro. As a result, Olol Dinle was ordered not to proceed to Imi but to move into the recently subdued territory of the Ghelimes and then march on Ellot to attack the forces descending from the Gestro from behind, which could cause significant trouble to our right flank in case of a counteroffensive along the Doria River. A column under Bertello, already concentrated at Goddere, would also support Olol Dinle’s action. At the same time Graziani intercepted a panicky wireless message from Dejaz Nasibu to the Emperor predicting that Olol's force was Graziani's advance guard.

On December 23, Olol Dinle arrived at Gabba. On the 24th and 25th, three enemy columns marched against him: one along the Webi Shebeli, one from Mount Ellot, and another from the southwest, from Barrei, aiming to cut off his retreat. Although free to withdraw, Olol Dinle decided to fortify his position and requested air support. The resulting "Christmas battles" caused heavy losses for his forces, also due to the hostile local population. Nevertheless, the enemy, having lost at least a thousand men, retreated. On the opposing side, it was feared that Olol Dinle’s bands were merely the vanguard of a larger force advancing from the Webi Shebeli. Nasibu was alarmed, and fearing for Harar, motorized troops were dispatched from Shoa to the Errer Valley. Marshal Graziani wrote: "Wehib has lost both his bearings and his mind," and indeed, he told a foreign journalist that he couldn’t understand where the enemy armies in the South were or what the Command wanted to do: "With this, the war becomes impossible to conduct!" This phrase echoes Ferravilla's quip in the duel of Sur Panera: "If he doesn’t stand still, how can I stab him?"

In the Battle of the Ogaden, Nasi’s Eritreans and Olol Dinle’s Ajurans beat the men of Wollega, and of Gemugofa, and of Kulu who had travelled so far to fight. Where men on foot fought with men on foot, the battle swayed homerically first to one side, then to another. But Nasi had formed two mechanized columns on the right, and as these columns encircled their rear Dejazmach Abebe and Dejazmach Makonnen pulled back.

The Italians impressed by his magnificent conduct which stood out more and more stated that he is worthy of the ancient Islamic invaders of Ethiopia and certainly has the blood of Ahmad ibn Ibrahim al-Ghazi in his veins. Likening him to the latter ascending the plateau victorious and saw the Shewan priests kissing his feet, he shouted: "These people were born as slaves, it is necessary to free them from its leaders and the false gods that they worship." Sultan Olol Dinle's forces of about 1,000 dubats defeated a 5,000 strong army led by Dejazmach Beine Merid. This victory was the reason Sultan Olol Dinle was invited to Italy in 1938. Along with many indigenous nobles who were restored, Dinle was made paramount ruler of the Ogaden.

== Death ==
Sultan Olol Dinle was executed during the early 1960s in Addis Ababa by Haile Salassie due to accusations of him collaborating with the Italians against Ethiopia. He allegedly was a “loyal ally” of Italy, and regularly used to betray the imperial government of Ethiopia. However, oral history suggests he died in 1978.

== See also ==
- Second Italo-Ethiopian War
- Ajuran Sultanate
- Italian East Africa
