= Rer Bare people =

Ethnic group of eastern Ethiopia

The Reer Barre (or Rer Shabelle) are a tribe in the Gedo region of the Ethiopia-Ogaden region on the Shabele River, near Somalia, who currently speak Somali. Historically farmers, a small number of Reer Barre are pastoralist, mostly keeping cows and goats and are usually residents of eastern cities of Ethiopia, such as Jijiga, Gode, Kelafo, Far-libah, Feerfeer, Mustahiil, along with more cities and towns in different parts of the Somali Regional state of Ethiopia. These tribes are unknown to the government of Ethiopia so far, regardless of the country's ethnic based federalism who has no stock of its ethnic group. They are a large family who also have a large population in the Shabelle region, Somalia. Reer means "family".

== Language and origins ==
Rer Bare
- Rerebere
- (unattested)
- Native to: Ethiopia
- Region: Ogaden
- Ethnicity: Rer Bare
- Extinct: (date missing)
- Language family: unclassified

Language codes
- ISO 639-3: rer
- Glottolog: rerb1235

Their unattested but apparently non-Somali language seems to have been first mentioned in print by Lionel Bender in 1975:

D. W. Mcclure, Sr. first reported to me the presence of Sudanese immigrants on the Wabi Shebelle River at Gode in the eastern Ogaden. They are said to have their own language, bearing the given name [Rerebere]. Later Taye Reya informed me that Sudanese immigrants are found along the Ganale and Dawa Rivers as well, and that they are referred to by the Somali as rer bare (rer means sub-tribe in Somali.) They are also known as adona, and they speak Somali as well as their own language... I cannot say with certainty whether they speak one or more languages of what any of them is... So far no linguistic data has come my way.

Others have linked the Reer Barre to the Bantu language family, implying that they may be the remnants of a Bantu-speaking pre-Somali population or, like the "Somali Bantu" in the Jubba River valley of southern Somalia, the descendants of Bantu slaves imported from other parts of East Africa in the 19th century, but this one seems to be false. Tobias Hagmann refers to them as "Somalised Bantu". According to Ulrich Braukämper:

The Adonē, a dark-skinned Somali-speaking population on the banks of the Wabi Shäbälle, are obviously the offspring of Bantu slaves who settled and expanded there since the 19th century.

A British hunter, Colonel Swayne, who visited Imi in February 1893, relates that he was the guest of Gabba Oboho, a chief of the Dubo clan, for several days.

== Bibliography ==
- Bender, M. L. The Ethiopian Nilo-Saharans. Artistic Printers, Addis Ababa 1975.
