= Buur Ukur =

Buur Ukur Buur Cukur Buur Ramadan
- somalis
- Nickname: Buur Ramadan
- Location within Ethiopia
- Coordinates: 5.0723°N 44.9138°E
- Country: Ethiopia
- Region: Somali
- Zone: Gode
- Elevation: 1,609 m (5,279 ft)
- Time zone: UTC+3 (EAT)

Buur Ukur (also written Buur Cukur, Bur Ukur, Burukur, Buurukur) is the name of both a town and the surrounding low-lying region in Ethiopia's Gode Zone in the Somali Region.

== Overview ==
It is located on the eastern shore of the Shabelle River, close to the region's main town, Mustahīl (Mustaxiil), and the Somali border town of Ferfer.
