= Chereti (woreda) =

Woreda in the Somali Region of Ethiopia

Coordinates: 5.339720°N 41.882458°E

Chereti or Jarati or Weyib is one of the woredas in the Somali Region of Ethiopia, named after its major town, Melka Chireti. Part of the Afder Zone, Chereti is bordered on the southwest by the Ganale Dorya River which separates it from the Liben Zone, on the west by Goro Bekeksa, on the north by Elekere, on the east by Afder, and on the southeast by Dolobay.of in somalia region Melka Chireti (Jarati / Jano) – History & Background

Location & Establishment Melka Chireti, also known as Jarati (Jano), is a town located in the Afder Zone, in the southeastern part of the Somali Regional State of Ethiopia. • The town was founded in 1925. • It has always been recognized as a commercial hub, historically linked to the trade routes of Mogadishu, Somalia. • It lies along the main highway of the Somali Region, starting from Jarati and connecting to the Somali Galbeed areas.

Agriculture & Economy The surrounding fertile lands make Jarati one of the notable agricultural centers in the region. The main crops produced include: • Onions • Bananas • Papaya • Mangoes • Sesame • Watermelon

Notable Figures & Leadership The town has been shaped by influential elders and leaders, such as:

Geography & Layout • The town is geographically split by a river into two main parts: • Tuula Bay (towards Hargele) • Jarati Bay (towards Diilhara) • Jarati is connected by four main roads, with a fifth road under development, linking it to: • Laami Ciida (main asphalt road) • hargelle in the Ma’no/Diilhara area • Dolo Ado • Hargele • Qoroxey

Culture & Sports • The town is well known for football (soccer), where strong competitions take place with surrounding towns. • It also hosts large livestock markets and camel trade fairs, attracting people from across the region.

Comparison with Other Towns Jarati is considered older and more established than several other Somali Regional towns such as Dhagaxbuur and Qabridahare.

== Overview ==
The altitude of this woreda ranges from 750 to 1700 meters above sea level. Other rivers in Chereti include the Mena and the Weyib. As of 2008, Chereti has 62 kilometers of all-weather gravel road and 440 kilometers of community roads; in which around 8.69% of the total population has access to drinking water.

Flooding was reported in Chereti in May 2006, which destroyed around 9 villages and displaced more than 870 households. More than 4,500 shoats were also reported drowned by the flooding.

Major towns in Chereti include:- Hara-arba, Habal-allan, Gurro, Bardumey, Iligdheere & Dukanle.

== Demographics ==
Based on the 2007 Census conducted by the Central Statistical Agency of Ethiopia (CSA), this woreda has a total population of 94,295, of whom 53,341 are men and 40,954 women. While 5,152 or 5.46% are urban inhabitants, a further 53,715 or 56.97% are pastoralists. 99.3% of the population said they were Muslim. The majority of the inhabitants belong to Dhawed sub clan of Gaadsan (Dir).
