= Bare (woreda) =

Woreda in Somali Region, Ethiopia

Coordinates: 5°10′N 43°45′E

Bare (Somali: Barre) is one of the woredas in the Somali Region of Ethiopia. Part of the Afder Zone, Bare is bordered on the south by the Provisional Administrative Line with Somalia, on the west by Dolobay, on the north by Afder, and on the east by the Gode Zone. The major town in this woreda is Bare.

== Demographics ==
Based on the 2007 Census conducted by the Central Statistical Agency of Ethiopia (CSA), this woreda has a total population of 93,340, of whom 56,253 are men and 37,087 women. While 8,117 or 8.7% are urban inhabitants, a further 62,506 or 66.97% are pastoralists. 98.98% of the population said they were Muslim. This woreda is primarily inhabited by the Daarood, Dir and Hawiye clans of the Somali people.

The 1997 national census reported a total population for this woreda of 80,797, of whom 46,319 were men and 34,478 were women; 5,124 or 6.34% of its population were urban dwellers. The largest ethnic group reported in Bare was the Somali people (99.94%).
