= Elekere =

Coordinates: 6°00′N 42°05′E

Elekere (also transliterated El Kere) or Serer is one of the woredas in the Somali Region of Ethiopia. Part of the Afder Zone, Elekere is bordered on the southeast by Afder, on the southwest by Cherti, on the west by Goro Bekeksa, on the north by Mirab Imi, and on the east by Gode Zone. The major town in Elekere is El Kere.

High points in this woredas include the peaks of the Audo Range, which runs from the northwest to the southeast parallel to the Shebelle River.

== Demographics ==
Based on the 2007 Census conducted by the Central Statistical Agency of Ethiopia (CSA), this woreda has a total population of 108,735, of whom 32,696 are men and 25,039 women. While 1,777 or 3.08% are urban inhabitants, a further 13,261 or 22.97% are pastoralists. 98.88% of the population said they were Muslim.

The 1997 national census reported a total population for this woreda of 33,034, of whom 17,720 are men and 15,314 are women; 1,1023 or 3.1% of its population were urban dwellers. The two largest ethnic groups reported in Elekere were the Somali people as main gariire subclan of dir (92.71%) and the Oromo (7.24%); the census report classified 0.05% were all who were identified as Afar, Amhara, and Shita.
