= Imiberi =

Imiberi (Somali: Iimeey Bari) is one of the woredas in the Somali Region of Ethiopia. Part of the Gode Zone, Imiberi is bordered on the southwest by the Shebelle River which separates it from the Afder Zone, on the north by the Fiq Zone, on the east by Danan, and on the southeast by Gode. The largest town in this woreda is East Imi.

== Demographics ==
Based on the 2007 Census conducted by the Central Statistical Agency of Ethiopia (CSA), this woreda has a total population of 81,721, of whom 45,540 are men and 36,181 women. While 11,403 or 13.95% are urban inhabitants, a further 14,277 or 17.47% are pastoralists. 99.31% of the population said they were Muslim.
