= Battle of Ganale Doria =

1936 battle of the Second Italo-Abyssinian War

Battle of Genale Doria
- Part of the Second Italo-Ethiopian War
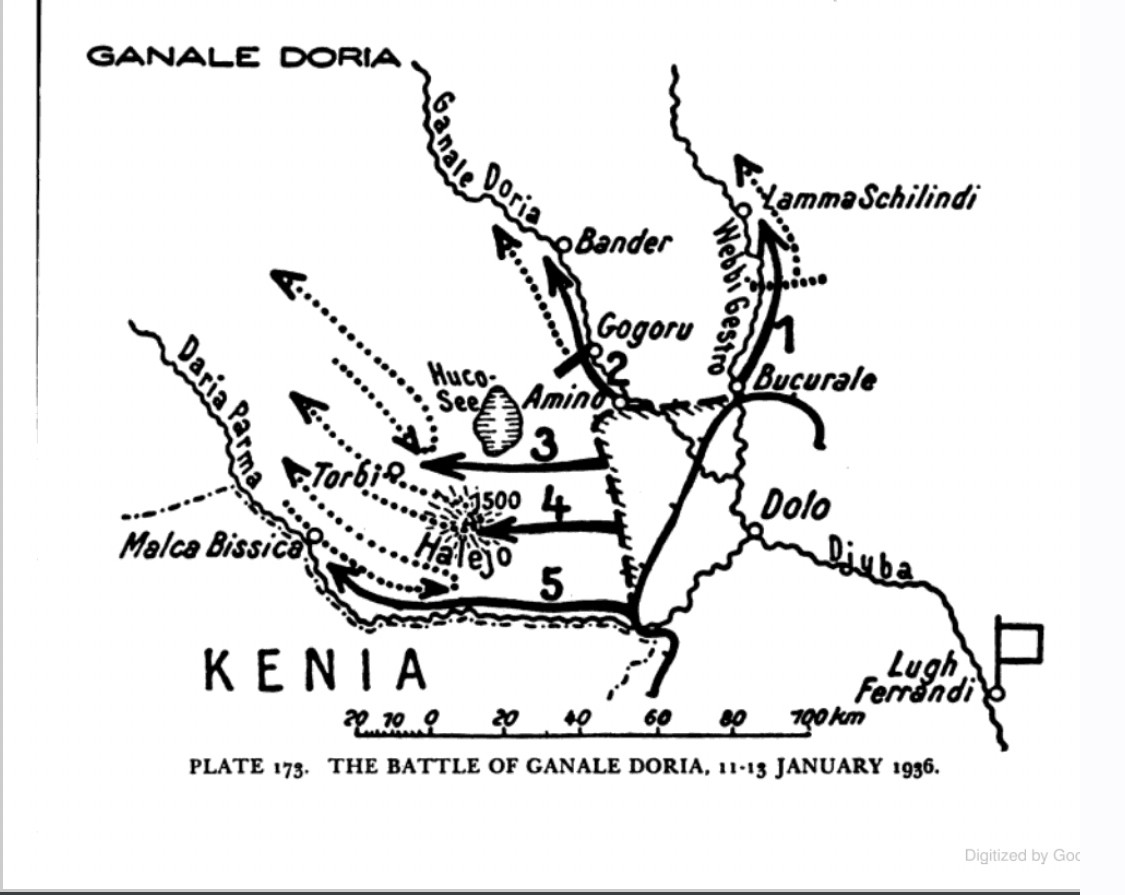
- Battle of Ganale Doria from 11-13 January 1936
Date	12 January–20 January 1936
Location	Valley of the Genale Doria River, Ethiopia
Result	Italian victory

Belligerents
Italy	Ethiopia

Commanders and leaders
(Kingdom of Italy) Rodolfo Graziani (Kingdom of Italy) Olol Dinle (Kingdom of Italy) Pietro Maletti	(Ethiopian Empire) Desta Damtew (Ethiopian Empire) Beine Merid

Units involved
29th Infantry Division; Libyan Division; 6th CC.NN. Division	Army of Sidamo; Army of Bale

Strength
20,000	24,000

Casualties and losses
900 killed or wounded	5,000+ killed

The Battle of Ganale Doria (also known as the Battle of Genale Dorya or as the Battle of Genale Wenz) took place in 1936 during the Second Italo-Abyssinian War. It was fought on the "southern front". The battle consisted largely of air attacks by the Italian Royal Air Force (Regia Aeronautica), under the command of General Rodolfo Graziani, against an advancing and then withdrawing Ethiopian army under Ras (Note: Roughly equivalent to Duke and Commander of the Army.) Desta Damtu. The battle was primarily fought in the area along the Genale Doria River valley between Dolo and Negele Boran.

Ras Damtew launched an Ethiopian offensive against the Italian forces in Italian Somaliland. However, Graziani carried out his active defense so vigorously that it became an offensive.

== Background ==
In early 1935 Italian forces were preparing to invade Ethiopia from Eritrea. Only one Italian division, the 29th Infantry Division "Peloritana", had been allotted to the southern front, while the northern front had ten. General Rodolfo Graziani was in charge of the southern front; his role was expected to be entirely defensive. His orders from General Emilio De Bono were to dig in and wait for the Ethiopians to attack.

Graziani set out to convince De Bono's commander, Italian dictator Benito Mussolini, that the plans for the campaign needed to be changed to allow him and his army on the southern front to play a more active role. Mussolini wanted action and was willing to listen. In the end, Graziani's plan for an offensive on the "southern front" had the tacit approval of Rome if not De Bono. Between April and December, Graziani opened up new roads, developed the port facilities at Mogadishu, solved a difficult water supply problem, stocked up provisions and munitions, and purchased hundreds of motor vehicles. He successfully acquired American-made trucks from British dealers in Mombasa and Dar es Salaam.

On 3 October 1935, when De Bono launched his invasion in the north without a declaration of war Graziani was logistically prepared for an advance on Harar in the south. However, Graziani's forces were still relatively few in number and they faced an enemy numbering approximately 80,000 strong. In addition to numbers, the soldiers of the two principle Ethiopian armies on the "southern front" were said to be better trained and better equipped than the soldiers of the armies De Bono faced in the north. The Ethiopian commanders in the south were young, progressive, and loyal; dedicated to Haile Selassie's cause.

== Institution of the Milan plan ==
When De Bono's forces crossed the Mareb River in the north, Graziani instituted what he called the Milan Plan in the south. The initial objectives of this plan were to eliminate Ethiopian frontier posts and to test the Ethiopian reaction to a series of probes. Despite the incessant rains, within three weeks the Italians had captured the villages of Kelafo, Dagnerai, Gerlogubi, and Gorahai. (Note: Also transliterated as Qorahy.)

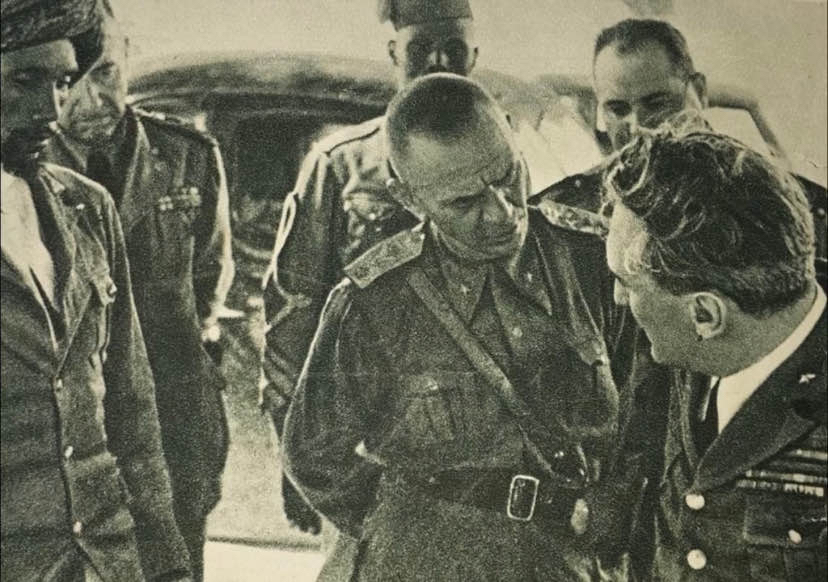
General Graziani makes agreements with General Frusci and the Sultan Olol Dinle for the action on Imi.

Gorahai, the most important of the villages, was known as an old stronghold of the Dervish movement and Diriye Gure's emir, called the "Mad Mullah" by the British. With approximately 3,000 fighters under his command, Grazmach (Note: Roughly equivalent to Commander of the Left Wing.) and Balambaras (Note: Roughly equivalent to Commander of the Fortress.) Afawarq Walda Samayat (Note: Afawarq Walda Samayat is simply identified as Afewerk by A. J. Barker and as Azaye Afework by Time magazine.) had turned Gorahai into an armed camp. Capronis of the Italian Royal Air Force (the Regia Aeronautica) regularly bombed Gorahai and Afawarq himself directed the fire of the lone anti-aircraft gun, a 37 mm Oerlikon. The gun was mounted in one of the old-style turrets of the Mad Mullah's antiquated fort. During one of the regular bombings, Afawarq was seriously wounded. He refused to be taken to the hospital because he feared that the morale of his men would suffer in his absence. Within 48-hours the wound became gangrenous and Afawarq collapsed and died. He was posthumously promoted to Dejazmach (Note: Roughly equivalent to Commander of the Gate.) by the Emperor.

Afawarq was correct about the morale of his men and, after his death, they abandoned Gorahai. After taking the position, Graziani sent a flying column under Colonel Pietro Maletti to catch and harass the fleeing Ethiopians. Maletti caught up with the Ethiopians only to have them turn back and attack. At Anale, the Ethiopian force fleeing from Gorahai was joined by a relief force sent to reinforce the garrison at Gorahai. A meeting encounter ensued and casualties were high among the Ethiopians and the Italians. After several hours, both sides withdrew and both claimed victory. While better equipped in all ways, the Italians were never able to get the upper hand. The small two-man, turretless L3/35 tankettes sent against the Ethiopians quickly bogged down in the rough terrain and were put out of action by Ethiopians who crept up on them and fired through the weapon slits in the armor.

The Italians advanced 145 miles in four days. This brought them almost within striking distance of Jijiga, Harar, and Ethiopia's only railway. But the forces available to Graziani remained limited and by November the initiative on the southern front passed to the Ethiopians, as it did in the north.

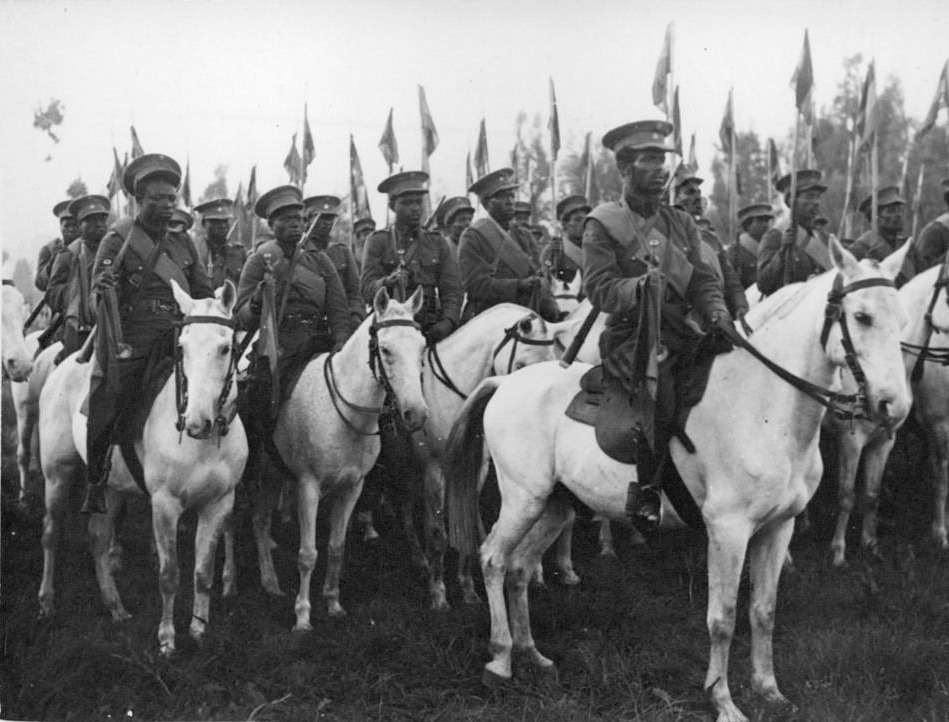
Ethiopian soldiers in 1936

On 13 November Graziani moved his headquarters to Baidoa. The 29th Infantry Division "Peloritana" was still the only full division available to him. By mid-November limited elements of the Libyan Colonial Division and the 6th CC.NN. Division "Tevere" were in Somalia. As additional forces arrived later in November, Graziani formed them up at Dolo near the border. By early December, Graziani's forces were in a state of readiness to launch a counterattack against Ras Desta's offensive and Graziani's new commander, Marshal of Italy Pietro Badoglio, noted this preparedness. Badoglio sent Graziani a telegram reminding him of his "strictly defensive" role. Graziani feigned compliance with Badoglio but communicated privately with Rome and urged that he be given authorization for an offensive. Mussolini gave Graziani permission for "a limited attack in the case of absolute necessity" and Graziani took this as the authorization he needed.

Ras Desta descended from the Bale Plateau, assembling the Army of the Sidamo at Negele Boran (Note: Also spelled Neghelli.). This army was considered to be well armed by Ethiopia standards and numbered approximately 20,000 men. His goal was to advance down the Ganale Dorya River and to then continue his advance down the Juba River. From Negele Boran, Ras Desta planned to march approximately 200 miles south and capture the border town of Dolo, then invade Italian Somaliland itself. This plan was ill-conceived and overly ambitious. It also lost the element of surprise as it became common knowledge and was the subject of marketplace gossip. In addition to the Army of the Sidamo, the 4,000 strong Army of the Bale, under Dejazmach Beine Merid, was to advance down the Shebelle River and invade the center of Somalia. The bulk of the Bale army, under Beine Merid, along with a strong detachment of Hararghe troops, was sent to counter Olol Dinle's advance.

Ras Desta's forces advanced in three columns. Two columns were led by his two Fitauris (Note: Roughly equivalent to Commander of the Vanguard.) Ademe Anbassu and Tademme Zelleka. Kenyazmach (Note: Roughly equivalent to Commander of the Right Wing, also spelled Qegnazmach.) Bezibeh Sileshi commanded a relatively modern guards battalion. The Army of the Bale was able to move forward more quickly due to the better terrain in its area. In November, advancing elements of this force clashed with about 1,000 dubats of the pro-Italian Sultan Olol Dinle. Both sides eventually withdrew from the battlefield, with Beine Merid seriously wounded. Its commander stricken, the army of the Bale retreated, leaving the army of the Sidamo was on its own. Olol Dinle managed to complete the main objective of his mission which was to immobilise Beine Merid. Meanwhile, Italian General Graziani was preparing an offensive aimed at dislodging Abyssinian forces from their positions on the Dawa Parma. Dinle then led irregular bands along the upper course of the Webi Shebeli River, advancing into the Imi region. This movement allowed for reconnaissance of the area and diverted hostile forces away from reinforcing Ras Desta's troops. On his return, Dinle’s column occupied Danano in the Bawa Valley, where they joined forces with Hassan Ali, Chief of the Ogaden Rar Dalal tribe, who had pledged allegiance to the Italians.

== Battle ==
Even as the Ethiopians advanced, Graziani continued his preparations. He organized his forces into three columns. On the Italian right was the first column which was to advance up the valley of the Genale Doria River. In the center was the second column which was to advance towards Filtu. On the left was the third column which was to advance up the valley of the Dawa River. All three columns had access to motor transport and were equipped with a few tanks. They could be thought of as "mechanized" by the standards of 1936. In addition to the three columns on the ground, Graziani had at his disposal the 7th Bomber Wing of the Royal Air Force.

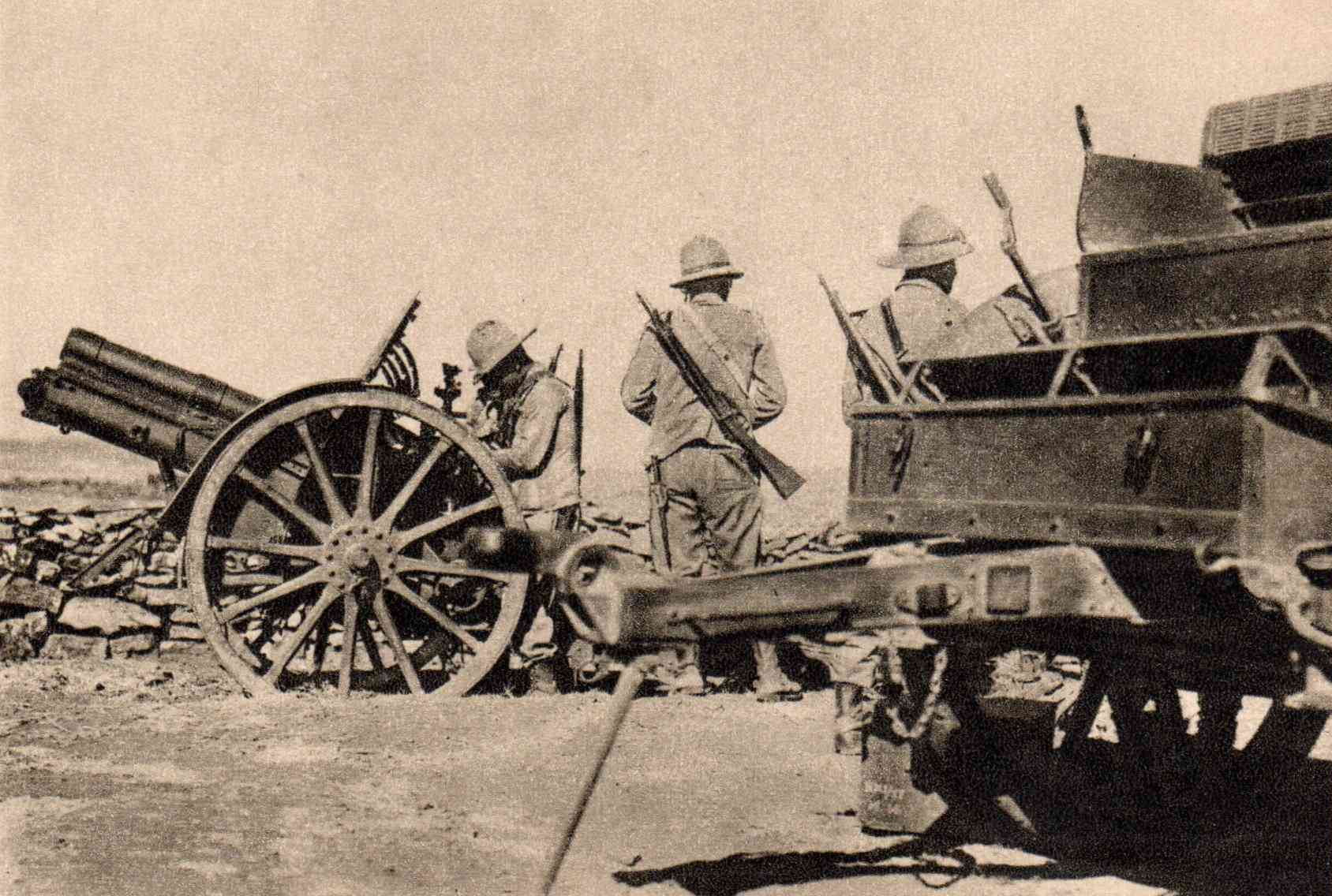
Italian artillery in Ethiopia in 1936

Protected by the action of the Royal Air Force, Graziani launched the counteroffensive on 10 January 1936; the plan was to divide his troops into three columns: the first, under the command of Lieutenant General Augusto Agostini, had the objective of going up the Daua Parma as far as Malca Murri to cut off the route of the Ethiopians, preventing them from taking refuge in Kenya or receiving supplies from across the border; the second, in the centre, under the command of Colonel Francesco De Martini, was to reach Filtù on the road leading to Negele; the third, on the right, under the command of General Annibale Bergonzoli, was to reach Bander by going up the Ganale Doria; two smaller columns finally had secondary objectives further north.

The Italian mechanized columns advanced with a series of out-flanking maneuvers, in about four days the enemy lines were broken and this allowed Graziani to take advantage of the situation and head the central column, which he had placed himself in the charge towards Negele. In the meantime the air force continued to bombard the fleeing enemies with explosives and gas. The enemies, gripped by hunger and thirst, tried in every way to reach Negele or the rivers, being repeatedly intercepted and killed by the lateral columns. At 11.50 on 19 January the first fast vanguards entered Negele, slightly ahead of Graziani, and the news of the conquest of the town spread throughout Italy on 22 January arousing great enthusiasm throughout the country, especially because after almost three months of war it was the first real success in Africa, accompanied by the total liquidation of Desta's army.

== Aftermath ==
On 20 January, within five days of their start, all three of Graziani's columns had reached their objectives. As a testament to the thoroughness of the job that the Royal Air Force had done, no shots were fired when the Italians converged on and entered their ultimate objective, Negele Boran. The rout of Ras Desta's army was complete. On 24 January, during the mopping up actions which followed, Graziani gave orders to the air commander: "Burn and destroy all that is inflammable and destructible ... bomb neighboring woods with gas and incendiaries." Mussolini said that there was to be no truce. Ras Desta fled by mule to Addis Ababa, narrowly escaping capture.

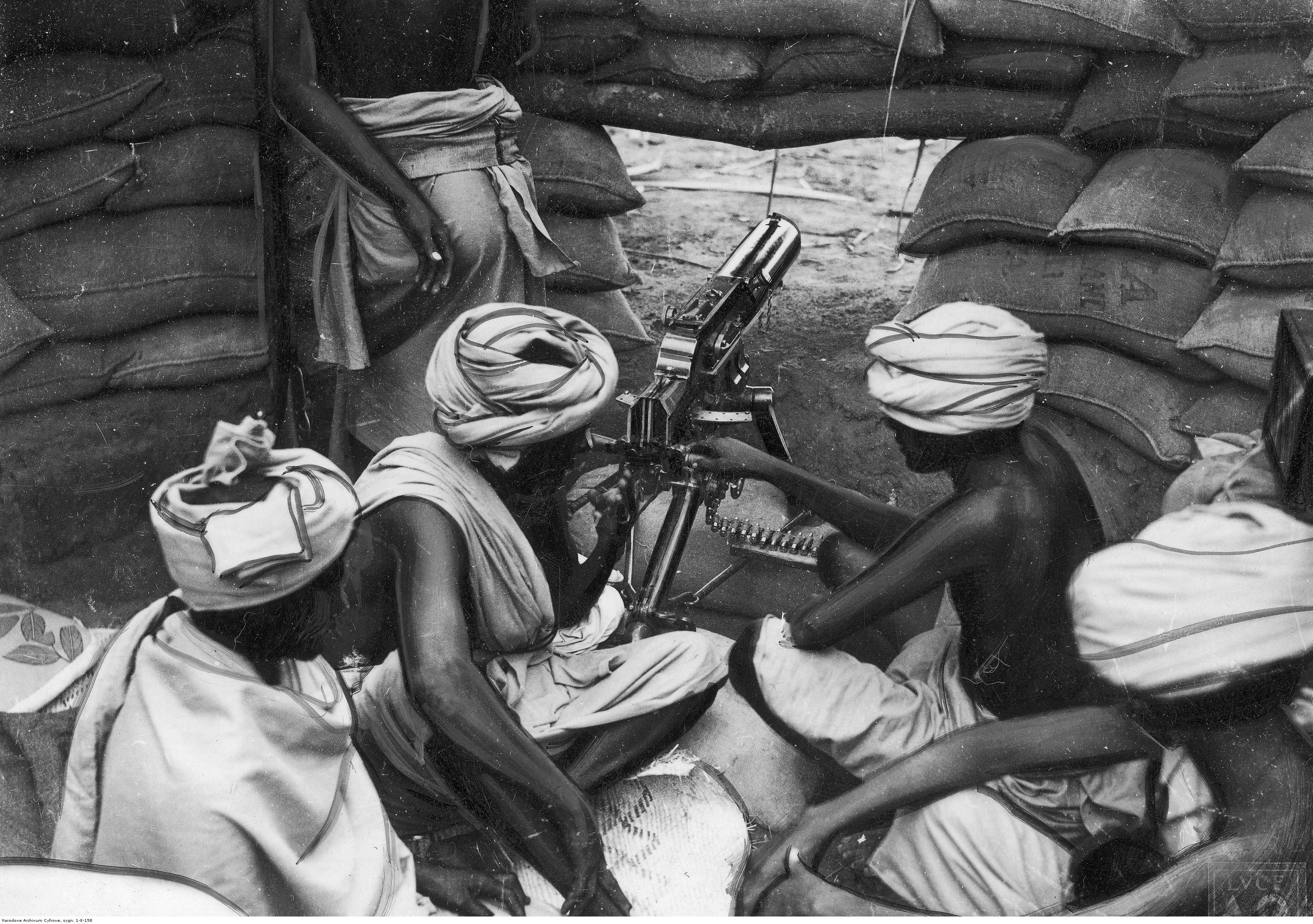
A Dubat checkpoint at Dolo in 1936

One detail did detract from Graziani's triumph. About halfway through the battle, over nine hundred of his Eritrean troops deserted. Graziani's response was to order the corpses of the Eritrean dead left to rot on the field where they fell. Over 1,000 Eritrean deserters were said to have fought on the Ethiopian side at the Battle of Maychew.

Having taken the ground intended and having reached Wadera, Graziani now cautiously withdrew his forces approximately 60 miles to Negele Boran to allow food and munitions to catch up. The southern front was the subordinate front and the war on the northern front was not yet going well for the Italians. The Christmas Offensive was pressing the Italians hard, and they had priority for supplies and reinforcements.

== See also ==
- Ethiopian Order of Battle Second Italo-Abyssinian War
- Army of the Ethiopian Empire
- List of Second Italo-Ethiopian War weapons of Ethiopia
- Italian Order of Battle Second Italo-Abyssinian War
- Royal Italian Army
- List of Italian military equipment in the Second Italo-Ethiopian War

== Notes ==
Footnotes

Citations
