= Mustahil (woreda) =

District in Somali Region, Ethiopia

Coordinates: 5°25′N 44°45′E

Mustahil (Somali: Mustaxiil) is a woreda in the Somali Region of Ethiopia. Part of the Gode Zone, Mustahil is bordered on the south by Somalia, on the west by Kelafo, on the north by the Korahe Zone, and on the east by Ferfer. The Shebelle River is flowing through this woreda. The major town in this woreda is Mustahīl.

The average elevation in this woreda is 310 meters above sea level. As of 2008, Mustahil has no all-weather gravel road nor any community roads; about 7.96% of the total population has access to drinking water. Mustahil woreda currently has had good progress and the local government workers have harvested about 50 hectares of Sudan grass so the woreda could help other drought areas.

== Mustahil floodings ==
Mustahil was heavily affected by the flash floods in Ethiopia during September 2006, the worst of any woreda in the Somali Region. An initial assessment by Ethiopian authorities found that 45,000 people were affected by the flooding; more recent numbers reported for this woreda were two people and 5,400 livestock killed and 1,440 hectares of cropland ruined.

The October 2007 flooding affected 26,825 people in this woreda, displacing approximately 6,000, and devastating kebeles that had not been affected in the worst flooding of 2006. These kebeles included Budul, Jagi, Fagug, and Iman Ise. Moreover, grazing land, water sources and approximately 5,630 hectares of crop land were reportedly destroyed by flood waters in Mustahil and Kelafo, which further exacerbated the already fragile food security of the region.

== Demographics ==
Based on the 2007 Census conducted by the Central Statistical Agency of Ethiopia (CSA), this woreda has a total population of 49,315, of whom 26,668 are men and 22,647 women. While 6,174 or 12.52% are urban inhabitants, a further 7,332 or 14.87% are pastoralists. 99.45% of the population said they were Muslim. This woreda is inhabited by Jidle, Makahil subclan of the Gadabursi, Xawaadle, Ujeejeen, Habargidir and rer aw hasan clans of the Somali people.

The 1997 national census reported a total population for this woreda of 50,085, of whom 17,525 were men and 14,530 women; 2,956 or 5.9% of its population were urban dwellers. The largest ethnic group reported in Mustahil was the Somali 50,035 (99.9%).
