= Ferfer (woreda) =

District in Somali Region, Ethiopia

Coordinates: 5°20′N 45°20′E

Ferfer (Somali: Feerfeer) is a woreda in the Somali Region of Ethiopia, named after its major town, Ferfer. Part of the Gode Zone, Ferfer is bordered on the west by Mustahil, on the north by the Korahe Zone, and on the east and south by the Provisional Administrative Line with Somalia. The Shebelle River flows through this woreda.

The average elevation in this woreda is 422 meters above sea level. As of 2008, Ferfer has 41 kilometers of asphalt road, 60 of all-weather gravel road, and 314 kilometers of community roads; about 21.2% of the total population has access to drinking water.

The October 2007 flooding by the Shebelle River displaced approximately 5,000 people in this woreda, and devastated kebeles that had not been affected in the worst flooding of 2006.

== Demographics ==
Based on the 2007 Census conducted by the Central Statistical Agency of Ethiopia (CSA), this woreda has a total population of 38,984, of whom 21,225 are men and 17,759 women. While 5,717 or 14.67% are urban inhabitants, a further 20,251 or 51.95% are pastoralists. 99.34% of the population said they were Muslim. This woreda is primarily inhabited by the Gadabursi clan of the Somali people,

The 1997 national census reported a total population for this woreda of 32,055, of whom 17,525 were men and 14,530 were women; 2,956 or 9.22% of its population were urban dwellers. The largest ethnic group reported in Ferfer was the Somali (99.99%).
