= Waldia =

Waldia may refer to:

- Valjala, Saare County, Estonia
- Weldiya, Semien Wollo Zone, Amhara Region, Ethiopia
- Weldiya (Afder), Somali Region, Ethiopia
