= Danan (woreda) =

Coordinates: 6°45′N 43°20′E

Danan (Somali: Dhanan) is one of the districts in the Somali Region of Ethiopia, named after its major town, Danan. Part of the Gode Zone, Danan is bordered on the south by Gode, on the west by Imiberi, on the north by the Fiq Zone, and on the east by the Korahe Zone.

== Demographics ==
Based on the 2007 Census conducted by the Central Statistical Agency of Ethiopia (CSA), this woreda has a total population of 23,784, of whom 13,274 are men and 10,510 women. While 6,135 or 25.8% are urban inhabitants, a further 7,728 or 32.49% are pastoralists. 99.07% of the population said they were Muslim. This woreda is primarily inhabited by the Ogaden clan of the Somali people.

The 1997 national census reported a total population for this woreda of 34,428, of whom 20,038 were males and 14,390 were females; 7,030 or 20.42% of its population were urban dwellers. The largest ethnic group reported in Werder was the Somali 34,420 (99.9%).
