= Guradamole =

Guradamole is the name of two woredas, or districts, in Ethiopia:

- Guradamole, Somali (woreda)
- Guradamole, Oromia (woreda)
