= Adadle =

District in the Somali Region of Ethiopia

Coordinates: 5°30′N 43°30′E

Adadle is one of the woredas in the Somali Region of Ethiopia. Part of the Gode Zone, Adadle is bordered on the west by the Afder Zone, on the north by the Shebelle River which separates it from Gode, on the east by Kelafo, and on the south by Somalia.

== Demographics ==
Based on the 2007 Census conducted by the Central Statistical Agency of Ethiopia (CSA), this woreda has a total population of 83,260, of whom 48,166 are men and 35,094 women. While 5,584 or 6.71% are urban inhabitants, a further 33,192 or 39.87% are pastoralists. 100% of the population said they were Muslim.
