= Battle of the Ogaden =

Battle of the Second Italo-Abyssinian War

- Part of the Second Italo-Abyssinian War
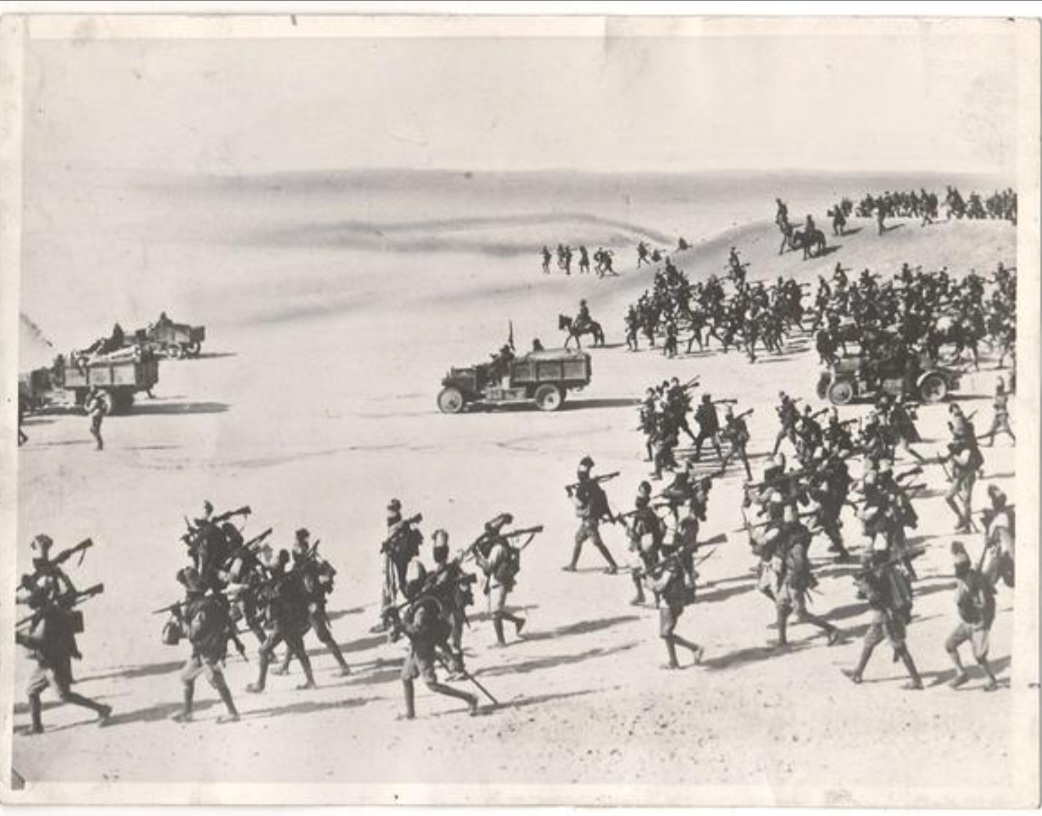
- Column of Italian colonial forces marching in Ethiopia
Date	14–25 April 1936
Location	Ogaden, Ethiopia
Result	Italian victory

Belligerents
Ethiopia	Italy

Commanders and leaders
(Ethiopian Empire) Ras Nasibu (Ethiopian Empire) Vehib Pasha	(Kingdom of Italy) Rodolfo Graziani (Kingdom of Italy) Guglielmo Nasi (Kingdom of Italy) Luigi Frusci

Strength
30,000 (Note: Barker indicates 30,000. But, according to Baer, Nasibu had approximately 28,000 men.)	38,000 (Note: Barker indicates 38,000. But, according to Baer, Graziani had approximately 30,000 men.)

Casualties and losses
5,000 casualties	2,000 casualties

The Battle of the Ogaden was fought in 1936 in the southern front of the Second Italo-Abyssinian War. The battle consisted of attacks by the Italian forces of General Rodolfo Graziani, the commander-in-chief of the forces on the "southern front", against Ethiopian defensive positions commanded by Ras Nasibu Emmanual. The strong defensive positions were designed by Wehib Pasha and known as the "Hindenburg Wall". The battle was primarily fought to the south of Harar and Jijiga.

== Background ==
On 3 October 1935, General Rodolfo Graziani advanced into Ethiopia from Italian Somaliland. His initial gains were modest. By November, after additional modest gains and a brief period of Italian inactivity, the initiative on the southern front went over to the Ethiopians.

Late in the year, Ras Desta Damtew started preparations to launch an offensive with his army of approximately 30,000 men. His goal was to advance from Negele Boran, take Dolo near the border, and to then invade Italian Somaliland. This plan was not only ill-conceived and overly ambitious, it was the subject of talk at every market place. What followed was the Battle of Genale Doria, where an Italian force under General Rodolfo Graziani completely decimated Ras Desta's army.

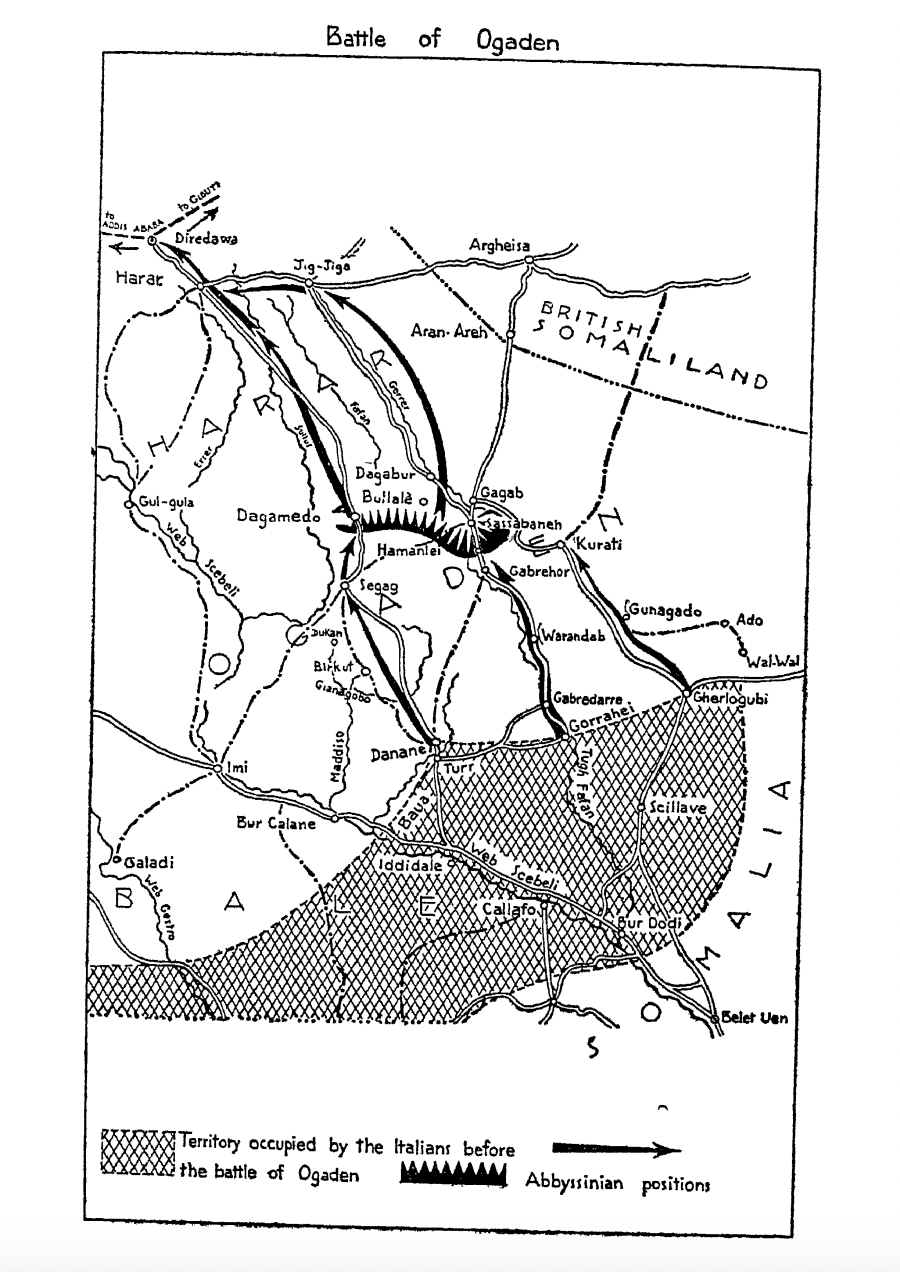
Territory occupied by the Italians before the Battle of Ogaden

After the defeat of Ras Desta's forces following the fall of Gorrahei and Gabredarre, responsibility for the southern front passed to Ras Nasibu Emmanual. The emperor had assigned him the task of closing the gap in Sidamo and strengthening the defenses in the Ogaden in order to prevent Graziani from advancing toward Addis Ababa. Once Nasibu confirmed that the Italians would not take advantage of their advance on Negele Borana, he reorganized his forces. Reinforcements arrived from several commanders: 3,000 men under Dejazmach Abebe Damtew, another 3,000 led by Dejazmach Amde Hapte Selassie, and 12,000 troops commanded by Makonnen Endelkachew. With these additional forces, Nasibu withdrew his army to the fortified positions of Harar, Jiggiga and Dagahbùr, while planning a series of offensive operations.

Encouraged by these early successes and by Graziani's apparent inactivity, Nasibu began concentrating his army near the Italian lines in early March—about two-thirds of the forces under his command. However, his Turkish military advisors, including the experienced Wehib Pasha, warned him to proceed with caution. They feared that such an offensive would dangerously stretch Ethiopian supply and communication lines. Despite these concerns, Nasibu continued his preparations. Unexpectedly, starting on March 20, the Royal Air Force (Regia Aeronautica) began a sustained bombardment of Ethiopian positions using high explosives and chemical weapons. These attacks effectively immobilized Nasibu's forces.

In April 1936, Ras Nasibu had an army of 28,000 men facing Graziani. In addition, he had the garrisons of Jijiga and Harar. Much of Ras Nasibu's army was dug in behind defensive positions that ran through Degehabur. The line was a series of entrenched positions known as the "Hindenburg Wall" in deference to the famous German defensive line of World War I, the "Hindenburg Line". The architect of the Ethiopian version was Wehib Pasha, who had been a general in the army of the Ottoman Empire, and was serving as Ras Nasibu's Chief-of-Staff for the southern front. According to a Time magazine of the period, the "Turkish General (retired)" fancied himself as "the Hero of Gallipoli" after his exploits in that campaign.

Historians disagree concerning Wehib Pasha's abilities. According to A. J. Barker, he had "made brilliant use of the ground and exploited to the fullest the military engineering techniques of the day". Anthony Mockler does not express the same opinion of Wehib Pasha's defenses. He describes them as "half-prepared trenches and gun-sites", manned by two battalions of the Imperial Bodyguard who had fled before the Italians six months before. Still, David Nicole writes: "The only real fortified positions [in Ethiopia] were those built by Ras Nasibu's forces under General Mehmet Wehib's (also known as Wehib Pasha) direction near Sassabaneh, southeast of Harar".

== Battle ==
On 14 April, Graziani ordered his entire army to advance towards the Ethiopian defensive lines in a three-pronged attack. The first column, commanded by General Guglielmo Nasi included the Libyan Division, Eritrean ascaris, various bands of dubats and the irregular bands of Olol Dinle and Hussen Ali. Nasi's column, on the Italian right, was to break through the defenses at Janogoto and Dagahamodo threaten the Ethiopian left. The second column, commanded by General Luigi Frusci, which consisted of the 6th CC.NN. Division "Tevere" (including a single unit of around a thousand volunteers from the Italian diaspora), seven colonial battalions, two light tanks companies and two groups of irregular bands was to move forward to the pivotal point of the "Hindenburg Wall". The third column, commanded by General Augusto Agostini, was on the Italian left, consisted of a mixed group of Blackshirts, Carabinieri and some bands of dubats. Agostini's column was to immediately engage the Ethiopian right flank while the 29th Infantry Division "Peloritana" was held in reserve. The first day passed uneventfully. The biggest obstacle to the Italian advance was heavy rain, swollen rivers, and thick mud. The Ethiopians were in fact waiting for the Italians in an area that they had carefully fortified over a year, skillfully exploiting its natural ruggedness with the help of Belgian military advisors and the Turk Wehib Pasha, a veteran of the Gallipoli campaign. This was only the first of a series of similar fortifications already prepared along the road to Harar.

On 15 April, Nasi's column encountered the first pockets of Ethiopian resistance. Heavy and continuous rain, combined with the determined defense mounted by the forces of Abebe Damtew and Makonnen Endelkachew, held the Italian troops in place for more than two days. The situation was eventually resolved only with the intervention of the air force, which helped break the stalemate. After repelling a final Ethiopian counterattack, Nasi launched a pursuit of the retreating Ethiopian forces at dawn on 19 April. His troops rapidly advanced: Dovale was occupied on 21 April, El Fud on 22 April, and Segàg on 23 April

Meanwhile, the other two Italian columns continued their advance without encountering significant resistance until 24 April, when fighting erupted along the entire Ogaden front. On the morning of 24 April, heavy fighting broke out at Gunu Gadu. The fiercest resistance, however, was encountered at Birgòt, where Frusci's central column faced strong Ethiopian defenses. The Italians were able to break through only the following day with the support of the air force. The Italians, having approached, then proceeded to flush out the Ethiopians by setting fire to their positions. Many of them died from the fire or were suffocated by the smoke. When additional pressure was applied, the "Hindenburg Wall" gave way and the remaining Ethiopian defenders began a withdrawal. By 25 April, all three Italian columns had succeeded in driving the Ethiopian defenders from their positions. Despite the growing fatigue among the attacking troops, Mussolini pressed Graziani to continue the advance without delay. However, heavy rains prevented operations from resuming until 29 April.

Italian success came at the cost of heavy casualties. In roughly ten days of fighting, the Italians suffered over 2,000 casualties. While the Ethiopians themselves had over 5,000 casualties, the disparity was much less than was typical. On the northern front, the usual ratio between Ethiopian and Italian casualties was ten to one.

Several acts of heroism were reported during the battle. Among the most notable were:

- Francesco Maria Barracu, awarded the Gold Medal of Military Valor.
- Ottorino Lazzarini, awarded the Gold Medal of Military Valor posthumously.
- Ezio Andolfato, awarded the Gold Medal of Military Valor posthumously.
- Renato Lordi, awarded the Gold Medal of Military Valor posthumously.
- Dante Pagnottini, awarded the Gold Medal of Military Valor posthumously.
- Guido Slataper, awarded the Gold Medal of Military Valor.
- Vittoriano Cimmarrusti, awarded the Gold Medal of Military Valor posthumously.
- Mario Ghisleni, awarded the Gold Medal of Military Valor posthumously.
- Antonio Bonsignore, awarded the Gold Medal of Military Valor posthumously.

== Aftermath ==
While the army of Ras Nasibu disintegrated, it was not destroyed. Unlike some of the other Ethiopian armies bombed or sprayed out of existence, Nasibu's army slipped out of the country or melted into the mountains to become the seeds for later resistance. But it may have been the overcast skies more than a change of heart on Graziani's part that saved the withdrawing Ethiopians from the Italian Royal Air Force. Ras Nasibu himself went into exile with the Emperor.

Graziani's only resistance on his march to Jijiga and Harar was the never ending rain. His one aim—to reach Harar before Badoglio's March of the Iron Will reached Addis Ababa—was the victim of a sea of mud that slowed all progress to a crawl.

In the end, Graziani finally reached Harar on 8 May. After Harar was captured, on 23 May three Ethiopian priests at Harar were reported to have been murdered by Somali dubats, acting under Italian officers. During the riots there they had taken refuge in the British Consulate. According to reports reaching Djibouti, on 24 May some 200 Amharic Christians had been massacred by Italian-Somalis at Harar after the capture of the town.

== See also ==
- Ethiopian Order of Battle Second Italo-Abyssinian War
- Army of the Ethiopian Empire
- List of Second Italo-Ethiopian War weapons of Ethiopia
- Italian Order of Battle Second Italo-Abyssinian War
- Royal Italian Army
- List of Italian military equipment in the Second Italo-Ethiopian War

== Notes ==
Footnotes

Citations
