= Weldiya (Afder) =

Market town in Weldiya, Amhara Region, Ethiopia

Weldiya is a market town in eastern Ethiopia The administrative center of the Afder Zone of the Somali Region, this town has a latitude and longitude of 4°20′N 42°4′E.

Based on figures from the Central Statistical Agency in 2005, Weldiya has an estimated total population of 8822, of whom 4947 are men and 3875 are women. The 1997 census reported this town had a total population of 5,909 of whom 3,268 were men and 2,641 women. The largest ethnic group reported in this town was the Somali (99.2%). It is the largest town in Dolobay woreda.
