= Kelafo (woreda) =

District in Somali Region, Ethiopia

Coordinates: 5°40′N 44°10′E

Kelafo (Somali: Qalaafe) is a woreda in the Somali Region of Ethiopia. Part of the Godey Zone, Kelafo is bordered on the south by the Somalia, on the west by Adadle, on the northwest by Gode, on the northeast by the Qoraxay Zone, and on the east by Mustahil. The Shebelle River flows through this woreda. The major town in the Kelafo district is Kelafo.

The average elevation in this woreda is 374 meters above sea level. As of 2008, Kelafo has 35 kilometers of all-weather gravel road and 300 kilometers of community roads; about 6.36% of the total population has access to drinking water.

== History ==
Fighting in Beledweyn across the border in Somalia in mid-July 1994 led to an influx of people arriving daily at Kalafo until 28 July 1994. The majority of these people were ogaden subclan members fleeing the somali subclan, who at the time controlled the town. These refugees, on their way to qallaafo, had to avoid Mustaxiil which was also controlled by the Habar Gidir, and arrived by way of a small village called Shibo. The woreda government claimed that the camp holding these refugees, located outside of Kelafo, contained 15,000 people, although the Federal government estimated it held 5,000 refugees and the United Nations Development Programme estimated the camp had contained 4,050 people by 12 August of that year.

Kelafo was one of the woredas heavily affected by the flash floods in Ethiopia during September 2006. Losses reported for this woreda include the deaths of 28 people and 5,800 livestock. The Shebelle River burst its banks again in November 2008 and affected 14 kebeles and 85 villages in Kelafo, washing away crops on 164 hectares of farmland, displacing 36,888 people and killing three.

The ability to graze livestock in Kelafo is currently under threat by the arrival of the invasive Prosopis juliflora, which is known in Somali as birsoobis literally "when the stem is cut it sprouts with shoots".

== Demographics ==
Based on the 2007 Census conducted by the Central Statistical Agency of Ethiopia (CSA), this woreda has a total population of 77,471, of whom 41,583 are men and 35,888 women. While 11,346 or 14.65% are urban inhabitants, a further 5,397 or 6.97% are pastoralists. 98.09% of the population said they were Muslim. This woreda is inhabited by the Reer Geedoow which make up the majority of the city's population.

The 1997 national census reported a total population for this woreda of 82,668, of whom 43,252 were men and 39,416 were women; 9,551 or 11.55% of its population were urban dwellers.
