= Mirab Imi =

West Imi
- Location within Ethiopia
- Coordinates: 6°27′N 42°08′E
- Country: Ethiopia
- Region: Somali
- Zone: Afder
- Elevation: 442 m (1,450 ft)

Population
  - City: 650,104
  - Urban: 7,897
- Time zone: UTC+3 (EAT)

West Imi (Somali: Iimeey Galbeed) is one of the Districts of Afder Zone in the Somali Region of Ethiopia. It is named for the historically significant village, Imi. Part of the Afder Zone, West Imi is bordered on the south by [Elekere, on the west by Raytu district Oromia Region, on the north by the Nogob Zone, and on the northeast by the Shebelle River which separates it from the Shabelle Zone. The major villages in Mirab Imi are Buulaa, Jiiq, Gabriile and Kiliwey. It is settled by Reer Abokor Sub clan of Gidir Karanle Hawiye.

The average elevation in this woreda is 459 meters above sea level. As of 2008, West Imi has no all-weather gravel road nor any community roads; about 14.2% of the total population has access to drinking water.

The Shebelle River burst its banks in November 2008, and affected 17 kebeles in West Imi, damaging crops on 3,200 hectares of farmland.

== Demographics ==
Based on the 2007 Census conducted by the Central Statistical Agency of Ethiopia (CSA), this woreda has a total population of 650,104, of whom 420,067 are men and 230,000 women. While 16.42% are urban inhabitants, a further 22.47% are pastoralists. 98.72% of the population said they were Muslim, This woreda is mainly inhabited by Reer Abokor Sub clan of Gidir Karanle Hawiye .

The 1997 national census reported a total population for this woreda of 48,675, of whom 20,627 were men and 18,048 were women; 1,197 or 3.1% of its population were urban dwellers. This total also includes an estimate for the inhabitants of 32 rural villages, which were not counted; they were estimated to have 3,436 inhabitants, of whom 1,847 were men and 1,589 women.
