= Gode (woreda) =

District in Somali Region, Ethiopia

Coordinates: 6°10′N 43°30′E

Gode (Godey) is a woreda in the Somali Region of Ethiopia, named after its major town, Gode. Part of the Gode Zone, Gode is bordered on the south by the Shebelle River which separates it from Adadle, on the northwest by Imiberi, on the north by Danan, on the northeast by the Korahe Zone, and on the southeast by Kelafo.

The average elevation in this woreda is 358 meters above sea level. As of 2008, Gode has 125 kilometers of all-weather gravel road and 630 kilometers of community roads; about 3.53% of the total population has access to drinking water.

Reports of the parts of the Somali Region affected by flash floods in 2006 use the DPPA's description of the Gode woreda. Gode was very severely affected, and losses reported for this woreda include 10 deaths 333 hectares of cropland ruined.

== Demographics ==
Based on the 2007 Census conducted by the Central Statistical Agency of Ethiopia (CSA), this woreda has a total population of 109,718, of whom 62,102 are men and 47,616 women. While 43,234 or 39.41% are urban inhabitants, a further 30,431 or 27.74% are pastoralists. 97.85% of the population said they were Muslim. This woreda is primarily inhabited by the Gadabursi clan and Ogaden clan of the Somali people,

The 1997 national census reported a total population for this woreda of 127,920, of whom 71,322 were men and 56,598 were women; 45,755 or 35.77% of its population were urban dwellers. (This total also includes an estimate for the inhabitants of 21 rural kebeles, which were not counted; they were estimated to have 31,059 inhabitants, of whom 16,772 were men and 14,287 women.) The largest ethnic group reported in Erer was the Somali (99.9%) and all the other ethnic groups made up 0.08% of the population.

== Economy ==
Although Gode is mainly arid, the crops grown in this woreda include maize, vegetables such as peppers, tomatoes, carrots, and fruits such as mango, papaw, guava, banana and lemon along the Shebelle. Further back from the river, sorghum and maize are cultivated using the seasonal river flooding or by digging small channels from the streams to the crop production areas; a limited amount of vegetables are produced in this area. Shortly after its founding, the Regional government established a farm of 752 ha in west Gode, located 60 kilometres from the town of Gode, in a different locality than the old Godey State Farm (now in Adadle). In the irrigation scheme the crops grown by the Regional Irrigation Bureau include maize and beans; vegetables such as onions, beetroot, carrot, cabbage and tomato; and fruits such as papaya, mango and guava. Gode is estimated to have a cattle population of 352,000, 244,350 sheep, 135,000 goats, and 45,000 camels and horses combined. The ecosystem of the woreda is fragile and has been subjected to intensive grazing, intensive destruction of trees for fuel wood and construction material. The area is highly denuded and exposed to soil and wind erosion. This phenomenon of environmental deterioration has been observed even during the early 1990s.
