= 6th CC.NN. Division "Tevere" =

- 6ª Divisione CC.NN. "Tevere"
- 6th CC.NN. Division "Tevere" insignia
- Active: 7 August 1935 – 15 September 1936
- Country: Kingdom of Italy
- Branch: Blackshirts
- Size: Division
- Patron: Tiber river
- Engagements: Second Italo-Ethiopian War: Battle of Ganale Doria; Battle of the Ogaden

Commanders
- Notable commanders: Enrico Boscardi

The 6th CC.NN. Division "Tevere" (Italian: 6ª Divisione CC.NN. "Tevere") was an Italian CC.NN. (Blackshirts militia) division raised on 7 August 1935 for the Second Italo-Ethiopian War against Ethiopia and disbanded after the war. The division was named for the Tiber river. The division had only limited combat value due to the age (World War I veterans), the physical disabilities (amputated veterans), and the lack of military training (Italians living abroad) of its troops, and the lack of machine guns and pack artillery. Nevertheless, it saw some combat in minor skirmishes on the Somali front, and performed creditably under the command of Generale di Divisione Enrico Boscardi.

== Organization ==
Below follows the division's organization during the Second Italo-Ethiopian War.

- 6th CC.NN. Division "Tevere"
  - 219th CC.NN. Legion "Vittorio Veneto" (World War I veterans)
    - CCXIX CC.NN. Battalion
    - CCCXIX CC.NN. Battalion
  - 220th CC.NN. Legion
    - CCI CC.NN. Battalion (World War I invalids)
    - CCXX CC.NN. Battalion (World War I Arditi)
  - 221st CC.NN. Legion (Italians living abroad)
    - CCXXI CC.NN. Battalion
    - CDXXI CC.NN. Battalion
  - 321st CC.NN. Legion (Italians living abroad)
    - CCCXXI CC.NN. Battalion
    - DXXI CC.NN. Battalion
  - VI CC.NN. Machine Gun Battalion "Curtatone e Montanara" (University students)
  - VI Artillery Group (65/17 field guns, Royal Italian Army unit)
  - VI Mixed Transport Unit (Royal Italian Army unit)
  - VI Supply Unit (Royal Italian Army unit)
  - VI CC.NN. Replacements Battalion
  - 6th Special Engineer Company (mixed CC.NN. and Royal Italian Army unit)
  - 6th Medical Section (Royal Italian Army unit)
  - 6th Logistic Section (Royal Italian Army unit)
  - 6th Carabinieri Section

The supply unit had 1,600 mules and the mixed transport unit 80 light trucks. The division engaged in war crimes in Ethiopia during the Second Italo-Ethiopian War.

== Sources ==
- Ettore Lucas and Giorgio de Vecchi, "Storia delle Unità Combattenti della MVSN 1923-1943", Giovanni Volpe Editore, 1976. pages 63 to 116 plus errata.
