= Guradamole, Somali (woreda) =

Administrative subdivision of Ethiopia

Coordinates: 6°05′N 41°05′E

Guradamole is one of the woredas in the Somali Region of Ethiopia. Part of Guradamole is bounded on the south by the Ganale Dorya River which separates it from the Liben Zone, on the west by Kersa Dula, on the north by the Oromia Region, and on the east by Goro Bekeksa. Towns in this woreda include Haro Dibe and Qundi.

== Overview ==
The altitude of this woreda ranges from 200 to 1500 meters above sea level. The other perennial river in Gurradamole is Ganale or Ganaane Dorya, Mena River, Dumal and webi'elan. Gurradamole has very green highlands. As of 2008, this woreda has no all-weather gravel road or any community roads; about 12.3% of the total population has access to drinking water.

In October 2004, a referendum was held in about 420 kebeles in 12 woredas across five zones of the Somali Region to settle the boundary between the Oromo Region and the adjacent Somali Region. According to the official results of the referendum, about 80% of the disputed areas fell under Oromo administration, though there were numerous allegations of voting irregularities in many of them. The results led over the following weeks to minorities settled in these kebeles being pressured to leave. There were reports in February 2005 that an estimated 5,450 people expelled from Bale Zone in the Oromia Region as a result of the referendum had newly relocated to Harardubo. By April the number of refugees had swollen to 10,000–15,000 living in four camps.

== Demographics ==
Based on the 2007 Census conducted by the Central Statistical Agency of Ethiopia (CSA), this woreda has a total population of 79,841, of whom 41,255 are men and 28,586 women. While 967 or 4.87% are urban inhabitants, a further 14,074 or 70.93% are pastoralists. 99.5% of the population are Muslim. This woreda is primarily inhabited by the Dir clan Gurra of the Somali people.

The 1997 national census reported a total population for this woreda of 3,090, of whom 1,375 were men and 1,715 were women; the census identified no urban inhabitants. (This total consists of an estimate for the inhabitants of all three rural kebeles in this woreda, which were not counted.)
