= Goro Bekeksa =

District in Ethiopia

Gooro Bakaksa is one of the 93 woredas in the Somali Region of Ethiopia. Part of the Liban Zone, Gurre Bakaksa is bounded on the south by the Ganale Dorya River which separates it from the Liben Zone, on the west by Guradamole, on the north by the Oromia Region, on the northeast by Elekere, and on the southeast by Cherti.

== Demographics ==
Based on the 2017 Census conducted by the Central Statistical Agency of Ethiopia (CSA), this woreda has a total population of 115,000, of whom 70,000 are men and 45,000 women. While 4,107 or 8.01% are urban inhabitants, a further 32,652 or 63.69% are pastoralists. 99.99% of the population said they were Muslim. This woreda is primarily inhabited by the (Gurre,) clan of the Somali. deserved according to the woreda cabinet and other capitals, furthermore the Gurre clan is trying to change the official name of the woreda to a name referring to their respective clan name Gurre-bakaksa.

these District consists of fifteen kebeles which are of:- 01 kebele, 02 kebele, Asha'ad, Koyo (Biyo-badan), Joog-deer (Jookey), Gifis (af-goye), harafama, Hagar-weyne, Watiti (Kabhan), Hoofi, Du'o kora, War-gudud, Hagar-mokor, Tuur, and Hargedeb.

== Gooro bakaksa Woreda Livestock Population ==
Unpublished assessment carried out by Somali regional state, bureau of livestock resource and development estimated that, the animal population of Somali region is 48,761,021 and biggest share is taken by shoats (34,368,887) followed by cattle (7,000,533) and camels (6,565,914) and 232,752 chickens among other livestock species. Of which Gurrebakaksa Woreda have the proportion of overall 797,300 livestock populations including but not limited to; Cattle (177,650), Goats (255,430), Sheep (302,385) and Camels (50,790) (LRPDB, 2017).

Despite the large number of livestock in the woreda, the sector is characterized by low productivity. The lower productivity is attributed to high disease incidence and parasite burden, low genetic potential of indigenous breeds, inadequate management, poor nutrition and reproductive performance. Among these constraints, diseases have numerous influences on productivity and fertility of herds. The effect of livestock diseases could be expressed in terms of losses due to mortality and morbidity, loss of weight, slow down growth, poor fertility performance and decrease physical power.

Recently, SRS in general and Gurrebakaksa woreda, pastoral development office in particular is planned to implement a wide range project called “Dhaqo oo Dheefso”. It aims improving livestock production and productivity through disease control and prevention, introduction of improved livestock production system.
