= Afder (woreda) =

Woreda in the Somali Region, Ethiopia

Coordinates: 5°15′N 42°30′E

Afder is one of the woredas in the Somali Region of Ethiopia. Part of the Afder Zone, Afder is bordered on the south by Dolobay, on the west by Jerti Jarreti, on the north by Elkere, on the west by the Gode Zone, and on the southeast by Barrey. Towns in Afder include Gud'usbo and Hargele.

== History ==
The population of Afder was around 1,521,100. It was the starting point of the Bale revolt. Gebru Tareke dates its initial act to June 1963, when Kahin Abdi, a bandit known for harboring Somali nationalist sentiments, openly defied the government by "becoming an outlaw of the Robin Hood type." In September, his armed band burned the small salt mine in the district, then two months later besieged Hargele for two days.

It was reported in 1994 that salt extraction would provide a revenue source for Afder; the woreda administration was charging 200 Birr on each truck leaving with salt for Negele Boran and Gode.

== Demographics ==
Based on the 2007 Census conducted by the Central Statistical Agency of Ethiopia (CSA), this woreda has a total population of 79,135, of whom 45,227 are men and 33,908 women. While 6,941 or 8.77% are urban inhabitants, a further 56,827 or 71.81% are pastoralists. 99.48% of the population said they were Muslim. This woreda is inhabited by the Dir clans such as Gaadsan clan, Guure, Guro Dhamoole and Ogaden clan of the Daarood clan in the north, and the Baadicade clan of the Hawiye in the south.

The 1997 national census reported a total population for this woreda of 65,609, of whom 38,499 were men and 27,110 were women; 6,527 or 9.95% of its population were urban dwellers. The largest ethnic group reported in Afder was the Somali people (99.89%).
