= Dolobay =

Coordinates: 4°35′N 42°10′E

Dolobay (Somali: Dolobeey) is one of the woredas in the Somali Region of Ethiopia. Part of the Afder Zone, Dolobay is bordered on the south by the Provisional Administrative Line with Somalia, on the west by the Ganale Dorya River which separates it from the Liben Zone, on the northwest by Cherti, on the north by Afder, and on the east by Bare. The major town in Dolobay is Dolobay named after the district. The major clan in the district is faqimuxumed clan which have 5 major kebele.

Other rivers in Dolobay include the Mena, and the seasonal Weyib.

== Demographics ==
According to the 2007 Census conducted by the Central Statistical Agency of Ethiopia (CSA), this woreda had a total population of 84,134, of whom 47,014 were men and 37,120 were women. Of the total population, 7,174 or 8.53% were urban inhabitants, while 39,072 people or 46.44% were pastoralists. 99.26% of the population identified as Muslim.

The woreda is predominantly inhabited by the Surre clan, specifically Fiqi Muhumed and Fiqi Omar, followed by the Garre Mare, the Gadsan of Dir, the Owlyahan of Darood, and the Beydisle of Hawiye.

== Notable people ==
1. Ugaas Sheik Ali (major clan in the woreda of baydisle clan)
2. Ugaas Ibrahim Dhaqane (Rukun)
3. Ugaas Garane - Faqi Muhamed
4. Suldan: Abdi Omar Nur Gole - Suldan of the Odomarke sub clan of Gaadsan.

== Major Towns ==
1. Koraley
2. Gubadley
3. Ceel Dhub
4. Helkuram
5. Elhar
6. Waldiya
7. Darso
8. Mad-har

According to the 1997 national census, the woreda had a total population of 71,940, with 39,891 men and 32,049 women. 5,909 or 8.21% of its population were urban dwellers. The largest ethnic groups reported in Afder Zone were the Somali clans of Hawiye, Dir and others.
