= Beyene Merid =

- Dejazmach
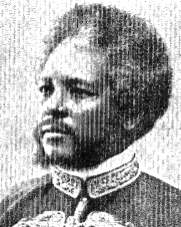
- A photo of Dejazmach Beyene Merid
- Born: 1897
- Died: 24 February 1937 (aged 39–40); Egia, Shewa
- Burial: Holy Trinity Cathedral
- Spouse: Princess Romanework
- Issue: Lij Getachew Beyene; Dejazmatch Merid Beyene; Dejazmatch Samson Beyene; Lij Gideon Beyene
- Father: Dejazmatch Merid
- Religion: Orthodox Christianity

Major-General Dejazmach Beyene Merid (sometimes rendered as Beine Merid) (1897 – 24 February 1937) was an Ethiopian army commander, a patriot, and the son-in-law of Emperor Haile Selassie I.

== Biography ==
Son of Dejazmatch Merid. Dejazmatch Beyenne Merid married Leult (Note: Roughly equivalent to Princess.) Romanework, the daughter of Haile Selassie. He spent most of his career as the Shum (Note: Roughly equivalent to Governor.) of Bale. By 1935, he had also established himself as the Shum of Gamu-Gofa.

During the Second Italo-Ethiopian War, Dejazmach (Note: Equivalent to Commander of the Gate.) Beyenne Merid commanded the Army of Bale and fought on the "southern front" against Italian forces based in Italian Somaliland. Before the Battle of Genale Doria, Beyenne Merid and the 4,000 strong Army of Bale advanced down the Shebelle River with the intention of invading central Italian Somaliland. Beyene Merid and his army was able to move forward quickly due to the smooth terrain along the Shebelle River. In November, advancing elements of Beyenne Merid's force clashed with about 1,000 dubats of the pro-Italian Olol Diinle. Both sides withdrew from the battlefield in the end, but Beyene Merid had been seriously wounded. Its commander stricken, the Army of Bale retired from battle. Olol Dinle managed to complete the main objective of his mission which was to immobilise Beine Merid.

During the Italian occupation, Beyenne Merid fought as an Arbegna. On 24 February 1937, he and his forces joined up with Ras (Note: Roughly equivalent to Duke.) Desta Damtew and his forces. On the same day, he and Desta Damtew were captured by the Italians. They were then immediately executed. (Note: Haile Selassie also writes that Beyene Merid was killed during the day-long Battle of Gogetti. In this version of events, he was shot in the head while inspecting troops.)

=== Family ===
Beyene Merid and Romane Work had four sons. In 1930, Lij (Note: Roughly equivalent to Prince.) Getachew Beyene was born. In May 1932, Dejazmatch Merid Beyene was born. In 1934, Dejazmatch Samson Beyene was born. In 1936, Lij Gideon Beyene was born. Only Merid and Samson survived the Italian occupation.

== See also ==
- Ethiopian aristocratic and court titles
- Ethiopian Order of Battle Second Italo-Abyssinian War
- Desta Damtew – Another son-in-law of Haile Selassie
- Haile Selassie Gugsa – Another son-in-law of Haile Selassie

== Notes ==
Footnotes

Citations
