= Princess Romanework =

Ethiopian princess

- Died: 14 October 1940; Turin, Kingdom of Italy
- Burial: Turin, Kingdom of Italy
- Spouse: Major-General Dejazmatch Beyene Merid
- Issue: Lij Getachew Beyene; Dejazmatch Merid Beyene; Dejazmatch Samson Beyene; Lij Gideon Beyene
- Dynasty: House of Solomon (Shewan Branch)
- Father: Haile Selassie
- Mother: Woizero Woinetu Amede / "Altayech" (possibly both of these refer to the same individual)
- Religion: Ethiopian Orthodox Tewahedo

Princess Romanework Haile Selassie, sometimes spelt as Romane Work Haile Selassie (died in Turin on 14 October 1940), was the eldest child of Emperor Haile Selassie of Ethiopia by his first wife, Woizero Altayech.

== Biography ==
The English translation of the emperor's autobiography makes no mention of Princess Romanework, or the Emperor's previous marriage, although he writes in the original Amharic version his grief at learning of the death of his eldest daughter in captivity at Turin just days after his restoration to his throne following the defeat of the Italian fascist occupation. The name of Princess Romanework's mother mentioned by Mockler- "Woizero Altayech"- may be a nickname Princess Romanework's mother used, as the contemporary source, Blata Merse Hazen Wolde Kirkos (a prominent nobleman and important figure in both the Imperial court and within the Ethiopian Orthodox Tewahedo Church), mentions Princess Romanework's mother Woizero Woinetu Amede as attending the wedding of her daughter to Dejazmatch Beyene Merid in his book about the years before the Italian occupation.

The Princess married Major-General Dejazmach Beyene Merid, governor of Bale, and they had four sons, two of whom Dejazmach Merid Beyene and Dejazmach Samson Beyene, survived to adulthood.

Princess Romanework was captured by the Italians and interned with many other noble Ethiopians on the prison island of Asinara, off the coast of Sardinia as one of the Ethiopian POWs during the Second Italo-Ethiopian War. However, her husband Beyene Merid remained at liberty and was a leader of the resistance against the Italian occupation of Ethiopia from 1936 until he too was captured, to be executed in 1937. Falling ill, Romanework was moved to the Ospedale Maggiore in Turin, where she died on 14 October 1940, probably of tuberculosis.

After the end of the Second World War, the Italians were asked to return Princess Romanework's body, and those of her two younger sons to Ethiopia, where they would be interred in the Imperial family's crypt in the Holy Trinity Cathedral at Addis Ababa. However this was never actually carried out and the Princess remains buried in the Monumental Cemetery of Turin with her son Lij Getachew. Her surviving sons were raised by her father the Emperor Haile Selassie, and her line was represented by her grandson Lij Sebastianos Beyene (1960–2021), who lived in Abingdon, England.

== Patronages ==
- President of the Ethiopian Women's Charitable Works Association.

== Honours ==
- - Dame Grand Cordon of the Order of the Queen of Sheba (1930).
- Imperial Coronation Medal (1930).

== Ancestry ==
Ancestors of Princess Romanework

16. Dejazmach Wolde Malakot Yamana Krestos
8. Dejazmach Wolde Mikael Gudessa
17. Woizero Kalama Worq
4. Ras Mäkonnen Wäldä-Mika'él Guddisa
18. Negus (King) Sahle Selassie
9. Immabet Tenagnework Sahle Selassie
19. Woizero Yimegnushal Ayele
2. Emperor Haile Selassie I
10. Dejazmach Ali Abba Jifar of Woreilu
5. Woizero Yeshimebet Ali Abba Jifar
22. Ato Yimeru of Gurage
11. Immabet-Hoy Walatta Ihata Giyorgis Yimeru
23. Woizero Araza-Aregai
1. Princess Romanework of Ethiopia
3. Woizero Woinetu Amede
