= Beercaano =

District in Ethiopia

Ber'ano is a district located in Shabelle Zone, which crosses Shebelle River in Ethiopia. It is home to a large number of agricultural resources and farmers.
