= Kersa Dula =

Kersa Dula is one of the woredas in the Somali Region of Ethiopia. Part of the liibaan zone Kersa Dula is bounded on the south, west and north by the Oromia Region, and on the east by welmal river

== Demographics ==
Based on the 2007 Census conducted by the Central Statistical Agency of Ethiopia (CSA), this woreda is primary inhabited by the Gurra clan of the Somali people and it has a total population of 42,774, of whom 23,541 are men and 19,233 women. While 3,631 or 8.49% are urban inhabitants, a further 33,114 or 77.42% are pastoralists. 99.36% of the population said they were Muslim.
