= Hargelle (woreda) =

District of Ethiopia

- District
- Country: Ethiopia

Hargelle serves as the administrative capital of the Ader Zone. population 173,000

Geographically, it is located in the arid lowlands of southeastern Ethiopia, characterized by a hot semi-arid climate. The surrounding landscape consists mainly of flat rangeland, which shapes both the lifestyle and the economy of its inhabitants, largely centered on pastoralism and livestock rearing.

Hargele is located at approximately latitude 5°40′ North and longitude 42°12′ East, within the Somali Region of Ethiopia. It lies about 850 km from Jigjiga, the capital city of the Somali Region.

Hargelle Woreda is surrounded by several neighboring districts that shape its social and economic interactions. To the north, it meets Elkere Woreda, while to the west it shares boundaries with Cheratti Woreda. Moving southward, Hargelle is bordered by Dolobay Woreda, and toward the southeast it connects with Bare Woreda. Finally, on its northeastern side, Hargelle is bordered by Kohle Woreda. These neighboring districts form a network of communities that interact through trade, migration, and cultural exchange. district of Somali Region in Ethiopia.

Hargelle is one of the woredas in the Somali Region of Ethiopia.

- hargele
