= Feerfeer =

Feerfeer Feerfeer
- Town
- Location in Somalia
- Coordinates: 05°05′N 45°05′E
- Country: Somalia: Hirshabelle
- Region: Hiiraan
- District: Feerfeer

Area
  - Total: 30 km^{2} (12 sq mi)

Population
  - Total: 200,450
- Time zone: UTC+3 (EAT)

Feerfeer District (Somali: Degmada Feerfeer) is a district in the eastern Hiiraan region of Hirshabelle State, Somalia. The town is located 40 km northeast of Beledweyne And is inhabited by Hawadle.
