= Ghebremariam =

Common surname in Eritrea and Ethiopia

Ghebremariam (Ge'ez: ገብረማርያም, Tigrinya: ገብረማርያም, gebremarīyam) or Gebremariam (Amharic: ገብረማሪያም, gebiremarīyami) is a common surname in Eritrea and Ethiopia with the meaning: Gebre means servant and work; Mariam means Mary "(Gebre + Mariam) means servant and work of Mary". It can refer to the following people:

== Ghebremariam ==
- Woldemichael Ghebremariam, Eritrean politician

== Gebremariam ==
- Alana Gebremariam (born 1997), Belarusian pro-democracy activist and feminist
- Gebregziabher Gebremariam (born 1984), retired Ethiopian long-distance runner
- Haile Tilahun Gebremariam (born 1954), Ethiopian officer
