= Nasibu Zeamanuel =

Ethiopian general (1893–1936)

Nasibu Zeamanuel, also Nasibu Zamanuael or Nasibu Emmanual in some texts (Amharic: ነሲቡ ዘአማኑኤል; 1893 – 16 October 1936), was an army commander of the Ethiopian Empire. Along with his brother Wasane, historian Bahru Zewde groups Nasibu "among the most colourful of the first-generation intellectuals" of Twentieth-century Ethiopia. His maternal grandfather, Azaz Emmanual Wolde Malakot, whose name both brothers came to adopt, was a notable courtier of Emperor.

== Biography ==
Nasibu Zeamanuel was educated at the Menelik II School (Ecole Imperiale Menelik II) in Addis Ababa with his brother Wasane, where they received a Western-style education. Nasibu's early career "closely replicated his brother's", as Bahru Zewde points out. Like Wasane he was successively Consul in Asmara then mayor of Addis Ababa, but unlike Wasane his tenure as mayor was much longer (1922-1932). Bahru agrees with Eshetu Assen that Nasibu was a reforming mayor, pointing out his reforms included "the registration and categorization of urban land, the institution of traffic police and sanitation guards, a ban on the custom of firing shots during festivities, the proscription of the capricious system of leba shay, the burying of the bodies of dead animals, road-building, granting loans to people building houses along the main roads so that the construction would add to the beauty of the city, the institution of night guards to curb mugging and the municipal certification of contracts." After visiting Berlin in 1929, Nasibu made investigations into introducing a modern water supply system to Addis Ababa.

Being in command of the municipal police, which he organized along modern lines, Nasibu played a key role in the political power struggle of 1928, supporting Ras (Note: Roughly equivalent to Duke.) Tafari (the later Emperor Haile Selassie) against first Dejazmach (Note: Roughly equivalent to Commander or General of the Gate.) Balcha Safo then against Dejazmach Abba Weqaw. In 1930, Nasibu Emmanual was appointed as the Director of the Ministry of War by Emperor Haile Selassie. He was considered by many to be un-Ethiopian because he was mission educated. He was also considered un-Ethiopian because he spoke Italian and French and because he dressed in modern European clothing and uniforms. In 1931, Nasibu Emmanual was named Dejazmach and Shum (Note: Roughly equivalent to Governor.) of Gurage Province and Soddo Province. In 1932, he became Shum of Bale Province.

Ras Nasibu fought on the "southern front" during the Second Italo-Ethiopian War. He became the Commander-in-Chief of the Ethiopian forces on this front upon the death of Grazmach (Note: Roughly equivalent to Commander of the Left Wing.) Afawarq Walda Samayat. Nasibu's headquarters was initially at Degehabur, but later he moved to Jijiga. Nasibu specifically commanded the Ethiopian forces fighting against the forces of Italian General Rodolfo Graziani during the Battle of the Ogaden. When Graziani started the large scale use of mustard gas on Nasibu's men, Nasibu responded:

"The League of Nations! We fight and die while the League talks. ... If only we could fight men in the manner of men! But we are facing an invader who uses the most fiendish methods known to warfare all because he is angered that we protect our homes and land. Our lands are being laid barren by gas; our mules, sheep, and cattle are dying in the fields."

In May 1936, Nasibu accompanied the Emperor and the Royal Court into exile. He briefly served as the leader of the Ethiopian delegation to the League of Nations in Geneva, Switzerland. He delivered two draft resolutions to the General Secretary. But, due to illness, he soon left the Royal Party. On 16 October, Nasibu Emmanual died of tuberculosis in Davos, Switzerland.

== See also ==
- Ethiopian aristocratic and court titles
- List of field marshals
- Desta Damtew
- Wehib Pasha

== Notes ==
Footnotes

Citations
