= Imi, Ethiopia =

Imi
- Location within Ethiopia
- Coordinates: 6°28′N 42°10′E
- Country: Ethiopia
- Region: Somali
- Zone: Afder
- Woreda: Mirab Imi
- Elevation: 442 m (1,450 ft)
- Time zone: UTC+3 (EAT)

Imi (also transliterated as Imay and Hinna, Arabic: إيماني) is a town in the Somali Region of Ethiopia. It is currently divided to two separate towns. East Imi located in Imiberi woreda of the Gode Zone and West Imi located in Mirab Imi woreda of the Afder Zone. The Shebelle River runs between these towns. It's located at latitude and longitude 6°28′N 42°10′E with an elevation of 442 meters above sea level.

The clans that live here are the Hawiye (Karanle) and Ogaden clan (Aulihan) (Abdalle) of the Somali people.

The Central Statistical Agency has not published an estimate for this village's 2005 population. Imi hosts an airport (ICAO code HAIM) which consists of an unpaved airstrip about 1050 meters in length, possibly the shortest in an Ethiopian civil airport.

== History ==
Probably the earliest European explorer to visit Imi was Arthur Rimbaud, who was working at the time as a commercial agent in Harar for the firm of Mazeran, Vinnay and Barday. In a report of his expeditions into the "Ogadine" (or Ogaden), dated 10 December 1883, Rimbaud proposed setting up a trading post at Imi, "a large, permanent village situated on the Ogadine bank of the river, eight days from Harar by caravan."

Near Imi, Ras Makonnen Wolde Mikael's troops had suffered a grievous defeat by the Rer Amaden warriors in 1890, under the command of a tough Rer Amaden Chief Kariye Ali Farah. A British hunter Colonel Swayne, who visited Imi in February 1893, was shown "the remains of the bivouac of an enormous Abyssinian army which had been defeated some two or three years before." Italian explorers who visited Imi early in 1891 found the once prosperous village "squalid" and miserable because of raids from Harar. A local landmark in Imi is the tomb of Mohammed Abdullah Hassan, known as "Mad Mullah"; he died in 1921, but by the 1930s his tomb had become a shapeless heap of rubble.

In 1964 the Bale rebels attacked larger settlements, such as Kere and Imi and, while they failed to capture them, they succeeded in gaining control of the rest of the district as smaller posts were abandoned by government forces. Of these two, Imi was the only one which the rebels at one point captured and held briefly. Twelve years later, 17 policemen were reported killed from an attack on Imi in October 1976. During the Ogaden War, well-armed guerillas besieged Imi and other local towns.
