= Afawarq Walda Samayat =

Ethiopian administrator and commander

- Died: 5 November 1935
- Military career
- Allegiance: Ethiopia
- Conflicts: Second Italo-Ethiopian War
- Other work: Administrator

Afawarq Walda Samayat, or Afework Woldesemait (died 5 November 1935), was an Ethiopian administrator and commander.

== Biography ==
Afawarq belonged to the recently conquered Kafa tribe of southern Ethiopia, who were traditionally seen as a "slave race" by the northern elite. He initially served in the household of Empress Zewditu before becoming a military governor of the Ogaden region. In 1935, at the outbreak of the Second Italo-Ethiopian War, grazmach (Note: Roughly equivalent to commander of the left wing.) and balambaras (Note: Roughly equivalent to commander of the fortress.) Afawarq Walda Samayat was the acting shum (Note: Roughly equivalent to governor.) of Jijiga. He worked tirelessly to prepare the Ogaden for war on what was known as the "southern front".

The British-South African journalist George Steer described Afawarq after meeting him in late 1935; "He was wearing now the simple field dress of an Abyssinian officer, which suited him better than the costume of the court. That is to say, he was wearing a Japanese solar topee, a British warm, Ethiopian jodhpurs and Somali sandals. A heavy revolver hung at his side. His manner was slow, steady and somewhat defiant. He showed at once that he was a man of weight and force. His Kafa ancestry made him much more African outwardly than the other chiefs that I had seen — the heavy way he sat under the canopy, the dark short eyelashes that curved back from his eyes, which rolled a little when he said anything positive".

After the outbreak of the war, the Italians under Rodolfo Graziani led a column of six battalions of dubats, four field batteries, nine tanks and twenty armoured cars towards the fort of Gorahai. Gorahai was known as an old stronghold of Sayyid Mohammed Abdullah Hassan (called the "Mad Mullah" by the British). With approximately three thousand fighters under his command, Afawarq Walda Samayat (Note: Afawarq Walda Samayat is simply identified as Afewerk by A. J. Barker and as Azaye Afework by Time magazine.) had turned Gorahai into an armed camp. Bombers of the Italian Royal Air Force (Regia Aeronautica) regularly attacked Gorahai and Afawarq himself directed the fire of the lone anti-aircraft gun, a 37 mm Oerlikon. The gun was mounted in one of the old-style turrets of the Mad Mullah's antiquated fort. Afawarq's men quickly learned how to cope with air attacks by diving into deep trenches. In addition, they had sufficient modern arms to thwart assaults on the ground and to inflict heavy losses.

During one of the regular bombings by the Italians, Afawarq was seriously wounded. He refused to be taken to the hospital because he feared that the morale of his men would suffer in his absence. Within 48-hours the wound became gangrenous and, on 5 November 1935, Afawarq collapsed and died. On 7 November, his fear about the morale of his men proved to be correct and they abandoned Gorahei. He was posthumously promoted to dejazmach (Note: Roughly equivalent to commander of the gate.) by Emperor Haile Selassie.

== See also ==
- Ethiopian aristocratic and court titles
- Ethiopian Order of Battle Second Italo-Abyssinian War
- Nasibu Emmanual

== Notes ==
Footnotes

Citations
