= Melka Chireti, Ethiopia =

Jarati (Melka Chireti) is a district (woreda) in the Afder Zone of the Somali Region. The town of Jarati has an estimated population of 149,903 people (84,841 men and 65,062 women). The majority of the inhabitants are from the Gaadsan clan, particularly the Reer Dhaweed Aadan lineage.

== Overview ==
The NGO Médecins Sans Frontières operates a clinic in Melka Chireti.

== Demographics ==
This woreda is primarily inhabited by Gaadsan clan of Somali.Karanle

Based on figures from the Central Statistical Agency in 2005, Melka Chireti has an estimated total population of 8,903, of whom 4,841 were men and 4,062 were women. The 1997 national census reported a total population for this town of 5,967, of whom 3,198 were men and 2,769 were women. The predominant ethnic group reported in Jarati was the Dawed clan of Somali(99.64% of the population). It is the largest town in Chereti woreda.

Major towns in Chereti include Ara-arba, Gurro, Habal-alan, Ducanle, and Janale.
