= Global Communities =

US-based nonprofit organization

Global Communities is a global impact organization with a mission to bring together local and global insights to save lives, expand opportunity, and fuel brighter futures.

The non-profit organization was founded in 1952 as the Cooperative Housing Foundation and provided affordable housing for low-income families in rural and urban America. In April 2020, Global Communities and PCI announced a merger to form one organization based on shared missions and complementary areas of technical expertise and geographic reach. In 2012, the organization changed its name to Global Communities.

== History ==
Originally, Global Communities was established as the Foundation for Cooperative Housing (FCH) in 1952, as a 501(c)(3) non-profit corporation seeking to help low- and moderate- income families in America and low-income urban neighborhoods to achieve improved economic standing and quality of life through the construction of affordable housing. Following their inception, they sponsored over 60,000 units of cooperative housing in 35 states across the US. In the 1960s the organization began operations outside of the U.S. developing cooperative housing in Central America. In the 1970s this trend of working outside of the U.S. to develop housing continued and in the 1980s Global Communities' programming was entirely international. Through the rest of the 1980s and the 1990s the organization founded more programs and began addressing additional community needs. Global Communities has been working in Romania since 1994 to enhance the competitiveness of the business community, and prepare the country for EU accession – an effort that culminated in 2007. During the 2000s, the organization expanded its operations significantly responding to major disasters such as the 2004 Indian Ocean Tsunami and the 2010 Haiti earthquake; operating the largest international network of microfinance institutions in the Middle East, with major operations in Iraq, Lebanon, West Bank and Gaza and Jordan; and becoming recognized as a major U.S.-based international development NGO.

PCI was founded in San Diego in 1961 with the goal of helping the world's most impoverished communities gain access to better health. In 1962, a program was established in Hong Kong's Walled City through a floating clinic in the harbor set up to offer medical services. Two years later, Project Concern opened a hospital in South Vietnam to provide care and services, a program that lasted throughout the Vietnam War. The organization went on to establish a presence in Tijuana, Mexico, and the Appalachian region of Tennessee. In 1969, PCI's first Walk for Mankind was held in Santa Rosa, California. In the next 30 years, PCI launched programs in Bali, Indonesia, Ethiopia, Guatemala, Bolivia, Belize, Somalia, The Gambia, Papua New Guinea, Romania, Nicaragua, Zambia and India. During the 2000s, PCI established Casa Materna in the rural, western highlands of Guatemala to reduce maternal and infant mortality. Over the next two decade, they expanded their global presence to include Honduras, Ghana, Botswana, Malawi, Tanzania and South Africa. PCI responded to major disasters such as the devastating 2004 Indian Ocean Tsunami and the 2010 Haiti earthquake.
