= Mustahīl (town) =

Mustahīl Mustaxiil (Somali)
- Location in Ethiopia
- Coordinates: 5°15′N 44°44′E
- Country: Ethiopia
- Region: Somali Region
- Time zone: UTC+3 (EAT)

Mustahīl (Amharic: ሙስታሂል, Somali: Mustaxiil) is a town in eastern Ethiopia, close to the border with Somalia. Located in the Gode Zone in the Somali Region and straddling the Shabelle River, it has a latitude and longitude of 5°15′N 44°44′E with an altitude of 193 meters above sea level. It is the main town of the Mustahīl woreda. This district belongs to Jidle tribe

== History ==
In the early 1930s the Italians with their banda troops encroached some distance inside Ethiopian territory into the Ogaden. Colonel Rettli had his headquarters at Mustahil, where he made contact with Sultan Olol Diinle and convinced him to support the Italian cause.

Mustahil has been subjected to a number of floods of the Shabelle. In October 1961, the river rose three meters. The Ethiopian Red Cross was among organizations providing aid in that crisis. Seven years later Mustahil suffered serious flooding again (May 1968). A third occasion was in April–May 2003, when the Shabelle once again burst its banks, forcing some 96,000 people to flee their homes. Kelafo and Mustahil were amongst the hardest hit. A UNICEF representative said that the situation was "worse than any year before."

The BBC reported 9 March 2009 that the Ogaden National Liberation Front (ONLF) claimed it had captured Mustahil, having killed 80 Ethiopian soldiers, and was also fighting for control of Werder and Kelafo. The Ethiopian government denied this, claiming that the ONLF was on the run. On 12 May of that year, a clash was reported between ONLF fighters and the Ethiopian army at a checkpoint outside Mustahil. Two nomadic people at the scene were said to have been killed, while the ONLF claimed they killed 20 Ethiopian soldiers and destroyed two military vehicles.

== Demographics ==
Based on figures from the Central Statistical Agency in 2005, Mustahil has an estimated total population of 7,774, of whom 4,347 are men and 3,427 are women.

The 1997 census reported this town had a total population of 5,207 of whom 1,597 were men and 1,359 women. The largest ethnic group in Mustahil was the Somali people (99.5%). sources state this town is owned by the jidle, and sub-clan of the gugundhabe Somalis.
