= Ferfer =

Ferfer ፌርፈር
- Location within Ethiopia Location within the Horn of Africa Location within Africa
- Coordinates: 05°05′N 45°05′E
- Country: Ethiopia
- Region: Somali Region
- District (woreda): Ferfer
- Elevation: 177 m (581 ft)

Population (2005)
  - Total: 133,521 (est)
- Time zone: UTC+3 (EAT)

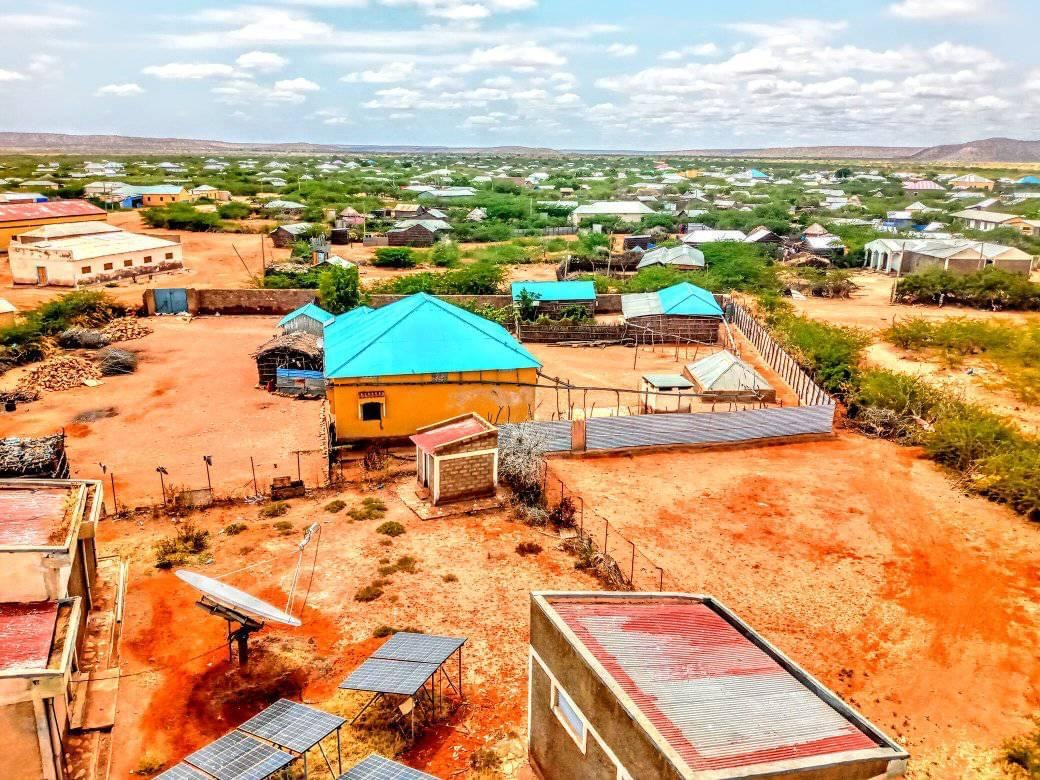

Ferfer is a town in the Ethiopian Somali Regional State, on the border with the Somali Hiran region (Beledweyne District). The town straddles the disputed 1950s-era Provisional Administrative Line (as depicted on virtually all worldwide maps, atlases, and geographic websites) that separates the Ogaden region of Ethiopia from Somalia, and has a latitude and longitude of 05°05′N 45°08′E with an elevation of 230 meters above sea level.

During the first three months of 1964, heavy fighting took place between Ethiopia and Somalia at several border points in the Ogaden, one of which was Ferfer. Ferfer was among the locations within Ethiopia that were still under Somali control after Somalia's defeat in the Ogaden War of 1977/78.

The Ethiopian army maintains an important base in Ferfer. In June 2008, the border town was briefly seized by the Somali al-Shabaab.

== Demographics ==
Based on figures from the Central Statistical Agency in 2005, Ferfer has an estimated total population of 4,411 of whom 2,418 are men and 1,993 are women. The 1997 census reported this town had a total population of 2,956, 1,597 being men and 1,359 women. All of the inhabitants of this town were Somalis. It is the largest settlement in the Ferfer woreda.
