= Kelafo =

Kelafo town ቀላፎ
- Town
- Location within Ethiopia
- Coordinates: 5°35′20″N 44°12′20″E
- Country: Ethiopia
- Region: Somali
- Zone: Kelafo
- Elevation: 233 m (764 ft)

Population (2005)
  - Total: 14,242
- Time zone: UTC+3 (EAT)

Kelafo (Somali: Qalaafe; Somali pronunciation: [qalaːfe], Amharic: ቀላፎ, romanized: Qällafo) is a town in eastern Ethiopia. Located in the Kelafo Zone of the Somali Region, this town has a latitude and longitude of 05°35′20″N 44°12′20″E and an elevation of 233 meters above sea level.

The regional successor to the Muslim states of Ifat and Adal, the Ajuran Sultanate, governed its territories from Qalafo along the upper Shabelle River in eastern Ogaden until its decline in the 17th century.

The UN-OCHA-Ethiopia website provides details of the health clinic in Kelafo, which was built in 1991 with funds and equipment provided by the Australian government. Kelafo is served by an airport (ICAO code HAKL), and a bridge across the Shebelle River which was scoured in the May 1995 floods.

== Demographics ==
Based on figures from the Central Statistical Agency in 2005, this town has an estimated total population of 14,242, of whom 7,522 are men and 6,720 are women. The 1997 census reported this town had a total population of 9,551 of whom 4,970 were men and 4,581 women. The largest two ethnic groups reported in this town were the Somali (96.85%), and the Amhara (1%); all other ethnic groups made up 2.15% of the population. It is the largest town in Kelafo woreda.
