= Afder Zone =

Afder Zone Gobolka Afdheer Hargeelle
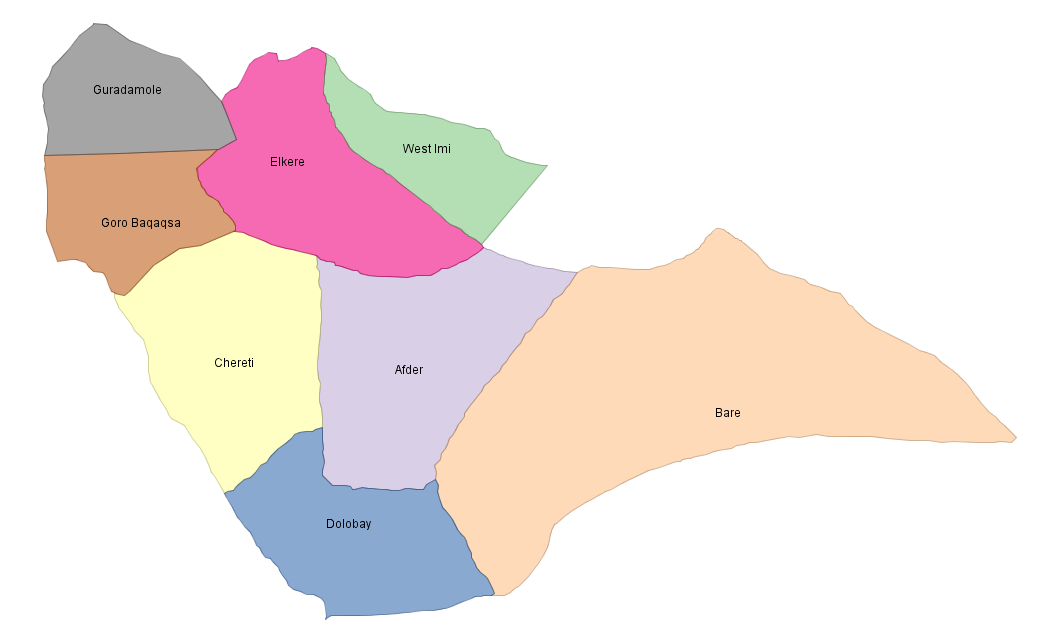
- Map of Afder Zone

- Location within Ethiopia
- Coordinates: 5°15′N 43°00′E
- Country: Ethiopia
- Region: Somali
- Zone: Afder
- Capital: Hargele

Population (2007)
  - Total: 1,936,290
- Time zone: UTC+3 (EAT)

Afder (Somali: Afdheer) is one of the eleven Zones of the Somali Region of Ethiopia. Afder is bordered on the southwest by the Ganale Dorya River which separates it from the Liben Zone, on the west by the Oromia Region, on the north by Nogob Zone, on the northeast by Shabele Zone, and on south by the Somalia federal states of Hirshabelle, South West and Jubaland. The administrative center of Afder is Hargele; other towns in Afder include West Imey, and Cherti

== Demographics ==
Based on the 2007 census conducted by the Central Statistical Agency of Ethiopia (CSA), the zone had a total population of 570,629, of whom 325,764 were men and 244,865 women. While 45,763 or 8.02% were urban inhabitants, a further 316,032 or 55.38% were pastoralists. The Somali language was spoken as a first language by 88.21%; the remaining 11.79% spoke all other primary languages reported. 100% of the population said they were Muslim.

The 1997 national census reported a total population for the zone of 358,998 in 53,075 households, of whom 200,948 were men and 158,050 were women; 25,747 or 7.17% of its population were urban dwellers. (This total also includes an estimate for the inhabitants of nine rural kebeles, which were not counted; they were estimated to have 6,526 inhabitants, of whom 3,222 were men and 3,304 women.) The two largest ethnic groups reported in Afder were the Somali who made up 96.3% of the population and the Oromo (1.29%); all other ethnic groups made up 2.5% of the population. Somali was spoken as a first language by 93.23% of the inhabitants, and Garire by 2.16%; the remaining 4.61% spoke all other primary languages reported. Concerning education in the zone, 3.43% of the population were considered literate; 0.57% of children aged 7–12 were in primary school, while a negligible number of the children aged 13–14 were in junior secondary school, and none of children aged 15–18 were in senior secondary school. About 24.2% of the urban houses and 6.7% of all houses had access to safe drinking water at the time of the census; about 23% of the urban and 4.3% of the total had toilet facilities.

== Development ==
According to a May 24, 2004, World Bank memorandum, none of the inhabitants of Afder had access to electricity, the zone has a road density of 8.3 kilometers per 1,000 square kilometers, the average rural household had 0.6 hectare of land (compared to the national average of 1.01 hectare of land and an average of 2.25 for pastoral regions) and the equivalent of 3.1 head of livestock. 28.2% of the population was in non-farm related jobs, compared to the national average of 25% and an average of 28% for pastoral regions. Only 12% of eligible children are enrolled in primary school and none in secondary schools. 100% of the zone was exposed to malaria and none to Tsetse fly. The memorandum gave this zone a drought risk rating of 660.

In April 2006, in partnership with Al-Nejah Relief, CHF International began a program to restore shallow wells and improve sanitation habits in the Afder and Gode zones of the Somali region.

== Agriculture ==
Map of the regions and zones of Ethiopia

On 5–23 November 2003, the CSA conducted the first ever national agricultural census, of which the livestock census was an important component. For the Somali region, the CSA generated estimated figures for the livestock population (cattle, sheep, goats, camels and equids) and their distribution by commissioning an aerial survey. For the Afder zone, its results included:

Animal	Estimated total	number per km^{2}.
cattle	166,471	2.8
sheep	1,152,509	31.3 (including goats)
goats	722,709	31.3 (including sheep)
camels	140,454	2.3
asses	4,327	0.1 (all equids)
mules	63	0.1 (all equids)
horses	16	0.1 (all equids)
