= Shabelle Zone =

Shabelle Zone Gobalka Shabelle
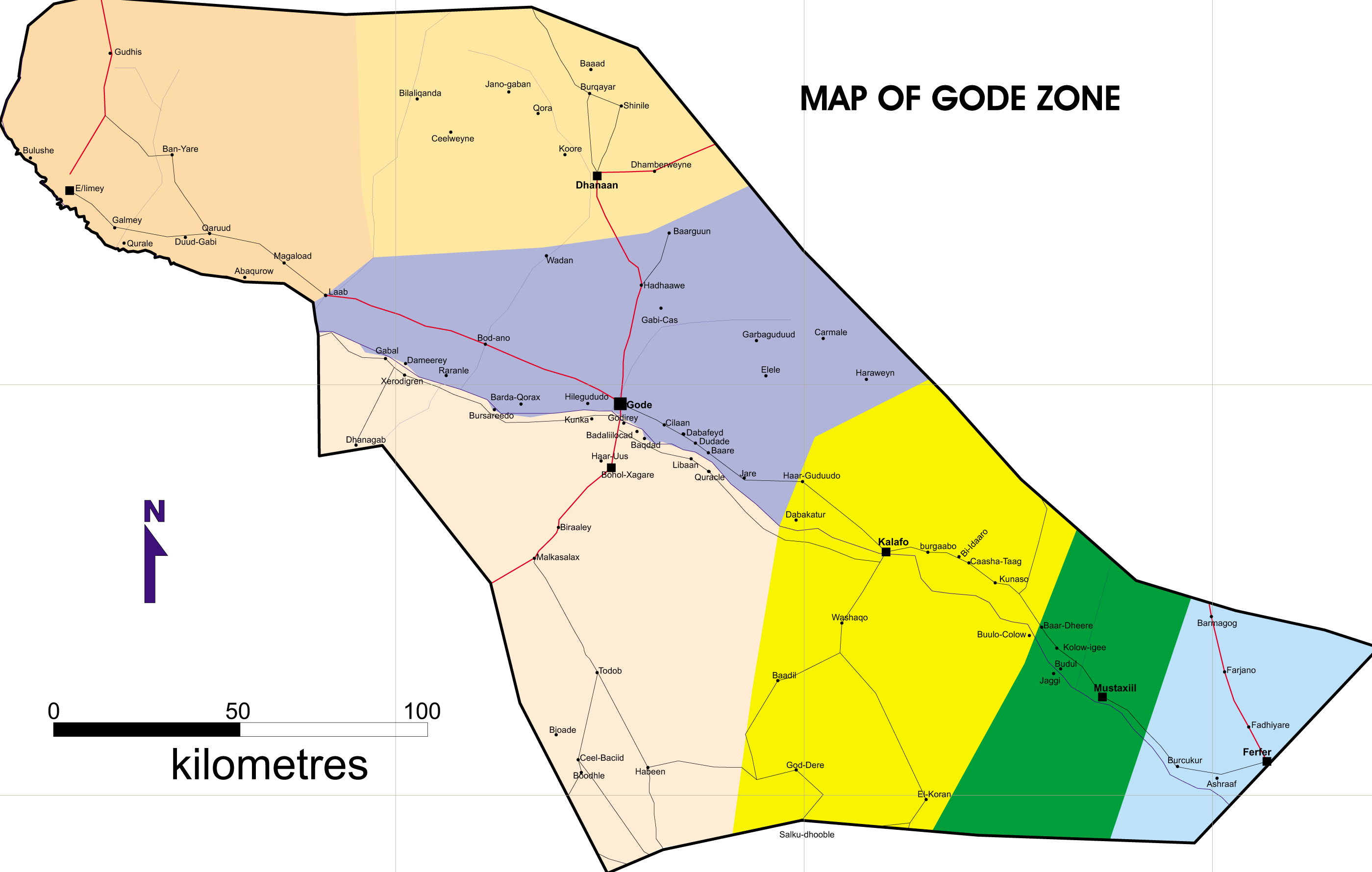
- Map of Shabelle Zone

- Location within Ethiopia
- Coordinates: 6°00′N 43°45′E
- Country: Ethiopia
- Region: Somali
- Zone: Shabelle
- Capital: Gode

Population (2007)
  - Total: 464,253
- Time zone: UTC+3 (EAT)

Shabelle is one of nine Zones of the Somali Region of Ethiopia. It was previously known as Gode (Somali: Godey, Arabic: غودي), so named after its largest city, Gode. Shabelle is bordered on the west by Afder, on the north by Fiq, on the northeast by Korahe. On the south it borders the Provisional Administrative Line of Somalia along the borders of the Hirshabelle and Galmudug federal states.

== Overview ==
Grazing land for pastoralists make up the majority of Shabelle Zone. Six of its seven woredas are located along the banks of the Shebelle river, which flows out of the highlands through the Zone and into Somalia. 40-50% of the population depend on irrigated farming, 25-30% on agro-pastoralism and 20-30% on pastoralism and less than 1% on urban service activities. Shabelle is characterised by an "extensive flat to gently sloping topography" that accounts for about 94% of the Zone’s total area. An estimated 56% of the area of the zone is occupied by pasturage which consists of open grass land, bush and shrub grass land, and wooded grass land, while 33% is occupied by wood land, shrub land and bush land. The remaining 11% is considered arable or cultivated.

== Region ==
The famous Shebelle River runs through this zone. Shabelle Zone has ten woredas which consists of: Gode, Kelafo, Mustahīl, Ferfer, Adadle, Imi, Danan, Beercaano, Elele and Abaaqarow.

Al-Nejah Relief, CHF International began a program to restore and dig shallow wells and improve sanitation habits in the Gode and Afder Zones of the Somali Region.

== Demographics ==
Based on the 2007 Census conducted by the Central Statistical Agency of Ethiopia (CSA), this Zone has a total population of 464,253, of whom 258,558 are men and 205,695 women. While 89,593 or 19.3% are urban inhabitants, a further 118,608 or 25.55% were pastoralists. The largest ethnic group reported in Gode was the Somalis (98.62%); all other ethnic groups made up 1.38% of the population. Somali language is spoken as a first language by 98.98%; the remaining 1.02% spoke all other primary languages reported. 98.76% of the population said they were Muslim.

The 1997 national census reported a total population for this Zone of 327,156 in 43,337 households, of whom 179,352 were men and 147,804 were women; 70,499 or 21.55% of its population were urban dwellers. (This total also includes an estimate for the inhabitants of 21 rural kebeles, which were not counted; they were estimated to have 31,059 inhabitants, of whom 16,772 were men and 14,287 women.) The largest ethnic group reported in Gode was the Somali (99.55%); a similar proportion spoke Somali (99.16%) as their primary language. Only 19,702 or 6.65% were literate.

According to a May 24, 2004 World Bank memorandum, 2% of the inhabitants of Gode have access to electricity, this zone has a road density of 18.3 kilometers per 1000 square kilometers, the average rural household has 0.8 hectare of land (compared to the national average of 1.01 hectare of land and an average of 2.25 for pastoral Regions) and the equivalent of 2.9 heads of livestock. 28.2% of the population is in non-farm related jobs, compared to the national average of 25% and an average of 28% for pastoral Regions. 42% of all eligible children are enrolled in primary school, and 3% in secondary schools. 100% of the zone is exposed to malaria, and none to Tsetse fly. The memorandum gave this zone a drought risk rating of 726.

== Agriculture ==
Map of the regions and zones of Ethiopia

On 5–23 November 2003, the CSA conducted the first ever national agricultural census, of which the livestock census was an important component. For the Somali Region, the CSA generated estimated figures for the livestock population (cattle, sheep, goats, camels, and equids) and their distribution by commissioning an aerial survey. For the Gode Zone, their results included:

Animal	Estimated total	number per sqk.
cattle	165,277	4.7
sheep	517,668	42.4 (including goats)
goats	985,869	42.4 (including sheep)
camels	115,498	3.3
asses	10,758	0.3 (all equids)
mules	58	0.3 (all equids)
horses	0	
