= Army of the Ethiopian Empire =

Military force of Ethiopia used during Ethiopian Empire

- Coat of arms of the Ethiopian Empire
- Disbanded: 1974

Leadership
- Commander-in-Chief: Emperor of Ethiopia
- Minister of Defense: Abiye Abebe (last)
- Chief of the General Staff: Aman Andom (last)

Related articles
- History: Amda Seyon I's Expansions; Ethiopian–Adal War; British Expedition to Abyssinia; Ottoman–Ethiopian border conflicts Ethiopian–Egyptian War; Menelik's Expansions; Mahdist War; Italo-Ethiopian War of 1887–1889; First Italo-Ethiopian War; Second Italo-Ethiopian War; World War II; Korean War; United Nations Operation in the Congo; Eritrean War of Independence; 1964 Ethiopian-Somali Border War; Nigerian Civil War

The army of the Ethiopian Empire was the principal land warfare force of the Ethiopian Empire and had naval and air force branches in the 20th century. The organization existed in multiple forms throughout the history of the Ethiopian Empire from its foundation in 1270 by Emperor Yekuno Amlak, to the overthrow of the monarchy and Emperor Haile Selassie in 1974 by members of the Ethiopian army. Due to the country's position along multiple trade routes and its maintenance of independence against multiple Islamic and colonialist invasions lead to multiple conflicts against numerous major countries including the Ottomans, Egyptians, British, and Italians.

European contact with the Ethiopians in the 1500s brought the first firearms to the country although attempts to arm the imperial army with gunpowder weapons did not happen until the early 1800s. The Ethiopians attempted to develop modern weapons internally, but after a British expedition to the country resulted in the death of an emperor and an Ethiopian defeat, the empire increased its importation of weaponry. The method of raising a national army was also altered in the 1800s with a centralized permanent field army being established.

Unlike the majority of non-European armies, the Ethiopian army was able to successfully modernize in the late 19th century and saved the country from European colonialism until another Italian invasion in the 1930s. After regaining independence in 1941, the military saw massive modernization programs under the guidance of the British and Americans and served minor roles in international conflicts until internal conflicts diverted Ethiopia's foreign policy.

== Historical overview ==
=== Pre-19th century ===
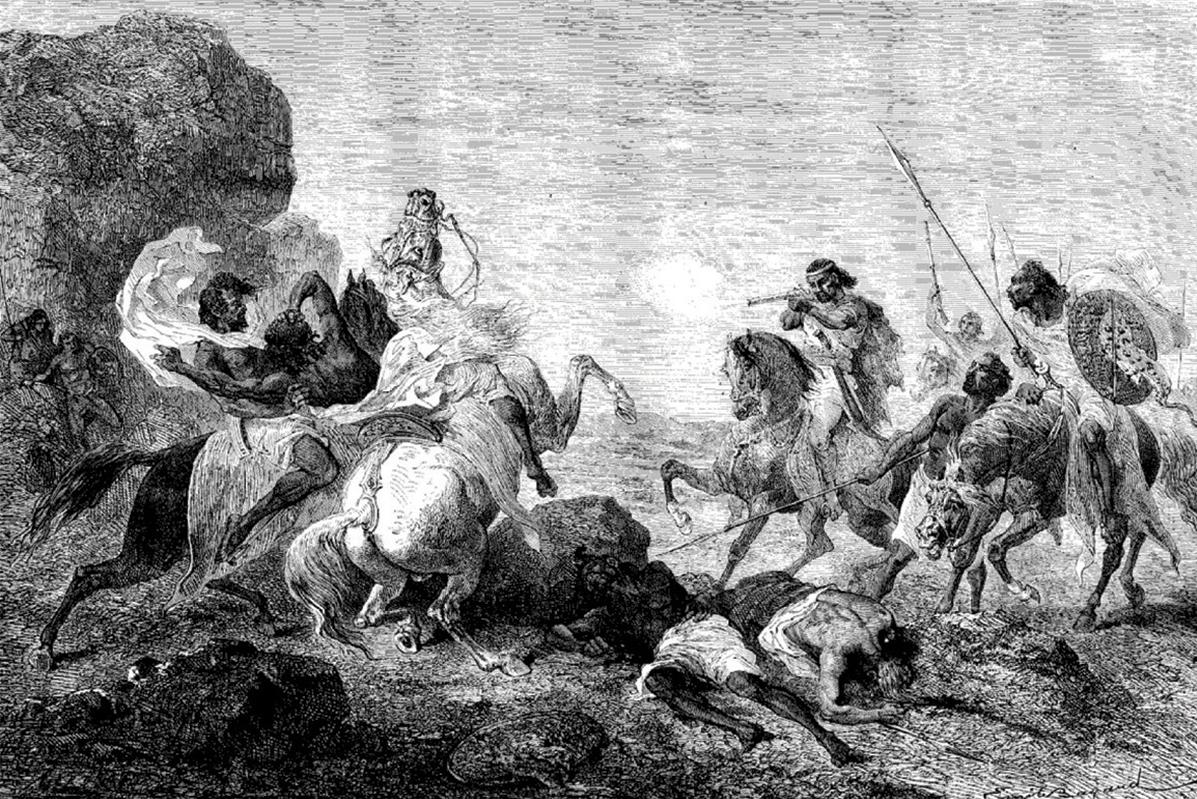
Engraving from the 1800s captioned "Abyssinian Warfare"

Equestrian culture in Ethiopia is one of the oldest in the continent of Africa. Horses were likely introduced to the Ethiopian Highlands from the Nile valley during the second half of the 2nd millennium BC. Equestrians and horse warriors in Ethiopia were called Feresenya (Amharic: ፈረስኛ), equivalent to the Arabic furusiyya, which was also the version of knight in Senterej."

In 1306, diplomatic envoys from Ethiopia arrived in Rome seeking diplomatic relations. In 1488, Bartolomeu Dias completed the first circumvention of the African continent reaching India and opening relations between the Portuguese and multiple African countries, including Ethiopia. In 1488, Ethiopian diplomats arrived in Lisbon, Portugal and Jesuit missionaries came to Ethiopia where they remained until their expulsion by Emperor Fasilides in 1632. Emperor Yeshaq I, according to the Islamic historian al-Maqrizi, hired a group of Mamluks led by al-Tabingha to train his army in gunnery and sword fighting. This is the earliest reference to firearms (Arabic naft) in Ethiopia.

On 9 April 1520, a Portuguese embassy led by Ambassadors Dom Rodrigo de Lima and Mateus, and included missionary Francisco Álvares, arrived in Massawa to negotiate with Emperor Dawit II over the possibility of an alliance against Muslim countries. On 21 February 1543, the Portuguese aided the Ethiopians defeat the Adal Sultanate at the Battle of Wayna Daga ending the fourteen year Ethiopian–Adal war.

In 1557, the Ottoman Empire invaded Ethiopia and conquered Massawa and other areas along the Red Sea coast. The Ottomans would remain in the area until 1863, when Isma'il Pasha became the Governor of the Egypt Eyalet and declared a Khedivate that was later recognized in 1867. By 1875, Isma'il had expanded his control to Berbera and Harar during the Ethiopian–Egyptian War, but following his deposition by the British and the Ethiopian victory in the war the areas were returned to their control. In 1884, the Bogos in Eritrea were returned to the Ethiopians through liquidations of Egypt by the British and Harar was conquered by Menelik II in 1886.

=== Modernization ===
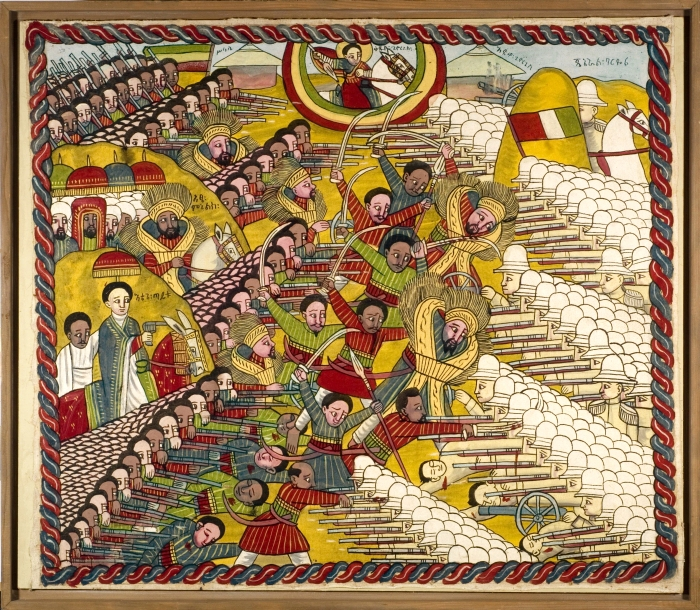
Depiction of the Battle of Adwa

In 1887, the Sudanese Mahdist State invaded the Gojjam and Begemder provinces as a part of the Mahdist War. From 9 to 10 March 1889, Emperor Yohannes IV met the Mahdists at the Battle of Gallabat where the Mahdists were defeated, but Yohannes IV was fatally wounded and died on 10 March. Due to the instability of the region from the Mahdist invasions the Ethiopians were unable to do anything to prevent the Italian colonization of Eritrea which took access to the Red Sea away from them.

The first firearms arrived in Ethiopia arrived during Yeshaq I's reign, but were not put to use. In the 1520s Dawit II purchased a small amount of Portuguese and Turkish firearms but large scale usage of them by both lay folk and nobility would not come until after the founding of Gonder. In 1828, Ras Sabagardis, the chief of the Tigray Province, sent his English servant to Bombay, Egypt, and England with requests for firearms and one hundred light cavalry. In India the servant found a surplus of outdated matchlocks belonging to the East India Company and Foreign Secretary Henry John Temple and the directors of the East India Company approved the transfer of 3,000 matchlocks in 1831. In 1839, Sahle Selassie, the King of Shewa, imported several cannons and was later given a mill to manufacture gunpowder by the French in 1840.

Northern Ethiopian spearheads were not serrated and heavily decorated like those of other African groups and were typically ribbed with lanceolate shapes. Two-pronged spears like the Bident and Military fork were common and these would all be thrusted with or thrown like javelins both on foot and horseback. Yeshaq I, according to the historian al-Maqrizi, hired a group of Mamluks to train his army in gunnery. This is the earliest reference to firearms (Arabic naft) in Ethiopia. In the 1520s, Lebna Dengel bought two swivel-guns from the Portuguese, as well as fourteen muskets acquired from Turks, he was thus ill equipped for the Ottoman backed invasion in 1527 which included thousands of Turkish and Arab flintlocks and matchlocks. By the time of Wayna Daga, however, the army was trained in gunfighting. During the Ottoman–Ethiopian War (1557–1589) the armies of Gelawdewos and Sarsa Dengel were able to defeat Turkish invasions with firearms obtained from the portuguese and captured from their Muslim foes.

During the Gondarine period guns became common among the royalty and aristocracy, and in the Zemene Mesafint period, among the peasantry. Sahle Selassie of Shewa later imported several canons in 1839 and by 1840 a French envoy had brought Sahle Selassie a mill to manufacture gunpowder along with 140 muskets. A British mission in 1842 visited Shoa and presented the Negus with 2 cannons, 300 muskets, and 100 pistols. His contemporaries like Sabagadis Woldu and Wube Haile Maryam would use their proximity to the sea in the north to obtain many firearms from the Europeans which they would use to counter the Ottomans to the west in the Ethiopian–Ottoman border conflict. By the time of the Italo-Ethiopian War of 1887–1889 nearly all warriors carried the most modern rifles of the time such as Remingtons. In 1900 Powell-Cotton stated Menelik II could put 500,000 rifles into the field along with 100 pieces of artillery. When an Ethiopian delegation led by Dejazmatch Mashasha visited Hamburg in 1907, a British ambassador in Germany states their hosts "were much astonished at the technical knowledge displayed by them in handling the weapons, and at their announcement that they themselves were in possession of most of the models shown"

==== British Expedition ====
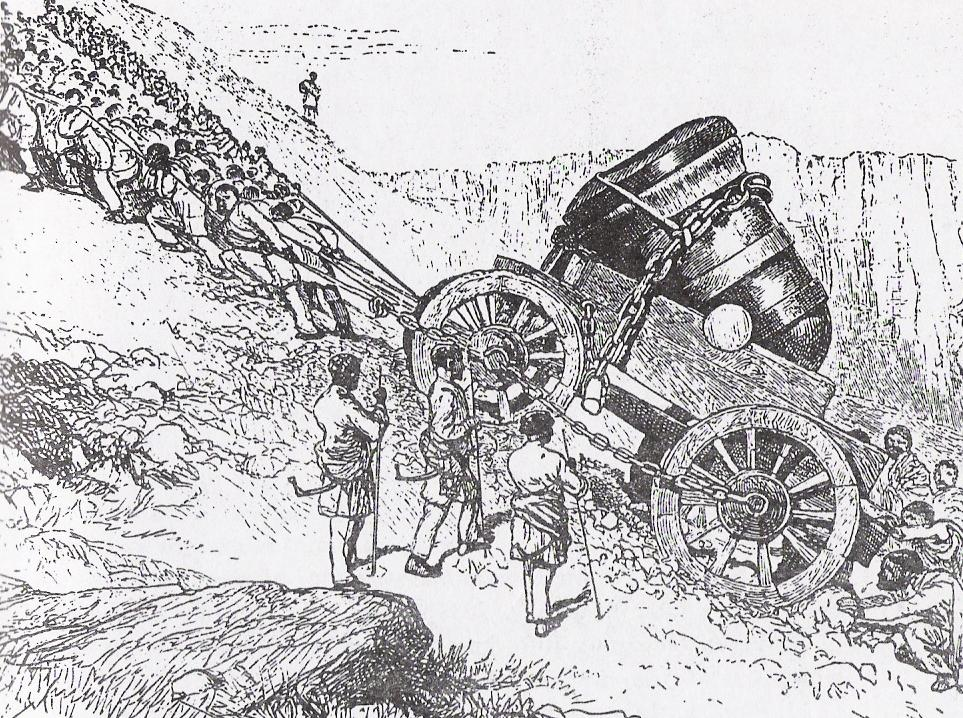
The Sebastopol mortar was an early attempt at creating modern weaponry inside Ethiopia

In 1855, Tewodros II became the emperor and had the goal of unifying the Ethiopians into a centralized state in order to establish the country as a regional power. In 1856, he defeated Negus Haile Melekot, who ruled over the semi-autonomous Shewa region, and started military campaigns against the Oromo. During the 1860s, he used European missionaries to work in road construction and on building a siege weapon.

Tewodros II also centralized the military by creating a permanent standing army from its historical practice of temporarily raising regional armies to create a national army. He also created a military hierarchy with titles going upward from commanders of ten, fifty, one thousand, and larger amounts of soldiers. Tewodros II also created an arsenal of modern weaponry in Magdala with 11,063 rifles, 875 pistols, 481 bayonets, 83,563 bullets, 15 cannons, 7 mortars, and 55 cannon shells. The Sebastopol, a massive mortar created at the Gafat foundry, was a prized weapon, but when it was used against the British it misfired and was unable to be used.

In 1864, Tewodros II imprisoned British consul Charles Duncan Cameron and multiple missionaries and ignored British ultimatums sent ordering his release. The British sent an army, equipped with modern military supplies and artillery, under the leadership of Robert Napier to free Cameron. On 10 April 1868, Ethiopian infantry armed with rifles and spears met the British at the Battle of Magdala and were easily defeated. Tewodros II later committed suicide after negotiations with the British had failed, but the British left after freeing Cameron and the missionaries having no intention of conquering Ethiopia.

==== First Italo-Ethiopian War ====
During the latter half of the 19th century the size of the Ethiopian field army rose dramatically. The largest army raised by Tewodros II during his reign was 15,000. In 1873, Emperor Yohannes IV raised an army of 32,000 soldiers, by 1876, he raised an army of 64,000 soldiers, and by 1880, he raised an army of 140,000 soldiers with 40,000 armed with rifles. While serving as the King of Shewa, Menelik II raised 80,000 soldiers in 1878, although only 4,000 had rifles, but by the time of the first war with the Italians he raised an army of 150,000 soldiers with the majority being equipped with modern weapons.

In 1879, Alfred Ilg arrived in the court of Menelik, seeking employment similar to Werner Munzinger who had helped Khedive Isma'il Pasha with the modernization of the Khedivate of Egypt, and aided in the modernization of Ethiopia's infrastructure and military. In 1887, the Ethiopian army was estimated to consist of over 145,000 soldiers with 88,000 infantry and 57,000 cavalry. The soldiers were armed with 71,000 firearms and 28,000 breechloaders.

On 3 June 1884, the Hewett Treaty was signed between Britain, Egypt and Ethiopia that allowed the Ethiopians to occupy parts of Eritrea and allowed the Ethiopian goods to pass in and out of Massawa duty-free. From the British viewpoint, it was highly undesirable for the French to replace the Egyptians in Eritrea as that would increase the amount of French naval bases on the Red Sea that could interfere with British shipping heading through the Suez Canal, but the British did not want the financial burden of ruling Eritrea so they looked for another country to replace the Egyptians. The Hewett treaty seemed to suggest that the land in Eritrea would be given to the Ethiopians as the Egyptians pulled out. After initially encouraging the Emperor Yohannes IV to move into Eritrea to replace the Egyptians, London decided to have the Italians move into Eritrea. In his history of Ethiopia, Augustus Wylde wrote: "England made use of King John Emperor Yohannes as long as he was of any service and then threw him over to the tender mercies of Italy...It is one of our worst bits of business out of the many we have been guilty of in Africa...one of the vilest bites of treachery".

In 1885, the Italians took over Massawa and Beilul and despite protests made by Menelik to Queen Victoria the Italians remained in the area. On 20 October 1887, the Italians and Ethiopians signed a treaty of friendship and alliance where both nations declared themselves allies, and the Italians promised to give weapons to the Ethiopians and to not annex more of their territory. The Treaty of Wuchale was signed on 2 May 1889, and another convention was held on 1 October 1889. The Treaty of Wuchale further expanded diplomatic relations between the countries, but despite the Italians recognizing Menelik as the Emperor of Ethiopia in the treaty the Foreign Affairs ministry sent telegrams to thirteen other countries describing Ethiopia as an Italian protectorate on 11 October 1889. The Ethiopians criticized the Italians as the Amharic and Italian versions of the treaty were not proper translations.

The Kingdom of Italy attempted to enforce their version of treaty onto the Ethiopians during the First Italo-Ethiopian War, but was defeated by Emperor Menelik II due to the vast arsenal of modern weapons and ammunition acquired though treaty negotiations and purchases from the French and the Russians. Russian adventurer Nikolay Leontiev organized the first modernized army battalion of the Ethiopian army in February 1899, the kernel of which became the company of volunteers of former soldiers he invited from Senegal, who were trained by Russian and French officers. The first Ethiopian military orchestra was organized at the same time.

==== Pre-World War I ====
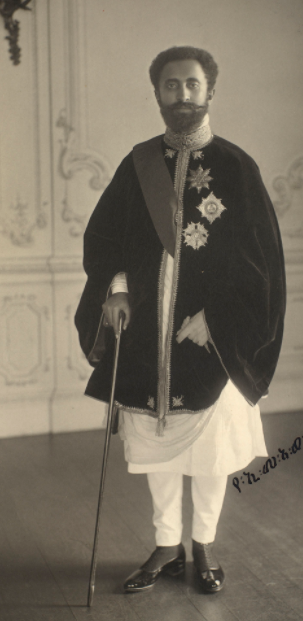
Prince Regent Haile Selassie in London during his tour of Europe

In 1883, the French arrived in modern-day Djibouti and established a protectorate although the border between the French colony and Ethiopia would not be formalized until 1897.

On 13 December 1906, the British, French, and Italians signed a Tripartite Treaty regarding economic activities in Ethiopia and also regulated the sale of weapons to the Ethiopians, which had before lacked any, with patrols in the Red Sea to enforce the weapon regulations. In 1920, the French attempted to have the weapons embargo lifted, but the Italians and British refused although the French would smuggle outdated weaponry through French Somaliland.

In 1911, around 60,000 stands of arms and 6,000,000 cartridges taken by the Japanese from Port Arthur during the Russo-Japanese War were sold to Ethiopia.

In 1905, the Ethiopians signed a weapons treaty with the German Empire and Austria-Hungary. On July 27, 1914, the Ethiopians and Austro-Hungarians made an agreement and paid for the transfer of 120 cannons from the Austrians to Ethiopians. However, the following day the Austro-Hungarians declared war on Serbia starting World War I and preventing the full transfer of the cannons.

==== World War I ====
During World War I the Ethiopian Empire remained neutral, but made attempts to side with the Entente Powers which were stopped by the Italians. Kaiser Wilhelm II attempted to convince the Ethiopians to join the Central Powers. Leo Frobenius and Salomon Hall were sent in attempts to enter Ethiopia, but were arrested in Italian Eritrea. Frederick Wilhelm von Syburg, the German ambassador to Ethiopia, attempted to convince the Ethiopians into joining the war through promises of access to the Red Sea, but was unsuccessful.

In 1915, Enderase Haile Selassie offered to give the Entente Powers 200,000 soldiers to aid in the defense of Egypt or to participate in the Middle Eastern theatre against the Ottoman Empire. At the time the Ethiopian army was in possession of 800,000–1,000,000 rifles produced in Germany and Belgium after 1911. In 1918, French Prime Minister Georges Clemenceau asked Italian Prime Minister Vittorio Emanuele Orlando on Selassie's behalf over the acceptance of 2,000 Ethiopian soldiers to fight in the war, but Orlando rejected the offer. Following the Russian Revolution and collapse of the Russian Empire, former Imperial Russian Army officers came to Ethiopia to train the Ethiopians.

==== Interwar Period ====
In 1917, Selassie established the Machine Gun Guards under the leadership of Gäbrä Yohannes Woldä Mädhen, who had served in the British army in Kenya as a NCO. In 1919, veterans of the East African campaign from World War I were assigned to serve in the unit. In 1924, the unit was issued grand uniforms after Selassie's tour throughout Europe and the unit was reorganized as the Imperial Bodyguard in 1928, with 5,000 guards.

During the 1920s Selassie sent military officers to be trained by the French at Saint-Cyr and had the members of his imperial bodyguard trained by Belgian military officers. During the Interwar period the majority of the world started disarmament projects, but Ethiopia did not and at one point held the fourth largest army in the world with over 500,000 soldiers behind the Soviet Union, China, and France.

In November 1922, Haile Selassie watched an air show of the British Royal Air Force in the Aden Province. After watching the show Selassie made attempts to create an air force and on 18 August 1929, a Potez 25-A2 was delivered to Addis Ababa and a Junkers W 33c was delivered on 5 September.

In 1928, around 2,000 unemployed German and Austrian men traveled to Ethiopia under the leadership of Herr Wodosch with the promise of receiving three acres of land and a cow after joining the Ethiopian army.

In 1931, Emperor Selassie asked the Japanese to accept an ambassador extraordinary delegation to be sent to Japan. The delegation, consisting of Teferi Gebre Mariam, Araya Abeba, and Daba Birrou, left Addis Ababa on September 30, 1931, with a Japanese diplomat and left Djibouti on October 5, to sail to Japan. The delegation toured Japan to inspect the Japanese Army and to learn how Ethiopia could modernize its country in a way similar to the Japanese. The Ethiopian delegation left Japan on December 28, and arrived in Addis Ababa on January 29, 1932.

==== Second Italo-Ethiopian War ====
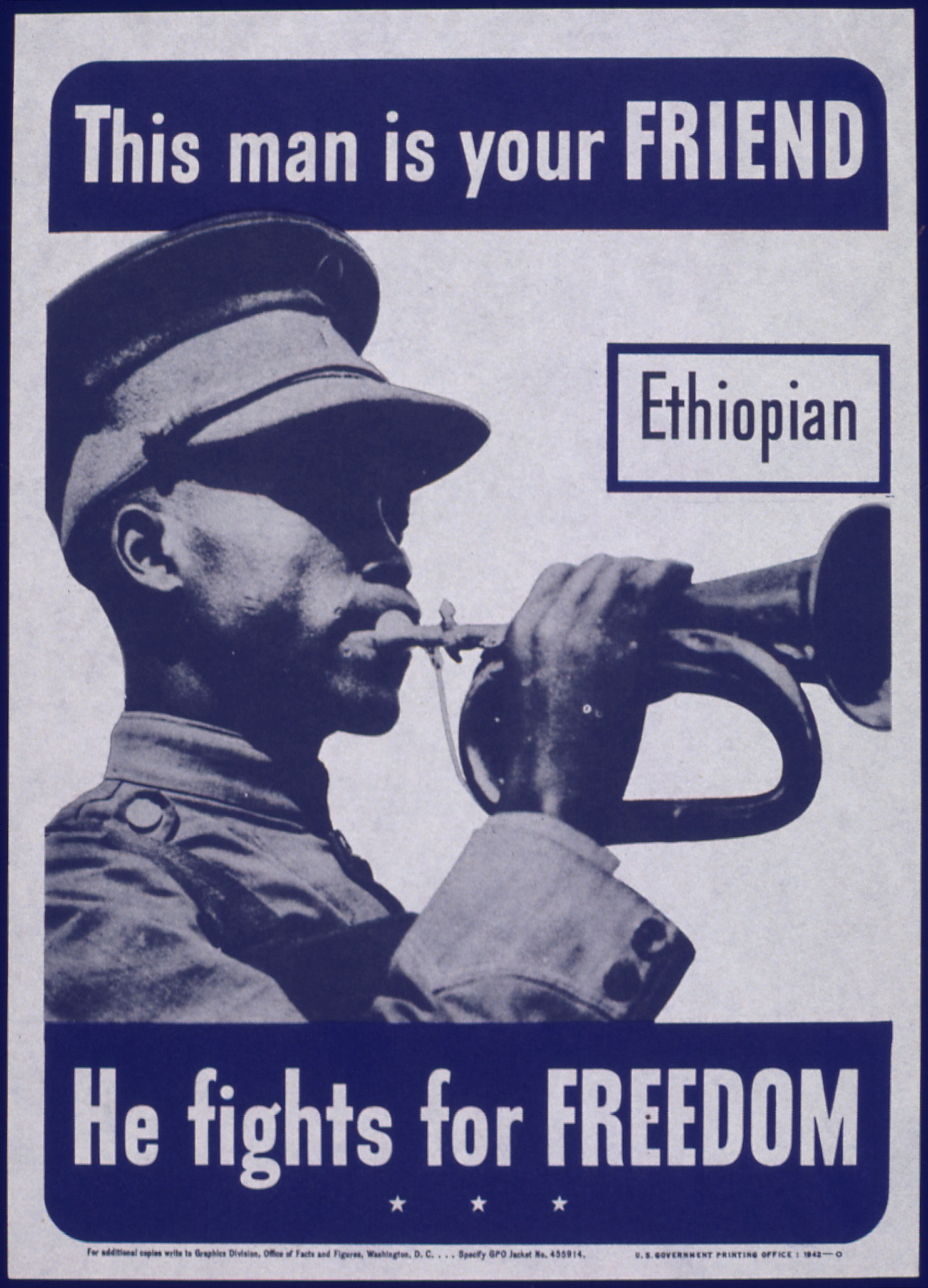
American propaganda poster during World War II

On 5 December 1934, a border skirmish between the Ethiopians and Italians occurred at Welwel where 107 Ethiopians and 21 Italians were killed. The Ethiopians asked for the United States to apply the Kellogg–Briand Pact against the Italians, but they refused.

The Ethiopian army was in possession of outdated infantry weapons, 10–11 million rifle cartridges, four tanks, and thirteen planes against the more numerous and technologically advanced Italian Army and air force. The army consisted of 40,000 regular soldiers and 500,000 irregular soldiers all with poor equipment with the nucleus of the army being the 7,000 royal guardsmen trained by Belgian officials. The weapons regulations and embargo that had been applied to Ethiopia since 1906 had hurt the Ethiopians with their army lacking munitions and supplies. Orders were placed for aircraft from Czechoslovakia, Switzerland, and Germany, but were not delivered before the war started.

Shortly before the war started military officials from Belgium and Sweden came to aid in the training of the Ethiopian army. Swedish Major General Eric Virgin helped to train Ethiopian infantry and artillery until he was sent back to Sweden on 1 October 1935, two days before the Italian invasion. In January 1935, a modern military school in Holeta Genet was created with the assistance of the Swedish with the intention of training military officers in modern military techniques over a span of sixteen month classes, but the first class was unable to graduate before the Italian invasion. Nazi Germany gave material support to the Ethiopians with 16,000 rifles, 600 machine guns, 3 airplanes, and 10 million rounds of ammunition as Führer Adolf Hitler wanted the Italians to be weakened before he attempted the Anschluss with the Federal State of Austria.

Fifty foreign mercenaries joined the Ethiopian forces, including Trinidadian pilot Hubert Julian, an official Swedish military mission under Captain Viking Tamm, the White Russian Feodor Konovalov and the Czechoslovak writer Adolf Parlesak. Several Austrian Nazis, a team of Belgian Fascists and Cuban mercenary Alejandro del Valle also fought for Haile Selassie. Many of these officers and volunteers were military advisers, pilots, doctors or supporters of the Ethiopian cause. Fifty mercenaries fought in the Ethiopian army and another fifty people were active in the Ethiopian Red Cross or non-military activities. The Italians later attributed most of the relative success achieved by the Ethiopians to foreigners or ferenghi and the Italian propaganda machine magnified the number to thousands, to explain away the Ethiopian Christmas Offensive of late 1935.

On 3 October 1935, 100,000 soldiers of the Italian Army commanded by Marshal Emilio De Bono attacked from Eritrea without prior declaration of war. The Italians used chemical weapons, in violation of the 1925 Geneva Protocol, effectively against the Ethiopian army, whose uniform consisted of light desert clothing and mostly barefoot soldiers. Chemical weapons were used in multiple battles and against thirteen towns from 22 December 1935 to 7 April 1936. In 1936, Addis Ababa was taken by the Italians and the last battle between the Italians and Ethiopians occurred on 19 February 1937. Shortly before the fall of Addis Ababa to the Italians Haile Selassie had fled from Ethiopia on board the British light cruiser HMS Enterprise (D52).

In a memorandum submitted to the Paris Peace Conference in 1946, the Ethiopian government stated that 275,000 soldiers had been killed in action, 78,500 were killed in hostilities during the occupation from 1936 to 1941, 17,800 women and children killed by the Italian bombings, 30,000 were killed in the reprisal massacre in Addis Ababa in mid-February 1937, 35,000 died in concentration camps, 24,000 people were killed in obedience to orders from summary courts, 30,000 people died after their villages had been destroyed, for a grand total of 760,300 civilian and military deaths as a result of the war and ensuing Italian occupation.

In addition to the Italian war crimes in violation of the Geneva Protocol and civilian massacres the Ethiopians engaged in war crimes. Some captured Italian soldiers and Eritrean Ascari were castrated as per Ethiopian military tradition. The Ethiopian army also utilized expanding bullets which had been prohibited by the 1899 Hague Convention.

==== Post–World War II ====
On 20 January 1941, Selassie entered Gojjam returning to Ethiopia after five years in exile. On 5 May 1941, Selassie entered Addis Ababa, and the remaining Italian soldiers in the country surrendered by January 1942.

Following the liberation of Ethiopia in 1941, Selassie started a campaign to transform the country into a more centralized monarchical state and modernization of the country's military with the ancient military hierarchy being abolished. In 1942, a military treaty was signed between Ethiopia and Britain where the British would provide military missions to assist in training and organizing an Ethiopian army that would be effective at restoring order and for the British to exercise control over the country's main cities and police the capital. Selassie also organized a Territorial Army that would serve to defeat the guerrilla organizations throughout the country, but the army never advanced past policing local areas.

The British Military Mission to Ethiopia (BMME) under the leadership of General Stephen Butler aided in the training and rearmament of the Ethiopians. By 1942, the reorganized Ethiopian army was in possession of 250 horses, 2,100 mules, two artillery batteries, an armored car regiment of 205 soldiers, and 148 officers were trained in methods similar to those at the Royal Military College. By 1958, the army was in possession of rifles from the British, Czechoslovak, Italians, and Americans, 500 carbines, 590 machine guns, 432 mortars, 20 old Czechoslovak light tanks and 5 M24 Chaffees, 28 armored cars, 90 field artillery, 12 old antitank weapons, and 120 heavy mortars. The Imperial Bodyguard had 3,100 soldiers spread across seven battalions by 1946, and would continue to be the main focus of the Ethiopian army until an attempt coup by the organization against Selassie in 1960.

After the Italian armies were defeated in North and East Africa the British started selling the captured Italian weapons to the Ethiopians, but at high prices resulting in the army limiting its purchases to small arms. In 1944, the Ethiopians rejected arm sales from the British due to price gouging and started buying military supplies from the Americans although the United States could only sell a fraction of the requested supplies. In 1947, the sale of 10,000 outdated rifles was easily approved by the British War Office due to their being over 290,000 tons of them being stored in Egypt. After the Ethiopian-American Mutual Defense Agreement was signed in 1953 the United States sent $3,800,000 worth of small arms, field artillery, and military vehicles to Ethiopia.

The budget for defense and internal security was expanded by forty percent. The air force was trained by Swedish officers, a small coastal navy was organized under the supervision of Norwegian naval officers, Israeli advisers trained paratroopers, Indian officers staffed a military school in Harer, and officers in the Ethiopian army were sent to attend schools in the United States, Britain, and Yugoslavia.

From 1953 to 1970, the United States gave Ethiopia $147 million in military aid and was the main receipt of all American military aid to Africa. In 1960, the United States made a secret agreement with Ethiopian to help train and equip an army of 40,000 soldiers to fight against the Somali Republic and rebels in Eritrea. The United States was given the Kagnew Station in 1953, where over 3,000 Americans were later sent to staff the naval communications and satellite systems base there. An investigation by the United States Senate in 1970 uncovered the military agreements between Ethiopia and the United States. However, by 1973, the Ethiopians were no longer prioritized by the United States, which decreased its military aid and presence at military bases throughout the country.

On 13 December 1960, the Imperial Bodyguard attempted a coup d'état while Selassie was outside of the country. Prince Amha Selassie and twenty cabinet ministers were captured by the coup members, but the main army remained loyal to the emperor. When Selassie returned to Addis Ababa on 17 December, the army defeated the coup.

Following the 1960 coup by the Imperial Bodyguard and the threat of an independent Somalia the army was enlarged to over 28,000 soldiers by 1962, and over 30,000 the next year. In 1966, the army had been expanded to over 38,000 soldiers and a five-year plan was started in 1968 to further expand the army to over 46,000 soldiers.

==== Military activity (1950–1974) ====
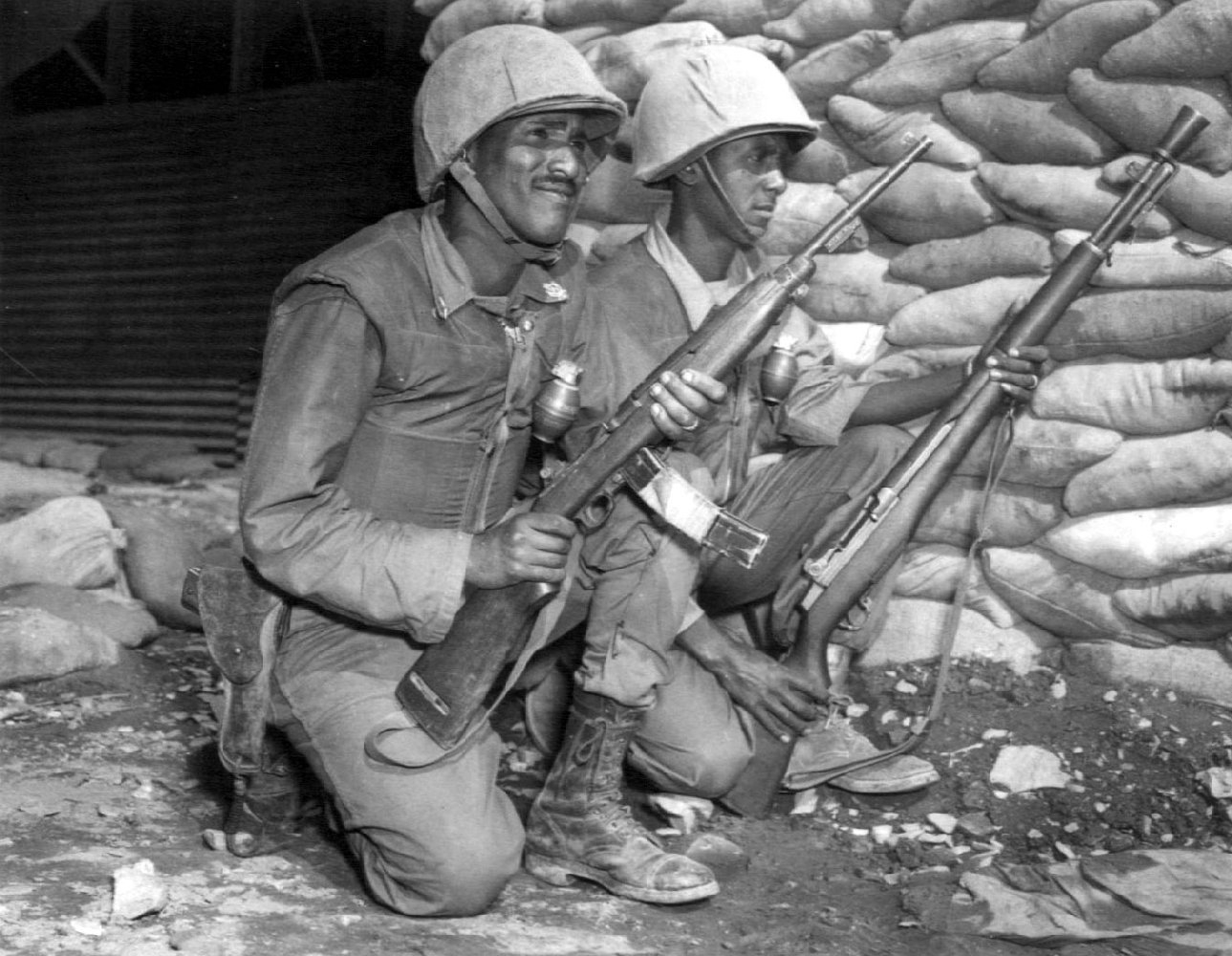
Ethiopian soldiers in the Kagnew Battalion during the Korean War

In 1941, the British occupied Italian East Africa and placed Eritrea under British Military Administration. In 1947, the treaty officially declaring peace between Italy and the Allies was ratified. It included a clause stating that if the Allies were unable to find a solution on what to do with the former Italian colonies within a year, the matter would be brought to the United Nations General Assembly. On 15 September 1948, the Allies brought the fate of Italy's three colonies in Somalia, Libya, and Eritrea to the General Assembly and on 21 November 1949, it was decided that Eritrea would be given to Ethiopia. On 15 September 1952, the United Nations voted forty six to ten, with four abstaining, in favor of a federation between Ethiopia and Eritrea. In 1955, the Imperial Ethiopian Navy was formed as the country now had access to the Red Sea via Eritrea.

On 25 June 1950, North Korea invaded South Korea starting the Korean War. In 1951, three battalions of Ethiopian soldiers were sent, under the leadership of Lieutenant Colonels Täshomä Ergtäu, Asfaw Andargé and Woldä Yohannes Sheta, to aid the South Koreans. Following the armistice two more battalions were sent. In 1960, four battalions were sent to join the United Nations forces during the Congo Crisis, but they saw no action.

On May 22, 1953, a U.S.-Ethiopian Mutual Defense Assistance Agreement was signed. A U.S. Military Assistance Advisory Group was dispatched to Ethiopia and began its work by reorganizing the army into three divisions. On 25 September 1953, Selassie created the Imperial Ministry of National Defense that unified the Army, Air Force, and Navy. By 1956, the First Division had its headquarters at Addis Ababa (First, Second, Third Brigades, 5,300 strong); the Second Division was headquartered at Asmara, with the Fifth, Sixth, Seventh, Eighth, and Twelfth Brigades (4,500 strong); and Third Division Harar (የ3ኛ ክፍለ ጦር, with the Fourth, Ninth, Tenth, and Eleventh Brigades, 6,890 strong) respectively.

The three divisions had a total of 16,832 troops. In May 1959, the Emperor established the Imperial Territorial Army as a reserve force that provided military training to civil servants.

In 1960 the U.S. Army Area Handbook for Ethiopia described the very personalized command arrangements then used by the Emperor:

The Emperor is by constitutional provision Commander-in-Chief, and to him are reserved all rights respecting the size of the forces and their organization and command, together with the power to appoint, promote, transfer and dismiss military officers. He seeks the advice and consent of Parliament in declaring war. Traditionally, he assumes personal command of the forces in time of war.'

Ethiopia's participation in peacekeeping efforts ended in the 1960s, as the army had to focus on the Eritrean revolts and Somali border skirmishes.

==== Derg ====
In February 1974, the military overthrew the government of Prime Minister Aklilu Habte-Wold. In April, the army arrested twenty five officials on corruption charges and attempted to detain fifty other officials. On 21 June 1974, the Derg, a committee of low-ranking military officers and enlisted men, was formed. On 28 June, the Derg seized the radio station in Addis Ababa and the Ethiopian Army arrested more officials who had been members of the previous government for attempting to prevent reform attempts by Prime Minister Endelkachew Makonnen. The leadership of the military stated that they had no plans to overthrow either Emperor Selassie or Prime Minister Makonnen. However, on 22 July, Makonnen was arrested by the orders of the military.

On September 12, 1974, the Derg deposed Emperor Haile Selassie, ending the monarchy which had been established in 1270. The army of the Ethiopian Empire was reorganized into the army of the Provisional Military Government of Socialist Ethiopia and later into that of the People's Democratic Republic of Ethiopia. Following the collapse of the communist dictatorship, the military was reorganized again into the Ethiopian National Defense Force; the navy was eventually disbanded in 1996.

== Military dress ==
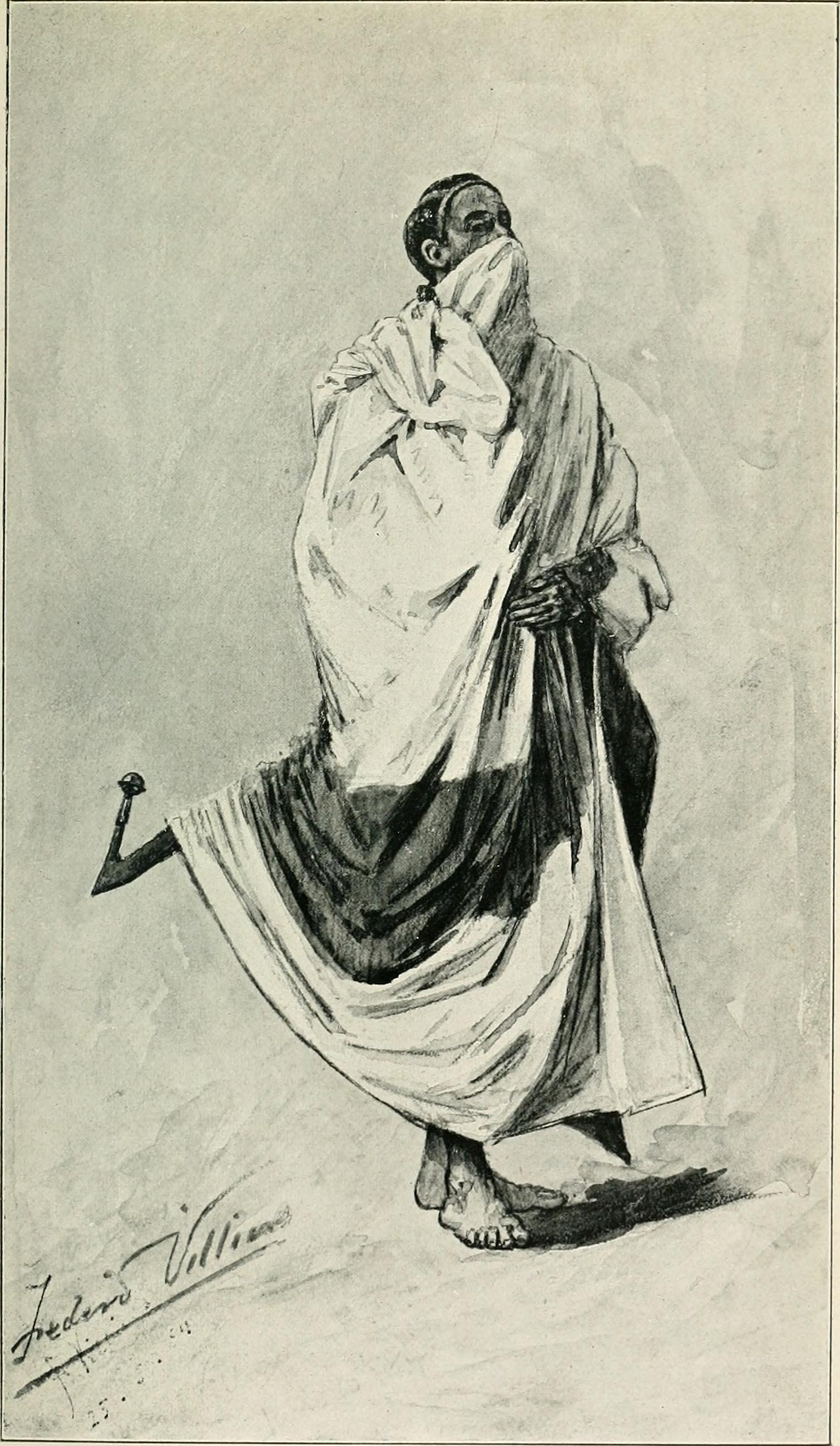
1907 engraving of an Ethiopian soldier with Shotel

Among the earlier Chewa regiments, hunting traditions played an important role in the upbringing of a Chewa warrior. The killings of wild beasts were rewarded by the patron, or Mekwuanint, to whom the Chewa belonged to. An elephant killer would wear a silver chain around his neck and a gold earring in his right ear. A rhinoceros killer would be awarded a cross earring and a gold chain with silk threads for his neck. Along with these jewelry gifts, prizes of weaponry were also frequent.

Like the shields of other Horn African peoples and the nearby Beja, the Gasha was strapped along the forearm, enabling the wearer to simultaneously hold a horse's reins and ride, it unlike in the west where designs like center grip shields were commonplace.

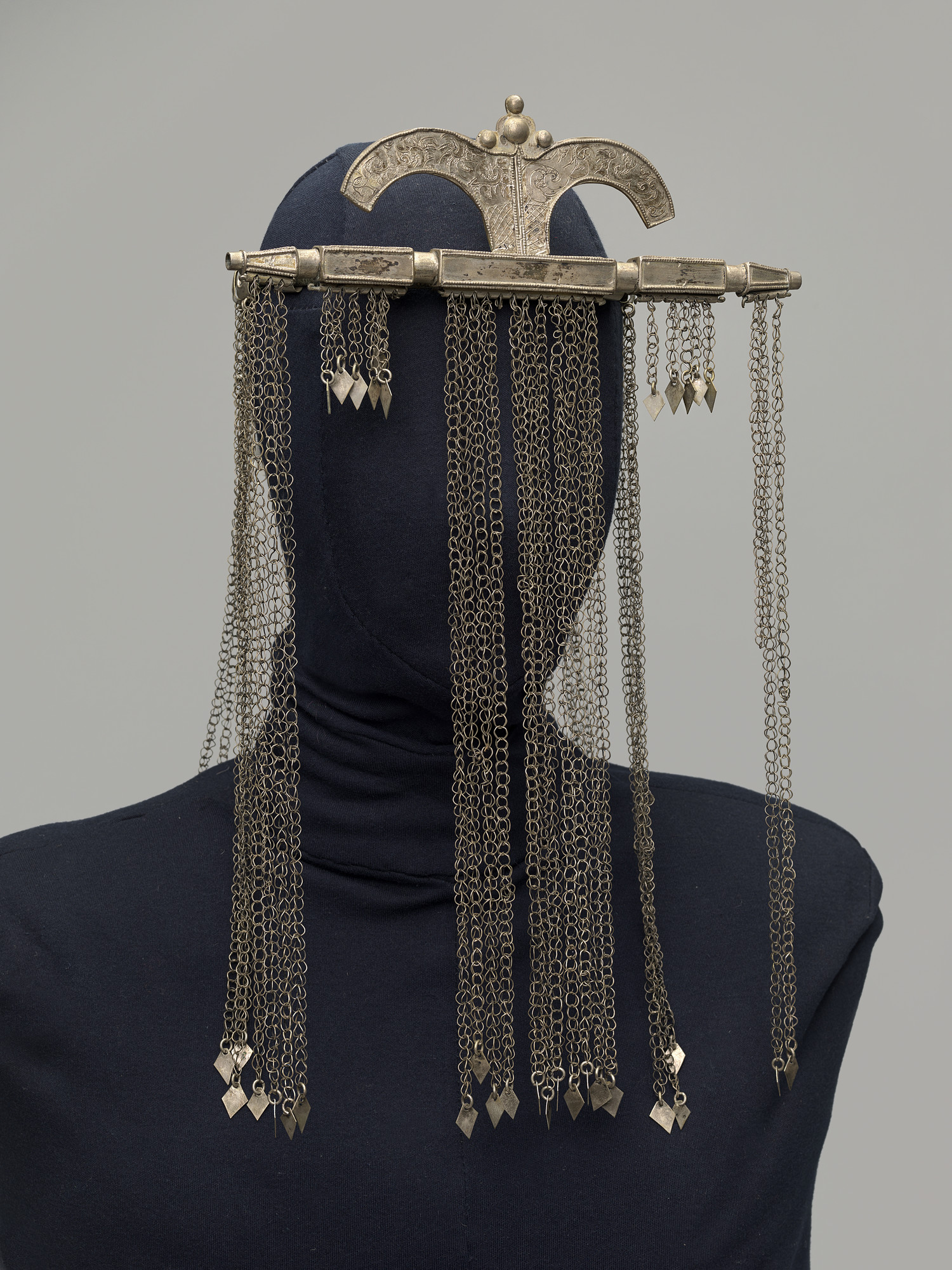
The "Akodama," a headdress worn by the noblemen of Shewa

Noble and warrior head ornaments include the tiara of the rulers of Shewa surmounted with (white) Egret feathers like that of Sahle Selassie, the golden "aklil ras wärq" diadems, and Akodama (alt. aqwédama) chain headdresses which were also worn in conjunction with plumage in Shewa as was the culture of the region.

Both Portuguese and Arab accounts state that the medieval Ethiopian imperial army were outfitted in chain mail with quilted barding similar to a gambeson which was also commonplace across the Sahel. Most notable were the tailors of Dawit II in Berārah , one of the most significant cities in the middle ages which is where horse armor was produced. The bitäwa was a vambrace or Armlet presented by the emperor to a "the most successful warriors" for "bravery and honour in battle" and worn on the right hand, made of gold and laid with jewels. The repousse work on one Bitawa would suggest that it "may have been produced in either Ankobar or Gondar."

British journalist Augustus Wylde described the Ethiopians during the time of Menelik II as having hair "plaited in strands, which were together at the back of their heads, like that of all Abyssinians who have killed their man in battle." William Cornwallis Harris, who travelled to the Kingdom of Shewa, and other foreigners describe northern Ethiopian men as braiding their hair and smattering it with butter. Initially this was restricted to warriors, with a braid added for every enemy slain, but became common among the wider population. This is a traditional women's hairstyle among the Amhara and Tigrayans, but was also found among prominent leaders such as Tewodros II, Yohannes IV, and his sons Mengesha and Araya Selassie Yohannes.

== See also ==
- 1868 Expedition to Abyssinia
- Battle of Dogali
- Ethiopian order of battle in the Second Italo-Ethiopian War
- Ethiopian military titles
- Ethiopian aristocratic and court titles
