= Sela Dingay =

Town in central Ethiopia

- Town
- Location in Ethiopia
- Coordinates: 9°58′N 39°38′E
- Country: Ethiopia
- Region: Amhara
- Zone: Semien Shewa
- Elevation: 2,880 m (9,450 ft)

Population (2005)
  - Total: 2,707 (est)
- Time zone: UTC+3 (EAT)

Sela Dingay is a town in central Ethiopia. In Amharic the name means the sharpened stone, named for a rock which rolled over the edge of the southern rim of the gorge of the Mofar River, and killed a group of people sitting on it. Located in the Semien Shewa Zone of the Amhara Region, this town has a latitude and longitude of 09°58′N 39°38′E with elevations variously given as 2880 and 2915 meters above sea level. It is the administrative center of Mojana Wadera woreda.

== History ==
According to Antonio Cecchi, Sela Dingay was founded by Wossen Seged in 1804, naming the town after the historic district of Sela Dingay, although the local Debre Mitmaq church had been founded by Emperor Zara Yaqob, where he convened the Council of Debre Mitmaq in 1450 which resolved a rift in the Ethiopian Church over the observance of the Sabbath. In any case, Negus Wossen Seged built a second church for the town. When Johann Ludwig Krapf visited Sela Dingay in March 1842, it was the residence of the Queen Dowager Zenebework. Following the conquest of Shewa by the newly crowned Emperor Tewodros II and the death of Negus Haile Melekot in 1855, the dowager queens retired to Sela Dingay, where Bezabish died around 1870 or 1871.

One of the military maneuvers that led to the Battle of Segale in 1916 was Negus Mikael's occupation of Sela Dingay 14 October. This threatened Ras Leul Seged's left flank, forcing him to withdraw to Ankober. Despite his action, the Ras's army was annihilated four days later.

On 19 February 2024, an ENDF drone struck a truck of full of civilians returning from a baptism near the town of Sela Dingay resulting in at least 30 civilian deaths.

== Demographics ==
Based on figures from the Central Statistical Agency in 2005, Sela Dingay has an estimated total population of 2,707 of whom 1,435 are men and 1,272 are women. The 1994 census reported this town had a total population of 1,482 of whom 721 were men and 761 were women.
