= Battle of Azule =

1886 major battle of Menelik's conquests in Ethiopia

- Part of Menelik's Expansions
Date	6 September 1886; 140 years ago
Location	Azule, Ethiopia
Result	Shewan victory

Belligerents
(Ethiopian Empire) Shewa: Supported by: France (arms): United Kingdom (arms)	Arsi Oromo

Commanders and leaders
Ras Darge Sahle Selassie	Arsi Oromo

Strength
~10,000	15,000?

Casualties and losses
Minimal	6,000–12,000

The Battle of Azule, was fought on 6 September 1886, between the forces of Ras Darge Sahle Selassie of Shewa and a force of Arsi Oromo. It was part of a broader series of expansion campaigns done under Menelik II, Negus of Shewa, referred to by some historians as the Agar Maqnat. The battle of Azule was important as it represents the crushing of a large Arsi army by one under Menelik; it also demonstrates the dynamic of gun-wielding Shewans fighting Spear-wielding Arsi that many historians like to stress when discussing Menelik's expansions; it also retains symbolic and historic importance in the politics and identities of many. The battle formed part of a broader series of military campaigns conducted during the late nineteenth century that led to the incorporation of southern territories into the expanding Ethiopian Empire.

== Background ==
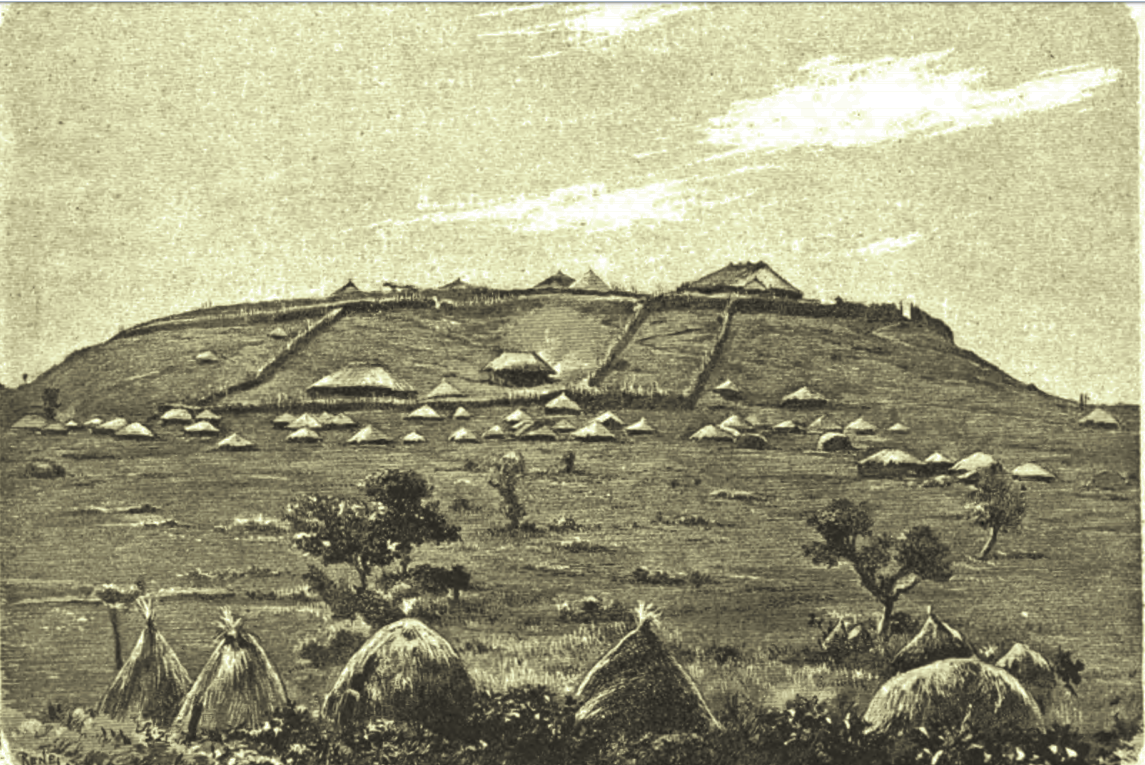
A Katama built by Ras Darge in the Chercher province.

Ras Darge Sahle Selassie arrived in Arsi-country with the Negus Menelik II's army. Though Menelik II eventually left Arsi-country, Darghe stayed and established a Katama (roughly: garrison / camp) at Azule. The Katama had 3 layers, each fortified by a wall.

In the early 1880s, imperial forces began advancing into Arsi territories as part of a broader campaign to extend imperial authority southward. The Arsi Oromo, who were organized under the Gadaa system, an indigenous socio-political institution based on age-set governance, mounted sustained resistance against imperial expansion.

Between approximately 1880 and 1886, Arsi forces engaged imperial troops in a series of confrontations, reportedly employing guerrilla tactics and local knowledge of terrain to ambush advancing units. Some historical accounts note that Arsi fighters achieved temporary successes in several engagements, delaying imperial advances for a number of years despite facing opponents equipped with modern firearms.During the campaign, Shewan forces led by Ras Darge relied heavily on modern firearms and munitions obtained through European trade, particularly from French and British suppliers. These firearms provided a decisive technological edge over the Arsi Oromo, who mounted a prolonged defense using traditional strong cavalry, spear, and shield tactics organized under their sophisticated Gadaa system.

== Battle ==
Ras Darge Sahle Selassie, through the use of informants, knew of the Arsi plan to attack his Katama on September 6, 1886. Therefore, he organized his gunmen along the second wall of his Katama. Darghe planned for his gunmen to hold fire until the Arsi had successfully entered the first layer of his Katama. This way, they would be trapped when the order was given to start gunfire. When the Arsi Oromo attacked, Darghe's gunmen, either scared or trigger happy, opened fire before Darghe's order. The result was still an overwhelming Shewan success, but many sources record Darghe punishing his commanders, some of whom were his sons. In the months following this victory, Darge subdued Arsi but did not move to annex the southern Bale province.

The conflict culminated in September 1886 near Aanole, where imperial forces led by Ras Darge Sahle Selassie confronted Arsi fighters in a decisive engagement. Contemporary and later sources describe heavy casualties among Arsi combatants during the battle. Following their defeat, an armistice is reported in some accounts to have been declared between imperial authorities and local Arsi leaders.

== Aftermath ==
Events that took place at Anole in 1886 are described in Oromo oral traditions and in some modern historical works. According to these accounts, imperial representatives convened a meeting with Arsi leaders to negotiate terms of submission and future administration. During this gathering, punitive measures were allegedly carried out against members of the local population, including the mutilation of men and women.

These events are remembered in Oromo oral historiography as Harmaaf Harka Muraa Aanolee (“the mutilation of hands and breasts at Aanole”). Interpretations of the incident, including its scale and historical verifiability, vary among historians and remain the subject of scholarly debate.
