= Abichu Oromo =

Subclan of Oromo people

The Abichu Oromo are a subclan of the Tulama group of the Oromo people. They lived in the Shewa province of Ethiopia.

In 1841 William Cornwallis Harris mentioned them as allies of King Sahle Silassie of Shewa. The Abichu rebelled against his son, Haile Melekot, by attempting to retake Tegulet and marching on Ankober.

In the later 1800s the Abyssinians, who were Christians, were given firearms by Europeans to help colonize non-Christians. When the group were pushed south into other Oromo territory conflicts rose between the clans.

The Abichu, like other Oromo clans, were also attacked by the Amhara Christians. Around the city of Debre Birhan, the Abichu were attacked and evicted in a single day.
