= Zenebework =

Woizero Zenebework was the wife of Wossen Seged, Merid Azmach of Shewa; the mother of Negus Sahle Selassie, the first Negus of Shewa; the grandmother of Negus Haile Melekot of Shewa; and the great-grandmother of Emperor Menelik II. Woizero Zenebework held the powerful districts of Menz and Tegulet as her personal fiefs.

Zenebework was the most powerful woman in Shewa during the reigns of her husband, son and grandson. Despite the efforts of Sahle Selassie to resolve the ongoing theological disputes that affected the Ethiopian Church in Shewa, she intervened on behalf of the Sost Lidat, which led to an edict on 24 November 1841 which purged all of the clergy who did not embrace that view on the nature of Christ. She joined her daughter-in-law Bezabish in betraying her grandson Haile Melekot by submitting to Emperor Tewodros II of Ethiopia when he invaded Shewa in 1855 to forcefully re-incorporate it into the Empire.
