= Arsi Province =

Former province in Ethiopia

Coordinates: 7°45′N 39°30′E

Location of Arsi within the Ethiopian Empire

Arsi Province (Amharic: አርሲ) was a province of Ethiopian Empire with its capital at Asella. Historically a part of the Emirate of Harar until its invasion by Menelik II and subsequent incorporation into modern Ethiopia. The province was reduced to a Zone of the Oromia Region with the adoption of the new constitution in 1995. In more ancient times, the region is seemingly related to the Harla.

Both the Zone and the former province are occupied by the Arsi Oromo, who inhabit both the former Bale and Arsi provinces.

== History ==
Prior to the 16th century, the Arsi territory was part of Dawaro and Hadiya. The parts of Arsi country bordering Shewa were targeted for expansion by Sahle Selassie in the 1840s, but full-scale conquest only began in 1881. Between 1881 and 1886, Emperor Menelik II and his lieutenants launched six major campaigns, initially facing significant resistance and limited success. A brutal turning point in the conflict occurred when many captured Arsi Oromo fighters and chiefs, along with thousands of men and women, were gathered for systematic mutilation. Before being allowed to return home, the right hands of men and the breasts of women were severed and tied around their necks. This mass mutilation was intended to hasten Arsi surrender and deter future uprisings against Shewan rule. Although the exact number of victims remains unknown, estimates suggest thousands suffered. As Ras Darge Sahle Selassie had predicted, the Arsi were horrified and demoralized by the atrocity. After six years of intense fighting, fear and exhaustion left them with no choice but to surrender. Ras Darge Sahle Selassie then established Arsi as a province under his rule until his death in 1900.

Despite early Islamic influences and contacts with Islamized societies, it was the imperial conquest and the subsequent weakening of local institutions that accelerated the Arsi's conversion to Islam. By the end of the 19th century, the Arsi embraced Islam en masse as a way to maintain cultural distance from their Christian Amhara rulers and preserve their identity. From the outset, their practice of Islam was syncretic, closely tied to the cult of Shaykh Husayn of Bale.

The region's fertile highlands, ideal for cereal cultivation, were historically controlled by generals loyal to Emperor Menelik II, reducing local peasants to tenant farmers. Following this, the Arsi country then became home to Shewan Oromo (Tulama), Gurage, and Amhara communities. These "newcomers" are often referred to locally as neftenya ("armed settlers"), though many are descendants of poor farmers from the north. The Amhara arrived as soldiers and settlers during and after the conquest at the end of the 19th century. Throughout the 20th century, especially in the 1930s, this fertile land continued to attract immigrants from the north, encouraged by the government for economic, political, and demographic reasons. The Chilalo Agricultural Development Union (CADU), launched by the Swedish International Development Agency (SIDA), aimed to modernize agriculture but failed to address land tenure issues, resulting in tenant evictions. In response, SIDA pressured Emperor Haile Selassie I to implement agrarian reform, which only materialized after the 1974 Ethiopian Revolution.

Under the Derg regime, land reform policies were extended to Arsi, focusing on mechanized state farms. However, small farmers were marginalized, and the radical villagization campaign of 1985-86 forcibly relocated families into standardized villages. SIDA withdrew from the region in protest. Despite these challenges, agricultural production remained strong, and the population grew from 850,000 in 1970 to 2.64 million in 2000. The western part of the zone, particularly around Asella saw rapid growth.

== See also ==
- History of Ethiopia
