= Darge Sahle Selassie =

Ethiopian governor and noble (1825/1830–1900)

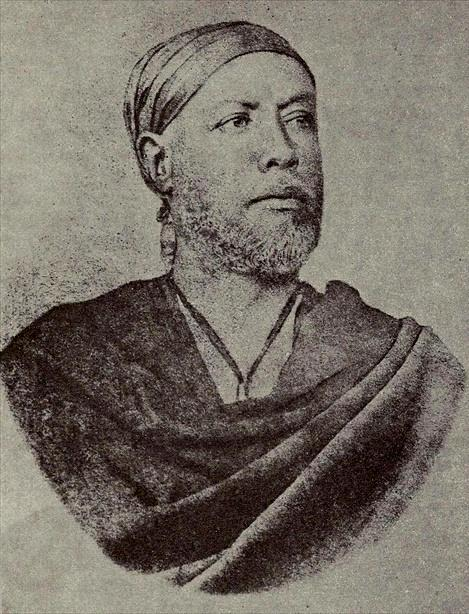
- Born: 1825 1827 or 1830; Ankober
- Died: 23 March 1900 (aged 70-75)
- Father: Negus Sahle Selassie of Shewa
- Mother: Woizero Wurige
- Religion: Ethiopian Orthodox

Darge Sahle Selassie (circa 1825–1830 (Note: Various sources give different year of birth. 1825, 1827, 1830) – 23 March 1900), Horse name Abba Gersa, was a 19th-century Ethiopian nobleman, provincial governor, general and a trusted councillor of his nephew Emperor Menelik II.

== Ancestry ==
He is a male line descendant of Shewan Amhara rulers through his father Negus Sahle Selassie of Shewa. His mother was Woizero Wurige (Note: Her name is also spelled as Warrayega) belonging to the Silt’e; she was a mistress of his father.

He was half-brother to Negus Haile Melekot, Sayfu Sahle Selassie and Haile Mikael Sahle Selassie, and had at least five other half sisters.

== Biography ==
=== Early life ===
Darge was born and brought up in Ankober, and just like his half brothers received ecclesiastical education in his childhood in one of the monastic schools in northeastern Shewa, and may have shaped his interest in theological discussions and reading the scriptures later in life. Darge also received training in equestrian and war-like exercises.

=== Death of Negus Sahle Selassie and rebellions ===
In October 1847 Darge's father, Sahle Selassie the king of Shewa died. His half brother Haile Melekot succeeded as the Negus, while Sayfu Sahle Selassie governed Merhabete and the eastern lowlands. Darge and his half-brother Haile Mikael Selassie were to live under the guardianship of Haile Melekot and Sayfu. Darge was associated mostly with Sayfu Sahle Selassie until around 1857.

Following immediately on the death of Sahle Selassie, the Oromos of Shewa rebelled. They marched into Amhara areas and destroyed a number of sites among which was Sala-Dengay (Note: A monastery where Negus Sahle Selassie received his education.) Darge and Sayfu started their military campaign against the Oromos in Selale governate. Before long, they secured Fiche, the capital of the region. The two princes alongside the military commander Garmame pacified the Oromo rebels in Gembeccu, Gulale, Meta and Baco. They set up their central camp around Entoto. To ensure stability of these regions, the two princes settled a number of Amhara farmers in the regions of Lume and Ad'a. Shewa was relieved of any major Oromo rebellions until 1855.

=== Captivity ===
During Emperor Tewodros II advances to reconquer Shewa into the Ethiopian Empire in 1855, the demoralized and ailing king Haile Melekot entrusted his brother Darge to safeguard Menelik (then called Sahle Maryam) in the event of a restoration of the kingdom. Haile Melekot succumbed to his disease and was buried in the church at Debre Bag in December. Darge meanwhile had fled with Menelik and some units of the Shewan army towards Minjar, a fertile plateau between the Kasam and Awash rivers. The Emperor sent Ras Engeda and his troops in pursuit of the heir, and applied constant pressure to Darge's dwindling force. In a gracious and conciliatory gesture Tewodros II visited Haile Melekot's funeral which left Darge with an impression; and after learning that the Emperor had shown clemency towards Shewan soldiers and officials who submitted, and that he had announced publicly that he would treat Menelik as a son. Darge and his party finally surrendered.

Darge and his nephew Menelik II were the chief Shewan prisoners taken with the Emperor to Gondar, and later to the mountain citadel at Magdala (the modern Amba Mariam). Abeto Darge as he was then called, had been among the Shewan leaders that had tried to rally the resistance against the Emperor in the name of the young prince his nephew, and Tewodros had admired Darge's efforts. Although technically prisoners, the two Shewan princes enjoyed the Emperor's affection and favor, and were greatly honored and respected at his court. Darge was especially admired for his military skills. When Emperor Tewodros eventually decided to marry his daughter Alitash Tewodros to Menelik, Darge (now titled a Fitawrari) presided as the family elder of the Shewan Royal House.

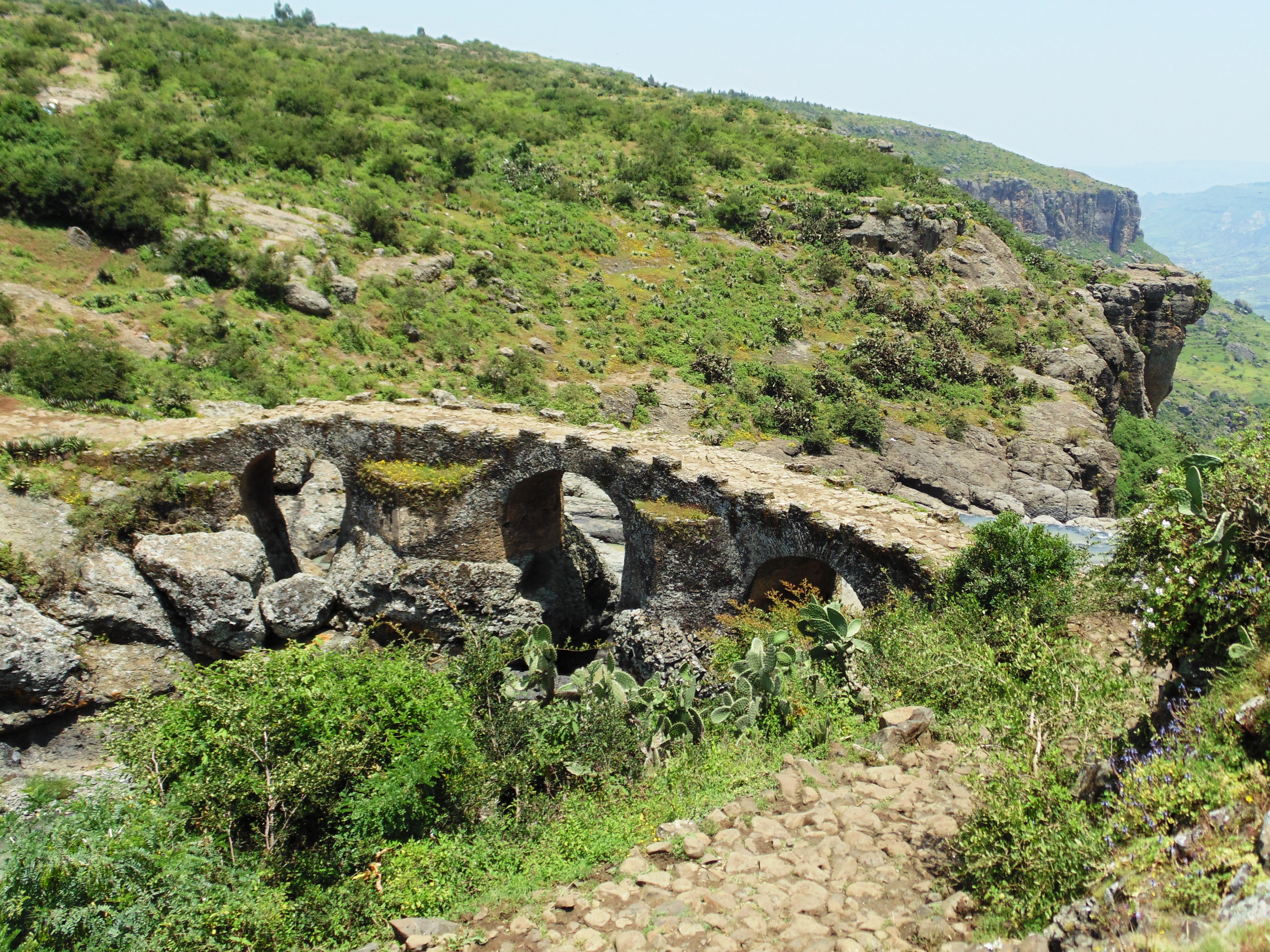
Bridge built under Ras Darge's rule as governor of Shewa near Debre Libanos

Darge was part of the Shewan party that helped Menelik escape from Magdala in order to return to Shewa and reclaim his throne, but he himself remained behind. Darge was not punished by Tewodros for helping Menelik escape, and this was attributed to the deep affection Tewodros II had for Darge. He was released from captivity in 1868 by the British.

=== Return to Shewa ===
Darge was created a Ras and made Ras of Selale by his nephew upon his return to Shewa following his release from Magdala when Tewodros II died, founding the senior cadet branch of the dynasty in the later days of the Ethiopian Empire. In 1886, then Emperor Menelik assigned him the governorship of Arsi Province, and completed the conquest that his nephew had begun the year before. The conquest was infamous for its slaughter of the Arsi Oromo who lived there, leading Baxter to describe him as "the Butcher Cumberland of the Arussi Highlands... whose name is still reviled there."

Darge became Menelik's senior advisor, always advising him to be prudent and patient in his dealings with the powers that be. Although Menelik claimed to be the next legitimate claimant to the Imperial throne, Darge brokered Menelik's acceptance of Wagshum Gobeze's assumption of the throne as Tekle Giyorgis II and the marriage of his own daughter Tisseme to the new Emperor's half-brother Haile Wolde Kiros. When Tekle Giyorgis II was deposed by Emperor Yohannes IV, again it was Darge who counseled Menelik to be patient and submit. As a result, Darge was universally respected by all the various feudal princelings and claimants in Ethiopia, and was held in very high regard by Emperor Yohannes in particular.

Considered the senior prince of the blood during the reign of his nephew as Emperor Menelik II, he was the only person in a position to scold the Emperor as a father would. He often acted as regent in the absence of Emperor Menelik. He was acting in the capacity when the Emperor was marching north to face the Italians at Adowa, when he received the stunning news that the Italians had brought his son Lij Gugsa Darge from his school in Switzerland with the intention of placing him on the imperial throne after they defeated Menelik. Ras Darge was enraged, and not only disowned his son but had his name struck from the Imperial family genealogy.

=== Death ===
Darge died of illness in March 1900 and was buried with pomp and ceremony at Debre Libanos.

== Descendants ==
He was the father of Dejazmach Desta Darge, Woizero Tisseme Darge, Fitawrari Shewareged Darge, Dejazmach Tessema Darge, Woizero Tsehaywork Darge, Woizero Askale Darge, Dejazmach Asfaw Darge, Lij Gugsa Darge and Lij Belw Darge The succession to Selale eventually passed on to his grandson Ras Kassa Haile Darge, son of Woizero Tisseme Darge.

Darge was the uncle of Emperor Menelik II of Ethiopia, Ras Makonnen Woldemikael governor of Harar, Ras Welde Giyorgis of Gondar, Fitawrari Takla Mariyam Haile Mikael, Dejazmach Mashasha Sayfu and several other notables.
