= Haile Melekot =

Ethiopian noble; King of Shewa from 1847 to 1855

Haile Melekot ኃይለ መለኮት ሣህለ ሥላሴ
- Merid Azmach
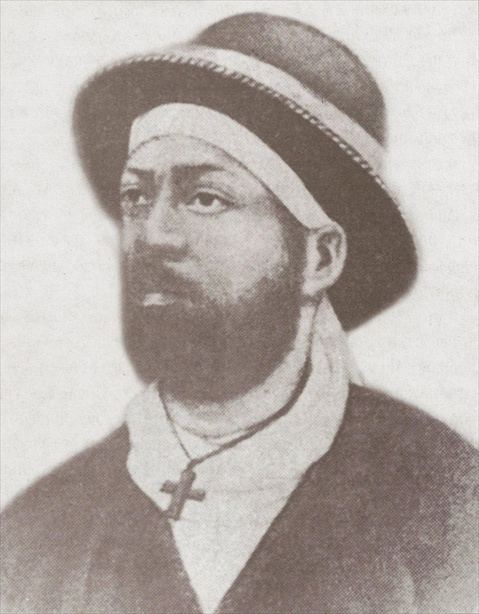

Negus of Shewa
- Reign: 12 October 1847 – 9 November 1855
- Predecessor: Sahle Selassie
- Successor: Menelik II
- Born: 1824; Ethiopian Empire
- Died: 22 October 1855 (aged 30–31); Atakelt, Ethiopian Empire
- Issue: Menelik II
- Father: Sahle Selassie
- Mother: Woizero Bezabish Wolde
- Religion: Ethiopian Orthodox Tewahedo

Hailemelekot Sahle Selassie (Amharic: ኃይለ መለኮት ሣህለ ሥላሴ, 1824 – 9 November 1855) was Negus of Shewa, a historical region of Ethiopia, from 12 October 1847 until his death. He was the oldest son of Negus Sahle Selassie an important Amhara nobleman and his wife Woizero Bezabish Wolde.

== Lineage and early life ==
Of Amhara royal descent. Haile melekot is the oldest son (Note: Garmame is according to one version of history a natural son of Sahle Selassie born almost two decades earlier than Hailemelekot, though there are other versions of history which put this in doubt.) of the King of Shewa Sahle Selassie and Woizero Bezabish Wolde. Hailemelekot had 5 full siblings, 4 sisters and one brother Sayfu Sahle Selassie who is three or four years younger. He had numerous half-siblings as his father had other children by his numerous concubines, among them his half-brothers Haile Mikael Sahle Selassie and Darge Sahle Selassie.

During William Cornwallis Harris diplomatic mission to Sahle Selassie's court, both Hailemelekot and Sayfu stayed at different monasteries, pursuing a traditional church education. Each was attended by a eunuch, a nurse, and guardians, whose task was to supervise and discipline. In addition to their academic studies, the boys were trained in horsemanship and the various arts of war. They followed a rigorous timetable, studying, practising with shield and spear, attending church service, fasting, and praying.

== Descendants ==
Hailemelekot's first wife the name Ejigayehu whom he married in 1844 in order to legitimize their one child, baptised Sahle Mariam, was renamed Menelik by Negus Sahle Selassie. Her background is disputed; some believe she was of Gurage origin, while others believe she was of Oromo descent due to the etymological roots of her forefathers’ names. He divorced Ejigayehu in less than a year, and in May 1845 he married his second wife, Woizero Tideneqialesh, who was a former wife of a court official.

== Rise to power ==
Hailemelekot was known as Lij Besha Warad before he became king of Shewa in 1847. It was well known that Sahle Selassie favored his younger son, Sayfu Sahle Selassie, and it was widely rumored that he would make his younger son his heir. However, Sahle Selassie publicly announced that his oldest son Hailemelekot would inherit the kingdom, had Sayfu swear to abide by this decision, and although mortally ill shortly before his death travelled to Debre Berhan where he asked his vassal lords to remain loyal to Hailemelekot.

Nonetheless, in Mordechai Abir's words, Sahle Selassie's death "was a signal for a blood bath which surpassed anything that ever occurred in the annals of Showa." The Abichu Oromo rose in open revolt, attempting to recover control of the district of Tegulet and came close to capturing the capital of Ankober. Only the loyalty of some of the other Oromo chiefs and the Shewan supply of firearms saved the capital. Hailemelekot afterwards managed to persuade the meet with him at Angolalla, where he persuaded them to end their revolt. By the beginning of 1848, he was firmly in control of his kingdom, and even organized a campaign against the Arsi Oromo, who had been raiding the south-western parts of Shewa for years.

== Reign ==
Harold G. Marcus notes that "little is known or remembered of the reign of Sahle Selassie's son, except for its end." While he is likely correct in stating that this lack of information "leads one to believe that his reign was undistinguished", one brief letter of Hailemelekot survives, undated but written in the spring of 1849 and addressed to "Victoria, Queen of the Ferangi" – i.e. the Europeans. According to Sven Rubenson, it was delivered by an Ethiopian pilgrim to the British consul at Cairo, who was on his way to Jerusalem; the pilgrim also informed the consul that a gift consisting of 26 elephant tusks and 31 rhinoceros horns were en route to the British at Aden. Although it was agreed that the pilgrim would stop on his return travel to pick up the British response, he was never seen again.

In this letter, Hailemelekot refers to the friendship between the United Kingdom and Shewa, asks why they did not send a servant on his father's death to bring condolences and for 1,500 Thalers, with a verbal message by the courier asking for skilled workmen. Misunderstanding the intent of this letter (and not for the last time the British government misunderstood Ethiopian customs), Lord Palmerston responded on 4 July 1849 that Shewa lay too far away to send any workmen "and, moreover, the workmen in her dominions are at present much employed." With this letter a chest containing 300 sovereigns was sent; this gift was returned with a second letter containing the accusation that the coins were not made of gold but brass, and concluding, "Even if our friendship is gone, let there not be enmity between us."

Rubenson interprets this communication as evidence of Shewan "aloofness and suspicion" of European attention. He notes that the letter was sent not under the royal name of Hailemelekot, but as "Basad Wirad", the name he used before his coronation, and was most familiar to the Europeans visiting Shewa in his father's time knew him. The ruler, or at least his secretary, was unclear which country Victoria was queen over. As for the return of the coins, Rubenson believes "it is more likely that the King was prevented from accepting the gift by the same anti-European forces that had compelled Krapf and Harris to give up Shewa. Whatever the reason, the incident shows how difficult it was to create confidence and establish anything resembling ordinary diplomatic relations."

Inevitably, Hailemelekot's semi-independent kingdom (the Emperor of Ethiopia in Gondar was still nominally the liege lord of the King of Shewa) came to the attention of Tewodros II, a regional lord of Gondar, who successfully concluding the process of defeating the remaining local rulers (princes) of Ethiopia and reuniting Ethiopia. Hailemelekot allied himself with the Oromo in the province Wollo, which lay between him and Tewodros, but as Abir notes, he "was not made of the same stuff his father was, and could not provide the same inspiring leadership which had made Showa strong in the past." The Shewan army failed to provide any effective help to the Oromo leaders in Wollo, and with an army of 50,000 men, Tewodros crushed his divided opposition. After a pause for the rainy season, Tewodros then entered northern Shewa in 1855.

By this point Hailemelekot was discouraged and gravely sick. His brother Seyfe, dissatisfied with his indecision, led the army south from Wollo to Menz then to Tegulet, abandoning Hailemelekot. The local governors were no match for the Emperor, and either were defeated or (like the governor of Efrata) went over to Tewodros' side. Rebellious Oromo burned Angolalla. The Negus of Shewa was horrified to learn that his mother Bezabish and his grandmother Zenebework (respectively widow and mother of the late Sahle Selassie) had crossed to the camp of Tewodros II and paid him homage in exchange for a guarantee that their personal lands would not be touched. A despondent Hailemelekot made a few skirmishes against Tewodros' forces, then destroyed his food stores and his capital of Debre Berhan to keep it out of Tewodros' hands. He died of his illness in the town of Atakelt, and was hastily buried at Debre Gage in Tara.

A handful of Shewan nobles fought on, until a final battle in Bulga, where they were defeated by a detachment of Tewodros' troops under Ras Ingida. Accepting that further resistance was not possible, they delivered Menelik, the son and heir of Hailemelekot, to Tewodros. Emperor Tewodros appointed Hailemelekot's brother Haile Mikael governor, and the independence of Shewa came to an end.

== Aftermath ==
In an interesting postscript, Tewodros II is said to have disbelieved that Hailemelekot was really dead and demanded that his body be disinterred. When he saw the body of the dead king, the Emperor is said to have wept for him, saying it was a shame that illness should deny a brave man such as the King of Shewa, the honor of falling in battle. He ordered that Hailemelekot be re-buried with all the pomp and ceremony due to a king.

== See also ==
- List of rulers of Shewa

== Notes ==
Preceded by Sahle Selassie	Rulers of Shewa	Succeeded by Sahle Mariam
