= Tsadkane Mariam Monastery =

Monastery in Sela Dingay, Amhara Region, Ethiopia

- ፃድቃኔ ማርያም ገዳም
- Interactive map of Tsadkane Mariam Monastery

Monastery information
- Full name: Debre Metmik Tsadkane Mariam Monastery
- Denomination: Ethiopian Orthodox Tewahedo Church
- Established: 15th century
- Dedication: Saint Mary
- Celebration: 15 August (Feast of the Assumption of the Virgin Mary)

People
- Founder: Abbot Tsadkan

Site
- Location: Sela Dingay, North Shewa Zone, Amhara Region
- Country: Ethiopia
- Coordinates: 9°56′52″N 39°38′24″E
- Public access: Yes

Debre Metmik Tsadkane Mariam Monastery (Amharic: ደብረ መጥምቅ ፃድቃኔ ማርያም ገዳም), also simply known as Tsadkane Mariam Monastery, is an Ethiopian Orthodox Tewahedo Church monastery located in mountainous region in Sela Dingay, in North Shewa Zone of Amhara Region, around 200 km (120 mi) northeast of Addis Ababa.

The church has unique architecture of chambers, rooms and walls and most pilgrimages are frequented to this monastery.

== Location ==
Tsadkane Mariam Monastery is located in Sela Dingay, North Shewa Zone of Amhara Region, around 200 km (120 mi) northeast of Addis Ababa. It is located in the south-east of Sela Dengay.

== Worthington Planning Commission ==
In March 2022, the Worthington Planning Commission approved a recommendation from the church to operate in The Global Office Building at 300 11th Street in conditional use permit. In 2018, the group denied a conditional use permit to build on property located across from Oslon Park. Instead, the church purchased five acres (2.0 ha) of land in the city of Worthington located along Nobles County 57, near Lakeside Travel Plaza. However, the church was unable to build on the property due to shortage of funds and change in their membership.
