= Territorial Army (Ethiopia) =

National ground force of Ethiopian Empire

- Country: Ethiopia
- Allegiance: Ethiopian Empire
- Branch: Army of the Ethiopian Empire (Ethiopian National Defense Force)
- Type: National ground force
- Role: Auxiliary police

The Territorial Army (Amharic: የግዛት ጦር) was the national ground force of the Ethiopian Empire organized by Haile Selassie after World War II. It operated essentially as a loosely organized auxiliary force serving to aid in local police work. It was dominated by a group of officers known as "The Exiles" for their role in following the emperor out of the country in 1936 after the Second Italo-Ethiopian War.

== History ==
It was formed as part of Haile Selassie's transformation strategy, with the mission being to disarm the guerrillas that took part in the Ethiopian Civil War. Emperor Selassie authorized the recruitment of many shifta in the Territorial Army during its existence. Over time, it was gradually incorporated into the regular army. In late June 1974, officers of the Territorial Army formed the Derg.

== Role ==
The Territorial Army's provincial units, commanded by the governor general, assisted the national police force in areas where police were scarce. It also guarded magazines, communication lines and other important places.

== See also ==
- Ethiopian National Defense Force
- Law enforcement in Ethiopia
