= List of rulers of Shewa =

Ruler of Shewa
- Provincial
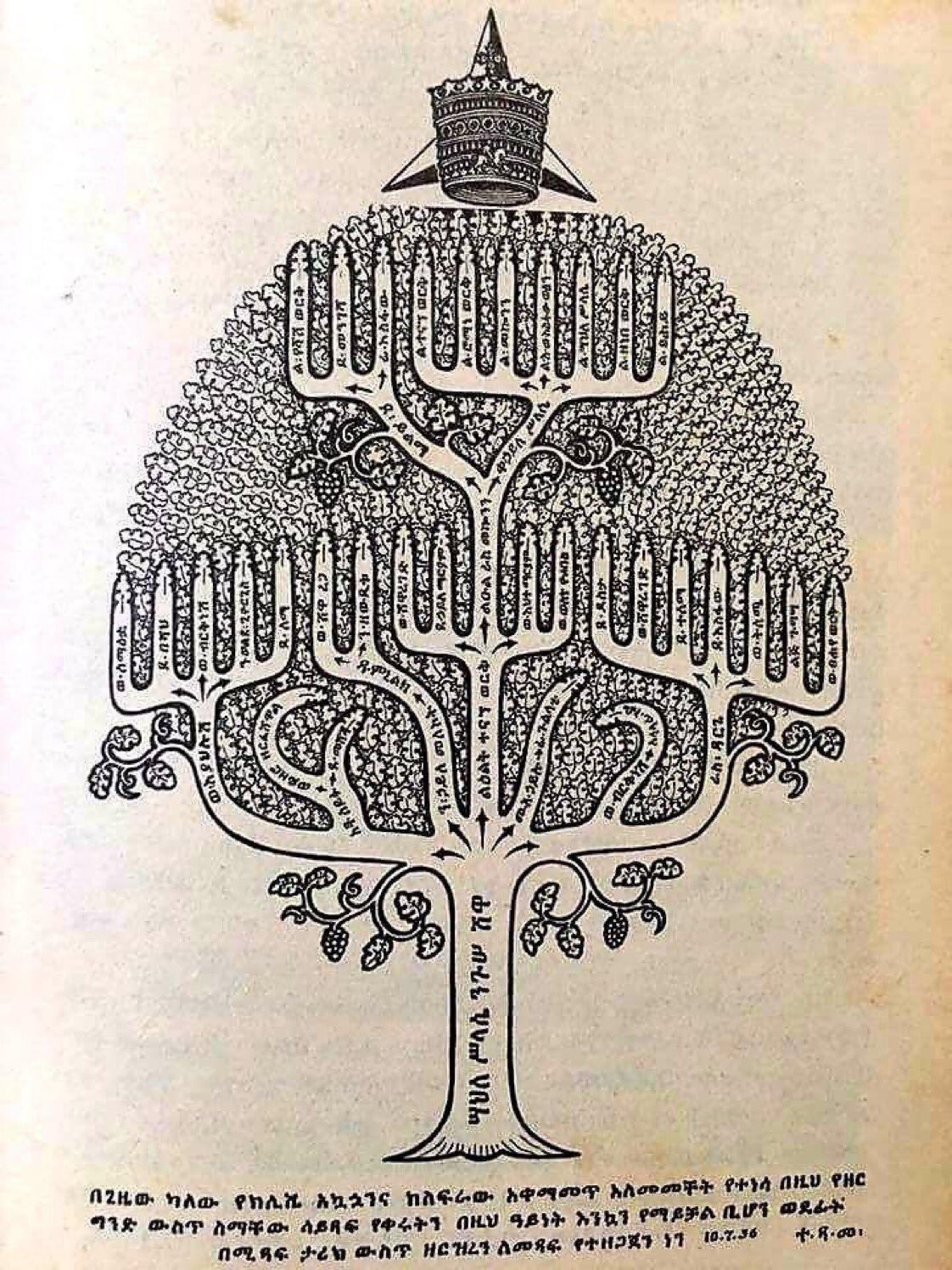
- Family tree of the Shewan rulers

Details
- Style: His Majesty
- First monarch: Abeto Nagasi Krestos
- Last monarch: Sahle Mariam
- Formed: c. 1682
- Abolished: 10 March 1889
- Residences: Ankober; Debre Birhan; Qundi (1808–1813); Doqaqit (1745–1805); Yifat
- Appointer: Hereditary

Location of Shewa province (red) within the Ethiopian Empire.

This article lists the rulers of Shewa, a historical region of Ethiopia.

== c. 960–1270 ==
According to tradition, the Solomonic dynasty (1270–1974) was descended from king Solomon and queen Makeda via the kings of Axum. Long before the fall of Aksum, pre-existing Christian communities had already established deep roots in Shewa, creating cultural and religious bridge with Aksum. After Axum was destroyed by Gudit in the 10th century, the surviving royal family led by son of Dil Na'od and his people, fled to Shewa and reigned there for 330 years before the accession of Yekuno Amlak. A line of kings ruled at Shewa during the time of the Zagwe dynasty and claimed descent from Dil Na'od, the last king of Axum. The 1922 regnal list of Ethiopia includes eight unnumbered kings described as "8 generations of an Israelitish dynasty" who "did not mount the throne". These kings did not mount the throne in Aksum, although they went on to form the Kingdom of Shewa.

During Aksumite era, Shewa was an important remote frontier. The historical region of Shewa served as the primary strategic sanctuary for the Aksumite royal line during one of the most tumultuous periods in Ethiopian history. According to Kebra Negest and local histories, the Israelitish (Solomonic) dynasty sought refuge in the central highlands following the collapse of the Aksumite Empire around 960 CE. When Queen Gudit (Yodit) led a campaign that destabilized the northern power centers, the Aksumite royal family fled south to Shewa. This migration was possible because a Christian polity had already been established in the region during the Aksumite era, serving as a cultural and religious extension of the northern empire. Washa Michael Rock-Hewn church is one of the testimonies for this.

Washa Michael Rock-Hewn Church is an ancient, semi-monolithic church located in the Yeka district of Addis Ababa. Carved entirely out of a single volcanic rock slab, the historic site dates back to 320 AD. It was built by the Aksumite brother kings, Ezana and Sayzana (later named Abreha and Atsebeha).

For approximately 330 years, these royals maintained a "kingdom in exile" in Shewa rugged highlands, preserving their lineage and administrative traditions while the Zagwe dynasty ruled from Lasta. This period of endurance concluded in 1270, when Yekuno Amlak, basing his uprising in the Shewan enclave, successfully overthrew the last Zagwe monarch to restore the Solomonic Empire.

The name "Shewa" itself is deeply entwined with this narrative of preservation. In Amharic, the term is derived from a root meaning "rescue" or "to save," commemorating the province's historical role as a safe haven for the imperial lineage.

Portrait	Ruler	Reign	Notes
	Mahbara Wedem	c. 960	
	Agbea Tseyon		
	Tsenfa Arad		
	Nagash Zare		
	Asfeh		
	Yakob		
	Bahr Asagad		
	Asgud		Additional name found on one regnal list quoted by Egyptologist Henry Salt.
	Edem Asagad	c. 1210–1255	
	Yekuno Amlak	c. 1255–1270	Defeated the last Zagwe king and became Emperor of Ethiopia (r. 1270–1285).

Parallel to the highland Christian kingdom, the Makhzumi Dynasty established a Muslim sultanate that operated primarily as a commercial power. The 13th-century Makhzumi Chronicles and historical records place their administrative capital at Walale in northern Hararghe, deep inside Harla country. The modern Harari ethnic group is widely considered a direct product of the mixing between the native Harla people and the Argobba-Makhzumi factions. The Makhuzmi did not govern the central highland core of Shewa; rather, they controlled the vital Zeila trade routes that ran along the outskirts and eastern frontiers of the region. Their influence was concentrated in the lowlands and the eastern Rift Valley, where they managed the movement of goods between the African interior and the coast. Their archeological footprint and political center remained firmly in the east until they were deposed by the Walashma dynasty of Ifat in 1285. When the Walashma dynasty of Ifat overthrew the Makhzumi kings in 1285 AD, the geopolitical center of the sultanate was pushed further west.

== 1682–1889 ==
Claiming Solomonic descent, Nagasi Krestos established Shewa as an autonomous region of the weakening Ethiopian Empire in the 17th century before requesting the title of Meridazmatch, which would be adopted by his successors, and beginning a southern expansion of his realm that would culminate in the conquests of his descendant Menelik II.

Portrait	Ruler	Reign	Notes
	Nagasi Krestos	c. 1682 – c. 1703	Abeto
	Sebestyanos	c. 1703 – c. 1718	Merid Azmach
	Kidane Kale (Abuye)	c. 1718 – c. 1744	Merid Azmach
	Amha Iyasus (Amhayes)	c. 1744 – c. 1775	Merid Azmach
	Asfaw Wossen	c. 1775 – c. 1808	Merid Azmach
	Wossen Seged	c. 1808 – June 1813	Merid Azmach and Ras
	Sahle Selassie	12 June 1813 – 22 October 1847	Merid Azmach, after 1839 Negus
	Haile Melekot	22 October 1847 – 9 November 1855	Negus
	Sahle Mariam	9 November 1855 – 1856	First reign as Negus
	Haile Mikael	1856 to 1859	Son of Sahle Selassie, appointed Meridazmach by Emperor Tewodros II
	Bezabeh	1859	First reign, appointed by Emperor Tewodros II
	Seyfe	1859 – 1860	Son of Sahle Selassie, self-appointed Merid Azmach against Emperor Tewodros II
	Bezabeh	1860 – 1865	Second reign, restored by Emperor Tewodros II
	Sahle Mariam	August 1865 – 10 March 1889	Second reign as Negus, became Emperor Menelik II

== See also ==
- Zemene Mesafint
