= Bezabish =

Ethiopian royal

Woizero Bezabish Wolde
- Spouse: Sahle Selassie
- Children: Haile Melekot
- Relatives: Menelik II (grandchild)

Woizero Bezabish Wolde (died 1870s) was the wife of Sahle Selassie, Negus of Shewa, mother of King Haile Melekot of Shewa, and grandmother of Emperor Menelik II. She held the districts of Bulga and Yifat as her personal fiefs. Bezabish would become infamous for betraying her son Haile Melekot by submitting to his opponent Emperor Tewodros II during the latter's forcible re-incorporation of Shewa under the direct rule of the Imperial throne in 1855.
