= Wossen Seged =

Ethiopian prince of the early 19th century

Wossen Seged (ruled c. 1808 – June 1813) was a Merid Azmach of Shewa, an Amhara noble of Ethiopia. He was the elder son of Asfa Wossen, by a woman of the Solomonic dynasty. He was the first ruler of Shewa to claim a higher title than Merid Azmach, calling himself Ras.

== History ==
During the reign of Wossen Seged, the chronology of Shewa becomes stable. One mention that helps date the Meridazmach's reign is that of Henry Salt, who mentions him as ruling Ifat (the contemporary name of Shewa, and, later, the name of a region in Shewa. From "Ifat") during his visit to Ethiopia in 1809–1810.

During Wossen Seged's reign, the following districts were under his rule:

- Moret
- Gedem
- Marra Biete
- Bulga
- Mugher
- Abichu
- Debre Libanos

As Asfa Wossen had sons by a second wife, who came from the aristocracy in Menz, Wossen Seged feared that he would be passed over in favor of his younger half-brother and he rebelled against his father. Failing to attract support, Wossen Seged was defeated and imprisoned; but the aging Asfa Wossen was reconciled to Wossen Seged, and made him not only governor of Antziokia in northern Shewa but his successor.

Abir mentions a tradition that during a battle against the Yejju Oromo he was captured by chief Guji, the grandson of Gwangul, but ransomed by the head of the Shewan church, who had disguised himself as a Muslim sheikh to enter the territory of Yejju undetected. After he assumed control of Shewa, he joined in an alliance with Ras Wolde Selassie of Tigray to invade the territories of Ras Gugsa of Yejju.

Wossen Seged began a campaign of church-building, restoring the Church of the Trinity in Debre Berhan, and Church of the Virgin in Debre Libanos, as well as building a new church in Sela Dingay. Despite these works, the local Ethiopian church were dissatisfied with him due to his policy of religious toleration towards his Muslim subjects.

== Death ==
Henze believes they were behind his murder at the hand of one of his slaves in his palace at Qundi, north of Ankober. According to Pearce, the slave had set on fire the thatched house Wossen Seged and his wife was sleeping in. Although the Meridazmach managed to escape the burning house, as well as saving the life of his queen, the slave then fatally stabbed Wossen Seged in the ribs. Wossen Seged survived the attack for a few days, naming his son Sahle Selassie as his successor.

== Notes ==
Preceded by Asfa Wossen	Rulers of Shewa	Succeeded by Sahle Selassie
