= William Cornwallis Harris =

English military engineer and artist (1807–1848)

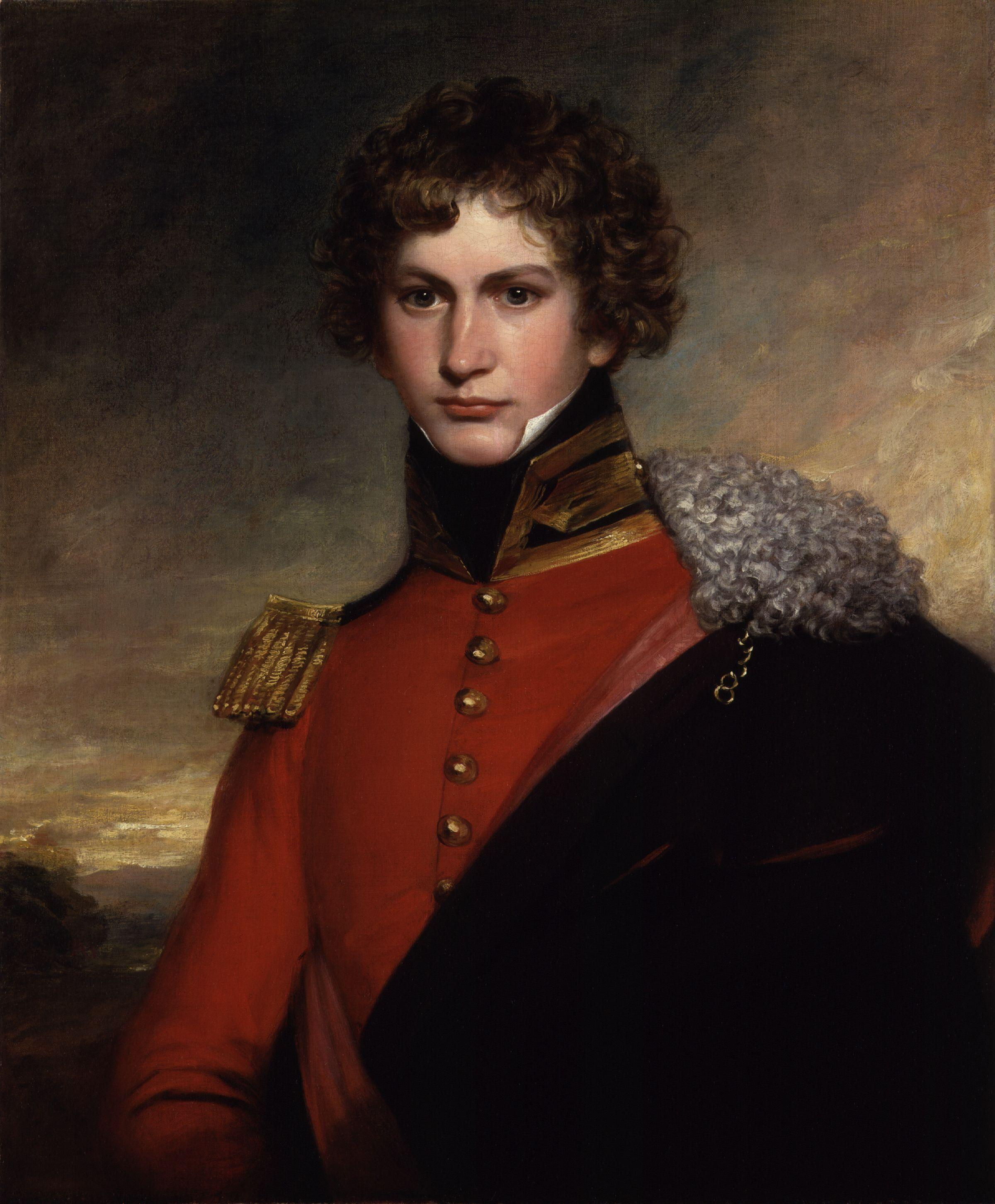
William Cornwallis Harris by Ramsay Richard Reinagle, National Portrait Gallery, London

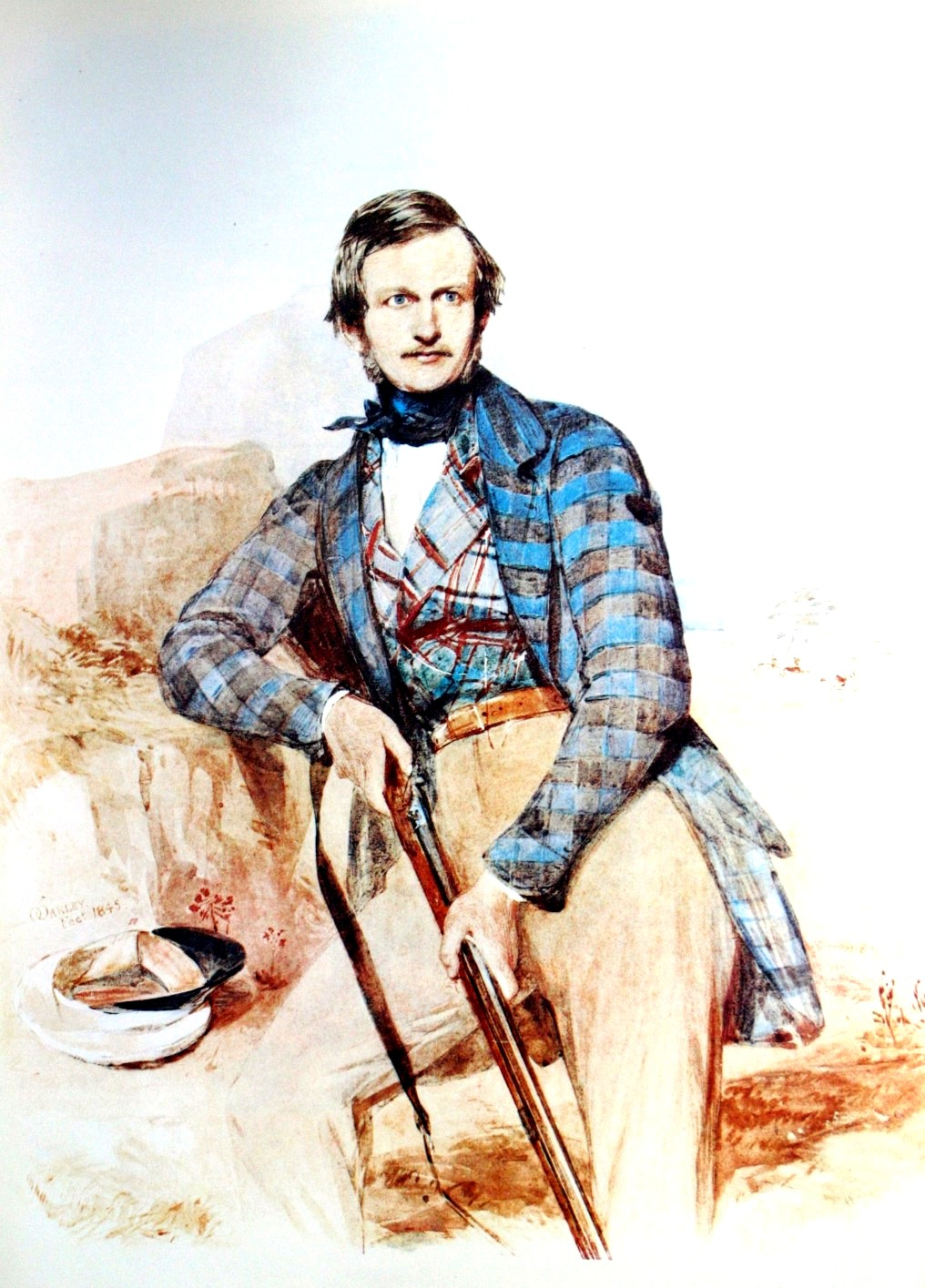
William Cornwallis Harris

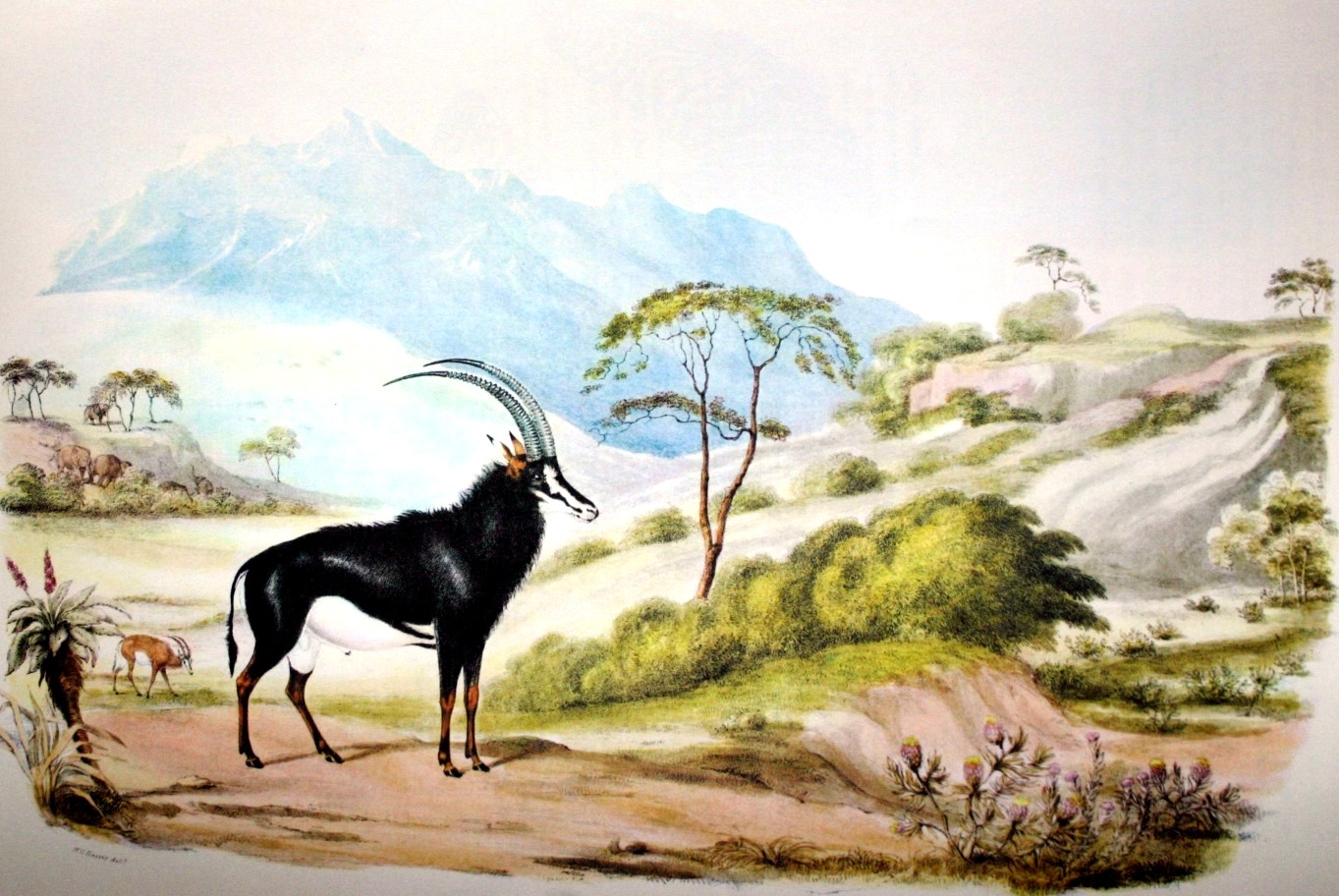
Sable antelope

Major Sir William Cornwallis Harris (baptised 2 April 1807 – died 9 October 1848) was an English military engineer, artist and hunter.

== Life and career ==
=== Early life ===
The son of James Harris of Wittersham, Kent, he entered Addiscombe Military Seminary at the age of fourteen. Two years later, in December 1823, he joined the army of the East India Company as second lieutenant in Engineers, Bombay Establishment. Over the following thirteen years, he was posted to several places in India and was able to pursue his taste for field sports and the depiction of wildlife. He was promoted to first lieutenant in 1824 and to captain ten years later.

=== South Africa ===
In June 1836, Harris arrived at Cape Town on the 1,467-ton Buckinghamshire and stayed for two years in order to recover from a fever. He was fortunate to meet Dr. Andrew Smith, freshly returned from a journey north on which he had visited Mzilikazi at Mosega. From the Cape, he arranged a hunting trip, which was to last from 1836 to 1837, to the Western Transvaal and Magaliesberg with William Richardson of the Bombay Civil Service, who had been a fellow passenger on the voyage.

They sailed to Algoa Bay and made their way to Grahamstown, where they outfitted their expedition and received helpful advice from the ivory traders David Hume and Robert Schoon. Their route took them across the Orange River to Kuruman, where they met Robert Moffat, who had befriended Mzilikazi and was able to provide Harris with useful information about the ruler. Mzilikazi received Harris' presents with pleasure and the expedition set off confidently for the Magaliesberg toward the south-east.

Here they experienced at first hand the struggles of the Voortrekkers against the Matabele. Harris came across his first sable antelope (Hippotragus niger) in the Magaliesberg, and sent a description and specimen of the animal to the Zoological Society of London. David Hume had years earlier decided that it was possible to cross the Kalahari and reach Lake Ngami. Harris was of like mind and made known his willingness to go, but the geographical societies of Bombay and London ignored him.

Harris was one of the more notable of the early Victorian travellers, and his illustrations of the large African fauna were the first to have any claim to accuracy. He hunted on a ruthless scale, even as he wrote with passion about the regions he crossed, and painted the animals he encountered with great attention to detail. He was not an outstanding artist, but his paintings and sketches have great charm and spirit and have considerably enriched natural history art.

=== Return to India ===
He remained at Cape Town to the end of 1837, then for the next three years he resumed his work in Western India as field engineer to the Sindh Force.

=== Mission to Ethiopia ===
From 1841 to 1843, Harris led a British diplomatic mission from Bombay to Sahle Selassie, Negus of Shewa, at the time an autonomous district of Ethiopia, with whom they negotiated a commercial treaty. They also collected extensive scientific data during the trip.

Harris managed to capture the political atmosphere and attitudes of Sahle's court towards his enemies, in a song of praise played by one of his female chorist (Azmari).

In stature like the lance he bears,
His godlike mien the prince declares;
And famed for virtue through the land,
All bow to Saloo's just command.

The sabre feels the royal grasp,
And Pagans writhe in death's cold clasp;
The Galla taste the captive fare,
And dread the vengeance which they dare.

— A memorable observation by Major William Cornwallis Harris, of a female Azmari praise of king Sahle Selassie court, in "Misgana (translated from Amharic) praise song",

=== Last years ===
Harris was gazetted major in 1843 and was knighted in England the following year for his services. After being knighted, Harris acted as executive engineer at Dharwar Dion and Poona. He died near Poona as a result of fever, aged 41.

=== Personal life ===
Harris married Margaret Sligo, daughter of George Sligo of Auldhame in Scotland and niece of General Sir James Outram. Their marriage was childless.

== Books ==
- Narrative of an Expedition into Southern Africa during the years 1836 and 1837. (1838)
- The Wild sports of Southern Africa (1839).
- Portraits of the Game and Wild Animals of Southern Africa (1840).
- The Highlands of Aethiopia (1844; in 3 volumes).
- Illustrations of the Highlands of Aethiopia [1845].

== See also ==
- List of famous big game hunters

== Sources ==
- Standard Encyclopaedia of Southern Africa. Vol. 5. Cape Town: Nasou. 1972. ISBN 0-625-00321-7.
- Ethiopian Encounters: Sir William Cornwallis Harris and the British Mission to the Kingdom of Shewa (1841-3) (Exhibition catalogue). Cambridge: Fitzwilliam Museum. 2007.
