= Tulama =

Oromo subgroup of central Ethiopia

Tulama Oromo are an Oromo subgroup inhabiting the Shewa Zones of Oromia, Ethiopia, East Shewa Zone, North Shewa Zone (Oromia), South West Shewa Zone, Oromia Special Zone Surrounding Addis Ababa).

== See also ==
- List of Oromo subgroups and clans
