= Ankober =

Town in Amhara Region, Ethiopia

Ankober አንኮበር
- Town
- Location within Ethiopia
- Coordinates: 9°36′N 39°44′E
- Country: Ethiopia
- Region: Amhara
- Zone: North Shewa
- Woreda: Ankober
- Elevation: 2,465 m (8,087 ft)

Population (2005)
  - Total: 2,288
- Time zone: UTC+3 (EAT)

Ankober (Amharic: አንኮበር), formerly known as Ankobar, is a town in central Ethiopia. Located in the North Shewa Zone of the Amhara Region, it's perched on the eastern escarpment of the Ethiopian Highlands at an elevation of about 2,465 meters (8,100 ft). It is 40 kilometers (25 mi) to the east of Debre Birhan and about 90 miles (140 km) northeast of Addis Ababa.

Ankober was formerly the capital of the Ethiopian kingdom of Shewa founded by Yekuno Amlak in the thirteenth century. Buildings that survive from the Shewa period include the Kidus Mikael Church, built by Sahle Selassie. According to Philip Briggs, all that survives of Menelik's palace, which he had built on the site of his father's palace, is "one long stone-and-mortar wall measuring some 1.5m high." Briggs comments that it is "difficult to say why this one wall should have survived virtually intact when the rest of the palace crumbled into virtual oblivion." Ankober is also known as where the endemic Ankober serin was first observed by ornithologists in 1979.

== History ==
Ankober may have formerly been known as Gorobela.

Meridazmach Amha Iyasus, moved the capital of Shewa from Doqaqit (located near Debre Sina) to Ankober. It remained the principal residence of the rulers of Shewa until Negus (later Emperor) Menelik II moved it to Mount Entoto in 1878, although Wossen Seged preferred to live at Qundi during his reign. The name of the town is said to have been taken from an Oromo Queen, Anko, who ruled the town during the reign of Qedami Qal.

The first Europeans to record their visit to Ankober were the Evangelical missionaries Carl Wilhelm Isenberg and Johann Ludwig Krapf in 1839. However, at the time there was a small colony of Greeks, who made their living as craftsmen and tradesmen. In the following years, a steady stream of travellers visited Ankober, including Captain William Cornwallis Harris. Following the death of Meridazmach Sahle Selassie in 1847, the Abichu Oromo rebelled and attacked Ankober; only the firearms Sahle Selassie had collected there saved the capital. The Shewans burned the town in 1856 in reaction to the invasion, and eventual conquest, of Emperor Tewodros II.

It was soon rebuilt, and used by Tewodros's appointees Haile Mikael and Seyfe Sahle Selassie as their seat of power. At that time, its population was around 5000, rising to 15,000 during the residency of the imperial court. The stone palace crowned the top of the hill, surrounded with a simple fortification of stakes and branches, while most of the people lived in conical thatched huts scattered across the face of the mountain. The Ankober market in the mid-19th century was held on Saturday, the day after the more important market at Aliyu Amba. The Ankober market was frequented mostly by the local Christians. During the later 19th century, Wehni Azaj Welde Sadeq (1838–1909) was governor of Ankober and chief of the local prison, having jurisdiction over the Afar lowlands until his death.

Around 1890, Menelek II began using Ankober to confine his political prisoners. People held there included Gaki Sherocho, the last king of Kaffa, and Ras Mengesha Yohannes, the rebellious son of Emperor Yohannes IV. During Menelik II's absence as he went to confront the Italians at the Battle of Adwa, the rebel leader Talha Jafar pillaged the town, resulting in significant destruction.

Around the time of the First World War, the population was around 2000. In the military actions leading to the Battle of Segale, on 18 October 1916 Negus Mikael's troops crushed an advance force of 11,000 men stationed in Ankober and killed their leader, Ras Lul Seged.

During the Italian occupation, the town consisted of about 3,000 inhabitants living on two hilltops of different height. The Italian Resident lived on the higher hill, and on the lower hill were the two round churches Maryam and Medhane Alem. Around this time the Italians partly moved Ankober to a more accessible plateau. The Italians also carried out a number of bombings against the Arbegnoch in the neighboring area.

== Demographics ==
Based on figures from the Central Statistical Agency of Ethiopia published in 2005, Ankober has an estimated population of 1114 males and 1174 females for a total population of 2288. Despite its status as a former capital, Ankober is only the second-largest town in Ankober woreda.

== Transportation ==
The 42-kilometer gravel road between Ankober and Debre Berhan was overhauled in May 2009.

== Climate ==
Climate data for Ankober, Amhara (1999–2019)
Month	Jan	Feb	Mar	Apr	May	Jun	Jul	Aug	Sep	Oct	Nov	Dec	Year
Mean daily maximum °C (°F)	18.2 (64.8)	19.5 (67.1)	19.9 (67.8)	20.1 (68.2)	20.9 (69.6)	21.6 (70.9)	19.8 (67.6)	19.1 (66.4)	19.0 (66.2)	18.7 (65.7)	18.4 (65.1)	17.8 (64.0)	19.4 (67.0)
Daily mean °C (°F)	13.0 (55.4)	14.2 (57.6)	15.0 (59.0)	15.5 (59.9)	16.5 (61.7)	16.8 (62.2)	15.2 (59.4)	14.7 (58.5)	14.9 (58.8)	14.2 (57.6)	13.4 (56.1)	12.7 (54.9)	14.7 (58.4)
Mean daily minimum °C (°F)	8.8 (47.8)	9.8 (49.6)	10.9 (51.6)	11.5 (52.7)	12.1 (53.8)	11.8 (53.2)	11.4 (52.5)	11.1 (52.0)	11.0 (51.8)	10.2 (50.4)	9.1 (48.4)	8.6 (47.5)	10.5 (50.9)
Average precipitation mm (inches)	46.0 (1.81)	51.0 (2.01)	100.0 (3.94)	113.0 (4.45)	41.0 (1.61)	54.0 (2.13)	294.0 (11.57)	327.0 (12.87)	97.0 (3.82)	23.0 (0.91)	16.0 (0.63)	15.0 (0.59)	1,177 (46.34)
Average relative humidity (%)	59	50	53	58	50	47	70	76	65	52	50	54	57
Source: Climate-Data.org
