= Negus =

Royal title of Ethiopia and Eritrea, equivalent to "king"

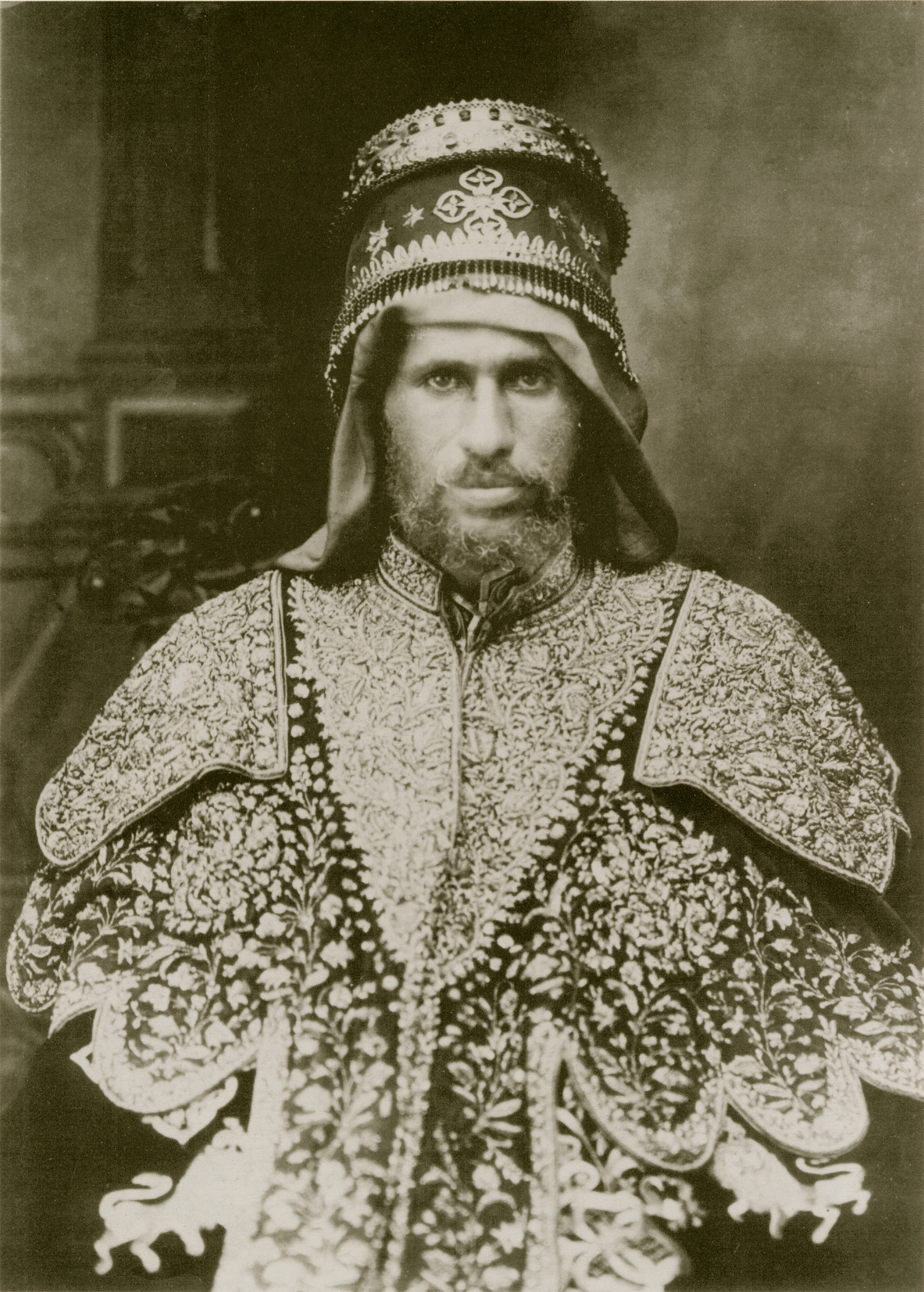
Tekle Haymanot, Negus of Gojjam

Negus (Note: English pronunciation: /ˈniːɡəs/ or /nɪˈɡuːs/; Ge'ez: ንጉሥ, romanized: nəguś [nɨguɬ]; cf. Amharic: ንጉሥ, romanized: nəgus [nɨgus]) is the word for "king" in the Ethiopian Semitic languages and a title which was usually bestowed upon a regional ruler by the Negusa Nagast, or "King of Kings," in pre-1974 Ethiopia. The Negus is referred to as Al-Najashi (النجاشي) in the Islamic tradition.

== Etymology ==
Sometime during the development of the Ethio-Semitic language family "m-l-k," the original triconsonantal root for king, was elevated to the generic word for "god" in the form of the broken plural "ʾämlak, ʔamlāk," as well as the word for angelic or divine when conjugated as melekot. It is possible the word related to Hebrew El (Elohim) or Allah (Ilah) was lost due to a word taboo much like YHWH. During this time the ancient Semitic term for a ruler or lord, n-g-s (from Proto-Semitic √ngɬ 'to push, press for work'), began to mean "king." Along with that term, in the early Ethiopian state of D'mt the South Semitic term Mukarrib (priest-king), mostly associated with the Kingdom of Sheba, was in use and the Ge'ez malak (መለክ) remained in throne names into the Gondarine period. The universal existence of a semantic shift in n-g-s across the Ethio-Semitic languages is evidence that it doesn't comprise separate branches of the Semitic language family.

In an ancient Aramaic inscription mentioning the god ʿAṯtar his name is followed by the title 𐡍𐡂𐡔 (ngš), corresponding to Ancient North Arabian 𐪌𐪔𐪆 (ngś), meaning "the ruler." The vocabularies of various other East and West Semitic languages such as Akkadian contained cognates to the Habesha term "negus" with definitions ranging from regional lord to tyrant.

== History ==
Negus is a noun derived from the Semitic root ngś, meaning "to reign". The title Negus literally translated to Basileus (Greek: βασιλεύς) in Ancient Greek, which was seen many times on Aksumite currency. The title has subsequently been used to translate the word "king" or "emperor" in Biblical and other literature. In more recent times, it was used as an honorific title bestowed on governors of the most important provinces (kingdoms): Gojjam, Begemder, Wello, Tigray and the seaward kingdom, (where the variation Bahri Negasi (Sea King), was the title of the ruler of present-day central Eritrea). The military title "meridazmatch" was initially used by the rulers of Shewa until the reign of Sahle Selassie, when he and his successors adopted the royal title as well. It was mistakenly used to refer to the Atse in western sources be they English, Polish, Hungarian or Romanian, and was loaned into Hindi through Arabic as "नजाशी."

== In popular culture ==
- In her 1904 book Through the Lands of the Serb, English anthropologist Mary E. Durham incorrectly suggested without evidence that the word negus is derived from the name of a Herzegovinian village called Njeguši.
- In the television series (US) "Star Trek: Deep Space Nine", the leader of the Ferengi holds the title of Nagus.
- Kendrick Lamar's 2015 song "I" references the word and draws comparisons to the ethnic slur "nigger".

== See also ==
- Emperor of Ethiopia
- Kebra Nagast
- Najashi
