= Menelik II's conquests =

1878–1904 conquests by the Ethiopian emperor

- Menelik II leading his army
Date	early 1880s–1904
Location	Present-day Ethiopia
Result	Shewan-Ethiopian victory

Belligerents
Ethiopian Empire: ∟ Shewa	Emirate of Harar; Kingdom of Wolaita; Kingdom of Kaffa; Dervish State; Oromo people and others...

Commanders and leaders
(Ethiopian Empire) Menelik II (Ethiopian Empire) Tekle Haymanot (Note: From 1882 onwards.) (Ethiopian Empire) Habte Dinagde (Ethiopian Empire) Darge Selassie (Ethiopian Empire) Tessema Nadew (Ethiopian Empire) Welde Aboye (Ethiopian Empire) Ras Makonnen (Ethiopian Empire) Gobana Dacche	Abdullahi II; Gaki Sherocho; Kawo Gaga; Hassan Enjamo; Mohamed Hassan and others...

Casualties and losses
- Estimates vary; civilian and war-induced deaths estimated in the millions

Menelik II's conquests, also known as the Agar Maqnat (Amharic: አገር ማቅናት, romanized: agär maqnat, lit. 'to position the country'), (Note: Implicitly "the colonization, Christianization, and development of land") were a series of late 19th-century military campaigns led by Menelik II, king of Shewa (1865–1889) and Ethiopian Emperor (1889–1913) to expand the territory of the Ethiopian Empire.

Ascending power in the de facto independent kingdom of Shewa in what is now central Ethiopia in 1865, Menelik II spent the early years of his reign consolidating his power and campaigning in Wollo to the north. After Emperor Yohannes IV forced him to submit in 1878 he turned his attention south. After defeating his rival Tekle Haymanot of Gojjam at the Battle of Embabo in June 1882 he began the first phase of his expansion, conquering most of the Oromo-dominated territory including Welega, the five Gibe kingdoms as well as the powerful Arsi confederation. In 1887 he conquered the small but prestigious Emirate of Harar. In 1889 he became Emperor and, five years later, initiated the second phase of his expansion with the invasion of Wolaita, followed by Aussa in 1895 and Kaffa and the Boorana-Oromo in 1897. By 1900 he had conquered the western lowlands, the northern shores of Lake Turkana and Ogaden, giving Ethiopia its present shape.

Menelik capitalized on growing centralization efforts, an increasing militarized state apparatus, and substantial arms imports from European powers. His campaigns mirrored European colonial practices—such as indirect rule, settler colonialism, and land dispossession—and were frequently justified by Menelik as part of a Christianizing civilizing mission. Central to the imperial structure in many southern regions was the neftenya-gabbar system, a settler-colonial arrangement that established Amhara dominance over newly incorporated regions through land grants, taxation, and forced labor. Menelik's expansionist drive transformed Ethiopia into one of the few African empires participating in the Scramble for Africa. While it preserved its sovereignty against European colonization—most notably through victory in the First Italo-Ethiopian War—the empire's growth was achieved through serious violence and repression that some historians today characterize as genocidal. Contemporary observers described severe population losses among the Oromo during the conquests, although estimates of the scale and causes of these losses vary considerably. The dramatic increase in Ethiopia's size helped establish Menelik's legacy as the architect of the modern Ethiopian state. The enduring social, political, and cultural legacies of these conquests have had a profound effect on Ethiopian state formation and interethnic relations, with consequences that continue to shape the country's internal conflicts into the present day.

== Background (before 1865) ==
Menelik II (1844–1913) belonged to a regional Amhara dynasty that claimed Solomonic descent via the 16th-century Emperor Dawit II. It was founded at the turn of the 18th century by Nagasi Krestos in Menz at the southern fringes of the Ethiopian Empire. Due to its geographic position the heads of this dynasty bore the title merid azmach ("Commander of the Rearguard"), although in the early 19th century they adopted the title ras ("Duke"). The polity they ruled over came to be known as Shewa and soon established its capital at Ankober. Shewa pursued a policy of steady expansion against neighboring Oromo groups, most of them Tulama. Subjugated Oromo, who were fierce horsemen, went on to join the Shewan army. Thus, Amhara came to be a dominant minority ruling over an Oromo majority, even though over time the Oromo adopted Christian Amhara culture and even identity. In their wars against the Oromo they allied with Muslim Argobba from Ifat, who eventually joined Shewa. Shewa tended to be highly unstable: whenever a ruler died, large portions of the population rebelled and had to be violently subdued once more.

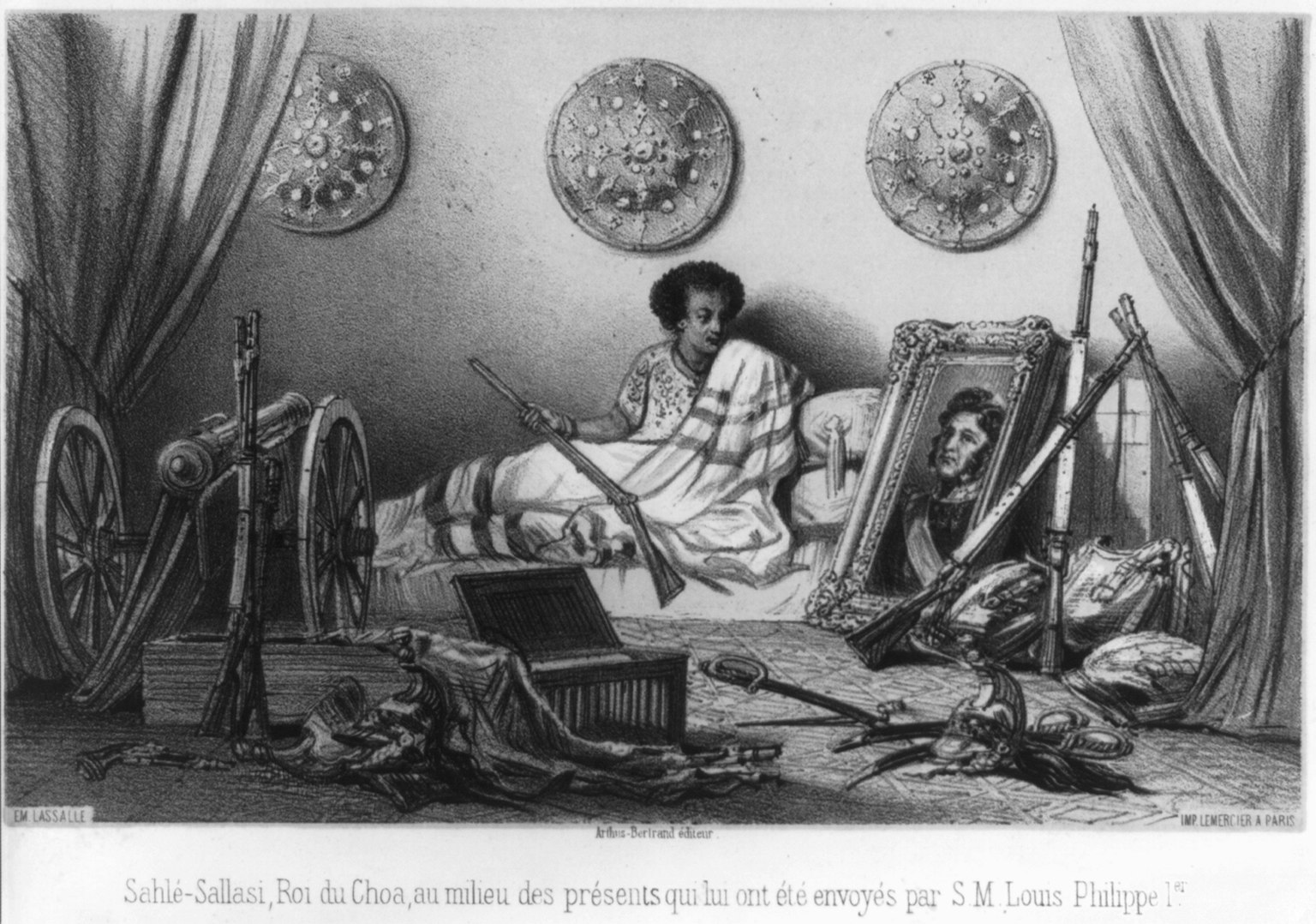
Sahle Selassie, grandfather of Menelik II, posing with French gifts (1842). Sahle Selassie consolidated Shewa by subjugating nearby Oromo groups, adopting the title "king" (negus) and entering diplomatic relations with European powers.

Under Shewa's hitherto greatest ruler, Menelik II's grandfather Sahle Selassie (r. 1813–1847) expansion continued. Sahle Selassie himself was said to lead 84 expeditions, which primarily revolved around pillaging and human trophy hunting. By the 1840s Shewa bordered Wollo (marked by the Wanchet and Borkana Rivers) in the north, the escarpment bordering the Danakil Desert in the east and exerted a more loose form of influence as far south as the plains of the Awash. From 1843 it began to launch first raids beyond the Awash and pushed as far south as Sodo in northern Gurageland, with Kistane chief Oda Lelisso submitting in return for protection against Oromo raiders. Having a total population of about 1,000,000 people, Shewa grew prosperous by controlling long distance trade routes that connected southwestern Ethiopia with the Red Sea. Eager to engage in trade with Shewa, European diplomats began to enter Shewa from the late 1830s. In order to further enhance his legitimacy Sahle Selassie adopted the title negus, "king".

Shewa had remained largely isolated from the bloody warfare that shook the Ethiopian Empire during the Zemene Mesafint (1769–1855) and stopped paying tribute to the Emperor in the late 18th century. Throughout most of the period the Empire was run by a dynasty of Oromo kingmakers from Yejju in northern Wollo who left Shewa alone. Things changed with the rise of Kassa Hailu, who between 1852 and 1855 crushed the Yejju Oromo and their vassals, united most the Empire and Wollo and crowned himself Emperor Tewodros II. In October 1855 he invaded Shewa, with its king Haile Melekot dying before giving battle. He installed a halfbrother of Haile Melekot as governor and took multiple nobles as hostages to his capital Magdala in Wollo, including Haile Melekot's teenaged son Sahle Maryam, the future Menelik II. Despite this the Shewans defied Tewodros' rule and he never managed to pacify the province.

== Early conquests and conflicts until the council of Liche (1865–1878) ==
Menelik escaped Magdala in 1865 and returned to Shewa, where he confronted Bezabeh, an appointee of Tewodros who had rebelled and declared himself negus of Shewa in 1863. Menelik, rightful heir of Haile Melekot, enjoyed wide support and large parts of Bezabeh's army deserted. He eventually surrendered to Menelik, who had him executed. In August 1865 Menelik was crowned king of Shewa and pacified the country until 1866.

=== Wollo (1867–1878) ===
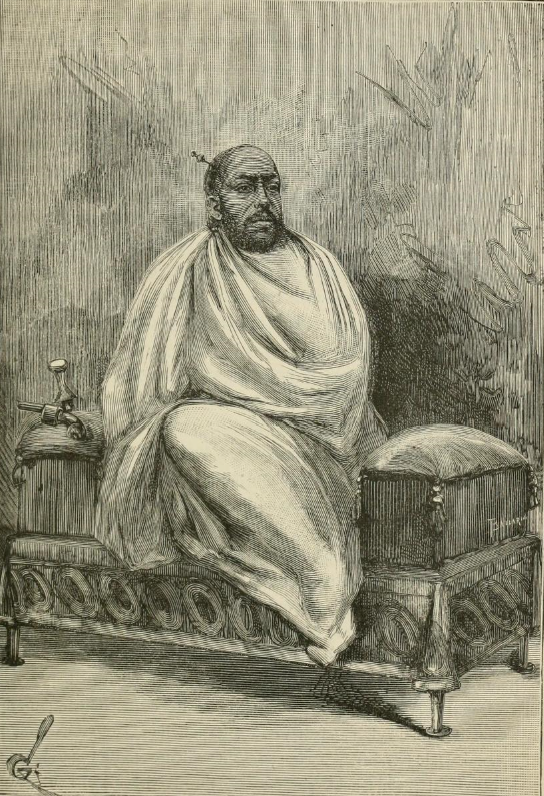
Engraving of a young Menelik II in about 1877

Menelik quickly challenged Tewodros' authority and proclaimed himself Emperor (neguse negast). By 1867 rebellions had caused the collapse of Tewodros' rule, now restricted to Magdala itself. In late 1867 Menelik mustered an army of 30.000 men and marched on Magdala, but retreated without giving battle. Despite this he still increased his influence in Wollo by backing Warqitu over her rival Mestawat, both being queen regents of the local Muslim Oromo Mammadoch dynasty of Were Himanu that had fragmented into two lines. In 1868 a British army invaded to free European captives that Tewodros had taken hostage and conquered Magdala on April 13, when Tewodros committed suicide. Menelik and Warqitu mustered a joint army to aid the British, but ultimately did not get involved. Tewodros was succeeded by Tekle Giyorgis II, but was soon defeated by Yohannes IV, who became Emperor in 1872. Despite his ambitions Menelik was too weak to challenge either of them.

From late 1868, when Werqitu died, Menelik repeatedly campaigned in Wollo against Mestawat and her son Abba Wato. He founded the town of Were Ilu and conquered all of Wollo south of Magdala. In 1873 he raised a large army against Abba Wato, who in 1874 called Emperor Yohannes for help. Arriving with an army in 1875, a clash between Menelik and Yohannes was only averted because Yohannes had to return north to confront an Egyptian invasion. Thus, Menelik finally managed to defeat Abba Wato in 1876 and unify Wollo under his rule, which he placed under his governor Mohammed Ali, a Mammadoch protegee of Werqitu who had married a daughter of Menelik and his wife Bafena. In 1877 Bafena convinced Menelik to attack Yohannes and launched a coup, which was also joined by Mohammed Ali. Menelik defeated and pardoned the coupists and exiled Bafena, but in early 1878 Yohannes invaded Shewa. After some skirmishes both sides came to negotiate at the council of Liche in February 15. Menelik agreed to submit to Yohannes and pay tribute, who in return recognized him as king of Shewa. Wollo was de facto divided between Menelik and Yohannes: after converting to Christianity Mikael (previously Mohammed Ali) became Yohannes' vassal and Hayle Maryam Menelik (previously Abba Wato) became Menelik's.

=== Hadiya ===
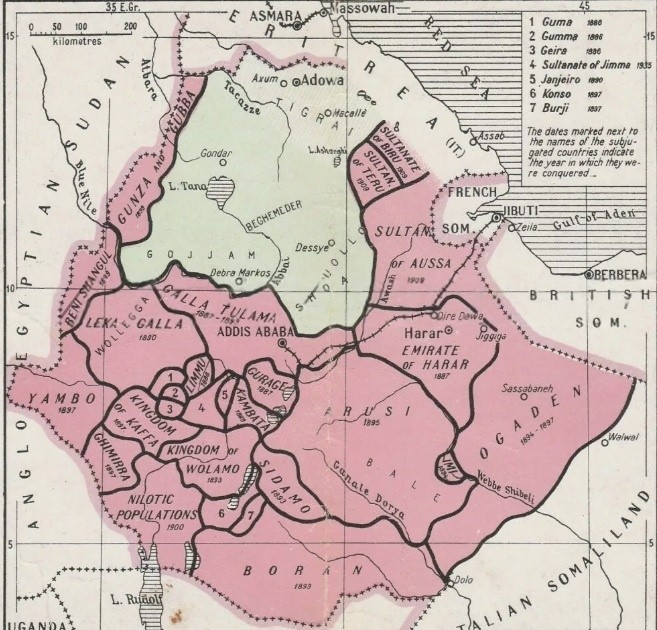
Map of Menelik's conquest of kingdoms from 1886 (Pre-conquest Abyssinia in green & post-conquest Abyssinia in pink)

In the late 1870s, Menelik led a campaign to incorporate the lands of Hadiya, which included the Gurage people, into Shewa. In 1878, the Soddo Gurage living in Northern and Eastern Gurageland peacefully submitted to Menelik and their lands were left untouched by his armies, likely due to their shared Ethiopian Orthodox faith and prior submission to Negus Sahle Selassie, grandfather of the Emperor. However, in Western Gurage and Hadiya, which were inhabited by the Sebat Bet, Kebena, and Wolane fiercely resisted Menelik. They were led by Hassan Enjamo of Kebena who on the advice of his sheiks, declared jihad against the Shewans. For over a decade, Hassan Enjamo fought to expel the Shewans from the Muslim areas of Hadiya and Gurage until 1888, when Gobana Dacche faced him in the Battle of Jebdu Meda where the Muslim Hadiya and Gurage army was defeated by the Shewans, and with that, all of Gurageland was subdued. Professor Lapiso states that the assistance of Habte Giyorgis Dinagde who was captured from a previous battle with the Hadiyans was instrumental for the Abyssinians being victorious in the conflict.

The Halaba Hadiya, however, under their chief Barre Kagaw, continued to resist until 1893 when the Abyssinians took advantage of the famine that had struck the region and led a conquest into their territory.

== Expansion until Menelik's coronation as Emperor (1878–1889) ==
=== The subjugation of the western Oromo by ras Gobana Dacche ===
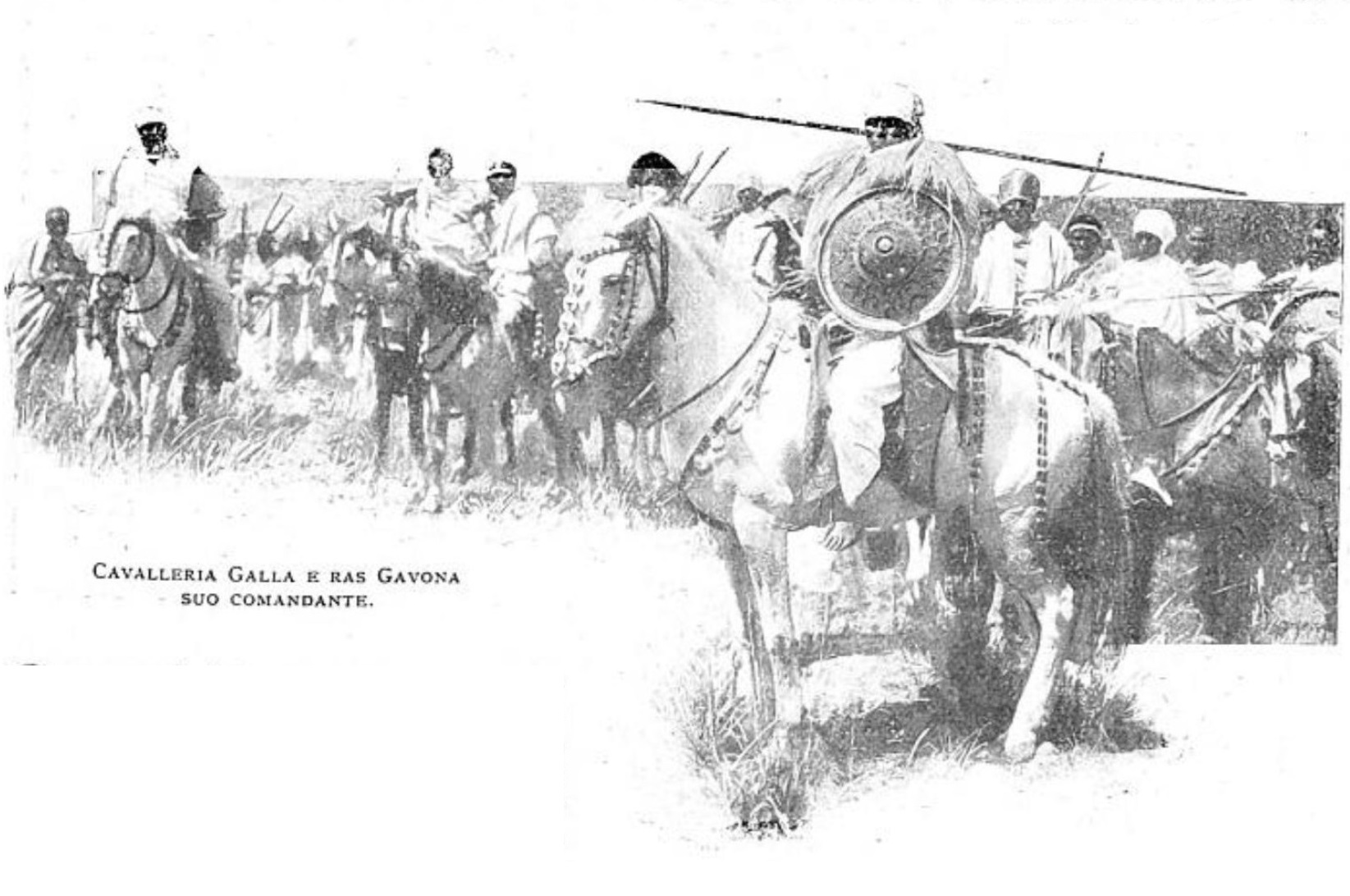
Illustration of ras Gobana Dacche and his Oromo cavalry.

By the early 1880s, Shewan and Gojjam forces had made their first forays over the Gibe River into the region of Welega ruled by king Kumsa Moroda from the Machaa people of the Oromo. Ras Gobana, an Oromo general serving Menelik, arrived in the region at the head of a well armed force of Shewan troops. Menelik's primary motive in conquering Welega was control over the gold producing districts in the west. Ras Gobana's campaigns in Western Welega from 1886 to 1888 established Shewan rule over the entire region and ended the threat of Mahdist incursions. Menelik's success in these Oromo regions was in great measure due to Ras Gobana, with his large cavalry force he conquered and extracted tribute from Oromo leaders for the Shewan court. Menelik dispatched an army against Gojjam to the wast and achieved a victory. Emperor Yohannes punished Menelik and the ruler of Gojjam for going to war by taking away parts of their regions, but recognized 'Menelik's right to the south-west.' Having secured the watershed to his south-west, Menelik turned his attention to the Muslim-inhabited south-east.

The Great Drought of 1888-92 allowed Menelik to draw on the masses of Amhara peasantry. With them he assembled an immense army that swept outwards from Shewa in search of spoils and tribute.

In 1891 the Abyssinians also annexed the Kingdom of Limmu-Ennarea.

=== The long war against the Arsi Oromo ===
As the Abyssinian armies pushed south into land inhabited by the Oromo people (the Galla land), the determined resistance of many Oromo groups was incapable of stopping the heavily armed invaders. One after the other, the Oromo people suffered defeat except for the Arsi people. Unlike the peasantry in the Christian north, the peoples of southern Ethiopia during Meneliks time were largely too poorly armed to resist his riflemen. Menelik's campaign against the Arsi were among his bloodiest and most sustained efforts. After a series of military campaigns over several years, they were finally subjugated by Shewan firepower.

Conflicts between the Kingdom of Shewa and the Arsi Oromo date back to the 1840s when Sahle Selassie (father of Ras Darge and previous king of Shewa) led expeditions against the Arsi after consolidating control of his Tulama conquests, extending the frontier of Shewa through Bulga and Karrayyu, and as far south as the territories of the Gurage, during which numerous examples of slave raiding and ethnic cleansing occurred. Shewans rulers had longed to pacify and incorporate this territory into their realm. In 1881, Menelik led a campaign against the Arsi Oromo, this campaign proved difficult, as the Oromos abandoned their homeland to wage guerilla war against the Shewan army, the Arsi inflicted significant losses against Menelik's forces through ambushes and raids. Menelik eventually left Arsi territory, and his uncle Darge Sahle Selassie was left in charge of the campaign. In September 1886, Darge faced a large Arsi force at the Battle of Azule, the result was an overwhelming Shewan victory as the Arsi Oromo were completely defeated by the Shewan army. A brutal turning point in the conflict occurred when many captured Arsi Oromo fighters and chiefs, along with thousands of men and women, were gathered for systematic mutilation. Before being allowed to return home, the right hands of men and the breasts of women were severed and tied around their necks. This mass mutilation was intended to hasten Arsi's surrender and deter future uprisings against Shewan rule. Although the exact number of victims remains unknown, estimates suggest thousands suffered. As Ras Darge Sahle Selassie had predicted, the Arsi were horrified and demoralized by the atrocity. After six years of intense fighting, fear and exhaustion left them with no choice but to surrender. Ras Darge Sahle Selassie then established Arsi as a province under his rule. After six military campaigns, during 1887 the Arsi finally were brought under the rule of Menelik. The Arsi of Bale were conquered in 1893, but sporadic resistance continued until 1897. After the conquest, much of the best Arsi grazing land was given as war booty to soldiers. Arsi Oromo during the 1960s spoke of the era of Amhara rule beginning after their subjection in 1887 as the start of an 'era of miseries'.

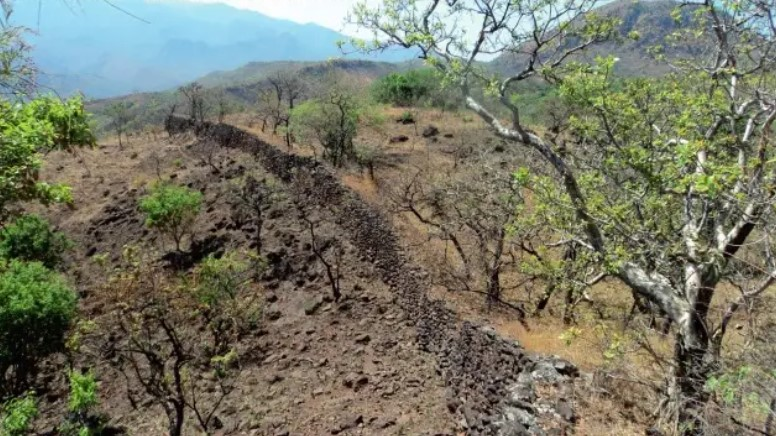
Ruins of the border wall of the Dawro kingdom. Elaborate defensive systems (keela) including walls, gates and ditches were common across the small kingdoms of southwestern Ethiopia.

The Oromo population was significantly reduced from massacres. Many Oromo were forcibly Christianized and compelled to 'Amharize' their names. From the initial raids, Menelik and his commanders had seized thousands of prisoners, resulting in an increase in slavery on the domestic and international market. Four years after the conquest of the Arsi, foreign travelers passing through their regions noted that they were regarded as slaves by the new rulers and in sold openly in markets. The campaigns during 1885 in Ittu Oromo territory that had preceded the occupation of Harar left whole tracts of their territory depopulated.

=== The conquest of Harar ===
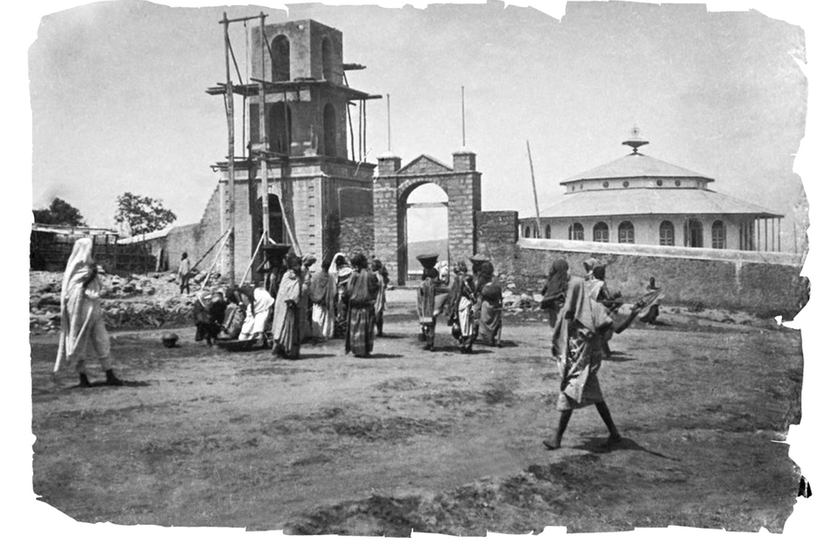
Photo of the ongoing conversion of Sheikh Bazikh Mosque to Medhanealem Church in Harar. Abyssinian churches were utilized as a symbol of domination by the colonizers of Harari region.

According to Jebril Marijou, the translator for Menelik in Zeila, France had urged Menelik to annex Harar. From 1883 to 1885 the Shewan forces under Menelik were attempting to invade the Chercher region of Harar and were defeated by the Ittu Oromo. During 1886, Menelik had started embarking on a large-scale campaign to subjugate the south. In 1886 an Italian explorer and his entire party were massacred by soldiers from the Emirate of Harar, giving the Emperor an excuse to invade the Emirate of Harar. The Shewans then led an invasion force; however, when this force was camped in Hirna, the small army of Emir Abdullah II shot fireworks at the encampment, startling the Shewans and making them flee towards the Awash River during the Battle of Hirna.

Menelik first used the significant influx of European arms he received at Harar. Harar was the most prominent of all the independent emirates and sultanates in the region. Menelik wrote to European powers: "Ethiopia has been for 14 centuries a Christian island in a sea of pagans. If Powers at a distance come forward to partition Africa between them, I do not intend to remain an indifferent spectator." He sent word to Emir Abdullah, ruler of the historic city of Harar which was pivotal to Muslim East Africa, to accept his suzerainty. The Emir suggested that Menelik should accept Islam. Menelik promised to conquer Harar and turn the principal mosque into a church, saying "I will come to Harar and replace the mosque with a Christian church. Await me." The Medihane Alam Church is proof Menelik kept his word.

In 1887, the Shewans sent another large force, personally led by Menelik II, to subjugate the Emirate of Harar. Emir Abdullah, in the Battle of Chelenqo, decided to attack early in the morning of Ethiopian Christmas, assuming they would be unprepared and befuddled with food and alcohol, but was defeated as Menelik had awoken his army early, expecting a surprise attack. The Emir then fled to the Ogaden and the Shewans conquered Hararghe. Finally having conquered Harar, Menelik extended trade routes through the city, importing valuable goods such as arms, and exporting other valuables such as coffee. He placed his cousin, Makonnen Wolde Mikael in control of the city. Harari oral tradition recounts 300 Hafiz and 700 newlywed soldiers killed by Menelik's forces in the short battle. The remembrance of the seven hundred "wedded martyrs" became part of Harari wedding customs to this day, when every Harari groom is given fabric that is called "satti baqla" in Harari, which means "seven hundred." It is a rectangular cloth from white woven cotton, ornamented with a red stripe along the edges, symbolizing the martyrs' murders. When he presents it, the giver (who usually is the paternal uncle of the woman's father) whispers in the ear of the groom: "So that you do not forget."

Contemporary testimony portrays Ras Makonnen, Menelik's governor of Harar from 1887, as fair and even-handed in his administration of the conquered city, which he found in a state of economic collapse with insecure trade routes, water shortages, and social tension between indigenous Muslims and incoming Christian settlers. He introduced new systems of taxation and worked to manage Christian-Islamic relations in the region.

The largest mosque in Harar (known as Sheikh/Aw Bazikh, "The capital Mosque," or Raoûf), located in Faras Magala, and the local madrassa were turned into churches, notably "Medhane Alem church" in 1887 by Menelik II after the conquest. The Italian engineer involved in the transformation of the mosque into a church commented on Menelik's Amhara soldiers, stating "Luckily locusts are a migratory animal and pass on; the Amhara stay. Worse still, locusts destroy only what is in the field; the soldiers destroy what is in the store".

== Final phase (1889–1900) ==
=== Expansion into Ogaden ===
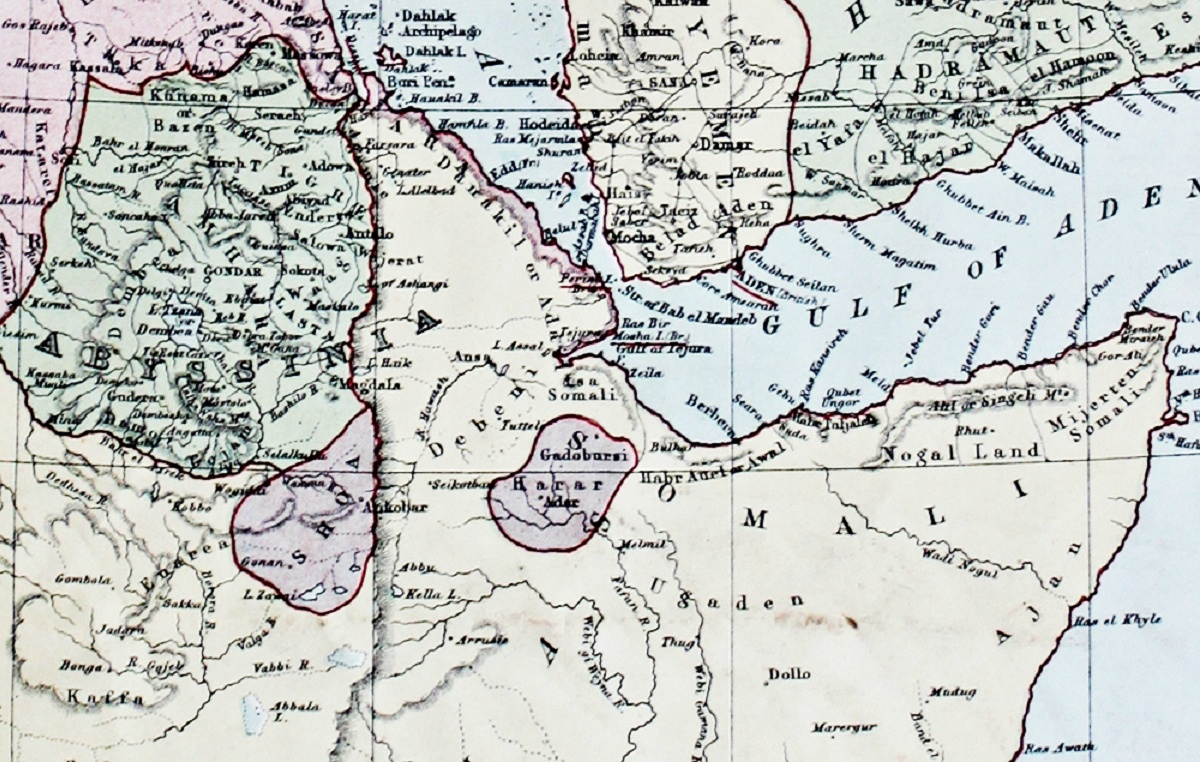
1873 cartography by John Bartholomew designating "Ugaden" east of Harar

After conquering the city of Harar in 1887, Menelik announced a program of ambitious expansions and colonialism to the European powers in 1891. This marked the start of a tentative yet violent invasion into the Ogaden. The emperor coveted not only Harar, but the cities of Zeila and Hargeisa – along with other great regions belonging to the Somalis. In the first phase of invasion, Menelik dispatched troops on frequent raids that terrorized the region. Indiscriminate killing and looting were commonplace before the raiding soldiers returned to their bases with stolen livestock. Repeatedly between 1890 and 1900, Ethiopian raiding parties into the Ogaden caused devastation. The large-scale importations of European arms completely upset the balance of power between the Somalis and the Ethiopian Empire, whereas the colonial powers from Europe blocked Somalis from receiving any type of firearms.

Many of the Somali clans in British Somaliland, such as those belonging to the Isaaq, signed protection treaties with the British in response to these invasions, which dictated the protection of Somali rights and the maintenance of their independence. In 1897, to appease Menelik's expansionist policy, Britain ceded almost half of the British Somaliland protectorate to Ethiopia in the Anglo-Ethiopian Treaty of 1897. This was reportedly done in exchange for the emperor's help against raids by Somali clans. Ethiopian authorities have since then based their claims to the Ogaden upon the 1897 treaty and the exchange of letters which followed it. The 1897 treaty was legally void because it presumed an authority which the Somalis had never accorded to Great Britain, as agreements that had been signed between the British and Somali had been to protect lands.

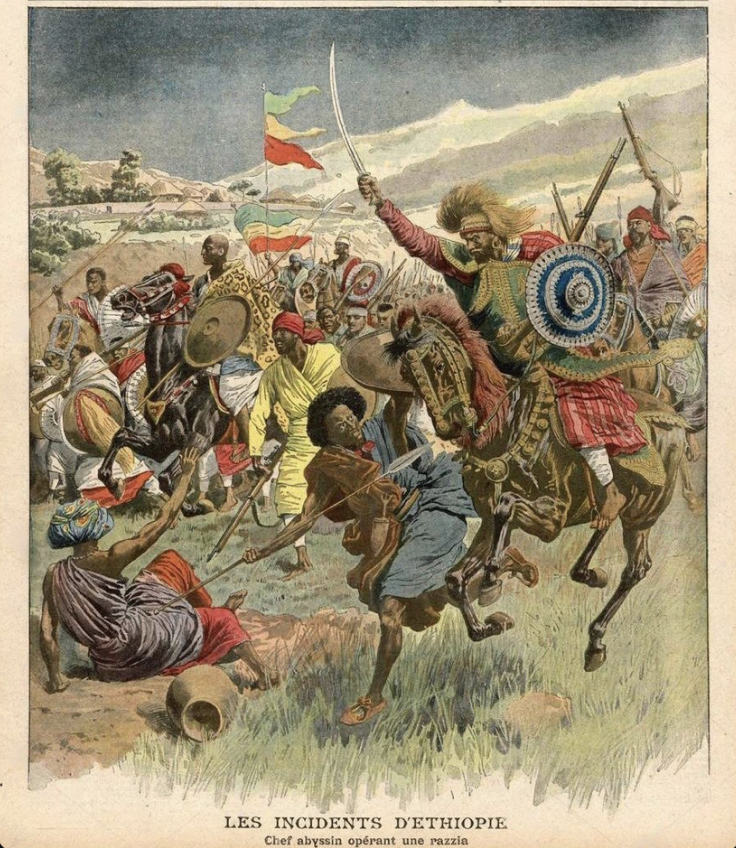
The cover of French magazine Le Petit Journal, titled "Abyssinian chief carrying out a razzia" (1908).

While previous Ethiopian raids had been primarily disruptive to trade, Emperor Menelik's well-armed incursions in the era of colonialism provoked significant unease among the Somalis all the way to the Banaadir coast. A force of several thousand Ethiopian horsemen armed with rifles pushed into the Shabelle valley near Balad, only a day's march away from Mogadishu during the spring of 1905. Several clans residing in the region engaged in battles with the invading forces, repulsing them. In several cases, the poorly armed Somali warriors devastated the invading armies. In 1893, British Army officer Colonel Swayne, who was visiting Imi was shown "the remains of the bivouac of an enormous Abyssinian army which had been defeated some two or three years before."

In the far eastern frontier, predominantly inhabited by Somalis, Professor of Anthropology Donald L. Donham observed that Menelik's imperial administration had dramatically failed to adapt to local religion and politics, while facing significant resistance from the Somali anti-colonial Dervish movement. As the Ethiopian Empire began expanding into Somali territories at the start of the 1890s, Jigjiga came under intermittent military occupation until 1900. At the turn of the century, Abyssinian troops occupied Jigjiga and completed the construction of a fort nearby. Following these incursions, Amhara settlers began arriving in Jigjiga and its surroundings for the first time. That year the Somali Dervishes had their first major battle when they attacked the Ethiopian garrison at Jigjiga with the aim of returning looted livestock. The following year, a joint British-Ethiopian military expedition was launched to crush the Dervishes. In the early decades of the 20th century, Ethiopia exerted no actual influence over the Ogaden east of Jigjiga, even after the treaty, and ruled in name only. When the boundary commission attempted to demarcate the treaty boundary in 1934, the native Somalis were unaware they were under Ethiopian rule.

=== Bale (1891–1892) ===
Between 1891 and 1892 the Empire conquered Bale, that is the country south of the Shebelle River. Like the territories north of the Shebelle it was also inhabited by Arsi Oromo, some of them having participated in the war against the Empire in the 80s, others being refugees. Some traditions maintain that ras Derge tried to weaken the Bale Arsi by intentionally spreading diseases among them, although there is little evidence to support this. Before ras Derge actually invaded in October 1891 he convinced multiple Arsi clan leaders to submit peacefully, allowing him to cross the Shebelle without opposition and establish a base at Gurranda. While pushing south he faced only sporadic and ill-organized resistance. The fiercest fighting took place in the eastern lowlands against the Jawe, Hawattu and particularly Raytu clans, led first by Dima Harre and, after his defeat, Dhadhi Terre. Although eventually easily defeating him, Derge accommodated Dhadhi Terre by granting him the title fitawari. In 1893 the Ethiopians moved the regional capital from Gurranda to Goba. A final revolt was quashed in Elekere in 1895.

=== Conquest of southernmost kingdoms ===
==== Wolaita ====
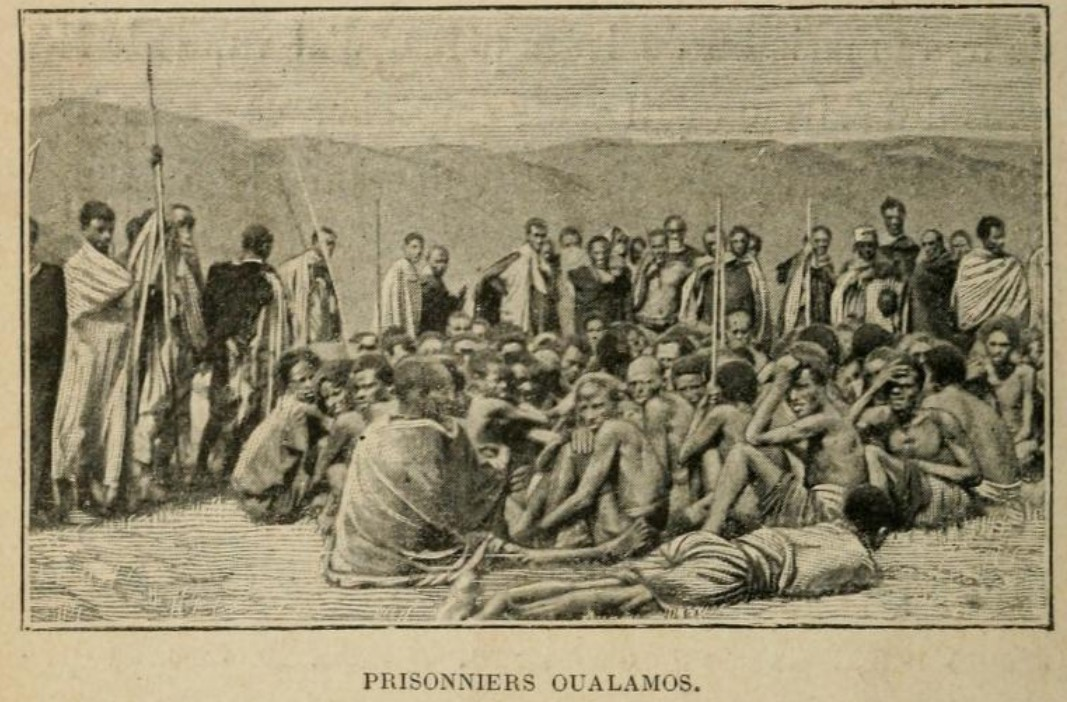
Prisoners captured during the invasion of the Wolaita kingdom, 1894

In 1890, Menelik invaded the Kingdom of Wolaita. The war of conquest has been described by Bahru Zewde as "one of the bloodiest campaigns of the whole period of expansion", and Wolaita oral tradition holds that 118,000 Wolaita and 90,000 Shewan troops died in the fighting. Kawo (King) Tona Gaga, the last king of Wolaita, was defeated, and Wolaita was conquered in 1895. Wolaita was then incorporated into the Ethiopian Empire. However, Welayta had a form of self-administrative status and was ruled by governors directly accountable to the king until the fall of Emperor Haile Selassie in 1974.

==== Kaffa ====
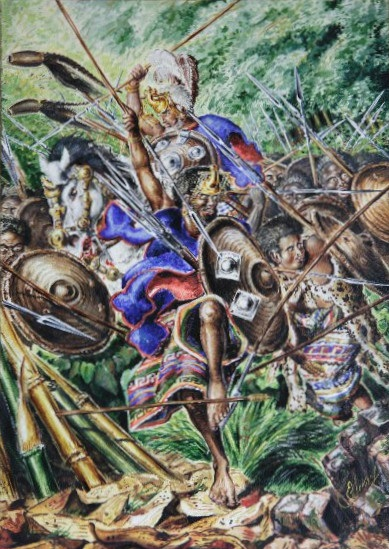
Painting of Kafficho warriors in battle by Yevgeni Senigov, c. 1900

The Kingdom of Kaffa was a powerful kingdom located south of the Gojeb River in the dense jungles of the Kaffa mountains. Due to constant invasions from the Mecha Oromos, the Kafficho people developed a unique defense system unlike anything seen in the Horn of Africa. The Kafficho built very deep trenches (Hiriyoo) and ditches (Kuripoa) along the borders of the kingdom to prevent intruders from entering. They also used natural barriers such as the Gojeb River and the mountains to repel invaders. As a result, Kaffa earned a reputation for being impenetrable and inaccessible to outsiders.

In 1895, Menelik II ordered the Kingdom of Kaffa to be invaded and sent three armies led by Dejazmach Tessema Nadew, Ras Wolde Giyorgis, and Dejazmach Demissew Nassibu, supported by Abba Jifar II of Jimma (who submitted to Menelik) to conquer the mountainous kingdom. Gaki Sherocho, the king of Kaffa, hid in the hinterlands of his kingdom and resisted the armies of Menelik II until he was captured in 1897 and exiled to Addis Ababa. After the kingdom was conquered, Ras Wolde Giyorgis was named its governor.

==== Nilo-Saharans ====
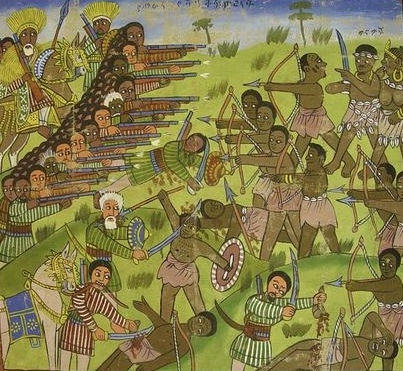
Painting on cotton cloth depicting a battle between the "Ahmara and the Shanqila," British Museum, 1920

The southwards expansion of Emperor Menelik II directed against the Oromo, Kaffa, and groups further south, was also perceived as a campaign of submission of the Shanqella. Prior to the Abyssinians' invasion, what today makes up the Benishangul-Gumuz Region was divided into several polities, the most powerful of which was ruled by one "Sheikh Khoyele": Fadasi (originally a region in the Kingdom of Fazughli), Komosha (Khomosha), Gizen, the Asosa Sultanate, and the Sheikhdom of Beni Shangul (a successor state to the Funj Sultanate which was a tributary of the empire during the Gondarine period). The Gubba (Arabic: Qubba) Sultanate was also conquered at the behest of Abdallahi ibn Muhammad of Sudan who feared the British would occupy it. In 1898, the eponymous capital of Asosa would become this area's political and economic center. After conflicts and raids receded during the 20th century, the Shangul people moved to the valleys where their villages are located today. After expanding into the region, Emperor Menelik II granted Britain use of a port along the Baro on 15 May 1902, and in 1907 the port and a customs station were founded at Gambela. According to Bahru Zewde, British interest in the concession was due, in part, to the attraction of "tapping the allegedly fabulous commercial potential of Western Ethiopia and drawing the whole region into the economic orbit of the Sudan," but also intended "to be a brilliant British countermove to avert the virtual commercial hegemony in Ethiopia that the Djibouti-Addis Ababa Railway seemed to promise the French." In fact it benefitted the Abyssinians themselves to not have their economy in the control of a single European power, whether French, British, or Italian, and Menelik was enacting a strategy of playing his colonial neighbors against each other to avoid any single one gaining a monopoly while opening his country to the benefits of trade and technology as part of a major program of modernization.

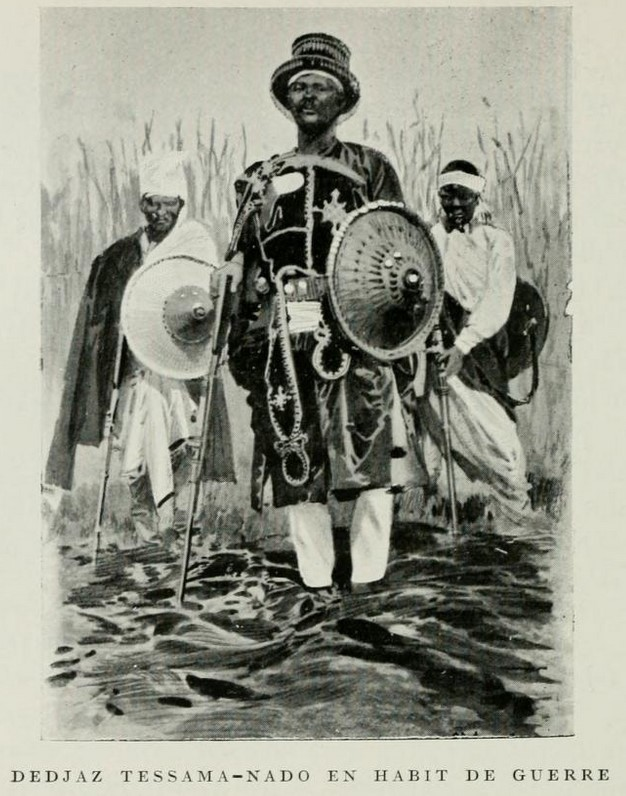
Dejazmach Tessema Nadew, who led an expedition to the White Nile in 1897–1898

Before formally assuming his new position as governor of Kaffa, Welde Giyorgis Aboye was ordered by Emperor Menelik to carry out an expedition into what is now Kenya to preempt British and French colonial ambitions in that direction. Ras Welde Giyorgis was instructed to advance from Kaffa into the south annexing all lands that lay along the way to the 2nd north meridian and establish a foothold at Lake Turkana. On 29 March 1898, Welde Giyorgis planted the Ethiopian flag on both of the lake's shores. On March 28, 1898, Officer Alexander Bulatovich wrote a first-hand account detailing a hostile exchange of words between the Turkana people and Welde Giyorgis Aboye's forces, to which Bulatovich was attached to as an advisor to the Ras.

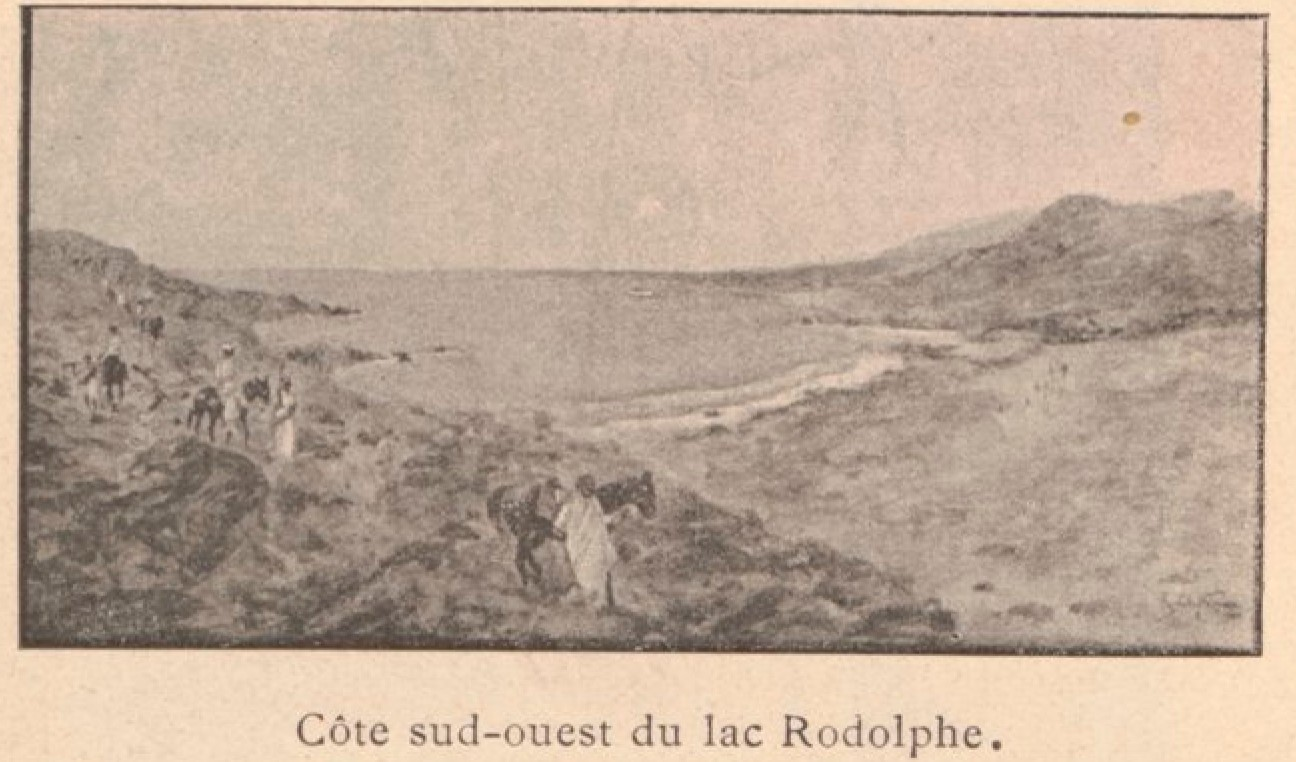
The expedition of dejazmach Nikolay Leontiev marching along the southwestern shore of Lake Turkana in what is now Kenya, 1899.

(Near Lake Rudolph) "Come submit to us," the Masai interpreter cried out to them, on order of the Ras.

Turkana tribe: "We don't know you," they answered from the other bank. "You Guchumba (vagrants), go away from our lands."
Abyssinians: "If you don't surrender voluntarily, we will shoot at you with the fire of our guns, we will take your livestock, your women and children. We are not Guchumba. We are from the sovereign of the Amhara Menelik."
Turkana tribe: "We do not know Amhara-Menelik. Go away! Go away!"

These talks brought no success, but when a dug-out canoe, found higher on the course of the river, arrived at their bank, the natives became more tractable and began to ask: "Who is this Amhara-Menelik to whom we are supposed to submit?"

Abyssinians: "We are Amhara, and Menelik is our great king."
Turkana tribe: "You will kill us if we come to you."
Abyssinians: "No, no. We will not kill you. Come. Bring tribute."
Turkana tribe: "Good. We will have a talk about that..."

"At this time, several Abyssinians moored to the opposite bank in order to bring across to our side another dug-out canoe which was there, and the natives hid." Afterwards the previous British-Italian border was renegotiated by Menelik with Ethiopian holdings running along the highland escarpment.

== Menelik's imperial strategy ==
Ethiopian Empire before conquests Ethiopian Empire after conquests

The Ethiopian Empire under Menelik II exhibited many classic features of European colonialism, including indirect rule, divide-and-rule tactics, cooptation of local elites, and prioritization of settler interests above all else. The imperial expansion closely mirrored the colonial expansions of the Spanish and Portuguese Empires. During the 1870s and 1880s, Menelik received advice from the French on managing a standing army and governing captured provinces using colonial methods.

A system of imperial conquest effectively based on settler colonialism, involving the deployment of armed settlers in newly created military colonies, was widespread throughout the southern and western territories that came under Menelik's dominion. Under the 'Neftenya-Gabbar scheme,' the Ethiopian Empire had developed a relatively effective system of occupation and pacification. Soldier-settlers and their families moved into fortified villages known as katamas in strategic regions to secure the southern expansion. These armed settlers and their families were known as the neftenya, and the peasant farmers assigned to them were known as the gabbar.

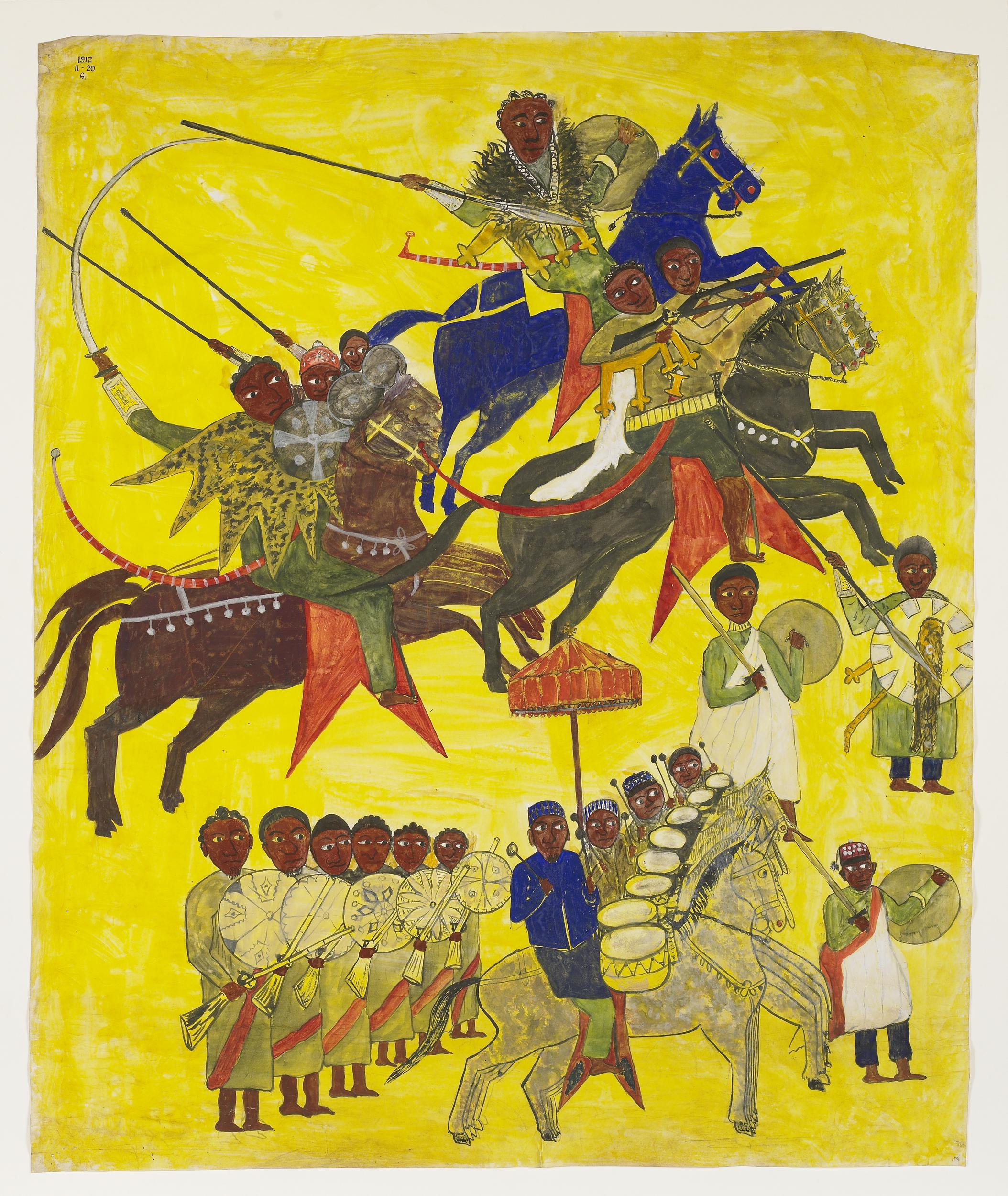
19th-century Ethiopian painting depicting a procession of musicians and warriors armed with rifles, spears and swords. British Museum.

The Neftenya (lit. 'Gun-carrier' or 'Armed settler') were assigned gabbar from the locally conquered population, who effectively worked in serfdom for the Neftenya. As Menelik's army drew soldiers from many regions of central Ethiopia, the neftenya who settled in the south were drawn from Amhara, Oromo, Gurage, and Tigray backgrounds, united primarily by Orthodox Christian identity rather than a single ethnicity. Several of Menelik's leading generals were themselves Oromo, most notably Ras Gobana Dacche.

The neftenya-gabbar relationship was a 'feudal-like patron-client relationship' between the northern settlers and southern locals. As land was taken, the northern administrators became the owners and possessed the right to dispose of land as they pleased. Those conquered found themselves displaced, often reduced to tenants on their own lands by the new Amhara ruling elite. The feudal obligations imposed on the gabbar were so intensive that they continued to serve the family of a neftenya even after the latter's death. The gabbar system worked efficiently for nearly half a century in financing the garrisoning and administration of the south until its formal dissolution in 1941.

The Encyclopaedia Aethiopica notes that "the record of the neftenya in southern Ethiopia varied widely, with some having a reputation of gross abuse and arbitrary exploitation, while others integrated and co-operated with local people," and that "only in later years a modus vivendi evolved whereby patterns of co-operation, incorporation or accommodation developed between local people and settlers." The entry also notes that comparably oppressive landlord-tenant conditions existed in parts of northern and central Ethiopia outside the conquest zones, including in the Gojjam Amhara region.

It was not employed in all parts of the regions Menelik expanded into for varying reasons. In the case of many southern lowlands 'fringes', the territory was not suitable for colonization by the Shewan highlander plough agriculturalists, and the lowland pastoralists were far harder to manage and control than the settled horticulturalists of the southern highlands. These regions were instead raided for revenue extraction, often in the form of livestock, into the 20th century.

Not all territories resisted. Abba Jifar II, king of Jimma, made a voluntary submission to Menelik in 1882. That decision saved Jimma from the destruction suffered by the four other Gibe-region Oromo kingdoms that chose to resist, and the kingdom retained a good deal of internal autonomy until Abba Jifar died in 1932. Central to Menelik's military expansion was Ras Gobana Dacche, an Oromo commander who had allied himself with Menelik when the latter returned to Shewa in 1865. Gobana won the Battle of Embabo in 1882 and secured the peaceful submission of Oromo leaders across the Gibe region, Wallaga, and Illubabor, territories the EA describes as "the three richest regions which henceforth became the economic backbone of Ménilék's empire." The Encyclopaedia Aethiopica describes Gobana as a "controversial historical figure": celebrated in Ethiopian national history as a great general and empire-builder, while Oromo nationalists regard him as a traitor who worked against his own people, a stance still referred to in Oromo discourse as the "Gobanist phenomenon."

Though some polities negotiated differing levels of autonomy through tribute payments and taxation, elsewhere local populations were frequently decimated by violent colonial expansions that rested largely on cultural assimilation. Due to economic motives driving the northern expansions, it was usually preferred to disturb indigenous economies as little as possible in regions where there was little resistance. Extreme violence was carried out during the conquest of regions like the Kingdoms of Wolaita and Kaffa to the south, along with Illubabor and other territories in the Sudanese borderlands. Military expeditions into the Somali-inhabited Ogaden region under Ras Makonnen were characterized by massacres and expropriation, laying foundations for future incorporation into the Ethiopian Empire. University of Oxford Professor of African History Richard Reid observes, "Menelik's empire was as brutally violent and as reliant on the atrocity-as-method genre of imperialism as the European colonial projects developing apace on Menelik's borders."

Menelik initiated what is referred to as 'Agar Maqnat', which implied the colonization, cultivation, and Christianization of land deemed unoccupied and ready for utilization. From the late 1880s, he dispatched armies and colonists across the west, south, and southeast. In the centuries prior to this, both the Oromo and Somali people were usually successful in containing Abyssinian expansion. Menelik's imperialism was the culmination of a century of Abyssinian militarization. His army had expanded to such a degree that continual raiding and pillaging became a core feature of the empire, necessary to keep the youthful and armed population preoccupied.

The Great Ethiopian Famine of 1888–92, known in Amharic as the Kéfu Qän ("evil day"), contributed directly to the pace of the southern expansion. The famine arose from a convergence of disasters: a rinderpest epidemic, possibly introduced through Italian-imported cattle in 1887, killed up to 92–93% of livestock in affected areas; a severe drought followed; and locust plagues compounded the devastation, with some estimates suggesting a third of the human population died. Among its consequences was the collapse of Oromo resistance to Menelik's southward advance, as communities already devastated by famine and epidemic were in no position to sustain military opposition.

Menelik's expansions coincided with the era of European colonial advances in the Horn of Africa, during which the Ethiopian Empire received significant military resources from foreign powers. France in particular poured arms into the country during the 1880s, alongside Russia and Italy, seeking to secure favor for protectorate status over the empire. During the earliest periods of Menelik's expansions in the 1870s, he was receiving military advice and aid from France. The influx of military equipment facilitated Emperor Menelik's unprecedented campaign of Amhara conquest and expansion. The Emperor conveyed to his European counterparts his 'sacred civilizing mission' to extend the benefits of Christian rule to the 'heathens'.

Menelik became a signatory to the Brussels Act of 1890, which regulated the importation of arms into the African continent. Italy sponsored Ethiopia's inclusion in this act, enabling Abyssinia to "legally" import arms. This move also served to legitimize the arms shipments that had been ongoing for years prior from France. Thus, when conflict later began with the Italians during the First Italo-Ethiopian War of 1895–96, the Ethiopian Empire had accrued a significant number of modern weapons that allowed it to fight on terms similar to the European powers and maintain expansion.

Under Menelik II, the Ethiopian Empire effectively participated in the Scramble for Africa alongside European powers. While at times rivaling Europeans present in the Horn of Africa (notably Italy), it entered into agreements and treaties with European colonialists over spheres of influence, much like the ones the competing foreign powers had made among themselves.

British writer Evelyn Waugh describing this nineteenth-century event stated:

The process (the creation of the Ethiopian Empire) was closely derived from the European model; sometimes the invaded areas were overawed by the show of superior force and accepted treaties of protection; sometimes they resisted and were slaughtered with the use of modern weapons which were being imported both openly and illicitly in enormous numbers; sometimes they were simply recorded as Ethiopian without their own knowledge.

The Encyclopaedia Aethiopica, the standard scholarly reference on Ethiopian history, describes Menelik as someone who "may justifiably be regarded as the founder of the modern Ethiopian state" and judges that while his empire "proved in some respects to be deeply flawed," he "did no more than other empire-builders of his era."

== List of polities involved ==
The following kingdoms, sheikhdoms, emirates, and tribal groups were involved in Menelik II's conquests:

List
- Kingdom of Limmu-Ennarea
- Kingdom of Gera
- Borana Oromo
- Guji Oromo
- Gedeo people
- Arsi Oromo
- Welega
- Konso people
- Kingdom of Leqa Neqamte
- Kingdom of Leqa Qellam
- Kingdom of Jimma
- Emirate of Harar
- Kingdom of Wolaita
- Kingdom of Kaffa
- Kingdom of Hadiya
- Sheikhdom of Beni Shangul
- Sultanate of Gubba
- Sheikhdom of Asosa
- Sheikhdom of Khomosha
- Kingdom of Gomma
- Kingdom of Guma
- Kingdom of Gofa
- Kingdom of Janjero
- Sidama Kingdom
- Amarro Kingdom
- Kullo‑Konta
- Kingdom of Dawro
- Majangir people
- Asilli people
- Boma people – not to be confused with the Boma people (Congo)
- Morelli people
- Bench people
- Gumuz people
- Mursi people
- Suri people
- Me'en people
- Dizi Chiefdoms
- Murtu people (extinct)
- Gumba people (extinct)
- Somali clans:
  - Dervish Movement
    - Dhulbahante
      - Beidyahan
      - Faarax Garaad
      - Mudugh
      - Omar Mahmoud
      - Bahgeri
    - Habr Je'lo
    - Habar Yoonis
  - Other Somali clans
    - Ogaden
    - Issa
    - Gadabuursi
    - Geri Koombe
    - Bartire
    - Reer Baare
    - Reer Amaadin
    - Habar Tol Ja'alo Gaashaanbuur
  and others...

== Consequences and legacy ==
1881–1890.

1889–1894.

1897–1904.

The incorporation of the southern highlands created unprecedented resources for the imperial core. Before the mid-19th century, Emperor Tewodros II had relied on tribute from the central regions for revenue, but by the start of the 20th century, these same regions provided very little and the majority of state revenue was drawn from the south. Exaction on northern peasants by the imperial state was lightened, and the burden was shifted to the newly ruled southerners. While wealth flowed north to the Amhara imperial core, driving regional development, the newly conquered lands saw little change except for the worsening pre-feudal economic conditions of the local population, exacerbated by land seizures and looting by imperial forces.

In contrast to imperial expansion into the central and northern highlands, where locals were protected by shared ethnicity and kinship, the people of the south lost most of their traditional lands to the Amhara rulers and were reduced to tenancy on their own lands. The vast southwards expansions carried out by Emperor Menelik exacerbated the divide between the largely Semitic-populated north and the primarily Cushitic-inhabited south, creating the conditions which encouraged significant future social and political transformations. Ethiopian historian Dr. Lapiso Gedelebo described the consequences of Menelik's conquest:

Menelik managed to effectively destroy the other competing centers of the country and elevate his own group to a position of dominance and power. In conclusion, though Amhara interests and the national interests converged at certain points. Menelik's policies should be best understood as the Amharanization, rather than the nationalization of Ethiopia. This was his legacy and herein can be found the seeds of some of the problems of Ethiopia today.

In southern Ethiopia, the word Amhara is often treated as synonymous with the term Neftenya, the title given to the soldiers Menelik employed in this period to colonize the people of the south while living off the indigenous population and their lands. Based on convergent colonialist approaches, cooperation between Menelik and Belgian king Leopold II was attempted more than once. In the view of Ernest Gellner, Ethiopia had become "a prison-house of nations if ever there was one." The Tigrayan Peoples Liberation Front (TPLF), which came to dominate Ethiopian politics at the end of the 20th century, castigated the formation of the centralized empire state under Menelik as, "the beginning of national oppression" in the group's manifesto. The roots of the current Ethiopian civil conflict can be traced back to Menelik's campaigns to expand the empire and the extreme violence associated with it.

The predominantly Christian northern provinces often fared better than the Muslim or pagan areas taken over by Menelik in the south, largely because they were less frequented by the Emperor's large armies and the inhabitants were better armed to defend themselves.

=== Slavery ===
Menelik's expansions into what is now southern Ethiopia set a pattern of razing entire districts, killing all male defenders and then enslaving the women and children. The southern expansions resulted in an immense increase in the number of slaves within the empire and raids fueled a national market for the trade. Menelik actively aided and abetted slavery in this period, despite his public proclamations to the contrary. Before the mid-1890s, Menelik rarely opposed the slave trade of captives taken during the expansions. He personally gained half of the plunder and captives taken, while his soldiers and generals divided the rest according to their respective ranks. Eventually, Menelik did sign an agreement with the British Empire to rein in and suppress the Ethiopian slave trade, which he backed with edicts - though they were not always enforced. Any restraint and order imposed after the agreements with the British collapsed as Menelik's health later deteriorated.

=== Characterization as a genocide ===
During the wars to expand the Ethiopian Empire, Menelik's army committed genocidal atrocities against peoples of the invaded territories, which included torture, mass killings, and the imposition of large-scale slavery. Some estimates of the number of people who were killed in the atrocities that were committed during the war and the famine which coincided with it go into the millions. The Oromo territories experienced catastrophic demographic decline and exploitation due to the behavior of Menelik's colonial governors. According to Mohammed Hassen, the ruthless nature of Menelik's warfare and the ensuing natural calamities (most notably the 1890s African rinderpest epizootic) followed a pattern of devastation in other conquered areas. French missionary Martial de Salviac, who lived with the Oromo during the conquest, noted the expansion "reduced the Oromo population from an estimated 10 million in 1870 to 5 million in 1900." The Oromo religion was reportedly banned and "after the conquests, the Oromo institutions of self-governance were abolished. The indigenous leadership was liquidated-the land confiscated, and cultural institutions destroyed." This is mirrored by Alexander Bulatovich, Menelik's Russian military aide, who described the "dreadful annihilation of more than half of the population during the conquest", which he said "took away from the Galla all possibility of thinking about any sort of uprising." Eshete Gemeda separately states, but without any evidence, that the wars of the 1870s, 1880s and 1890s in Oromia were marked by the deaths of more than six million Oromo civilians.

=== Religious violence ===
The concept of Ethiopian identity, as demonstrated in Menelik's conquests, was founded on the notion of embracing Christianity. Under the reign of Shewan king Sahle Selassie, the appointed Muslim Ifat governors were Hussain of Argobba, and his father Walasma Mohamed who professed their origin from the Walasma dynasty of the Middle Ages. Yifat, former center of the eponymous sultanate, was host to Aliyu Amba and various other towns facilitating trade between Abyssinia and the Emirate of Harar (which had increased during the reign of Sahle Selassie). It became the site of forceful conversions of Muslims to Christianity by Menelik under the orders of Emperor Yohannes IV during a reign marked by an increase in religious violence. This led to conflicts with the Muslims in the region one notably led by Argobba leader Talha Jafar. French writer Élisée Reclus in 1890 describes the fate of the initial inhabitants and dwellings of Ifat:

As in Abyssinia properly so-called, the Shoa Mahommedans have been forcibly converted. They were formerly very numerous, and the name of Jiberti, by which they are known throughout Abyssinia, is a reminiscence of their holy city of Jabarta in Ifat, which has since disappeared.

== See also ==
- Territorial evolution of Ethiopia
- Neftenya
- Scramble for Africa
- Colonisation of Africa
