= Gaki Sherocho =

Last king of Kaffa (reigned 1890–1897)

- Taten
- Tato Gaki Sherocho in ceremonial dress

King of the Kingdom of Kaffa
- Reign: 6 April 1890 – 10 September 1897
- Born: Anderaccha
- Died: 1919; Addis Ababa
- Dynasty: Kingdom of Kaffa

Gaki Sherocho (died 1919) was the last king (tato) of the Kingdom of Kaffa from 6 April 1890 to 10 September 1897, in what is now Ethiopia. He is usually called by the Kaffa "Chinito", the diminutive of Taten Chini ("King Chini").

== Reign and downfall ==
According to Amnon Orent's informants, Gaki Sherocho had many more fields cleared from forests during his reign than any of his predecessors, and he organized the districts of Kaffa to kill the wildlife that harmed the crops and livestock. The tradition also reports that he ruled with an iron hand, and traveled widely in the countryside to enforce his laws.

In January 1897, Emperor Menelik II sent out three armies under the leadership of Ras Welde Giyorgis Aboye (who was appointed beforehand as governor of Kaffa), Dejazmach Demissew Nassibu, and Dejazmach Tessema Nadew to conquer Kaffa. King Abba Jifar II of Jimma supported the Ethiopian forces with his own troops. Ras Walda Giyorgis attacked Gaki Sherocho's kingdom from Konta to the southeast, which was not as strongly fortified as the Jimma-Kaffa boundary along the Gojeb River.

Against an army of 31,000 men, 20,000 armed with rifles, king Gaki Sherocho could marshal about 300 obsolete firearms. Despite this, according to historian Harold Marcus, he called up all men between the ages of eight and 80 "for what was to become a guerilla struggle against overwhelming outside forces." He took the precaution of burying his crown on Mount Butto, trusting in the legend that the kingdom would not fall as long as this royal symbol remained in Kaffa. A more pragmatic tactic is recorded by Alexander Bulatovich, who visited Kaffa and met with some of the Ethiopian participants: destroying the grain supplies. "Knowing very well that the Abyssinians during campaigns supplied themselves exclusively with the provisions of the region under attack," wrote Bulatovich, "Tato Chenito [Gake Sherocho] issued an edict which prohibited producing any crops, even planting. He hoped that the lack of provisions would force the Abyssinians to retreat, and that only the Kaffa, who were used to it, could nourish themselves."

Upon the fall of his capital Anderaccha, Gaki Sherocho fled into the hinterlands of his kingdom, where he was able to elude capture for nine months. Chris Proutky claims that he was able to do this because he was "loved by his people"; Bahru Zewde, on the other hand, describes him as despotic and states that this quality led to his downfall.

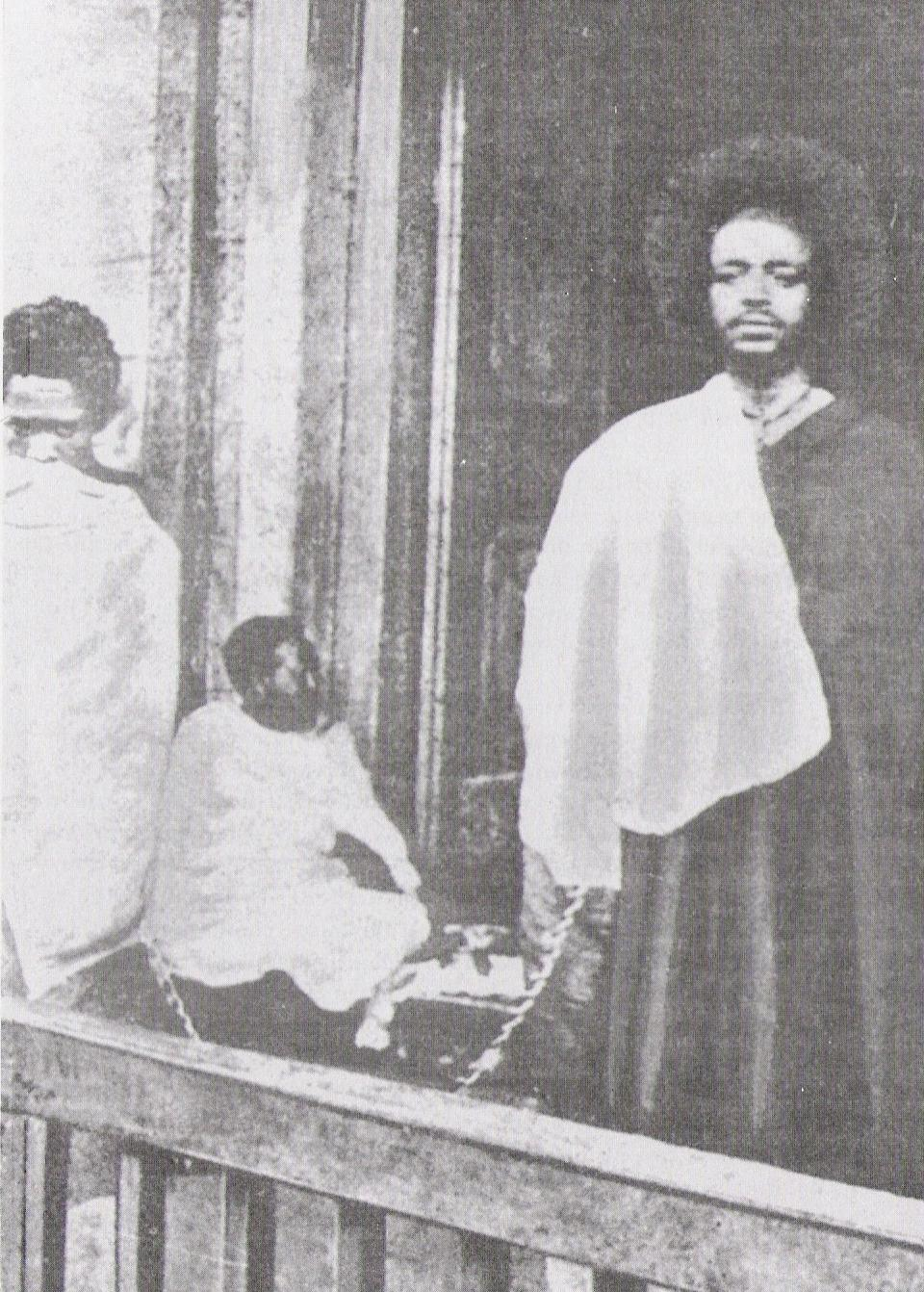
Tato Gaki Sherocho in chains after his defeat against Ras Welde Giyorgis Aboye in 1897

Captured on 10 September, Gaki Sherocho was brought in silver chains (forged out of silver looted from his own treasury) to Addis Ababa. Ras Walda Giyorgis had forced informants to reveal the location of the crown. Gaki Sherocho had to formally show his submission before Menelik II in Addis Ababa. He was then held prisoner at the former capital of Ankober. Athill relates that "so much prestige was attached to the royal crown that Menelik had it sent to Switzerland for fear that its presence in Abyssinia should encourage the descendants of Galito [Gaki Sherocho] to rise in rebellion for its recovery." Two lamentations ascribed to Gaki Sherocho bemoans his fate in captivity, recalling his days of freedom and abundance in independent Kaffa.

After the death of Menelik II he was taken to Addis Ababa, where he died in 1919. He was survived by 9 children.
