= Kingdom of Konta =

19th-century Omotic kingdom in southwestern Ethiopia

Kingdom of Konta Käwo Konta (Kontatsuwa) / Gobo (Käfa name)
- c. 1800–1893
- Status: Independent kingdom; nominal vassal of the Kingdom of Kaffa before c. 1800
- Capital: Ameya (near Mount Damota)
- Common languages: Kontatsuwa (North Omotic), Käfa, Mé'en
- Religion: Indigenous Omotic traditional religion, Ethiopian Orthodox
- Government: Hereditary monarchy
- King (kati / kawo)
  - c. 1800–c. 1837: Gobe (first)
  - c. 1889–1893: Sakallo (last independent)
- History
  - Founded: c. 1800
  - Partition into Konta and Koysha: c. 1837
  - Secession of Ela: Mid‑19th century
  - Conquest: 1889–1893
  - Deposition of Sakallo by Ras Wälda Giyorgis: 1893
Preceded by	Succeeded by
Ometo and Nilotic chiefdoms	Ethiopian Empire
- Today part of: Konta Zone, South West Ethiopia Peoples' Region, Ethiopia

The Kingdom of Konta (also spelled Kwinta, Kwéncha, Konč, Koncha; known to the neighbouring Käfa as Gobo or Kobo; identified in the 15th‑century itineraries of Zorzi as Conce) was a short‑lived Omotic‑speaking state in what is today southwestern Ethiopia. It was founded around 1800 by the warrior‑king Gobe and was the last independent kingdom to arise in the region before absorption by the Ethiopian Empire under Menelik II at the end of the 19th century.

Konta developed a centralised administration, a tribute system, and a formal royal court. Its rapid rise and sophisticated political structure have attracted scholarly attention as a prime example of state‑building dynamics in the southern Ethiopian highlands.

After the Amhara conquest (1889–1893), the former kingdom was administered as Kullo Konta (Ge'ez: ኩሎ፡ኮንታ) within the province of Käfa, a name that joined the derogatory Amharic term for the neighbouring Dawro with that of the Konta. In the 20th century the area became successively a woreda, an awragga, and a special woreda of the Southern Nations, Nationalities, and Peoples' Region (SNNPR). Since 2021 it has constituted the Konta Zone of the South West Ethiopia Peoples' Region.

== Historiography and sources ==
Until the mid‑20th century, southern Ethiopia was among the least‑documented parts of Africa. Systematic fieldwork began only with the Frobenius Institute's research programme, launched in 1950. The principal scholarly source on Konta is Eike Haberland's 1981 article "Notes on the History of Konta: A Recent State Foundation in Southern Ethiopia", which draws on oral traditions he collected in the neighbouring Dawro in 1970 and in Konta itself in October 1974. His principal informants were the local chiefs Qäññazmač Goba Doyé, Eräsa Adako Arba, and Balämbäras Täsaw Sana.

Earlier European accounts—including those of Antoine d'Abbadie (1890), Jules Borelli (1890), and the Italian colonial officer Piccaia (1940)—provide fragmentary information, but Haberland cautioned that some authors (e.g., Bieber, Mylius, Grühl) are unreliable for chronology.

== Historical context ==
Research by the Frobenius Institute overturned the earlier assumption that the states of southern Ethiopia were of great antiquity. Without exception they arose in relatively recent centuries, stimulated either by expansion of the Christian empire to the north or by earlier Muslim pressure from the east. The new kingdoms of Käfa, Wolaytta, Dawro, and later, Konta, differed from older polities by their explicit drive for territorial expansion, which was limited only by natural barriers such as the deep river gorges of the region.

A defining feature of these states was the requirement of dynastic legitimation: a king was expected to possess supernatural descent, and lineages lacking such a claim risked being overthrown by a dynasty whose origin myth appeared more potent. The foundation myth of the gosana'a dynasty, from which the Konta kings descended, illustrates this principle.

== Foundation myth: the Gosana'a dynasty ==
=== The origin myth of Anifo and Gose ===
The history of Konta is inseparable from the Gosana'a dynasty, which also ruled in Doko, Bälta, Basketto, Oyda, Gozza, Gäyla (Galila), and Koysha. According to the myth, a virgin named Anifo was impregnated by the rays of the sun while bathing in the Wombo River. She gave birth to a son and, having no husband, cast the child into the water. The infant did not sink but floated on the surface. A woman of the despised manna (potter) caste retrieved him with a crook (gose), and consequently his descendants were called gosana'a ("crook children") or auwa‑na ("sun children"). When the boy, named Gose, grew up, he travelled to Wurka in northern Gofa, struck the earth with his staff, and caused a spring to flow in an arid land. The people proclaimed him their king (kati) and rain‑maker (ira‑kati). After his death the sacred and political offices were divided between his two sons, and his descendants dispersed across the region, founding new dynasties wherever they went.

=== Transmission and Biblical parallels ===
Haberland noted that the myth contains striking Biblical motifs—virgin birth, the child exposed on the water and rescued (cf. Exodus 2:1 ff.), sovereignty over rain and water—and argued that these cannot be accidental. Local communities incorporated Christian topoi into their legitimating narratives without necessarily converting to Christianity, a pattern attested widely in the Ethiopian south.

== Foundation: Gobe’s conquest (c. 1800) ==
=== Pre‑Konta population ===
Before Gobe’s arrival, the area that became Konta was a contested zone between the expanding kingdoms of Käfa (west) and Dawro (east). Small groups of Mé'en (Nilotic) pastoralists, Ometo agriculturalists, and Käfa settlers lived under minor chiefs, some paying token tribute to the king of Käfa. The Konta themselves had been nominal vassals of Käfa from at least 1600, while the Dawro to the east were periodically dependent on the Welayta Malla dynasty.

=== Gobe’s invasion ===
Gobe, the ninth descendant of Gose, came from either Abba Malo or Doko. He crossed the Omo River in the late 18th century, fought his way through the region village by village, and expelled the Golda (Mé'en) chief Bambo Dunkurru from the lowlands and the Čara chief Soyno from Koysha. He was accompanied by his potter bodyguard and members of several sibs characteristic of the Doko‑Basketto region. Conquered land was distributed to warriors on a meritocratic basis: any man who declared "I have served you!" received land and an office.

The date of ≈1800 is established by cross‑referencing: Gobe married the sister of the Dawro king Hallälé (reigned c. 1775–1835), and in 1843 d'Abbadie recorded that Gobe’s son had just succeeded, implying Gobe died around 1837. By the 1840s Konta was already a fully established state. The name Gobo, by which Käfa knew the kingdom, derived from the king’s personal name.

== Political and administrative organisation ==
Konta adopted a centralised structure modelled on neighbouring Dawro. The kingdom was divided into districts (sunta), each governed by officials chosen by rotation from elected representatives and confirmed by the king. Titles drew on both Amharic and Ometo precedents: eräsa, guda, däna, mečana, kosuma, huduga, bitan te. The state maintained royal estates, a substantial court with a formal ceremonial, and a tribute system. Its frontiers were defended by earthen ramparts, deep ditches, and guarded gates—remains that were still visible when the German traveller Friedrich J. Bieber crossed the region in 1905. The most important royal prerogative was the right to pronounce death sentences, separating kingship from the limited authority of subordinate chiefs.

== Partition into Konta and Koysha (c. 1837) ==
Upon Gobe’s death the kingdom was divided between two of his seven sons: the core Konta in the north and east, and Koysha in the south. The 1843 note of d'Abbadie describes "Gobo comprises three kingdoms: Konta, Koysha, Maro ou Malo." Togo, a son of Gobe, was granted Koysha after a quarrel with his brother Sigo; the separation was later formalised in a famous diplomatic exchange:

The king of Konta sent old men to the king of Koysha carrying a sack of teff (Poa eragrostis), which they scattered before him: "My warriors are as numerous as these grains!" The king of Koysha replied by sending the messengers back with a sack of ground red pepper, scattered before the king of Konta so that the pungent powder stung his nose and eyes: "My warriors are as sharp as this!" Thereupon the king of Konta abandoned his animosity.

No wars were ever fought between the two fraternal states, though Koysha was constantly engaged in warfare against the Čara and Golda. The Sewasew encyclopedia notes that some early sources mention Konta, Kullo, and Koysha as three separate kingdoms, but Koysha was in reality the lowland portion of Konta, created by the internal dynastic partition of ≈1837.

== Royal genealogy ==
The table below lists the kings of Konta as recorded by Haberland and cross‑checked with other sources. The dates are approximate and based on the royal genealogy and external synchronisms.

Kings of Konta (approximate dates)
Monarch	Reign	Notes
Gobe	c. 1800 – c. 1837	Founder; married sister of Dawro king Hallälé.
Käbe	c. 1837 – c. 1845/50	Son of Gobe; died childless.
Sigo	c. 1845 – c. 1875	Son of Gobe; partitioned the kingdom; the Ela district seceded during his reign.
Hatsyo	c. 1875 – c. 1889	Son of Sigo; offered weak resistance to the Amhara invasion.
Sakallo	c. 1889 – 1893	Deposed by Ras Wälda Giyorgis; died of smallpox in 1893.
Lutse	c. 1893 – d. <1910	Lost Ela district as punishment for defying Ras Wälda Giyorgis; died childless.
Gučče	c. 1910 – c. 1950	Brother of Sakallo; served under Ethiopian and Italian administrations.
Mulugëta	c. 1950 – post‑1974	Son of Gučče; functioned as traditional chief; still held the royal gold ring in 1974.

In Koysha, the line continued separately; as of 1974 the traditional chieftaincy was held by the kawona Farda Barbara.

== The Ela secession ==
During the reign of Sigo, the frontier district of Ela (on the border with Käfa) seceded from Dawro and attached itself to Konta, following a series of events that illustrate the personalistic nature of politics in the region. Sam'ako, a prince of the Wolaytta tigre (royal family), fled his brother the king and took refuge at the court of Dawro. King Hallälé gave him land, horses, and cattle, and married him to his sister Toke, who had declared, "I am a princess and can only marry a prince." Sam'ako was appointed eräsa (district chief) of Ela. Later, urged by his wife, he defected to Konta, informing the Konta king Sigo of his plan. Sigo offered Ela a favourable autonomous status of tribute exemption and internal self‑rule, but without the right to impose death sentences. Ela remained part of Konta until the Amhara conquest, after which Ras Wälda Giyorgis detached it as an independent district to punish King Lutse.

== Amhara conquest and incorporation (1889–1893) ==
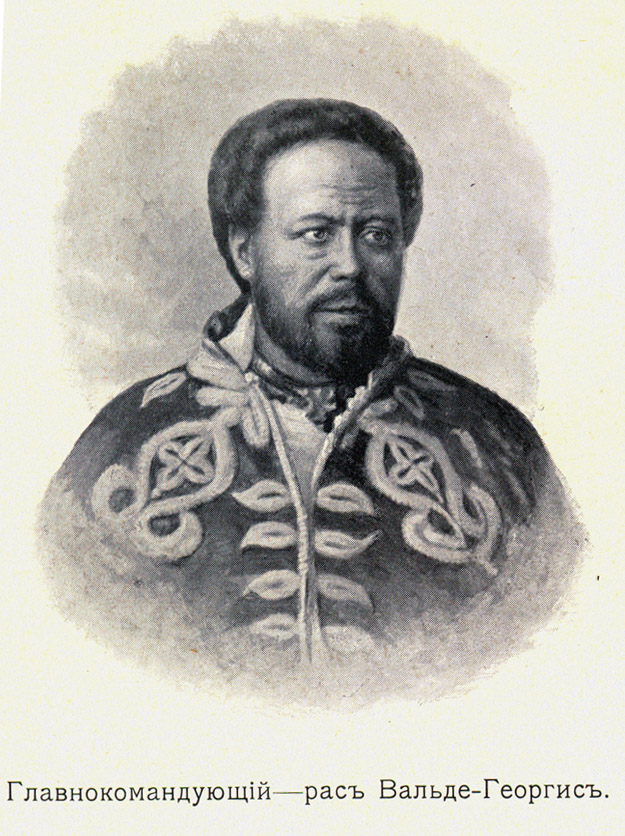
Ras Wolde Giorgis, who led the conquest of Konta in 1889–1893

Between 1889 and 1893, Däggazmač (later Ras) Wälda Giyorgis Abboyye, acting on behalf of Emperor Menelik II, incorporated Konta into the expanding Ethiopian Empire. The elderly King Hatsyo offered feeble resistance; his successor Sakallo was deposed after one year and died of smallpox. The following king, Lutse, was punished by the dismemberment of his territory.

The conquest had severe and lasting effects. Wars of resistance drastically reduced the adult male population, and the gabbär system—a form of state serfdom in which entire peasant communities were assigned to provide labour and tribute to soldiers, was imposed. The system operated through oppression and arbitrary exaction until it was abolished by the Italian administration in 1935.

== Kullo Konta: colonial and post‑colonial administration ==
After the conquest, the territory of the former kingdom was designated Kullo Konta (Ge'ez: ኩሎ፡ኮንታ), combining Kullo, a derogatory Amharic name for the Dawro, with Konta. It was placed under the governorate of the newly conquered province of Käfa. Ras Wälda Giyorgis, the first governor, used the area as a concentration point for his troops during the subsequent conquest of Käfa (1897). The Dawro under their king Ganza rebelled in 1896 but were defeated; groups of Dawro later served as irregulars in the Käfa campaign.

On the eve of the Second Italo-Ethiopian War, Kullo Konta was separated from Käfa. After the restoration of Ethiopian sovereignty in 1942, it became a woreda and later an awragga within Kaffa Province. By 1964 the awragga comprised eight woredas, with its capital at Waka.

In post‑1991 Ethiopia, the area was designated a special woreda of the Southern Nations, Nationalities, and Peoples' Region (SNNPR). Following a referendum in November 2021, it became part of the newly created South West Ethiopia Peoples' Region and is now the Konta Zone, with Ameya as its administrative centre.

== Demographics ==
The population of the Konta area was estimated at 49,625 in 1994 and 72,453 in 2002. The 2007 national census recorded 90,846 inhabitants, of whom 85.5% identified as Konta, 4.1% Chara, 3.8% Welayta, 2.2% Kaffa, and 1.1% Amhara. Religiously, 49.1% were Protestant, 43.7% Ethiopian Orthodox, and 4.7% followers of traditional beliefs—a marked shift from 1994, when traditional religion was the plurality (44.6%).

=== Traditional social hierarchy ===
Konta retains a caste‑like social stratification that is widespread in the region. At the top are the goqa ("farmers" or "citizens"), followed by artisan groups (potters, tanners, smiths, iron smelters), and at the bottom the manga, a group that depends on forest resources. These status groups have traditionally had differential access to political office, land, and social prestige.

== Economy ==
The economy of Konta remains predominantly agricultural, with cultivation of enset, potatoes, coffee, spices (e.g., cardamom), and cereals (e.g., teff). The area’s mountainous terrain makes it susceptible to soil erosion, and cash crops such as coffee and cardamom have been promoted by the regional government to increase household income.

== See also ==
- Konta Zone
- Menelik II's conquests
- Kingdom of Kaffa
- Kingdom of Wolaita
- Omotic languages
- Frobenius Institute
- Ethiopian Empire
