= Bashah Aboye =

Ethiopian General

Bashah Aboye (Note: Bashah Aboye in various sources also spelled as Bäšah Abboyye, Beshah Abboye) (born circa 1850 - died 1 March 1896) horse name: Abba Däffar, was a distinguished Ethiopian military commander under Emperor Menelik II, and governor of several former principalities and regions in the south. Bashah died fighting the Italians during the Battle of Adwa.

== Ancestry ==
Of Amhara descent, Bashah Aboye's was the eldest son of Woizero Ayahilush, a daughter of Negus Sahle Selassie of Shewa. His father was Meridazmach Aboye, who was appointed by Emperor Tewodros II as the imperial viceroy (governor) in Shewa. His father was further distinguished with the title of Afe Negus (lit: Mouth of the king) or Chief judge.

His brothers were Ras Welde Giyorgis Aboye of Gondar, Dejazmach Lemma Aboye. His sisters were Sama’etwa Aboye and Birkenseh Aboye (twins), and Wossen Yelesh Aboye.

He was a cousin of Emperor Menelik II.

== Biography ==
=== Earliest sources ===
Little is known about Bashah Aboye in other fields besides warfare. He appeared first in historical sources as a distinguished horse-man and skilled fighter in the clashes between the armies of Yohannes IV and Menelik II in 1877. A couplet of praise (misgana) was composed at the time, and it subsequently became almost synonymous with his name and has been mentioned in almost every source. Between 1872 and 1885 Menelik II, then Negus of Shewa, entrusted Bashah with the task of collecting tribute from areas south of Shewa.

=== Conquests and Governorship ===
In the 1880s he commanded a military division of his own and conquered the Gibe kingdom of Gera. In 1886 Bashah Aboye conquered the small kingdom of Gomma on behalf of Negus Menelik II. In October of that year, he was promoted to the rank of Dejazmach and appointed as governor of Gomma and Gera principalities with orders to pacify the region and collect taxes.

By the late 1880s Bashah also gained the governorship of Gurage and Hadiya.

=== Kaffa expeditions ===
Between 1885 and 1889, Bashah led several failed campaigns against the kingdom of Kaffa. (Note: One of these campaigns occurred in 1886, when Dejazmach Bashah Aboye invaded Kaffa and caused significant damage until he was defeated by the Kaffa army at Mera) In 1897, a year after Bashah's death, his younger brother Welde Giyorgis Aboye would become the conqueror that defeated the kingdom of Kaffa.

=== 1889-1891 Ethiopian famine, and Sidamo campaign ===
Between 1889 and 1891, in the midst of a devastating famine, Bashah Aboye was tasked with gathering provisions and tribute. In 1890 he led a failed military expedition into Sidamo, and had set up a base in Shisha (in Sidama). However, Bashah's Gurage foot soldiers were not well armed or provisioned, and he reportedly withdrew from Sidamo in 1891, after six months. In his absence, an insurrection was staged in Gomma and Gera with the assistance of the Welamo kingdom. Bashah Aboye had to put down the rebellion by force.

=== 1894 Welamo campaign ===
In 1894, Emperor Menelik II led the campaign against Welamo. Ras Darge Sahle Selassie and the Aboye brothers (Bashah and Welde Giyorgis) were his military commanders.

== Battle of Adwa, and death ==
Dejazmach Bashah Aboye alongside Ras Makonnen Wolde Mikael, Fitawrari Gebeyehu and the ‘Tabanĝā Yāž’ (Note: Tabanĝā Yāž was an army contingent fully equipped with firearms and under the command of the Turk Basha (commander of riflemen) or Ligābā.) led the central front of Emperor Menelik II army during the First Italo-Ethiopian War. Bashah is remembered for his valor at the battle of Adwa on 1 March 1896, during which he was mortally wounded and died. Favored by his soldiers, in retaliation for Bashah's death, his men executed 70 Italian prisoners of war in their custody.
