= Welde Giyorgis Aboye =

Ethiopian general (1851–1918)

Negus of Gondar and Ras Welde Giyorgis Aboye
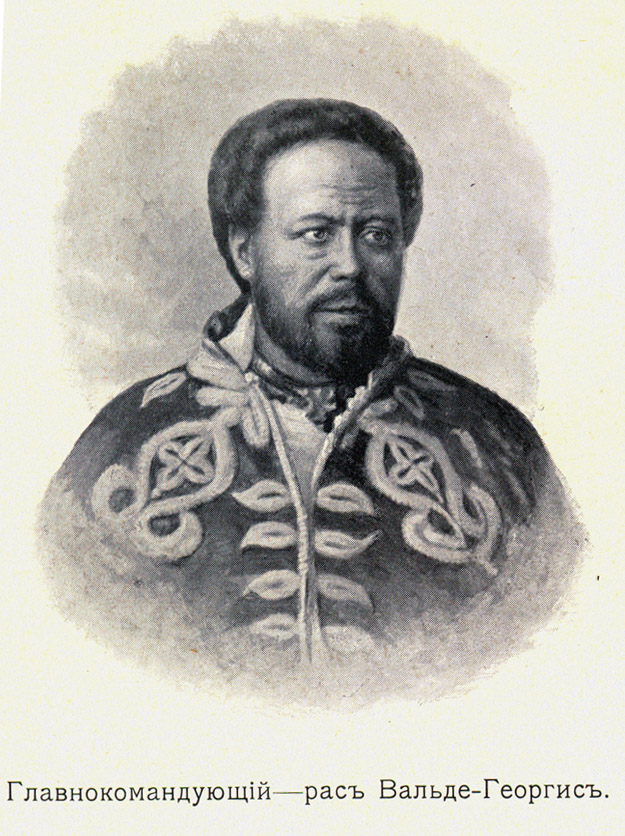
- Ras Welde Giyorgis, before 1900.
- Born: 4 November 1851; Menz, Shewa province, Ethiopian Empire
- Died: 1 March 1918 (aged 66); Debre Tabor, Begemder province, Ethiopian Empire
- Other names: in various sources spelled as: Oualdo Gorghis; Walda Giyorgis Abboye; Wäldä-Giyorgis Abboyyé; Welde Giyorgis Abboye; Wolda Giyorgis; Wolde Georgius; Wolde Giyorgis
- Citizenship: Ethiopian
- Occupations: Military commander, politician and provincial governor

Welde Giyorgis Aboye (horse name Abba Säggäd; 4 November 1851 – 1 March 1918) was one of the most prominent Ethiopian generals who spearheaded Emperor Menelik's southward expansion at the close of the 19th century. His fame soared after leading the conquest on the Kingdom of Kaffa as a Ras, and was subsequently appointed as provincial governor of that fief by the Emperor. Welde Giyorgis later became the governor of Begemder. A few months before his death, he was elevated to Negus, (lit: King) of Gondar by Empress Zewditu in 1917, as recognition for his role in deposing Lij Iyasu.

== Ancestry ==
Of Amhara descent. Welde Giyorgis was the second son of Woizero Ayahilush, a daughter of Negus Sahle Selassie of Shewa. His father was Meridazmach Aboye, who was appointed by Emperor Tewodros II as the imperial viceroy (governor) in Shewa. His father was further distinguished with the title of Afe Negus (lit: ‘‘Mouth of the king’’) or chief of judges.

His full siblings were; brothers Ras Bashah Aboye and Dejazmach Lemma Aboye, and his sisters Wossen Yelesh Aboye and twins Sama'etwa Aboye and Birkenseh Aboye.

He was a cousin of Emperor Menelik II.

== Biography ==
=== Early career ===
As a youngster, Welde Giyorgis started service in Negus Menelik's court as a page and rose through the ranks to become chief of the personal guard of the Negus with the title of grazmach in 1883.

=== Southwestern conquests ===
In 1885 Welde Giyorgis participated in the conquest on the kingdom of Yamma. In 1886, he assisted Tessema Nadew in defeating the Gumma resistance, and was promoted in April that year to the rank of Dejazmach after establishing himself as a skilled soldier. His first region to govern was Limu, there he demonstrated his military leadership and from that area led a series of successful military campaigns. In 1889 he conquered the small kingdoms of Dawro, (Note: Prior to Welde Giyorgis's conquest, Dawro was a tributary vassal of the kingdom of Kaffa.) Konta, and Koysha in southwestern Ethiopia. He was promoted to the rank of Ras in 1893, and alongside Menelik II conquered the Kingdom of Wolaita in 1894.

=== Battle of Adwa and submission of Aussa ===
During the course of the First Italo-Ethiopian War in 1895-1896, forces commandeerd by Welde Giyorgis, Tessema Nadew and Welde Tsadiq were assigned to neutralize the Afar people and prevent them from helping the Italians. The show of Abyssinian force dissuaded the Afar sultan Mahammad Hanfare of the Sultanate of Aussa from honouring his treaties with Italy, and instead Hanfare secured a modicum of autonomy within the Ethiopian Empire by accepting Menelik's indirect rule after the war.

=== Conquest of Kaffa ===
Earlier expeditions led by Ras Gobana Dacche in 1882, Bashah Aboye between 1885-1889 and other officers in 1890 failed, however the Kingdom of Konta bordering Kaffa was subjugated in 1889. Kaffa's leaders, Gali and Gaki pretended to submit to Menelik II, only to refuse to pay the annual tribute.

In January 1897 Emperor Menelik II dispatched three armies (under Ras Welde Giyorgis's command) to areas of modern day southwest Ethiopia that wasn't under his rule at that time. Menelik wanted to bring Amhara civilization to the ‘‘benighted’’ (to the non-Christian population) of the resource rich area of Kaffa and beyond.

Welde Giyorgis was at the head of thirty-one thousand soldiers, leading the bloody campaign against the Kingdom of Kaffa. Fifteen thousand soldiers were directly under Ras Welde Giyorgis, half of whom where equipped with guns. Dejazmach Demissew Nasibu (Note: The army under dejazmach Demissew conquered Sidamo and Konso by April 1897.) led eight thousand men, half of them with guns; and eight thousand men, almost all with guns were led by Dejazmach Tessema Nadew (Note: Dejazmach Tessema Nadew was assigned to guide the French under Charles de Bonchamps to the Nile.). The Kaffans bode strong resistance under its last king Gaki Sherocho, even after the fall of Andaraca, his kingdom's capital, in March 1897. Gaki ordered (in vain) the destruction of grain and houses, so that it would hamper the Amhara forces to sustain themselves. The Kaffan leader was captured in September 1897, and presented to Emperor Menelik two months later in silver chains. Kaffa was incorporated into the Ethiopian Empire, and Welde Giyorgis was appointed as governor.

=== Counter British and French encroachment ===
Welde Giyorgis on the cover of the French newspaper "Journal des voyages et des aventures de terre et de mer" (1902)

Before formally assuming his new position as governor of Kaffa, Welde Giyorgis was ordered by Emperor Menelik to participate in an expanded expedition along the southern and south-western border areas to preempt British and French colonial ambitions in that direction. Ras Welde Giyorgis was instructed to advance from Kaffa into the south annexing all lands that lay along the way to the 2nd north meridian and establish a foothold at Lake Turkana.

On 29 March 1898, Welde Giyorgis planted the Ethiopian flag on both of Lake Turkana's shores.

=== Governor of Kaffa ===
In contrast to his successors after 1910, Welde Giyorgis administration (r. 1897–1910) was considered as moderate and just. Kaffa's economy was revived through agriculture, cattle rearing and trade. Welde Giyorgis had taken control of the coffee trade and forced the caravans taking the Gojjam-Metema route to go through Shewa where Menelik could collect taxes and Welde Giyorgis could take his share.

In 1902 and 1907, Welde Giyorgis was the informed negotiator with the British on the borderlines drawn between his lands and the Sudan and Kenya respectively.

In November 1903, an American mission led by Robert Peet Skinner successfully established formal trade ties with Abyssinia after audience with Emperor Menelik II. Welde Giyorgis hosted the American mission in December.

A dobe wall, such as they build in Mexico, surrounded the large park, which was subdivided into numerous compounds. In the central compound stood the palace. The palace was probably 100 feet long by 80 feet wide, one story high, and divided into two rooms. The external walls were made of sun-dried bricks, such as we saw in process of manufacture as we approached from the Guebi (Note: Guebi also spelled as Gebbi means compound or enclosure.)...Our palace was oval in shape. There were several large doors and two windows in each room. The window had solid wooden shutters, but no galls. Upon the floor were laid numerous Oriental rugs, and in the front room was a divan, or throne, a long table, and many chairs. Portraits of the Emperor and of the Patriach of Alexandria were upon the walls. After our tent life it all seemed quite sumptous. — Robert Peet Skinner account of visit to Welde Giyorgis's compound, and description of the palace.,

A telephone line connecting Kaffa and Gore to Addis Ababa was completed in 1905.

=== Menelik's health and chaos in the government ===
Emperor Menelik's health deterioration since 1906 led to increasing rivalries in the government. Empress Taytu asserted her authority by undermining the crown council of ministers. (Note: Emperor Menelik II established the crown council in 1908, composed of his appointed ministers and certain great chiefs to handle governmental affairs.) The Shewan faction running the daily governance was frustrated by the decisions of Empress Taytu, after she maneuvered her own candidates into positions of power. Welde Giyorgis with an army of thirty thousand men under his command did not commit himself to the Empress or the Shewan establishment, rather he ignored to obey orders or to answer letters from the central government.

Welde Giyorgis's loyalty lay with his king. In 1908 he accompanied Emperor Menelik II to the monastery of Debre Libanos for holy water and prayer. Menelik suffered two strokes prior, and having been disappointed with European medicine, the ailing Emperor put his faith to God.

Welde Giyorgis joined the Bank of Abyssinia as governor, and spent a year in the capital Addis Ababa. He left in June 1909 back to Kaffa.

=== Governor of northwest Ethiopia ===
By April 1910 Empress Taytu's faction lost the internal power struggle, and the crown council led by Ras-Bitwoded Tessema Nadew successfully limited the queen's powers. The government then moved to purge Taytu loyalists who owed their stations to her. On 5 May 1910 Welde Giyorgis a spectator to these events was promoted by a surprise decree to govern Begemder including Dembiya and Semien from the headquarters in Gondar in northern Ethiopia.

The new political realignment has cost Taytu's nephew, Ras Gugsa Welle (Note: Gugsa Welle was the son of Welle Betul, a brother of Empress Taytu Betul) rulership over Begemder. However, not without a fight. In June before Welde Giyorgis consolidated his administration in the north, Gugsa defeated the small army of the Tigrayan Dejazmach Gebre Selassie on June 11. Fruitless talks were held during the rainy season, during which Gugsa Welle strategic position deteriorated daily as Welde Giyorgis pacified Begemder and obtained the submission of many of Gugsa's lieutenants.

=== Lij Iyasu fears, and enmity with Ras Mikael ===
Rumours have been floating prior to Tessema's death in April 1911, that Welde Giyorgis was the prime candidate to succeed him as regent. However, the designated heir Lij Iyasu emerged as the regent with some conditions from the crown council. The young regent antagonized the council of ministers and provincial leaders by removing or curbing powers of some of the prominent figures. Lij Iyasu's growing list of enemies couldn't unify on who to replace him with. (Note: The American representative, Guy Love, even reported that there was talk in Shewa of creating a republic ‘‘with Ras Wolde Georgius as president with a new parliament from all of the provinces in the country’’.) Welde Giyorgis wasn't in favour of a coup at that time.

Upon the death of his majesty Menelik II, the leading men of Ethiopia gathered in Addis Abeba by 10 January 1914. All eyes were on Ras Welde Giyorgis whether he showed ambitions to march on the capital to take the crown. Lij Iyasu's father Ras Mikael was waiting with a strong force at Were Ilu to head off his army. The crown council of ministers indefinitely delayed Lij Iyasu's coronation (Note: Lij Iyasu would never be crowned Emperor, and remained as Regent and designated heir until he was deposed in 1916.). The ministers did agree on the regent's proposal to crown his father Ras Mikael as Negus of the North, and authorizing Mikael's use of the title ‘‘Ras of Rases’’. This honour irrated Welde Giyorgis.

In the aftermath of a Tigrayan rebellion in February 1914, the defeated fugitive Dejazmach Gebre-Selassie fled his pursuers (Note: The rebel Dejazmach Gebre-Selassie lost in a pitched battle against Dejazmach Seyoum Mengesha, but nevertheless escaped. Welde Giyorgis with a thirty thousand strong army entered Tigray to pursue the rebel. Welde Giyorgis was embarrassed by this rebellion, Gebre-Selassie was married to his niece Amaretch. Realizing that he was outnumbered by the forces of Welde Giyorgis who had advanced as far as Aksum, Gebre-Selassie fled into the Danakil desert.). Lij Iyasu's government ordered Welde Giyorgis to halt his advances into Tigray, and after report of apparent refusal, the government ordered several generals into state of readiness. Lij Iyasu's government held an excessive and baseless fear that Ras Welde Giyorgis would rally dissident Tigrayans and forment a major rebellion. The government may have also feared a military confrontation between Welde Giyorgis and Ras Mikael, whom between them had been enmity for some time. An immense amount of resources had been assembled for a rebellion that didn't exist, and to protect the government from illusory and contrived nightmare of a revolt by Ras Welde Giorgis.

On 31 May 1914, at Dessie, Ras Mikael was crowned Negus of Wollo and Tigray by Abuna Petros. The title Negus of the North was dropped, nor was he designated as King of Begemder; an indication that Lij Iyasu's government still respected the political and military potency of Welde Giyorgis.

=== Deposing Lij Iyasu ===
On 27 September 1916 the Shewan establishment issued a proclamation that deposed Lij Iyasu for committing apostasy and treason, following his conversion to Islam. Lij Iyasu's army was defeated at the battle of Mieso against forces led by Tekle Hawariat Tekle Mariyam. Ras Mikael lost in the battle of Segale while Welde Giyorgis occupied Dessie.

=== Negus of Gondar ===
In March 1917, for his accomplishments and loyalty, he was crowned King of Gondar by Empress Zewditu of Ethiopia, the daughter of his late cousin, Emperor Menelik II.

== Legacy ==
=== Spouses ===
He was first married to a relative of Bafena. Welde Giyorgis then married Yeshimebet Sabagadis. (Note: also spelled in various sources as Yeshemabet) Yeshimebet's father was the Irob warlord Sabagadis Woldu, former ruler of the Tigray province. Her mother Yewub-dar Haile Maryam was the daughter of the Amhara chief Haile Maryam Gebre, the former governor of Semien province and Hirut Gugsa. Yeshimebet was also the niece of Wube Haile Maryam, and an older cousin of Empress Taytu Betul.

The Russian officer Alexander Bulatovich spent four months in the company of Welde Giyorgis (after introduction to the family of Welde Giyorgis) noted that Yeshimebet was ″adored by her husband and that they have been united by the rite of religious marriage, after many years of a civil arrangement″.

=== Descendants ===
Welde Giyorgis and Yeshimebet had two sons (Alemayehu Welde Giyorgis and Gebre Maryam Welde Giyorgis) and one daughter Worqenesh Welde Giyorgis.
