= Horse name =

Secondary royal title of the Ethiopian Empire nobles

A horse name is a secondary noble title or a popular name for members of Ethiopian royalty; in some cases the "horse names" are the only name known for a ruler. They take the form of "father of X", where "X" is the name of the person's warhorse. According to Mahtama Sellase "They were given to a man for “his good administration, judgment and council in times of peace and his bravery and strategy in times of war” The first named horse in the region's history was that of Amda Seyon I in his royal chronicle "The Glorious Victories." This would set the groundwork for the Horse name in Pre-Modern Ethiopia

Some known horse names of Ethiopian nobility include:

List of Horse names
Name	Title	Horse Name	Literal/Synonymous meaning	Note	Sources
Alula Engida	Ras	Abba Nega	Father of dawn	Alula Aba Nega Airport is named after him and his horsename.	
Balcha Safo	Dejazmach	Abba Nefso	Father of the Soul		
Bashah Aboye	Dejazmach	Abba Däffar	Father of audacity		
Belay Zeleke	Dejazmach	Abba Koster	Father of Sharpshooter		
Darge Sahle Selassie	Ras	Abba Gersa (Note: also spelled as Abba Girsha)	Father of Recurring Impediment (i.e. impeding the enemy).		
Garmame	Dejazmach	Abba Mala			
Habte Giyorgis Dinagde	Fitawrari	Abba Mechal	Father of Tolerance		
Haile Maryam Gebre	Dejazmach	Abba Dammana	Father of the Cloud		
Lul Seged	Ras	Abba Balay			
Menelik II	Emperor of Ethiopia	Abba Dagnew	Father of Justice		
Sabagadis Woldu	Dejazmach	Abba Garay			
Tekle Haymanot	Negus of Gojjam	Abba Tanna			
Tessema Nadew	Ras Bitwoded	Abba Qamaw			
Tewodros II	Emperor of Ethiopia	Abba Tatek	Father of readiness (of arms)		
Welde Giyorgis Aboye	Negus of Gondar	Abba Saggad (Note: also spelled as Abba Segud)	Father of Commandeering		
Yohannes IV	Emperor of Ethiopia	Abba Bezibiz	Father of Plunder		

== Bibliography ==
- Girma, Hewan. "Amharic Names, Naming Ceremonies and Memory." In Naming Africans: On the Epistemic Value of Names, pp. 37-59. Cham, Switzerland: Springer International Publishing, 2023.
- Mehari, Krista. 2007. Throne names, pen names, horse names, and field names: A look at the significance of name change in the Ethiopian political sphere.
- Pankhurst, Richard. 1989. The Early History of Ethiopian Horse-Names. Paideuma 35, pp. 197–206.
- Mahatama-Sellasie Walda-Masqal. 1969. A Study of the Ethiopian Culture of Horse Names. Journal of Ethiopian Studies Vol. 7, No. 2, pp
