= Anderaccha =

Town in southwestern Ethiopia

Coordinates: 7°12′N 36°17′E

Anderaccha is a town in southwestern Ethiopia. Located in the Keffa Zone of the Southern Nations, Nationalities and Peoples Region, at the confluence of the Guma River with the Gichey, it is 1,629 meters (5,344 ft) above sea level. The Central Statistical Agency has not published an estimate for its 2005 population.

== History ==
Anderaccha was one of the capitals of the Kingdom of Kaffa. The Russian officer Alexander Bulatovich notes that after the kingdom's conquest, but before his arrival, the royal palace had been burned down by the victorious Abyssinians.

On 2 February 1898, Ras Wolde Giyorgis, accompanied by the Russian officer Alexander Bulatovich marched at the head of an army of 16,000 men from this town for an expedition to the south. According to Richard Pankhurst, Anderaccha in the early 20th century was one of the major marketplaces of the Kaffa area, the other three being Bonga and Sharada. The market was held there four times a week, with upwards of 5,000 people attending. In 1905 the trading firm of Mohammedally opened a branch occupied in the export of coffee import of manufactured goods; the rubber export firm Regie co-interessee du Caoutchoc also maintained an office in Anderaccha.
