= Gojeb River =

Tributary of the Omo River in Ethiopia

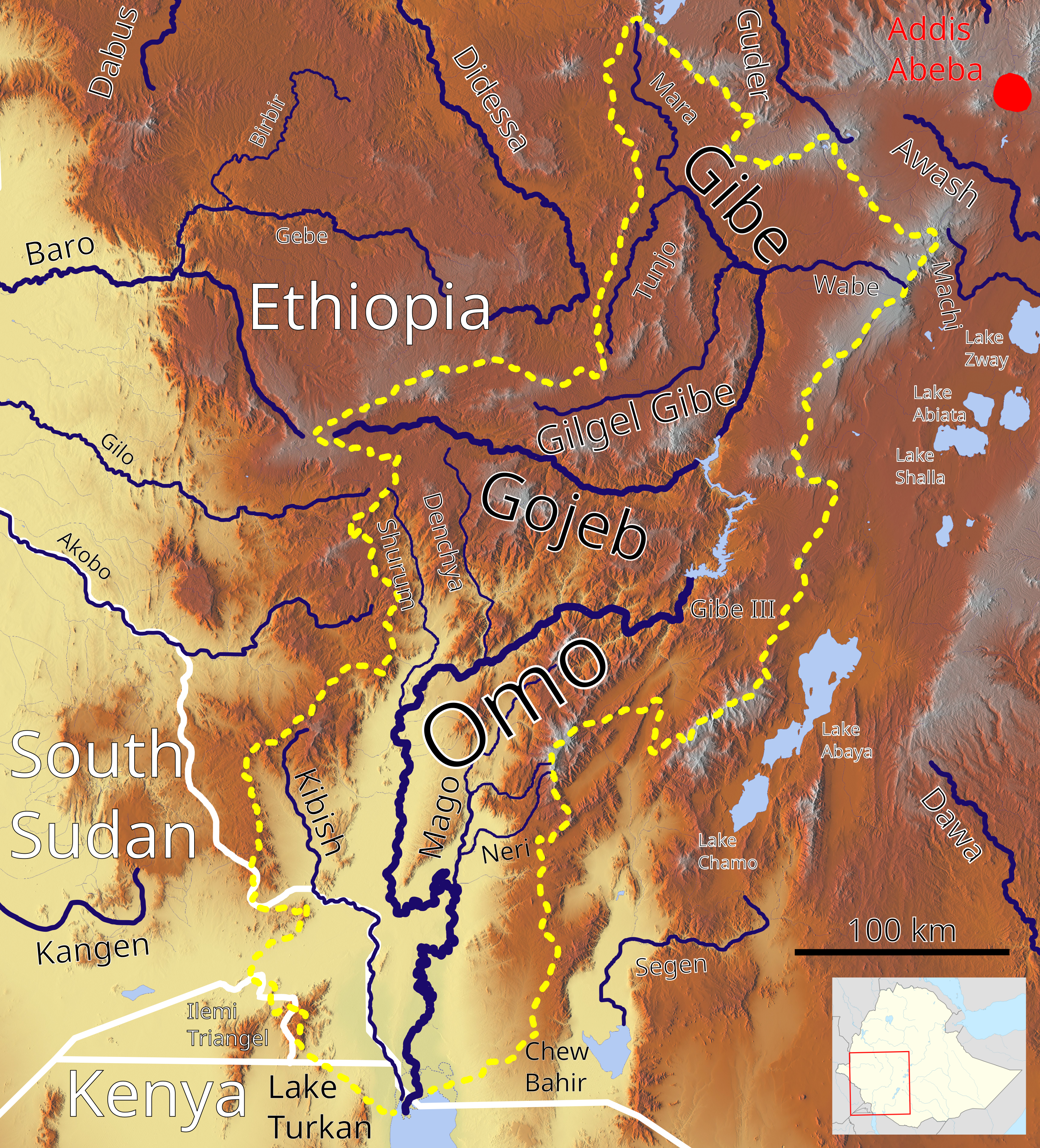
The Omo Basin

The Gojeb River is an eastward-flowing tributary of the Omo River in Ethiopia. It rises in the mountains of Guma, flowing in almost a direct line its confluence with the Omo at 7°20′25″N 37°21′17″E.

Its canyon provided the former Kingdom of Kaffa an important defensive frontier, as described by Mohammed Hassan:

The hot valley of the Gojeb, infested with both terrible mosquitos and tsetse flies, covered with tall grass and dense forest, made rapid cavalry attack and retreat virtually impossible. This natural protection ... was further strengthened by elaborate and highly complex man-made fortifications which protected all the entrances to that country.

— Mohammed Hassan, The Oromo of Ethiopia: a History 1570-1860 (1994)

Because of its location between the two kingdoms, Alexander Bulatovich, who crossed the river in January 1897, reported its valley was uninhabited, yet "abounds in wild goats and antelopes. Leopards and lions are encountered here. Larger animals, such as elephants and rhinoceroses, stay lower on the river's course, near to where the Gojeb flows into the Omo."

The Gojeb is the location of the Gojeb Dam, Ethiopia's first Independent Power Project. This 150-MW hydroelectric plant started commercial operation in 2004. The project was developed by Mohammed International Development Research Organization and Companies (MIDROC), which intends to sell the output to the Ethiopian Electric Power Corporation.

== See also ==
- List of Ethiopian rivers
