= Tessema Nadew =

Ethiopian military commander

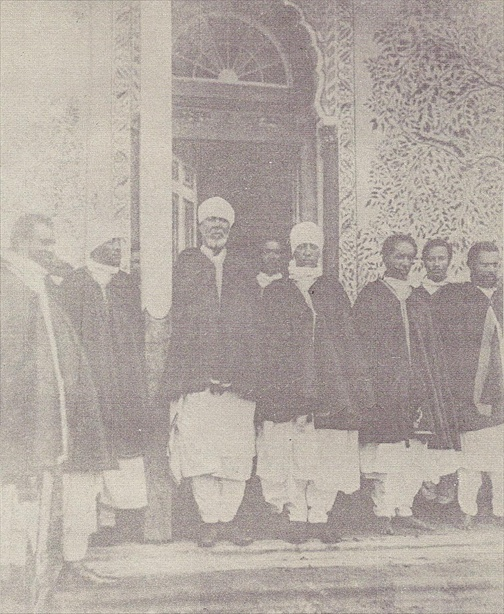
Ras Bitwoded Tessema (third from the left) with several other senior members of the Ethiopian aristocracy and Menelik's government, namely (from left to right): 1. Negadras Yigezu Behabte; 2. Fitawrari Habte Giyorgis Dinagde; 3. Ras Bitwoded Tessema; 4. Negadras Haile Giyorgis Woldemikael; 5. Lij Iyasu; 6. Wagshum Kebede Tafari; 7. Leul Dejazmatch Haile Selassie Gugsa; 8. Dejazmach Gebreselassie Bariagaber

Ras Bitwoded Tessema Nadew (died 10 April 1911; horse name Abba Qamaw) was an Ethiopian military officer and politician who on 28 October 1909 was proclaimed as Ethiopia's future Balemulu Enderase (Regent Plenipotentiary) (Note: Bālemulu literally means "fully empowered" or "wholly authorised", thus distinguishing it from the general use of Enderase, that being a representative or lieutenant of the Emperor to fiefs or vassals, essentially a Governor-General or Viceroy, by which term provincial governors in the late Imperial period were referred.)) to Lij Iyasu, upon the latter's appointment as heir to the throne by Emperor Menelik II. He died in 1911, predeceasing Menelik and thus never assuming that office. He previously served as governor of Illubabor Province, the campaign of re-conquest for which he had led and fought in the Battle of Adwa.

== Ancestry ==
Of Amhara descent Tessema Nadew was the son of Ato (Mister) Nadew Abba Baher and Woyzero (Madame) Qonjit Debneh. His father, Nadew Abba Baher, was Menelik II’s tutor as well as the commander in chief of Menelik’s army in the 1870s. Nadew was made Dejazmach in 1878, and he was one of the leading royal counselors until his death in late 1886. Because of his father’s distinguished career, Tessema (a scion of Shoan nobility and a cousin of Emperor Menelik II) was eased into a favored position at Menelik’s court, and later became an advisor and close friend of his majesty.

== Military and administrative career ==
=== Governor of Guma and Illubabor ===
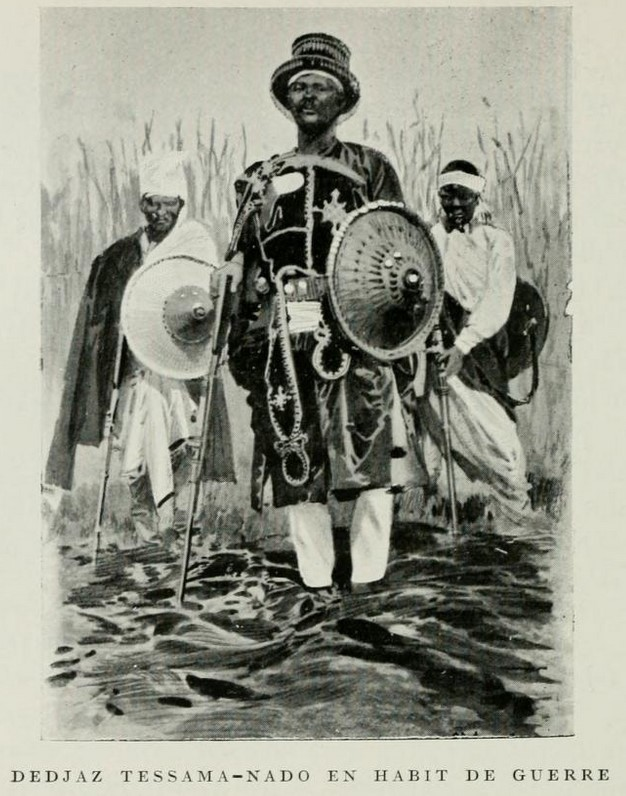
Tessema Nadew in 1897–8

Tessema Nadew was made governor, or Shum of the defunct kingdoms of Gumma and Illubabor in 1886. He conquered the small kingdom of Guma in 1886 and executed its leader Abba Fogi, Abba Fogi's son and heir, Firrisaa managed to flee.

Tessema Nadew faced resistance in Illubabor by the local Oromo ruler, or Moti, Fatansa Illu, who refused to continue vassalage nor pay tributes, and ceased to recognize Tessema's authority as an imperial overseer. Fatansa appealed in vain to Kumsa Mereda of Leqa Nekemte and Abba Jifar II of Jimma (who both by that time had accepted Ethiopian suzerainty over their lands) for assistance, as his forces' shields and spears were no match for the imperial army, which was well armed with modern firearms. Tessema Nadew led the re-conquest of Illubabor in 1889, defeated Fatansa Illu's forces, and permanently ended Illubabor autonomy.

=== Battle of Adwa and submission of Aussa ===
A noted warrior, he fought in the Battle of Adwa in 1896, Tessema was also assigned together with other generals to neutralize the Afar people and prevent them from helping the Italians during the course of the First Italo-Ethiopian War in 1895–1896. The show of Abyssinian force dissuaded the Afar sultan Mahammad Hanfare of the Sultanate of Aussa from honouring his treaties with Italy, and instead Hanfare secured a modicum of autonomy within the Ethiopian Empire by accepting Menelik's indirect rule after the war.

=== Conquest of Kaffa and Aari ===
Immediately after Ethiopia’s victory over Italy at the Battle of Adwa, Tesemma participated in the nine-month campaign to subdue the Kingdom of Kafa. Kafa was finally annexed in 1897.

In 1897, Dejazmach Tessema Nadew with two thousand cavalary and infantry under his command, led the first wave in the campaign against the Baaka, a sub-group of the Aari people. The Imperial Ethiopian army approached the Baaka by beating the ceremonial drum negarit. The Baaka on their part blew their horn trumpets shoora and prepared themselves to confront Tessema's army. Conflict began under the beats of the war drum and blowing of horns. The Baaka warriors fought the army of Tesemma in three battles. The first battle was around Boshkoro in Maaleland. The second battle took place around Waati (what was later to be a customs check point known locally as kella). The third fighting took place in Bakko (then known as Adir). The Aari lost all three of these battles.

=== Fashoda ===
In March 1898, on Menelik’s orders, Tessema led a large Ethiopian army (with a Russian contingent) from his base in Gore, Illubabor, to join the French soldier Major Jean-Baptiste Marchand at Fashoda in the Sudan. It was, however, not Menelik’s intention to assist the French against the British during the Fashoda incident between the two European powers. Menelik’s aim was largely to claim the territories in the Sudanese borderlands for Ethiopia. However, because of disease in the Nile Valley lowlands, Tessema’s army was forced to return to Gore in May before meeting with Marchand in Fashoda. He made, however, Fitawrari Haylu with eight hundred men and three Europeans move further to the confluence of the White Nile and the Sobat rivers, where they planted Ethiopian and French flags.

=== Bank of Abyssinia ===
In 1900 Tesemma was promoted from Dejazmach to Ras. After 1900, he spent most of his time as advisor to the board of governors of the Bank of Abyssinia, which opened in 1905.

== Regency ==
In October 1909 he was made Ras Bitwoded (Noble title equal to Earl – Ras being the highest rank) and regent to Lij Iyasu, Menelik’s designated heir. The new regent-designate found his authority undermined by Empress Taytu who tried to manipulate power and consolidate her own position while paralyzed Emperor Menelik was still alive. The Empress insisted that questions from the foreign legations in Addis Ababa be directed to her, not to the regent Tessema. Furthermore, Tessema himself suffered from an illness, which left him appearing helpless and apathetic and would take his life within a year. It took a coup d'état engineered by a group of aristocrats and the head of the Imperial Bodyguard to convince Ras Tesemma and Habte Giyorgis to decisively limit the influence of the Empress by forcing her resignation in March 1910. Despite these developments, the imperial government continued to falter: administrators were unwilling to make decisions because Tessema himself might be overthrown, and foreign affairs likewise suffered. Despite this, Harold Marcus notes that the presence of Tessema "did curb ministerial dissensions and intrigues and was a reminder of the existence of central authority."

== Legacy ==
On 10 April 1911, Tessema Nadew died. Shortly after midnight on 11 April Tessema's body was taken to Debre Libanos for immediate burial. Lij Iyasu maneuvered himself in the position of regent.

His son Dejazmach Kebede Tessema succeeded him as Governor, or Shum of Illubabor in 1909, after Tessema became regent.
