= Dawro =

Dawro or Dawuro may refer to:

- Dawro people, an ethnic group in southwestern Ethiopia
- Dawro Zone, a zone in the South West Ethiopia Peoples' Region
- Gamo-Gofa-Dawro language, an Omoto dialect continuum spoken in Ethiopia

== See also ==
- Dawaro, a Muslim principality near Hadiya, Africa
