= Kingdom of Kaffa =

1390–1897 kingdom in southern Ethiopia

Coordinates: 7.27°N 36.24°E

- c.1390–1897
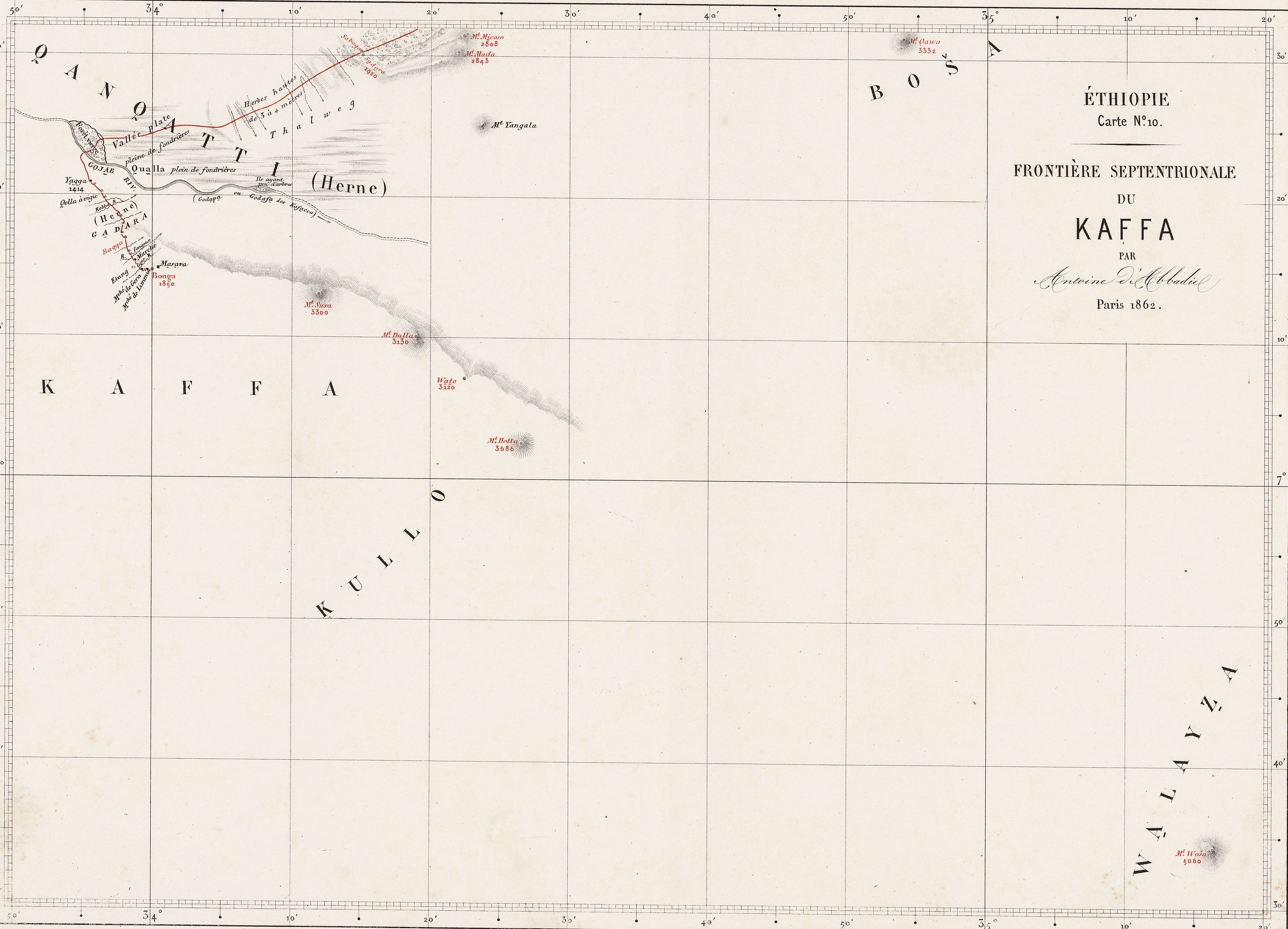
- Map of Kaffa in 1870 by Antoine Thomson d'Abbadie
- Capital: Bonga, Anderaccha
- Common languages: Kafa
- Religion: Officially Christianity (primarily Miaphysite Christianity, with a Catholic minority after 1855), Islam (introduced by traders in the 16th century, known locally as nagade gibind, "religion of the traders"), Paganism
- Government: Monarchy
- Monarch
  - c.1390: "The Minjo king"
  - c.1425: Girra
  - c.1460: "The Addio king"
  - c.1495: "The Sadda king"
  - c.1530: Madi Gafo
  - c.1565: "The Bonga king"
  - c.1605: Giba Neçoço
  - c.1640: Gali Gafoço
  - c.1675: Gali Ginoço
  - c.1710: Gaki Gaoço
  - 1742–1775: Gali Gaoco
  - 1775–1795: Sagi Seroco
  - 1795–1798: Besi Ginoco
  - 1798–1821: Hotti Ginoco
  - 1821–1845: Gaha Nerosso
- Historical era: Middle Ages to Early modern period
  - Established: c.1390
  - Annexed by Ethiopian Empire: 1897
Preceded by	Succeeded by
Mato dynasty	Ethiopian Empire
- Today part of: Ethiopia

- People: Kafficho
- Language: Kaffinono
- Country: Kingdom of Kaffa

The Kingdom of Kaffa existed from 1390 to 1897 in what is today Ethiopia, with its first capital at Bonga. It was bounded to the north by the Gojeb River, beyond which lay the Gibe kingdoms; to the east by the territory of the Konta and Kullo peoples and, beyond, the Omo River; to the south by numerous subgroups of the Gimira people; and to the west by the Majangir people. The native language, also known as Kaffa, is one of the Omotic group of languages.

Kaffa was divided into four subgroups that spoke a common language, Kefficho, one of the Gonga/Kefoid group of Omotic languages. The kingdom was also home to groups of foreigners, Ethiopian Muslim traders, and members of the Ethiopian Church. A number of socioeconomic groups, "but with the status of submerged status", existed; these included the manjo (hunters), manne (leatherworkers), and qemmo (blacksmiths). The manjo had their own king, appointed by the King of Kaffa, and were given the duties of guarding the royal compounds and the gates of the kingdom. The kingdom was overrun and conquered in 1897, and it was eventually annexed by the Ethiopian Empire.

This former kingdom lay in the southern parts of the Ethiopian Highlands with stretches of forest. The mountainous land is very fertile, capable of three harvests a year.

== History ==
=== Foundation ===
The Kingdom of Kaffa was founded c.1390 by Minjo, who according to oral tradition ousted the Mato dynasty of 32 kings. However, his informants told Amnon Orent, "no one remembers the name of a single one." The first capital, Bonga, was either founded or captured by Bon-noghe; it was later replaced by Anderaccha, but Bonga retained its importance.

=== Conversion to Christianity ===
During the 16th century, the Emperor of Abyssinia Sarsa Dengel convinced the kingdom to officially accept Christianity as its state religion. As a result, the church of St. George was dedicated at Baha; the building preserved a tabot bearing the name of Emperor Sarsa Dengel. Over the following centuries, the influence of the Abyssinian king weakened and Christianity more or less disappeared, although the church of St. George was used as a "male house of ritual of George" until late in the 19th century when Christian practices were reintroduced.

=== Wars of expansion ===
Beginning with Gali Ginocho (1675–1710), the kings of Kaffa began to expand the borders of their kingdom, annexing the neighboring small Gimira states of She, Benesho, and Majango. The neighboring state of the Welayta and the Konta came under their control in the reign of Tato Shagi Sherocho (1775–1795), who extended the boundaries of his kingdom as far as the Omo to the southeast and almost to the confluence of the Omo and the Denchya to the south. During the reign of King Hoti Gaocho (1798–1821), the territory of the Kaffa kings reached its maximum. According to Orent, the traditions of the Kaffa people relate that he ruled far and wide, conquering wherever he went, even as far afield as Wolleta and Kambaata. Orent concludes, "To this day, some people still talk about the time that their ancestors defeated all their enemies and sat at the foot of a famous tree in Wolliso and decided not to go farther into Shewa province."

=== Oromo invasion ===
Around the 18th century, the kingdom was invaded by the Mecha Oromos. Although Kaffa could repel the invasion because of its difficult terrain, all territories north of the Gojeb River were lost to the Oromos.

=== Shewan invasion ===
The last Kaffa king, Gaki Sherocho, resisted for months against the combined armies of Welde Giyorgis Aboye, Ras Damisse, and King Abba Jifar II of Jimma; he was captured on 11 September 1897, and he was first sent to Ankober, and then to Addis Ababa. Kaffa was then held as a fief by Wolde Giyogis until 1914. The last Kaffa king had defeated two Amhara invasions of his kingdom in 1890 and 1893; however, Menelik had amassed many more guns. It was believed that the Amhara won because of their superior firepower, whereas the Kaffa were still armed with spears.

During his visit to Kaffa in 1897, Alexander Bulatovich had the opportunity to study the culture of the inhabitants, describing them in his book With the Armies of Menelik II, emperor of Ethiopia, identifying a number of practices in common with the more familiar Amhara people. After the annexation into Ethiopia, the inhabitants suffered greatly because of the slave-raids organized by Abba Jifar II, and the region almost became uninhabited. During the reorganization of the provinces in 1942, the former kingdom was enlarged by the addition of a number of other kingdoms from the Gibe region to become Kaffa Province.

== Economy ==
As late as 1905 in Kaffa, Maria Theresa thalers (MT) and salt blocks called amoleh were used as currency (as in the rest of Ethiopia), which circulated at a rate of four or five amolehs to 1 MT.

The economy was based on exports of gold, civet oil, and slaves. Crops grown included coffee and cotton. However, according to Richard Pankhurst, the amount of coffee exported was never large: he cites an estimate for its production in the 1880s at 50,000 to 60,000 kilograms per year. Livestock was raised, and honeybees were kept in barrels (called gendo) hung in trees.

== Gallery ==
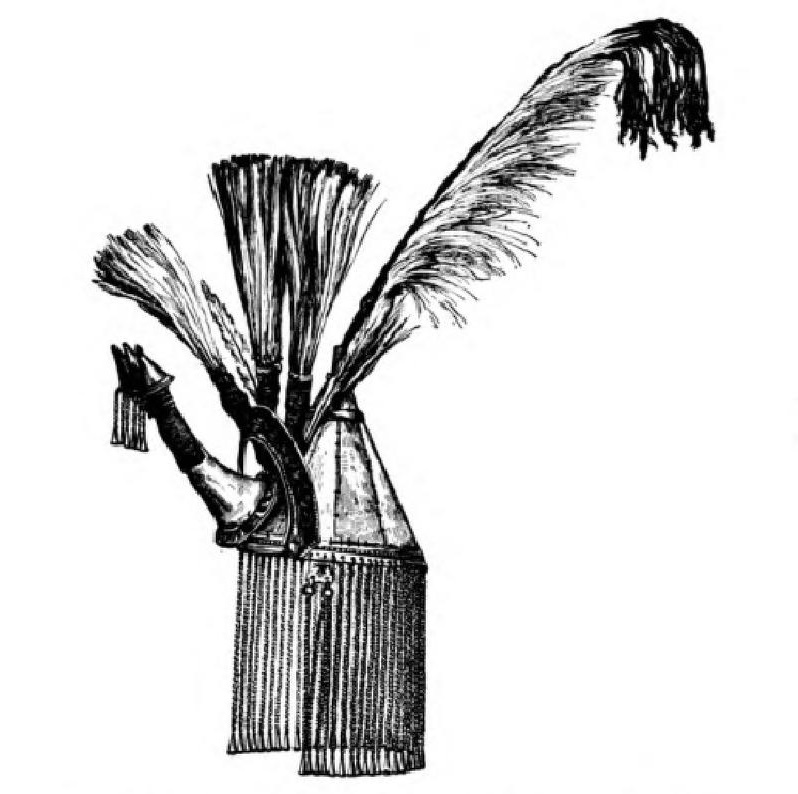
Crown of the kings of Kaffa

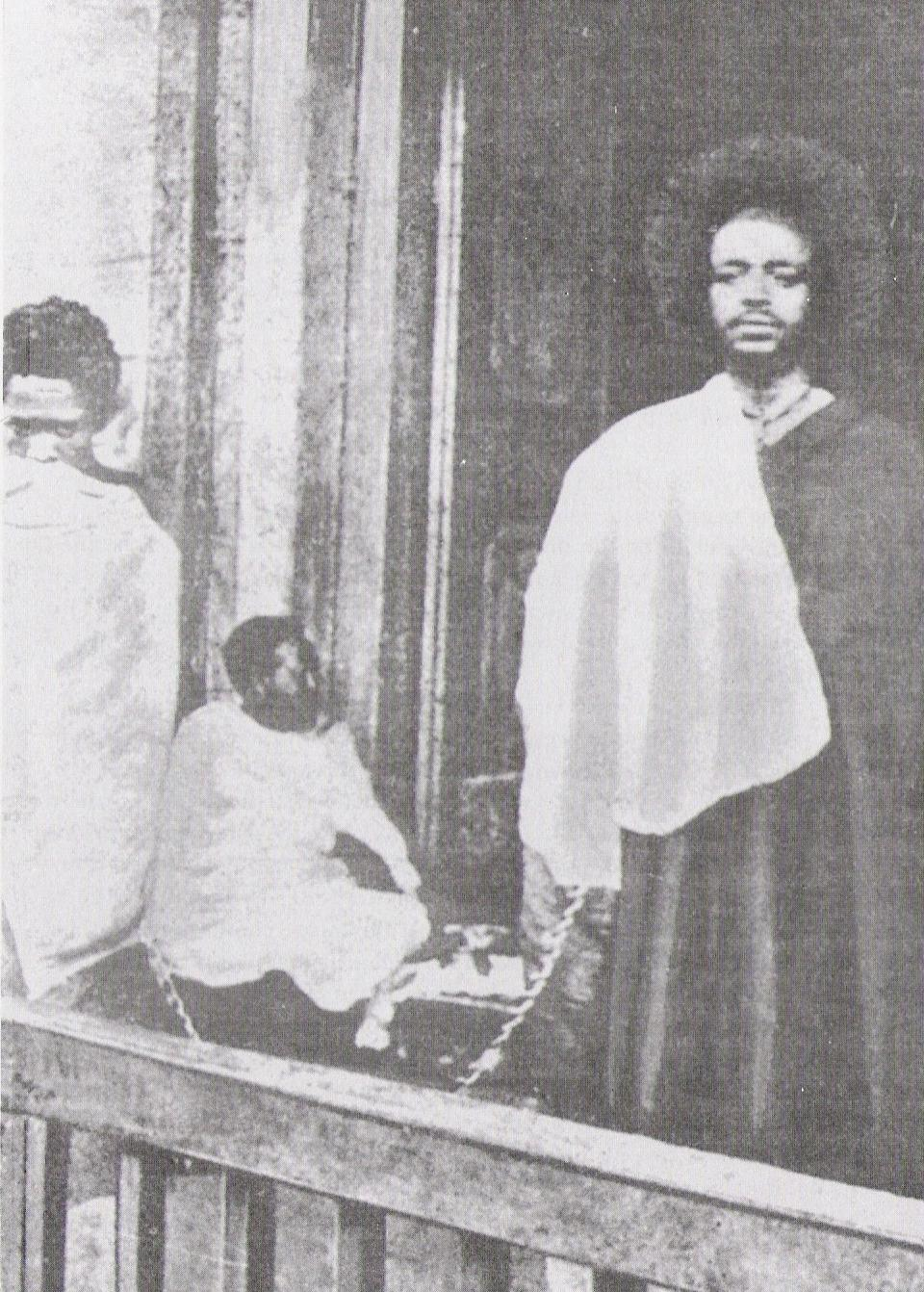
King Gaki Sherocho after his capture in 1897

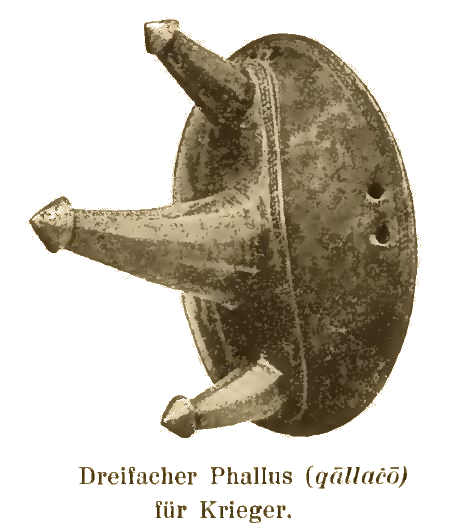
Phallic warrior headgear (17th century)

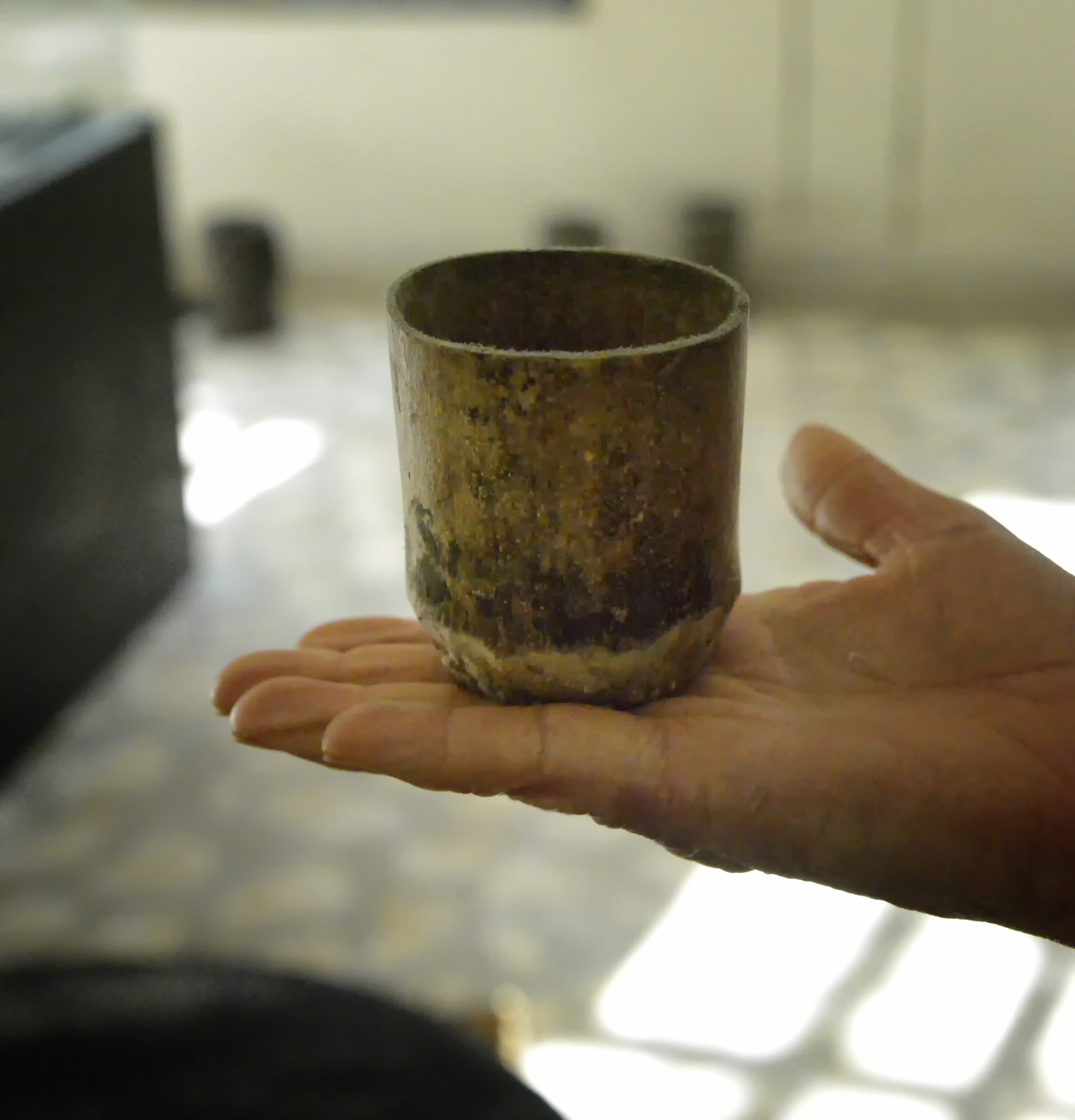
A coffee cup from the era of the Kaffa Kingdom

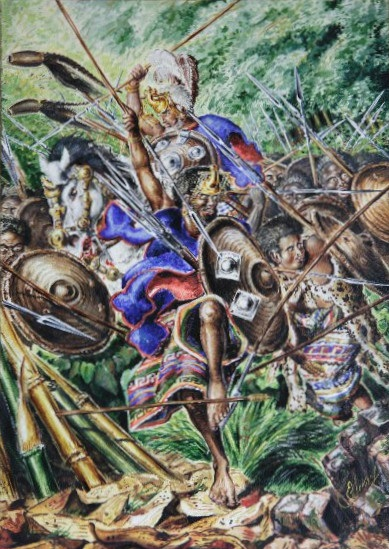
Painting of Kafficho warriors in battle (c. 1900)

== See also ==
- Monarchies of Ethiopia (king list)
- Getachew Abate

== Bibliography ==
- Huntingford, G.W.B. (1955). The Galla of Ethiopia; the Kingdoms of Kafa and Janjero. London: International African Institute.
- Orent, Amnon (1970). "Refocusing on the History of Kafa prior to 1897: A Discussion of Political Processes". African Historical Studies. 3 (2). Boston University African Studies Center: 263–293. doi:10.2307/216217. ISSN 0001-9992.
