= Lechemti massacre =

- Part of the Second Italo-Ethiopian War
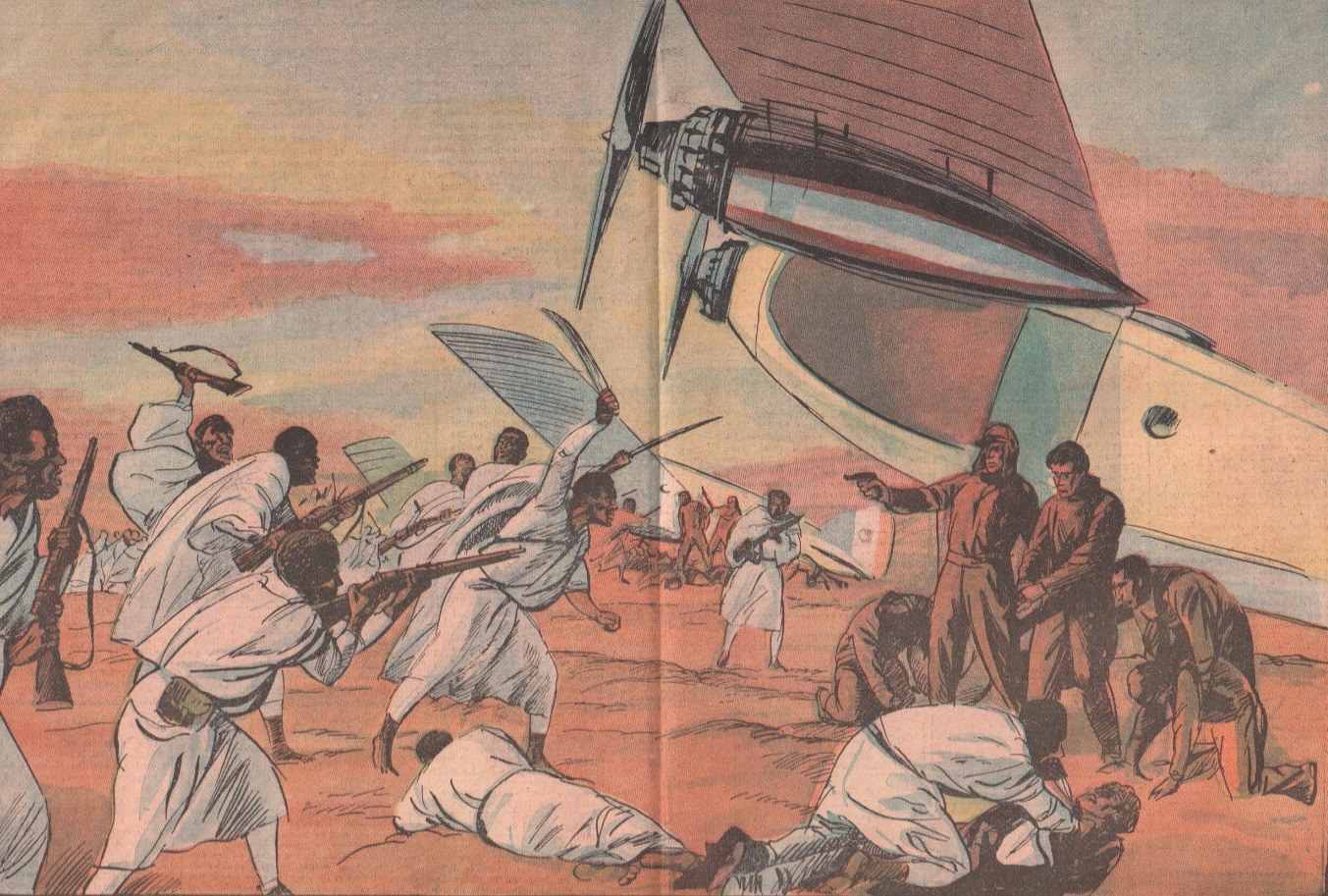
- Illustration of the attack from Le Pèlerin, 26 July 1936
| Date | 26 June 1936; 90 years ago |
| Location | Nekemte, Ethiopia |
| Result | Ethiopian victory |

Belligerents
| (Ethiopian Empire) Black Lions | Italy |

Commanders and leaders
| (Ethiopian Empire) Keflè Nesibù (Ethiopian Empire) Belay Haileab | (Kingdom of Italy) Vincenzo Magliocco † (Kingdom of Italy) Antonio Locatelli † |

Strength
| 150 guerrillas | 13 men |

Casualties and losses
| 2 wounded | 12 killed |

The Lechemti massacre or massacre of Bonàia was an attack carried out during the night between 26 and 27 June 1936 by a group of Ethiopian guerrillas against an Italian military air expedition, led by General Vincenzo Magliocco, camped on the Bonàia airfield, near Nekemte (known in Italian sources as Lechemti), in the western region of Ethiopia.

The objective of the military mission was to convince an Oromo leader, Dejazmatch Hapte Mariam, stationed in Lechemti, to submit to Italian forces in order to establish an Italian garrison in the western region, which would facilitate the Italian conquest of western Ethiopia. All the Italian members of the mission (including the flying ace Antonio Locatelli) were killed during a night attack carried out by young students from the Holeta military school, who were previously undergoing training by five Swedish officers led by Viking Tamm. The Italian soldiers were later awarded the Gold Medal of Military Valor. Only Father Mario Borello survived the massacre. He had previously contacted Hapte Mariam himself and convinced Viceroy Rodolfo Graziani to undertake the expedition.

== Background ==
Shortly after the occupation of Addis Ababa on 5 May 1936, the Fascist government found itself faced with the difficult situation of having to conquer the vast territories to the west, in particular the centres of Lechemti, Jimma, Gambela and Gore, the latter being the seat of a provisional government presided over by Imru Haile Selassie who received instructions directly from Haile Selassie. With Addis Ababa surrounded by Ethiopian forces, and with the Italian army making slow and laborious advances into Harar and Borana, Viceroy Rodolfo Graziani also had to register the complaints of Mussolini, who was pressing for the army to advance as soon as possible towards Gore to demonstrate to Great Britain and the rest of the world that the region to the west and the city were in the hands of the Kingdom of Italy. Mussolini was also concerned about the presence in Gore of the English consul Esme Nourse Erskine, who was posing as the protector of western Ethiopia, encouraging the population to obey the Ethiopian authorities and not submit to Italy, and who, according to the Duce, was preparing the ground for an English penetration into the territories bordering Sudan.

Mussolini was unaware that Minister Anthony Eden had given Erskine clear instructions to avoid assisting resistance efforts against the Italians, but only to ensure the safety of British citizens in Ethiopia. In reality, Erskine, while pretending to collaborate with Gore's government, was also negotiating with the Oromo leaders, who wanted to rid themselves of Amhara rule in the southwestern region, so that they would accept a British mandate. On June 10, Erskine met with the head of the Oromo delegation, the young Dejazmatch Hapte Mariam Gabre Egziahaber, who in Lechemti created the embryo of the new government, the "Western Galla Confederation," and who, along with sixty other notables, signed a petition requesting a British mandate over western Ethiopia.

Erskine telegraphed London the same day, communicating the fait accompli, but Eden realized that any decision would embarrass London: on the one hand, accepting the mandate would provoke Haile Selassie's resentment, on the other, reinstalling the emperor in Gore would arouse the indignation of the Oromo, who had so vigorously urged British intervention. In either case, Mussolini could have triggered a war that London was trying hard to avert, and consequently, on July 3, London communicated to Erskine that the government would not accept the Oromo's appeal.

Concerned by the events that were shaking Gore and Lechemti, Graziani and Mussolini decided to organize an expedition towards Lechemti, from where the Consolata missionary Father Mario Borello kept Addis Ababa constantly informed of events. Borello, who resided in the capital of the Leqa for over twenty years, managed to reconnect with his old student Hapte Mariam and his uncle, the Fitawrari Mossa Ghigio, and from their letters he communicated to Graziani his belief that the Oromo leaders were more inclined to accept Italian rather than English rule, provided they were freed from the Amhara presence as soon as possible. And based on these conjectures, preparations began for an airborne expedition to Lechemti.

Since heavy rains had made the roads impassable, the viceroy decided to send an air expedition to meet with Dejazmatch Hapte Mariam, who it was hoped could be easily bribed and subdued. For the occasion, three planes were equipped to use the Bonàia airport, twenty kilometers from the city. The mission's purpose was to make contact with the Oromo leaders, accept their submission, and commit them to guaranteeing the region's security while waiting for other planes to bring more men to establish an Italian garrison in Lechemti. Father Borello, however, failed to consider that Hapte Mariam was under severe pressure from Gore's government, and he was unaware that presumably as early as June 11, at least 150 students from the Holeta military school and Eritrean deserters had arrived in Lechemti, sent by Gore to monitor Hapte Mariam's movements.

== The Massacre ==
=== Arrival of the aerial mission ===
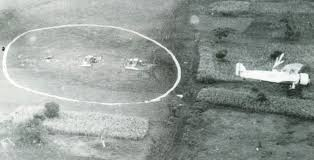
The Bonaia airfield

On June 26, 1936, the expedition led by General Vincenzo Magliocco took off from the Addis Ababa airfield aboard two Caproni Ca.133 bombers and an IMAM Ro.37 reconnaissance aircraft, heading west towards Lechemti (about 230 km) with the task of contacting some local leaders and ensuring their loyalty to Italy. They carried with them 3,000 silver Maria Theresa thalers, with which they would hire an army to occupy the area. The first aircraft was piloted personally by Magliocco, while the second was commanded by aviator Antonio Locatelli, already well-known at the time, having previously been awarded a gold medal for military valor for his famous flight over Vienna in 1918.

Starting at 11:00 and every hour, General Magliocco radioed the flight status. The air formation was spotted in the skies of Lechemti by Swedish nurse Karin Söderström, and leaflets were dropped from the planes with a request for a meeting with Hapte Mariam, who invited the Swedish missionaries (Erik and Gusti Söderström with their daughter, Karin Söderström, the Kågebo couple and Stina Sköld) to flee immediately: already on Saturday morning they were evacuated to Gimbi, to then continue further west towards Gambela.

After landing in Bonaia at 13:00 on a meadow about 500 meters long, at 2.45 pm General Magliocco telegraphed to Addis Ababa the good continuation of the expedition and in the late afternoon twelve Oromo soldiers arrived at the Bonàia camp on the orders of Hapte Mariam to protect the expedition, together with the Fitawrari Mossa Ghigio, the Fitawrari Wolde Bajeena and the ato Mekonnen Jambare as his delegates. The two delegates were then hosted for the night by the Fitawrari Muleta, while the two Ethiopian interpreters of the Italian expedition spent the night at the home of the telephone operator Mogossie. Feeling reasonably safe, General Magliocco therefore had a makeshift camp set up around the three aircraft, awaiting the meeting with Hapte Mariam the next day. He also positioned two machine guns, just in case.

=== The Ethiopian attack ===
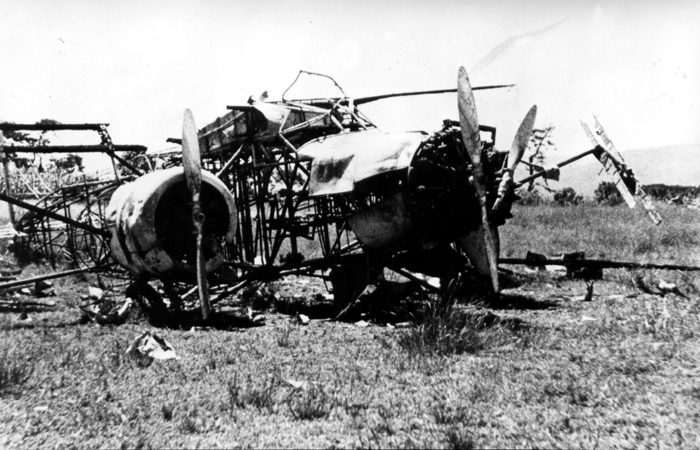
Remains of one of the planes that landed at Bonaia

Eager to fight against the Italian occupiers, the students of Holeta escaped Hapte Mariam's control and, on the night between June 26th and 27th, attacked the Italian camp, protected by the vast cornfield surrounding the planes. The only testimony to the events comes from the sole survivor of the massacre, Father Borello, who was able to witness the scene thanks to the seclusion in a grove a few dozen meters away. The prelate reported that "[...] there was almost no resistance. Some [Italians] were trapped in the burning aircraft. Others attempted to defend themselves, but were immediately shot down. As for the Galla guards who were supposed to protect us, they fled at the first shots."

Borello later reported that he had taken refuge with his friend, Mossa Ghigio, until the Italians arrived in October. This version is partially contradicted by journalist Ciro Poggiali, who writes in his diary that Borello had headed that afternoon toward the Consolata building from which he had fled at the outbreak of war. Therefore, Angelo Del Boca expresses doubt about Borello's testimony, while noting that the Ethiopians have also left very few traces of their attack. Only that the operation was led by Keflè Nasibù, Belai Haileab, and the son of Dejazmatch Habtemikael Yenadu, both of whom returned to Gore in July.

According to the Air Force Historical Office, during the assault, the Italians began to fire with machine guns and defend themselves in hand-to-hand combat, but in the end 11 Italians were killed on the spot, while only two were wounded among the attackers, who set fire to the three planes of the expedition. Confirming the difficulty in reconstructing the facts, there is the story of 1st Airman Alberto Agostino, who according to the Historical Archive of the Ministry of Italian Africa was not wounded during the attack, but was killed a few days later during a firefight between the students of Holeta and the armed men of the Fitawrari Mossa, while according to Borello's testimony, Agostino died a few days later due to a wound to the lung suffered during the clashes on the night of the attack.

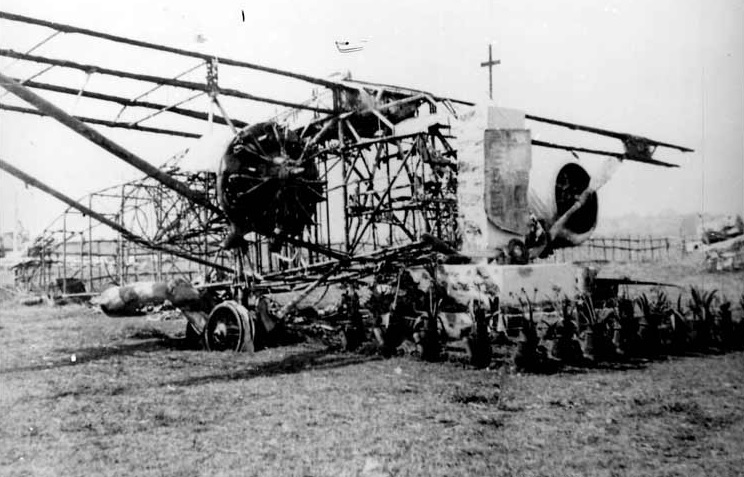
The monument to Bonaia

=== The members of the expedition ===
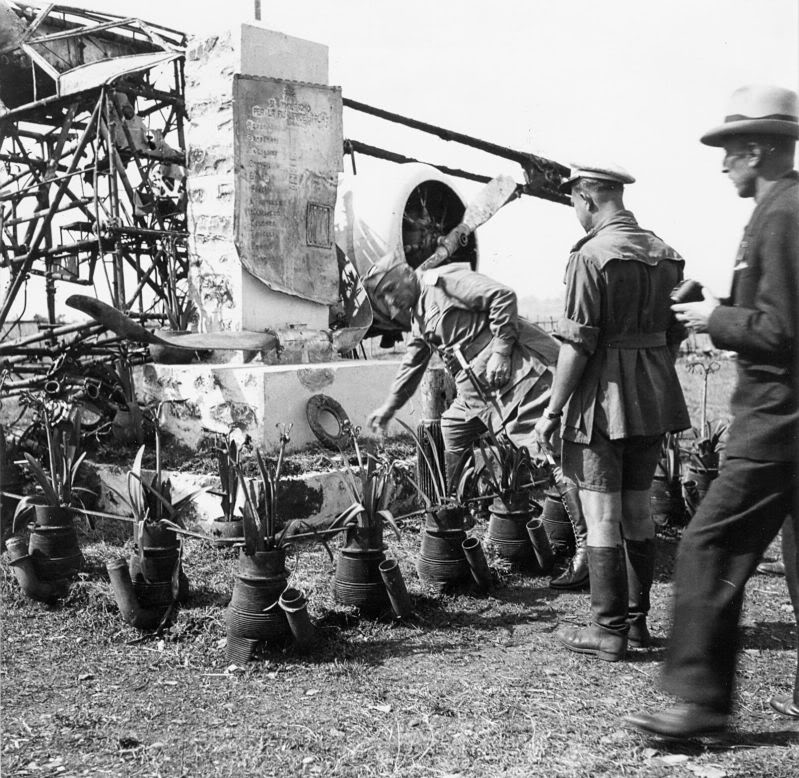
The memorial to the fallen in Bonaia

The dead

1. Vincenzo Magliocco, brigadier general
2. Antonio Locatelli, major pilot
3. Mario Calderini, colonel
4. Mario Galli, pilot captain
5. Antonio Drammis dei Drammis, captain observer
6. Luigi Gabelli, lieutenant pilot
7. Giorgio Bombonati, pilot marshal
8. Renato Ciprari, radio operator sergeant
9. William D'Altri, 1st airman motorist
10. Alberto Agostini, 1st airman engineer
11. Giulio Malenza, airman and radio operator
12. Adolfo Prasso, engineer soldier

Survivors

1. Father Mario Borello, lieutenant chaplain

== Aftermath ==
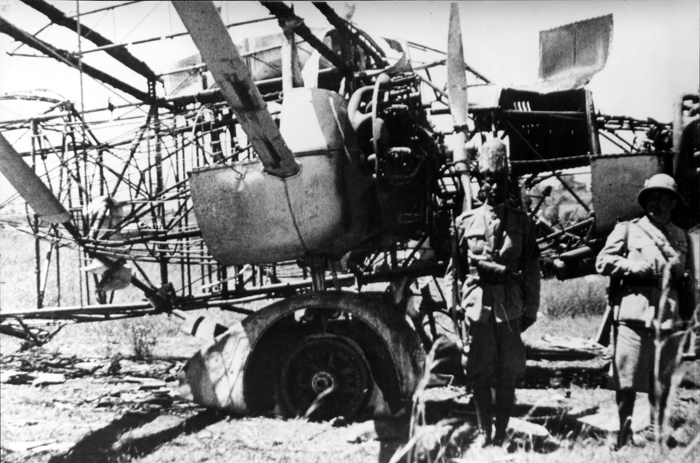
Remains of an airplane

According to an article in La Stampa dated 11 July 1936, the wreckage of the three planes was spotted the day after the attack by an Italian aircraft, with the photographer Baccari on board, piloted by Captain Mario Bonzano, he saw the three burned planes, the scattered sacks of food, and the bodies around them. Newspapers at the time reported them to be Abyssinians, but they were presumably members of the expedition. Other planes were sent in the following days, confirming what he observed. Only on July 5th did a message from Father Borello arrive in Addis Ababa, thanks to a courier of eight natives, with the first brief information, in which he stated that he had taken refuge in the home of his friend, Mossa Ghigio.

The news of the massacre created widespread mourning in Italy, similar to that which followed the news of the massacre at the Gondrand shipyard in Mai Lahlà. Gabriele D'Annunzio, a good friend of Antonio Locatelli, dedicated a long epitaph to him where he promised to welcome his remains at the Vittoriale. On the morning of July 10, Mussolini sent the following telegram to the Locatelli family: "For me, Antonio Locatelli was one of the purest and most intrepid souls of Fascism, a soldier, a hero in the most classic and our sense of the word. You can imagine how saddened I was by his glorious death in the service of the Fatherland. He will be honored and avenged."

Foreign Minister Galeazzo Ciano immediately expressed his support for an aerial retaliation against the capital Lechemti, but the retaliation did not take place because on July 4th the League of Nations revoked the sanctions and rejected Haile Selassie's request for help, effectively recognizing Italian possession of Ethiopia, which reassured Mussolini, who on July 6th reported to Graziani that the conquest of the West was no longer an emergency, postponing the total occupation of those territories after having pacified the situation in Addis Ababa and Shoa, limiting himself for the moment to aerial bombing operations of the most important centers. Other sources report that on 5 July 1936 the Italian air force heavily hit the school complex recently inaugurated by the Swedish missionaries with 19 bombs and machine guns. The news of the retaliation is confirmed by Vittorio Dan Segre, who reports that "the retaliation was so bloody that it triggered Ethiopian resistance activity". The news of "mass reprisal actions against the raiders and the villages where they had taken refuge" appeared in the newspaper La Stampa on 9 July.

Meanwhile, in Lechemti, after the departure of Holeta's cadets, Father Borello resumed his efforts to persuade the Oromo leaders, threatening terrible reprisals if they did not submit to Italian forces. On July 21, he persuaded Hapte Mariam to return to Lechemti, after he had prudently abandoned it following the attack, and to renounce his plans for a "Galla Confederation" and accept Italian rule. On October 2nd, with the situation in the region completely calm, a patrol of IMAM Ro.37s led by Colonel Umberto Baistrocch managed to land at Bonàia. On October 8, in the presence of Baistrocchi and Borello, Dejazmatch Hapte Mariam swore allegiance to Italy, raising the Italian flag over his palace in Lechemti. In the following days, men and materials began arriving in Bonàia via an airlift organized by Air Squadron General Pinna. A bridgehead was then established at Lechemti, which would allow for penetration to the west, and a garrison was established under the command of Lieutenant Colonel Marone.

On October 11, two planes carrying radio equipment landed: Lieutenant-pilot Mario Faccioli and two radio operators, Bruno Spadaro (a select airman from the 103rd Squadron) and Elpidio Benetti (110th Squadron), remained behind to set up a radio station and build an airstrip that would allow for the landing of multiple aircraft. In just three days, using local labor, Faccioli managed to prepare the landing field, and upon his return to Italy, he brought Locatelli's mother the propeller from his son's plane and a handful of Bonaia's soil.

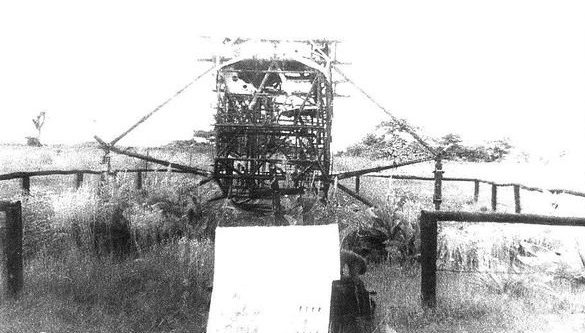
Wreckage of an airplane at the beginning of the 1940s

In memory of the massacre in February 1939 the Viceroy of Italian East Africa, Amedeo d'Aosta and the Colonial Minister Attilio Teruzzi they inaugurated in Lechemti a monument to the fallen of the massacre, already commissioned by Rodolfo Graziani and carried out by the governor Pietro Gazzera. A memorial stone was erected on the same site with the names of the victims engraved on a sheet of metal near the carcass of one of the burnt planes.

The few remains of the fallen, recovered in December 1936 by Father Borello and initially taken to Addis Ababa, were brought back to the Bonaia airfield and walled up in the memorial pillar. Shortly after the massacre, the Alpine soldier Federico Bruseghini managed to recover four fragments of Antonio Locatelli's plane: the relics are now preserved and displayed at the Italian War History Museum in Rovereto, in the province of Trento. All the members of the mission were awarded the gold medal of military valor, and among them Adolfo Prasso who is the only known example of a mixed-race civilian to have received this very high honor during the Ethiopian campaign.

With the defeat of Italian forces during the East African campaign against British forces and the subsequent restitution of the emperor's throne to Haile Selassie, the wreckage of the aircraft and the memorial were destroyed.

== Bibliography ==
- Da Addis Abeba a Lechemti e Gambela (PDF). Milano: Consociazione Italiana Turistica. 1938. pp. 502–503.
- Del Boca, Angelo (2014). Gli italiani in Africa Orientale - 3. La caduta dell'Impero. Milano: Mondadori. ISBN 978-88-520-5496-9.
- Fraschetti, Alessandro (1986). La prima organizzazione dell'Aeronautica Militare in Italia 1884-1925. Roma: Ufficio Storico dell'Aeronautica Militare.
- Allan Hofgren (1957). Jag minns den gången (in Swedish). Stoccolma: Fosterlands-Stiftelsens. p. 66. OCLC 31338424.
- Lioy, Vincenzo (1965). L'Italia in Africa. L'opera dell'Aeronautica (1919-1937), Vol. 2. Roma: Istituto Poligrafico dello Stato.
- Molfese, Manlio (1925). L'aviazione da ricognizione italiana durante la grande guerra europea (maggio 1915-novembre-1918). Roma: Provveditorato generale dello Stato.
- Ordine Militare d'Italia 1911-1964. Roma: Ufficio Storico dell'Aeronautica Militare. 1925.
- Ufficio Storico dell'Aeronautica Militare (1969). Testi delle motivazioni di concessione delle Medaglie d'Oro al Valor Militare. Roma: Stato Maggiore dell'Aeronautica Militare.

== Related entries ==
- Lechemti
- Black Lions
- Arbegnoch
