= Dejazmach Jote Tulu =

Ruler of Leqa Qellam, Ethiopia (died 1918)

Jote Tulu Gootee Tulluu
- Dejazmach
- A portrait of Dejazmach Jote displayed in Adwa Museum

Moti ('King' in Oromo)
- Reign: 1868–1918
- Predecessor: Moti Tulu
- Successor: Fitawrari Merdasa Jote
- Born: 1855
- Died: 1918 (aged 62–63); Debre Birhan
- Oromo: Mooti Gootee Tulluu
- Amharic: ደጃዝማች ጆቴ ቱሉ
- Religion: Waaqeffanna, then converted to Ethiopian Orthodox Tewahedo Church in 1886.

Dejazmach Jote Tullu (Amharic:ደጃዝማች ጆቴ ቱሉ) (Oromo: Mooti Gootee Tulluu) was the Oromo ruler of Leqa Qellam of Ethiopia between 1868 and 1918. According to Bahru Zewde, his life is commonly dated as 1855–1918. He inherited the Gaada community of his father Moti Tulu, and expanded it to form a hereditary monarchy called the Leqa kingdom of Qellam, which was centred on Gidami (Oromo: Gidaamii).

== Early life and ancestry ==
He was born in approximately 1868, although sources provide no exact birth date or village, but they preserve two accounts of his ancestry:

=== Assimilation with lineage from Gojjam ===
Based on oral testimony, Bahru Zewde gives the genealogy: Jote - Tulu - Guda - Sefi - Boye - Nedi - Dicho - Wanaga. Wanaga is said to have come from Gojjam, with the later names Oromized (for example Sefi from Sayfu, Boye from Abboye, Wanaga from Wanag Seged). Wanaga settled near Naqamptee, and his grandson Boye moved to the Gidami region and defeated Abba Bisqana, a Ganqa ruler who governed the local Oromo. The family then merged into the local Oromo community as the Wanaga clan, which rose to prominence under its first mooti, Tullu.

=== Adoptive father ===
Lambert Bartels records a different story: Jote's father was an Amhara from Gojjam, who divorced Jote's mother. She then married Tullu, a local lord, who adopted the boy as his son, hence "Jote Tullu". Local tradition describes Jote as Tullu's step-son who inherited and enlarged the kingdom. Whether the story is literally true or a later construction, it describes gradual rise of an Abyssinian-origin man integrated into local Oromo society.

The Dutch traveller Schuver, who visited the court in the 1880s, called him "Bula", which may have been his youthful name.

== Ruler of Leqa Qellam ==
=== Northwestern conquests and expansion of Leqa Qellam ===
Early in his reign, Jote's kingdom grew at the expense of neighbouring peoples. He raided and subjected the Busasi kingdom of Anfillo, which had its own dynasty and links to the Sidama , as well as the Galaan and Begi peoples. Additionally, he continued ruling the six Sayyoo Oromo subgroups who were united by his father Mooti Tulu. In Begi he gained control of the trade routes to Sudan.

A distinguishing remark by Schuver captures this period of Jote's conquests:

If I call Bula a 'King' it is because a man, who can easily raise 20,000 spearmen, without counting his slave-troops and negro-vassals and who enjoys power and authority comparatively greater than any constitutional monarch, cannot be well called by the same name as the first small village 'chief'."

— Juan Maria Schuver, Jote Tulu, Book I: Between Two Niles of Juan Maria Schuver's Travels in North East Africa 1880-1883

Northwest of Leqa Qellam, Jote proceeded through the Komo and Mao people who acted partly as his vassals and suffered his slave raids as he pursued routes to Sudan. According to Yasin Mohammed, the social structures of the Komo were dismantled and put under local representatives and Oromo loyalists who were called warra gofta. These representatives were at times placed over them to extract honey, ivory and grain. Although not all the peoples were invaded. Some Mao traded peacefully at Gidami, some paid tribute, some ambushed caravans, and others were absorbed into the Oromo peasantry or became gäbaro.

== Trade routes and wealth in Sudan ==
As his slave-troops and vassals grew enormously, he began attempting to capture the trade routes toward Asosa and Sudan. He exploited them intensely, including through transit trade and slave trading, especially those toward Asosa and Sudan, and exploited them intensely, including through transit trade and slave trading. His primary rival was the northern Sheik Khojale of Asosa, a regional ruler near the Sudanese border, who raided Begi for slaves, although remained an essential partner for Jote's trade with Sudan.

== Mahdist invasions and alliance with Ethiopian Shewa ==
=== Mahdist jihad against Leqa Qellam ===
Over time, Jote continued to build considerable wealth and influence through his control of trade routes connecting his kingdom Leqa Qellam with Sudan, as well as through persistent slave-raiding activities among the groups west of his kingdom.

In 1886, Sudanese Mahdist forces launched an intensive jihad against Jote Tulu, invading the kingdom of Leqa Qellam. At the same time, he faced attacks from neighbouring Anfillo forces, leaving his kingdom threatened from two directions. Jote temporarily accepted Mahdist supremacy to protect his territory from further destruction. According to oral traditions, he even nominally converted to Islam for a brief period.

The oppression under Mahdist rule and its demands for tribute caused alienation among the Oromo leadership. Jote abandoned his allegiance to the Mahdists and sought refuge with his father-in-law, Moti Moroda Bekere, who was ruler of the Leqa Nekemte kingdom. Recognising the shared threat posed by Mahdist expansion, Jote and Moroda sought assistance from the expanding Kingdom of Shewa.

=== Battle of Guté Dili ===
In 1888, Moti Jote Tulu and Moti Moroda, formed a military coalition that was supported by the Shewan army under Ras Gobana Dacche, who was known to be one of the leading generals in Shewa. At the Battle of Guté Dili, the combined forces defeated the Mahdist army, breaking its influence in the region of the Leqa kingdoms and pushing its forces back across the Birbir River. The campaign also resulted in the re-subjugation of Anfillo and secured Jote's authority over the area. This successful military cooperation with Moroda and the imperial forces strengthened their political ties and brought the Leqa kingdoms closer to Emperor Menelik II.

== Shewan incorporation and military expeditions ==
=== Incorporation into the Ethiopian Empire ===
Following the military cooperation at Guté Dili, Moti Jote Tulu peacefully submitted to Menelik II of Shewa and received the military title of Dejazmach (Amharic: ደጃዝማች). He was given partial independence over his kingdom within the expanding Ethiopian Empire, which allowed him to retain his title as Moti (King), and gain considerable regional influence around his kingdom. This alliance reflected the growing incorporation of Western Oromia into the Ethiopian imperial political and military structure.

As part of his alliance with Menelik II, Jote promoted the Ethiopian Orthodox Church in Leqa Qellam. He and his family converted from Waaqeffanna, and were the first baptised in the kingdom, with some kinsmen and subjects following. Around twelve churches were built during his reign. The same occurred with Dejazmach Kumsa Moroda's (son and successor to Moti Moroda Bekere) kingdom in Nekemte.

==== The Bela-Shangul Expedition ====
Jote Tulu participated in a further imperial military expedition into Bela-Shangul. This campaign pursued by the Ethiopian Empire, was by Kumsa Moroda, Jote Tulu and Ras Makonnen of Harar. The prolonged military campaign resulted in Sheik Khojele to submit to Ethiopian authority. The expedition allowed imperial influence to progress further in the western frontier and demonstrated Jote Tulu's continued importance as a regional military leader in Ethiopia's external affairs.

Battle of Adwa

The Battle of Adwa was the definitive battle of the First Italo-Ethiopian War, fought on March 1–2, 1896, in northern Ethiopia. The Ethiopian army led by Emperor Menelik II and Empress Taytu Betul decisively defeated the invading Italian forces into Ethiopia.

While prominent generals like Ras Makonnen of Harar and Ras Mikael of Wollo led the army directly onto the Adwa battlefield, Emperor Menelik II issued an Imperial Decree of Mobilization on September 17, 1895. This included forces held by Dejazmach Jote Tulu of Leqa Qellam, Dejazmach Gebre-Egzabiher (Kumsa Moroda) of Leqa Nekemte, and Sultan Abba Jifar of the Kingdom of Jimma. Their combined forces were responsible for providing critical financial backing, large mobilizations of regional troops, and logistical support. Abba Jifar in particular dispatched 60,000 Maria Theresa thalers to fund the imperial war effort, While Dejazmach Gebre-Egzabiher and Dejazmach Jote Tulu oversaw a joint southwestern army of frontline troops mobilizing thousands of regional fighters from their territories to aid the central imperial army. This strategic defensive and logistical support was crucial to enabling the historic Adwa Victory in 1896.

== Harshening of Rule and Eventual Annexation into Ethiopian Empire ==
Over time, it is said the rule of Jote become increasingly harsh, particular in treatment of his own subjects and persistent oppression of the Busasi clan of Anfillo. Oral gabbar songs, analysed by Alessandro Triulzi remember him as part of a predatory landlord order that took tribute, labour and arbitrary levies from peasants.

Loss of Autonomy and Imprisonment

In the early 20th century the Menelik II gradually stripped him of autonomy over economic and political factors pertaining to his imperial ambitions. Particularly noted, was Menelik's ambition over the trade routes Jote held control of. Following this, in 1909, Jote was arrested and held in Addis Ababa. The official ruling was "secret dealings with the British administration in Sudan" and misgovernment, though historians debate whether these were real causes or a pretext. His son Merdasa Jote (Oromo: Mardassa Gootee) succeeded him, and began his rule over Leqa Qellam.

Shewan Intervention and Rebellion under Merdasa Jote

In 1908, Shewan intervention in Qellem grew and Merdasa was forcibly replaced with direct Amhara rule under the Neftengya system. In November 1908, Qellem was placed directly under Fitawrari Sahle Giorgis who was the brother of Ras Tesemma Nadew. This represented the first loss of autonomy for the kingdom of Leqa Qellam.

Eventually, a revolt led by Merdasa broke out against the new Shewan governor. During Jote's imprisonment, Fitawrari Amaya Tullu, governor of the Sayyoo district (capital Dambi Dollo), went with Merdasa to Sudan seeking British help for his father. It is said that Merdasa travelled to London after three years and returned with a letter from King George, and that he was briefly jailed for refusing to hand it to Ras Tesemma Nadew instead of directly to Menelik. Order was restored only when Dejazmach Jote was released and reinstated as ruler of Qellam in 1912.

==== Imprisonment in Debre Birhan and Death ====
Following his reinstatement, Emperor Menelik II died in 1913. Lij Iyasu was his next successor to the Ethiopian throne. He married Jote's daughter Askale Jote. This was a strategic move, allowing Iyasu to build a political coalition inclusive of non-Shewan allies. Iyasu's political affinities were unusual amongst the Shewan elites, and he was overthrown in 1916. This led to the political exposure of Dejazmach Jote, who then again was deposed in 1917 and sent to imprisonment in Debre Birhan. In March 1918, Dejazmach Berru established direct Amhara rule in Qellem through a heavy punitive campaign, with many families of Leqa Qellam fleeing to Begi.

Ultimately, Jote's imprisonment at Debre Birhan led to his death. Some sources say it was after about six years, which would put his death in the mid-1920s, however this remains an unresolved point in the scholarship, and 1918 is the conventional date.
