= List of kings of Leqa Naqamte =

Leqa Naqamte, also known as Leqa Neqemte, was a polity from 1841 to 1897 in what later became the Welega Province of Ethiopia. It was formed as an outgrowth of the power of the city of Nekemte which remained its capital. Its growth came as a result of the power-extending policies of Bekere Godana. In 1897 it was incorporated into Ethiopia by the expansionist policies of Menelik.

Moti = Rulers

| Tenure | Incumbent | Notes |
|---|---|---|
| before 1871 | Foundation of Leqa Naqamte state | |
| 1841 to 1868 | Bekere Godana, Moti | |
| 1871 to 1888 | Mereda Bekere, Moti | |
| 1888 to 1923 | Kumsa Mereda, Moti | Son of Kumsa Moroda also called Gebre Igziabiher is Dejazmach Habte Mariam Gebre-Igziabiher, appointed governor of Welega |
| 1882 | Leqa Naqamte incorporated into Ethiopia | |
| ? to ? | Dejazmach Fikre Selassie Hapte Mariam, Moti||married Princess Ijigayehu of Ethiopia, appointed governor of Welega | |
| ? to ? | Lij Samson Fikre Selassie | |

== See also ==
- Monarchies of Ethiopia
- Rulers and heads of state of Ethiopia
