= Black Lions =

Ethiopian anti-fascist resistance movement

The Black Lions (Amharic: ጥቁር አንበሳ; Tikur Anbessa) were an anti-fascist movement formed to fight against Fascist Italy during the occupation of the Ethiopian Empire as part of the greater Arbegnoch resistance. The Black Lions dominated the early resistance movement in Ethiopia. Members of the Black Lions included students from the Holeta Military Academy and foreign-educated Ethiopians. They were most notably responsible for the Lechemti massacre of 26 June 1936, in which they ambushed an Italian-controlled airfield near present-day Nekemte.

Named after the genetically distinct long and dark maned lions of the Ethiopian Highlands commonly known as Ethiopian Lions, Black-Maned Lions, or simply Tikur Ambessa which had long served as a symbol of the empire, Bahru Zewde notes that in spite of its "marginal impact on the Resistance" the Black Lions made "eloquent attempts to give the struggle coherent ideological and political direction."

== History ==
The Black Lions movement was founded in western Ethiopia by cadets of the Holeta military school and young Ethiopian students who had attended universities abroad. The organization had given itself a decalogue, in which among other things the supremacy of the political sphere over the military was affirmed, it condemned the mistreatment of peasants and prisoners of war and urged people to prefer death rather than capture by the enemy. It included a number of intellectuals such as Heruy Wolde Selassie (the Foreign Minister of Ethiopia) and Yilma Deressa (a prominent member of the Welega Oromo aristocracy). Its chairman was Alemework Beyene, a veterinary surgeon educated in Britain. The organization had a constitution consisting of ten points, which included: asserting the supremacy of the political sphere over the military, injunctions against mistreating peasants and prisoners of war, forbidding its members from seeking exile and urging them to prefer death to capture by the enemy.

The Black Lions convinced Ras Imru Haile Selassie to join them in the armed struggle since he was part of the dynamics that created the movement. Ras Imru was appointed by Emperor Haile Selassie as prince regent in his absence. Ras Imru was to reorganize and continue to resist the Italians. To do this, he fell back to Gore in southern Ethiopia. On 19 December 1936, after the Italians pinned him down on the north bank of the Gojeb River, Ras Imru surrendered. The Black Lions organization then collapsed, and many of its members were executed.

The group was effectively disbanded following the surrender of the Ras Imru Haile Selassie 18 December 1936. The majority of its members were killed by the Italians following the unsuccessful attempt on Rodolfo Graziani's life on 19 February 1937. The few survivors included Alemework and Yilma.

Their influence lingers in the Ethiopian national psyche with them as a common topic of historical pride remembered in the Black Lion Hospital, Tikur Anbessa High School, and more.

== See also ==
- Italian East Africa
- Second Italo-Ethiopian War
