= Illubabor Province =

Former province in southwestern Ethiopia

Coordinates: 8°N 35°E

Location of Illubabor within the Ethiopian Empire

Illubabor (Amharic: ኢሉባቦር) was a province in the south-western part of Ethiopia, along the border with Sudan. The name Illubabor is said to come from two Oromo words, "Illu" and "Abba Bor(a)". "Illu" is a name of a clan, and "Abba Bor" was the horse name of Chali Shone, who founded the ruling family of the area when it was conquered by Shewa; hence IlluAbabor means the Illu belonging to Ababor(a).

Originally, its capital city was Gore, then around 1978 the capital was moved to Metu. With the adoption of a new constitution in 1995, the territory of Illubabor was divided among the Gambela, Oromia and the Southern Nations, Nationalities, and Peoples Regions of Ethiopia.

== History ==
Illubabor was, by the late 19th century, an Oromo state facing the prospect of forcibly being absorbed into the Ethiopian Empire, whose reconsolidation of authority over long-abandoned peripheral territories had been intensifying since the ascension of Menelik II, who had begun his southern campaigns while King of Shewa, to the imperial throne in 1889.

=== Invasion and reconquest ===
The last king of Illubabor was Fatansa Illu. When the imperial forces invaded Illubabor in 1889, the king sent messengers to Kumsa Mereda of Leqa Naqamte and Abba Jifar of Jimma to form an alliance to resist the imperial army. Although the messengers were warmly accepted by Kumsa Moroda, when they presented their message he declined the offer, saying that the provincial forces could not resist Imperial troops well armed with modern firearms. The messengers who went to Abba Jifar were unsuccessful. Both rulers had previously secured their autonomous status from Menilek.

Emperor Menelik II sent a message to Fatansa Illu where he was asked to submit to Menelik II's authority and that failure would lead to unnecessary deaths. Had Fatansa Illu peacefully submitted he would have been allowed autonomy under the condition that he pay the annual tax to pay for the defense of the empire. However, he refused and war was inevitable. Consequently, Ras Tessema Nadew led Emperor Menelek's force into Illubabor. When the lead elements of the Shewan forces reached the Gebba River, Fatansa's main forces began defensive attacks using spears and shields. However, when the major Shewan forces headed by Ras Tessema reached the Gaba river, the Illu defensive lines were broken and many villages were burnt down. After this incident the Shewan forces marched to the heart of Illubabor and camped at a place called Qarsa Gogila, near modern-day Metu.

After realizing the strength of the Shewans, Fatansa Illu made a show of accepting the Shewan victory. Fatansa even prepared a fabulous feast for the Shewan at their camp at midnight. However, Fatansa had his soldiers surround the camp to make a surprise attack on the invaders and a bloody battle took place; Fatansa's forces were overwhelmed by the firepower of Ras Tessema's men. Fatansa was captured and imprisoned at Barroi, about five kilometers from Metu.

=== Establishment of imperial administration ===
Ras Tessema made Gore the seat of his administration. It was at this time that the semi-feudal system of neftenya, balabats, and gebbars was introduced to Illubabor. The Shewan officials and soldiers who settled in Illubabor, known as neftenya or "Musketeers", were assigned to a number of peasant households, or gabbars depending on their rank and position. A Dejazmach was granted 1,000 peasant households, a Fitawrari 300, a Kenyazmach 100 to 150; a Shambal 70 to 90; a Mato Alaqa 40 to 60, Hamsalaqa 25 to 35 and an ordinary soldier 5 to 10. Each peasant household had to go to the land owned by the overland and contribute his labor as a form of tax. The overland provided food and drinks. At the end of the work, each peasant went back to their land or business. Taxes were collected from every married couple. In addition to the tax [gabbar] sometimes the local farmers built the fences and homes of the overlord. They had to supply honey, butter, chicken and fattened sheep or goat on holidays. Each household had to produce fifty kilos of grounded cearls to each nefteyaa every month. Furthermore, the peasants had to transport grain crops to the nearest government granaries. If a gabbar failed to fulfill his duties, he would be summoned to the court. As C.F. Rey had noticed ". . . The judges are the sub governor creatures of course take the side of the plaintiff in nine cases out of ten." The neftenyoch (plural of neftenya) could pass any judgment they wanted, short of capital punishment, which required Emperor Menelek's approval. But people were killed without even the consent of the governors especially in case of rebels or bandits.

The importance of Gore as a center for invaluable export trade items in Illubabor depended upon smaller markets such as Hurumu, Noppa, Metu and Bure. By 1930 each of these markets had a population of about 500 including resident foreign merchants. Import trade items to Illubabor were textiles, liquors, sacks, salt, soap, ironware, abujedid, machinery, glass bottles (birrile) and others. Exported trade items included ivory, rubber, coffee, and wax. Ras Tessema monopolized the ivory trade and controlled it for his own benefits. He deployed spies and prohibited any one from engaging in selling and buying of ivory. Rubber grew wild in Illubabor, and Gore was the center of the rubber trade. This was exported to Europe through the port at Gambela. Another important item exported through Gambela was coffee, which was brought there through Gore and Bure.

For the peasant society of Illubabor, the only means of earning money was to serve as porters of coffee, wax, hides, skins and salt bars between Gore and Gambela through Bure. The round trip journey took about eight to ten days. Porters were usually cheated of their earnings. A porter would carry a load with a certain weight and when he reached his destination, merchants would complain that it was some pounds lighter than what the porter had started with and thus deprived of most of his pay. The trade of the area was in the hands of foreigners and immigrants from the highlands and Shewa. Particularly, Ras Tessema and his officials benefited from the trade of the area. It is reported that he had frequently led punitive expeditions against the Gimira and captured thousands of slaves for himself and his soldiers.

After the fall of Haile Selassie, the first Chief-Administrator of the Illubabor Province was Ato Hussein Ismail, a statesman belonging to the Gadabursi clan residing in Ethiopia appointed by the DERG, Tafari Benti.

=== Reform and development ===
When Lij Iyasu was designated as a successor of Emperor Menelik II, Ras Tessema was summoned to Addis Ababa in 1908 to serve as Iyasu's regent. Ras Tessema was replaced as governor by his son Dejazmach Kebede Tessema (1908 - 1910); Dejazmach Kebede did not make any changes in the administrative system set up by his father. He was in turn succeeded by Dejazmach Ganame. The process of land measurement began under this governor, which was one of the most dramatic consequences of the consolidation of the new system in Illubabor. This process classified the land into various categories. The major ones were: Yemengist Meret (government land), Samon Meret (church land) and Siso (land to the balabats, or local supporters). Government land was registered exclusively as government property. It was from this category that land grants were made to the soldiers, or granted to government employees in lieu of salary. Samon Meret was Church land given to the church and was cultivated by the peasants for its benefit. Siso was a portion of land that was allocated to the local supporters. The balabats were allowed to retain one-third of the measured land, and the rest went to the government.

It was during the governorship of Dejazmach Ganame that the cultivation of coffee was further developed in Illubabor. Coffee became one of the most important trade items exported through Gambela to the Sudan. Traditionally, the Oromo cultivators were made to pay taxes on the amount of coffee they have actually picked from the trees and were permitted to retain those fallen coffee beans on the ground. In 1914 when Dejazmach Ganame started collecting taxes on the fallen coffee beans, the peasants protested against the new tax burdens. They sent a delegation to Addis Ababa to appeal the case to Ras Tafari (the future Emperor Haile Selassie.) Dejazmach Ganame was summoned to Addis Ababa and ordered to cease this tax on the fallen coffee beans.

=== Fascist occupation ===
The Fascist occupation in Illubabor led to the disintegration of the Neftenya-Gabbar system. The Italians proclaimed that all the land in the area belonged to the Italian government, but allowed gabbars to use the land under better terms. The Neftenya were deprived of their usufruct and their leading members were exiled from Illubabor, which led to some of the local Oromos accepting the Fascist occupation. Despite this, some of the local ballabats remained and collaborated with the Italians in administrating Illubabor. These included Eba Seko and Marga Karo: Marga Karo administered the people west of the Gebba river while Eba Seko was in charge of the people living east of the river

=== Post-war ===
This was however reversed after the liberation of Ethiopia.

== See also ==
- Illubabor Zone
- History of Ethiopia
