= Illubabor =

Illubabor can refer to:

- Illubabor Province, historic subdivision of Ethiopia
- Illubabor Zone, Ethiopia
