= Vincenzo Magliocco =

Italian aviator (1893–1936)

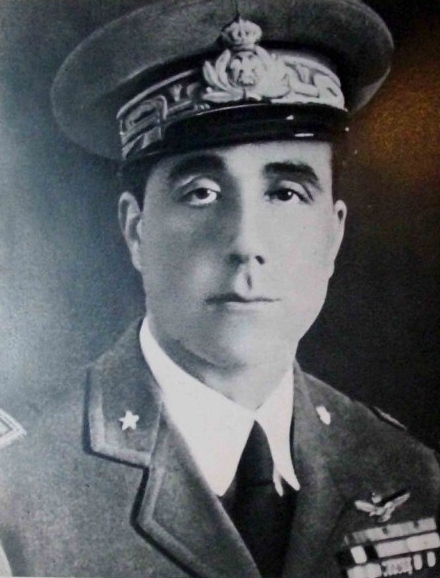
- Born: 1 January 1893; Palermo, Italy
- Died: 27 June 1936 (aged 43); Lechemti, Ethiopia
- Military career
- Allegiance: Kingdom of Italy
- Branch: Regia Aeronautica
- Rank: Brigadier general
- Conflicts: World War I Second Italo-Ethiopian War †
- Awards: Knight of Military Order of Savoy; Gold Medal of Military Valour; Silver Medal of Military Valour; Bronze Medal of Military Valour

Vincenzo Magliocco (1 January 1893 – 27 June 1936) was a Sicilian general and aviator of the Italian Royal Air Force and former soldier of the Royal Italian Army who served in the First World War and the Second Italo-Ethiopian War. During the latter conflict, he played a significant role in aerial operations, including the use of mustard gas.

He was killed on 27 June 1936 during the Lechemti massacre, when Ethiopian guerrillas killed him along with the other members of an aerial reconnaissance mission in western Ethiopia.

== Biography ==
Magliocco was born on 1 January 1893 in Palermo, Italy. He would study in his home town and achieve a degree in legal theory.

In 1915 Magliocco enlisted in the Royal Italian Army as an artillery officer, joining the 29th Field Artillery Regiment. Later that year he was promoted to sub-lieutenant, and would join a mountain artillery unit stationed on the Col di Lana, with whom he would fight during the outbreak of World War I.

Due to his merits in the war, Magliocco was promoted to Lieutenant in 1917, and, upon his request, was sent to Rome where he studied aviation in Centocelle for three months. He would return to combat in May as an "Airplane Observer," and earn one Bronze and two Silver Medals of Military Valor.

In June 1923, Magliocco was promoted to captain and assigned to a Reconnaissance Aviation Center stationed in Parma. In November of that year, he would join the Regia Aeronautica, the newly established Italian Royal Air Force. He would later be promoted to lieutenant colonel in 1929, and later, in 1932, he became a colonel.

=== Ethiopia ===
In 1934 Magliocco, a fascist supporter, was sent by the Italian government to Italian Eritrea to manage air bases in the colony due to worsening relations with the Ethiopian Empire. He then took command of the 14th Wing of the Regia Aeronautica in preparation of the upcoming war in Ethiopia.

During the Second Italo-Ethiopian War, would become infamous for his use of mustard gas. He participated in the battles of Enderta, Tembien, Shire and Maychew, but his most notable action was the massacre of Ethiopian troops on the banks of Lake Ashenge. On the 2nd of April Pietro Badoglio ordered General Magliocco to throw the entire air force of the Eritrean colony or the Air Bombardment Brigade in pursuit of the Ethiopian troops, expressly asking that "All aviators take to the skies and give no respite to the enemy. Tell them on my behalf that they will eat in forty-eight hours." On April 4th 1936, Magliocco led several squadrons of 150 Italian aircraft against the retreating columns of Ethiopians, who were completely exposed and without any air cover. Throughout the day, 155 aerial actions were carried out with the dropping of 700 tons of bombs, many of which were loaded with mustard gas, and 20,000 machine gun shots were fired. On the other hand, the Ethiopians hit 28 aircraft, shooting down one, at the end of the day the 15 Italians were killed against a thousand losses inflicted on the Ethiopians. Commenting on the end of the battle near Lake Ashenge, Alessandro Pavolini, who participated in the battle, wrote:

The history of war has seen countless other massacres, often much larger. But rarely has the slaughter been concentrated in such a limited time and space. [...] Struck by lightning, a generation lay on the paths of the plateau. The occupants marched with their mouths closed, careful not to stumble. The stench reduced the commands to the fewest possible number of syllables. And finally it was the plain, it was the prairie.

After the proclamation of the Empire, Magliocco became a close collaborator of Marshal Rodolfo Graziani who would elevate him to the rank of brigadier general and made him a deputy viceroy of the newly formed colony of Italian East Africa.

=== Death ===
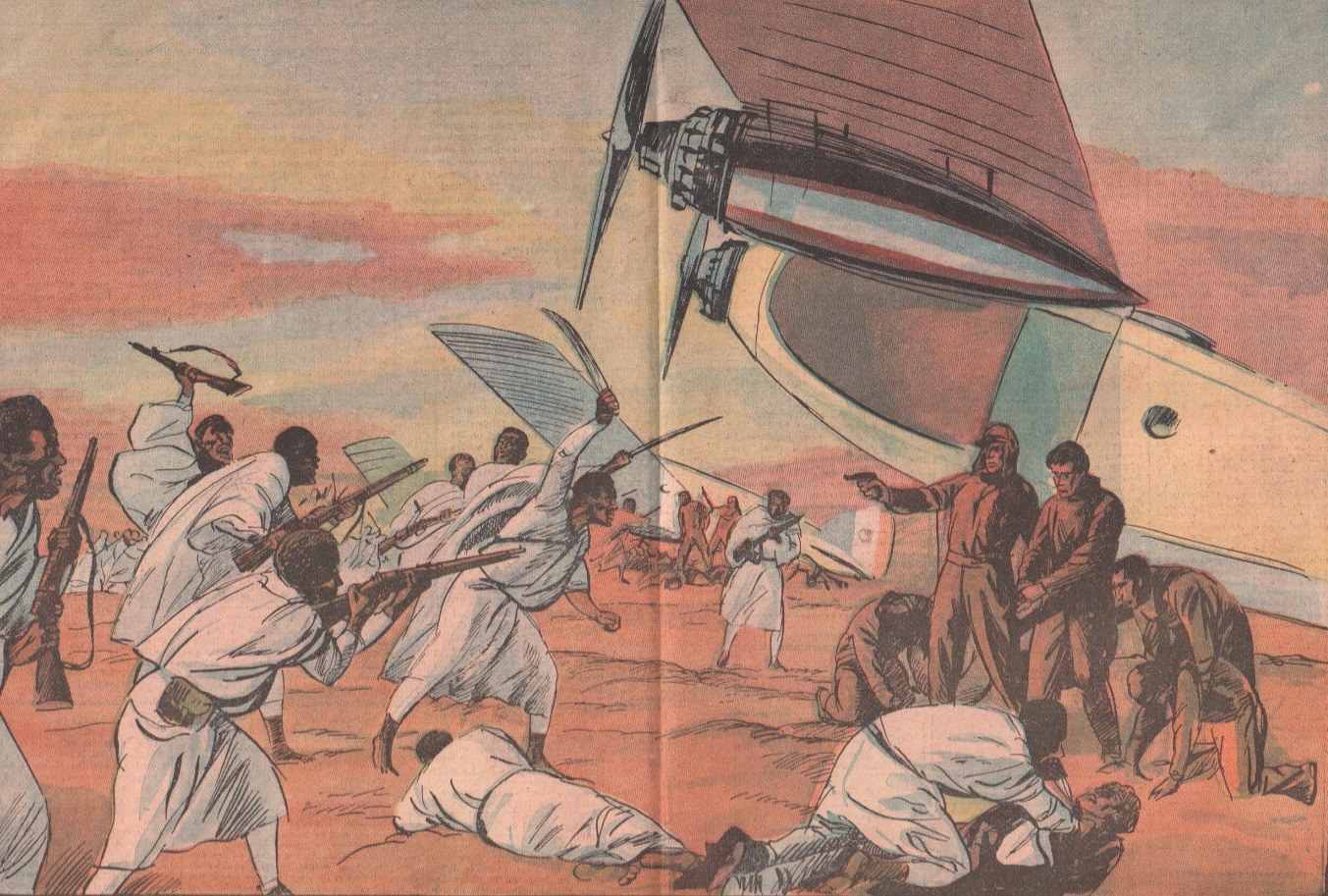
The Lechemti Massacre, illustration from Le Pèlerin, 26 July 1936

On 26 June 1936 Magliocco, serving as Deputy Chief of the Italian Royal Air Force and Deputy Viceroy of Italian East Africa, flew out of the airbase at Addis Ababa, leading two Caproni Ca.133 bombers and a IMAM Ro.1 reconnaissance aircraft, in order to meet with local leaders at Lechemti. The squadron, which contained thirteen Italian officials, including the famous aviator Antonio Locatelli, was charged with ensuring the loyalty of the town. After landing, twelve local soldiers arrived at the airbase to protect the crew, who subsequently set up camp around the aircraft.

During the night, the camp was attacked by Ethiopian guerrillas led by Keflè Nesibù and Belay Haileab. They set fire to the planes and killed all the Italians, except Father Borello, a Catholic priest that had joined to serve as a guide. Borello, who was able to witness the scene thanks to the fact that he had secluded himself in the woods a few dozen meters away, later reported that "there was almost no resistance. Some [Italians] remained trapped in the burning planes. Others attempted a defence, but were immediately shot down. As for the Galla guards who were supposed to protect us, they fled at the first shots."

Following what would become known as the "Lechemti Massacre," a retaliatory bombing campaign of the area for these losses, several of the men who died were posthumously awarded the Gold Medal of Military Valour, including Magliocco.

== Legacy ==
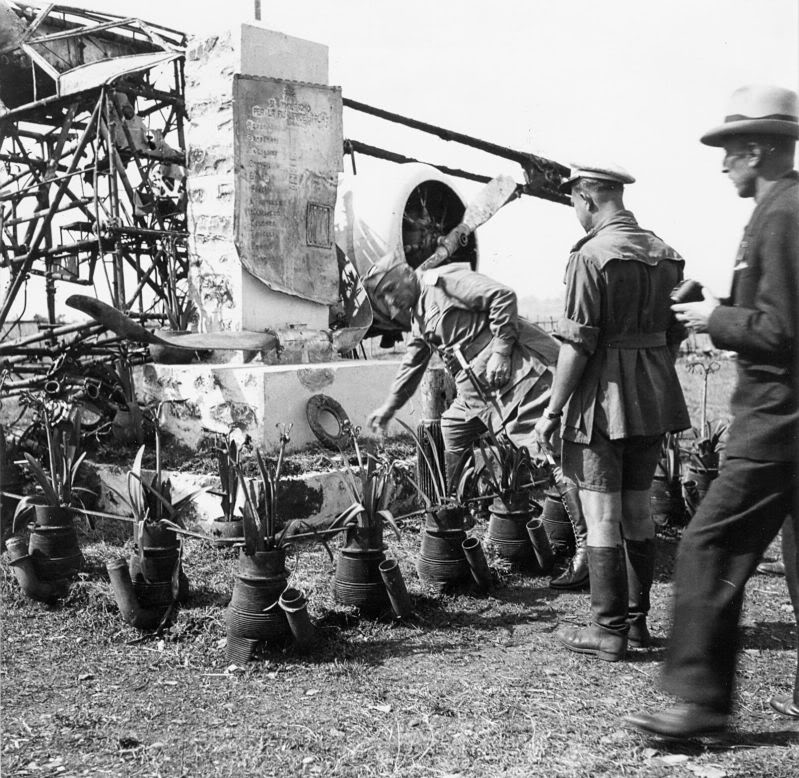
Memorial at Nekemte

The Caproni Ca.133 bombers were burned in the aftermath of the attack. The next day it was decided that one of the bombers would be converted to serve as a war memorial for the fallen men.

In the same year of Magliocco's death, 1936, the Magliocco Aerodromo was dedicated and named in his honor as the first Sicilian to become a general officer in the Italian Air Force. It would serve as a major airfield during WWII until allied bombing rendered it unusable. The airport would be renamed on 7 June 2014 after Pio La Torre.

There are also streets in Palermo and Milan named after Magliocco that have drawn criticism due to his support of fascism.
