= Alessandro Triulzi =

Italian historian and Africanist (born 1941)

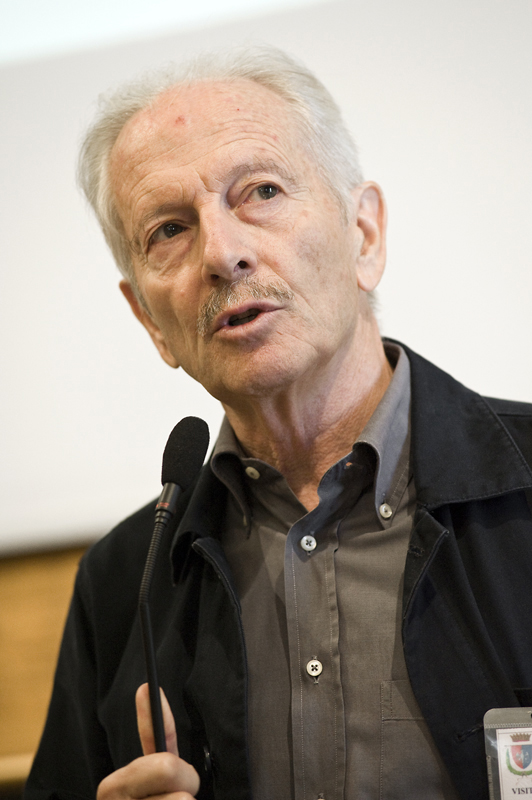
- Alessandro Triulzi at the festival "Biografia di un continente 1960-2010" Rome in 2010
- Born: 24 October 1941 (age 84); Rome, Kingdom of Italy
- Education: Sapienza University of Rome (MA); Northwestern University (PhD)
- Occupations: Historian; Africanist
- Years active: 1969–2011

Alessandro Triulzi (born 24 October 1941) is an Italian historian and Africanist.

== Early life and education ==
Alessandro Triulzi was born on 24 October 1941 in Rome.

He studied Political Science at the Sapienza University of Rome for a Master's degree in 1966 and obtained a PhD in History at Northwestern University at Evanston, Illinois in 1981.

== Career ==
Triulzi performed field work among the Ashanti people in Ghana (1969), and the Berta and Oromo people in Wallaga, West Ethiopia. He worked in Ethiopia, Sudan and Eritrea during 1970–1973, and again in Ethiopia during 1985–2005.

He taught at the University of Perugia (ethnology, 1972–1973) and the University of Naples "L'Orientale" (history of Sub-Saharan Africa, 1973–1985; history and institutions of Ethiopia, 1985–1998). Triulzi was Visiting Professor at the University of Addis Ababa (1994, 1998), the School for Advanced Studies in the Social Sciences in Paris (École des hautes études en sciences sociales, 2004), and Boston University (2008). From 1995 up to 2010 he coordinated the PhD program in African Studies at the University of Naples "L'Orientale".

Triulzi is an Advisory Board Member of AEGIS (Africa-Europe Group for Interdisciplinary Studies), a network of African studies academic centres in Europe. He researched various topics in African studies, ranging from the restructuring of post-colonial African states, colonial photography, the history of Ethiopia, to the recollection of Italy's colonial violence. In 2007 Triulzi was awarded the Premio Giorgio Maria Sangiorgi prize for the History and Ethnology of Africa by the Accademia dei Lincei.

He retired in 2011 and has since been Emeritus Professor of African History and former Vice Director of the African and Arab Studies Department at the Università degli Studi di Napoli "L'Orientale" at Naples.

== Publications ==
Triulzi published many scholarly books and research articles on Africa, including:

- Prelude to the history of a no man's land: Bela Shangul, Wallagga, Ethiopia (ca. 1800-1898), Dissertation, Northwestern University 1980.
- with Thomas Leiper Kane Collection (Library of Congress Hebraic Section): Salt, gold, and legitimacy : prelude to the history of a no-man's land, Belā Shangul, Wallaggā, Ethiopia (ca. 1800-1898), Istituto universitario orientale, Napoli 1981.
- Fotografia e storia dell’Africa, Napoli 1995.
- with P. T. W. Baxter, Jan Hultin: Being and becoming Oromo : historical and anthropological enquiries, Nordiska Afrikainstitutet; Red Sea Press, Inc., Uppsala, Lawrenceville, N.J. 1996.
- with M. Buttino and M. C. Ercolessi (Eds.): Uomini in armi. Costruzioni etniche e violenza politica, Napoli 2000.
- with W. James, D. Donham, O. Kurimoto (Eds.): Remapping Ethiopia: socialism & after, Oxford 2002.
- with M.C. Ercolessi (Eds): State, Power and New Political Actors in Postcolonial Africa, Fondazione Giangiacomo Feltrinelli, ANNALI, 38 (2002), Milano 2004.
- with T. Ta'a: Documents for Wallaga history: (1880s-1920s E.C.) Vol. 1 Amharic Texts, Addis Ababa 2004.
- Dopo la violenza. Costruzioni di memoria nel mondo contemporaneo, Napoli 2005.
- Il ritorno della memoria coloniale, dossier Afriche & Orienti 1, Asmara 2007.
- with Fikirte Inghida and others: Come un uomo sulla terra = Like a man on Earth, video documentary, Archives of Migrants Memories involving Asinitas, ZaLab and AAMOD. ZaLab, Padua, 2008
- with G. Barrera and Gabriel Tzeggai: Architettura e pianificazione urbana nei fondi dell'IsIAO (Istituto italiano per l'Africa e l'Oriente), Rome 2008.
- with Marco Carsetti: Come un uomo sulla terra, Rome 2009.
- with U. Chelati Dirat et al.: Pubblicazioni collettanee recenti: Colonia e postcolonia come spazi diasporici, Carocci 2011.
- with A. Mignemi, P. Bertella-Farnetti, and R. L. McKenzie: Long Journeys. African Migrants on the Road, Brill 2013.
- L’impero nel cassetto, Mimesis 2013.
- with Arnoldo Mosca Mondadori, Alfonso Cacciatore: Bibbia e Corano a Lampedusa, La Scuola 2014.
- with P. Di Luca and N. Cangi: Parole oltre le frontiere, Terre di Mezzo 2018.
