= Leqa Neqemte =

1841–1923 kingdom in western Ethiopia

Leqa Nekemte
- c.1841–1923
- Kingdom of Leqa Neqemte & some of its neighbors, 1885 C.E.
- Capital: Nekemte
- Common languages: Oromo
- Religion: Christianity; Waaqeffanna
- Government: Monarchy
  - 1888 to 1923: Kumsa Moroda (last)
- Historical era: Early modern period
  - Established: c.1841
  - Annexed by Ethiopian Empire: 1923
Succeeded by
Ethiopian Empire
- Today part of: Ethiopia

Leqa Nekemte (also known as Leqa Naqamtee) is a historical polity of the Leqa Oromo people, located in modern East Wellega. It was a dyadic-like state with the neighbouring Leqa Qellam located in Western Wellega, founded by Dejazmach Jote Tulu. The town of Nekemte, located in the heart of the region, was a significant center for trade, politics, and culture. Established in the mid-19th century, the polity grew in importance over the following decades as it developed into a strong hereditary dynasty with agricultural and military power.

== History ==
According to tradition, the Leqa settled in the Nekemte region in the mid-17th century. After settling, they began practicing mixed farming, which led to increased production. This, in turn, resulted in the development of a hierarchy of land rights and the stratification of society into more or less favored classes. The consequences of these phenomena brought about socio-economic and political transformations with far-reaching effects.

Before the formation of the Leqa Nekemte polity, the Leqa had their ritual center at Nekemte under the leadership of Fido Bookkisaa, who belonged to the Waayyuu clan of the Leqa. After Bekere Godana was elected abbaa duulaa of the Maýa lineage group, he disregarded the basic principles of the gadaa system and undermined Fido's authority. Eventually, Bakaree forced Fido to Diggaa in the west, establishing his residence at Waóa, which became the first nucleus of Nekemte town.

Bekere Godana established and developed an agriculturally resourceful polity, called Leqa Nekemte, centered around the small town of Nekemte. This polity established a strong hereditary dynasty that successfully survived Menelik's conquest. However, Nekemte had long served as an important gadaa center for the Leqa well before the emergence of the polity. Known in Afan Oromo as Nekemte, literally "Betrothed", the town was, according to local tradition, founded by Bakaree Godaana (circa 1801–1871), the first Oromo ruler of Leqa, who established a market in the area. On that occasion, he ordered the preparation of a great feast for which numerous bulls were killed. The elders and many of the inhabitants gathered, and amid great rejoicing, he is said to have declared, "I have opened this market for you. Exchange your goods in it and make profit by your commerce. Let this market stand forever". The settlement continued to be used by Bakaree's son and his successor Moroda (1844–1888), who accepted Christianity and paid tribute first to King Tekle Haymanot of Gojjam and later to Menelik of Shewa. Through diplomacy and conquest, Moroda gained supremacy over Gimbi, Haaruu, Argoo, Naggoo, Gaarsoo, Baabboo, Mandii, and other areas. Moroda peacefully accepted the overlordship of Emperor Menelik II, which helped him secure special autonomy for Leqa Nekemte. Nekemte was also the residence also of Moroda's son and heir Kumsa (1871–1923), who was likewise subject to Menelik. Kumsa then converted to Christianity and adopted the name of Gebre-Egziabher and the title of Dejazmatch.

Due to its wealth and control over major trade routes to Fadasi, including Qumbaabii, the largest trade center of the Leqa Oromo west of the Birbir River, the Mahdists invaded its territory at the end of 1886. The Mahdist invasion of Leqa territory was unsuccessful as they approached Ras Gobana Dacche, Menelik's famous general, for help, who forced the former to withdraw. The Mahdist second invasion was finally repulsed by the combined forces of Ras Gobana and Moroda Bakaree of Leqa Qellem in 1888 at the Battle of Guté Dili.
