= Land reform in Ethiopia =

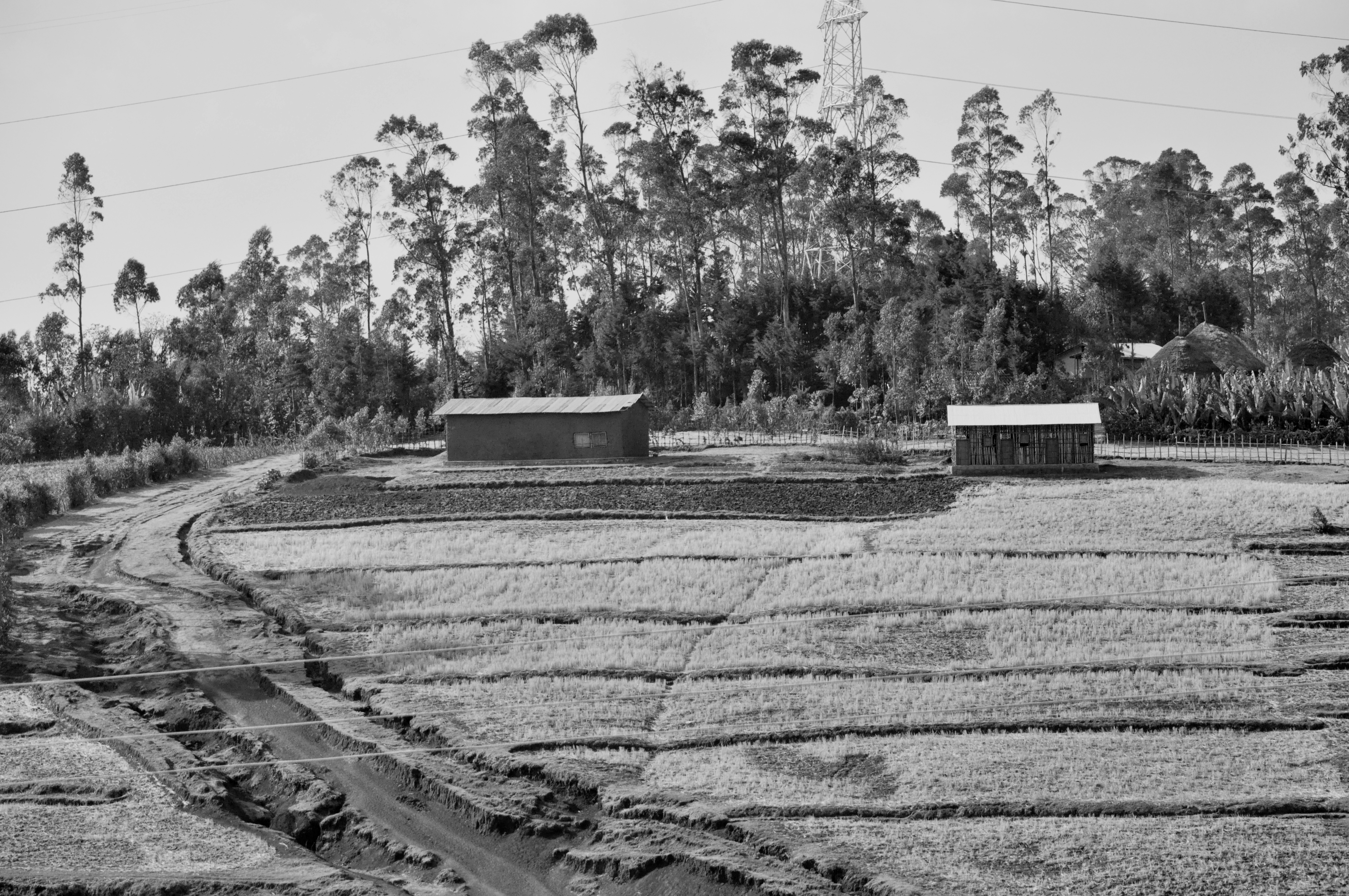
Farmer's field in Ethiopia

The problem of land reform in Ethiopia has hampered that country's economic development throughout the late 19th and 20th centuries. Attempts to modernize land ownership by giving title either to the peasants who till the soil, or to large-scale farming programs, have been tried under imperial rulers like Emperor Haile Selassie, and under Marxist regimes like the Derg, with mixed results. The present Constitution of Ethiopia, which was put into force January 1995, vests land ownership exclusively "in the State and in the peoples of Ethiopia." The relevant section continues, "Land is a common property of the Nations, Nationalities and Peoples of Ethiopia and shall not be subject to sale or to other means of exchange." Despite these different approaches to land reform, Ethiopia still faces issues of sustainable food self-sufficiency.

== Background ==
Prior to the 1974 Ethiopian Revolution, Ethiopia had a complex land tenure system. In Wollo Province, for example, there were an estimated 111 types of land tenure. The existence of so many land tenure systems, coupled with the lack of reliable data, has made it difficult to give a comprehensive assessment of landownership in Ethiopia. However, the tenure system can be understood in a rudimentary way if one examines it in the context of the basic distinction between landownership patterns in the north and those in the south.

Historically, Ethiopia was divided into the northern highlands, which constituted the core of the old Christian kingdom, and the southern highlands, most of which were brought under imperial rule by conquest. This north-south distinction was reflected in land tenure differences. In the northern regions—particularly Gojjam, Begemder and Semien (called Gondar after 1974), Tigray, highland Eritrea, parts of Wollo, and northern Shewa—the major form of ownership was a type of communal system known as rist. According to this system, all descendants (both male and female) of an individual founder were entitled to a share, and individuals had the right to use (a usufruct right) a plot of family land. Rist was hereditary, inalienable, and inviolable. No user of any piece of land could sell his or her share outside the family or mortgage or bequeath his or her share as a gift, as the land belonged not to the individual but to the descent group. Most peasants in the northern highlands held at least some rist land, but there were some members belonging to minority ethnic groups who were tenant farmers.

The other major form of tenure was gult, an ownership right acquired from the monarch or from provincial rulers who were empowered to make land grants. Gult owners collected tribute from the peasantry and, until 1966 (when gult rights were abolished in principle), exacted labor service as payment in kind from the peasants. Until the government instituted salaries in the twentieth century, gult rights were the typical form of compensation for an official.

Other forms of tenure included samon, mengist, and maderia land. Samon was land the government had granted to the Ethiopian Orthodox Church in perpetuity. Traditionally, the church had claimed about one-third of Ethiopia's land; however, actual ownership probably never reached this figure. Estimates of church holdings Ahmed range from 10 - 20% of the country's cultivated land. Peasants who worked on church land paid tribute to the church (or monastery) rather than to the emperor. The state owned large tracts of agricultural land known as mengist and maderia. Mengist was land registered as government property, and maderia was land granted mainly to government officials, war veterans, and other patriots in lieu of a pension or salary. Although it granted maderia land for life, the state possessed a reversionary right over all land grants; this form of tenure comprised about 12% of the country's agricultural land. Maderia tenure became a far more common following the Second World War, as Emperor Haile Selassie used it to reward the arbegnoch (or "Patriots") who had fought the Italian occupiers.

In general, absentee landlordism in the north was rare, and landless tenants were few. For instance, tenancy in Begemder and Semien and in Gojjam was estimated at 2% of holdings. In the southern provinces, however, few farmers owned the land on which they worked. Southern landownership patterns developed as a result of land measurement and land grants following the Ethiopian conquest of the region in the late nineteenth and early twentieth centuries. After the conquest, officials divided southern land equally among the state, the church, and the indigenous population. Warlords who administered the occupied regions received the state's share. They, in turn, redistributed part of their share to their officers and soldiers. The government distributed the church's share among the church hierarchy in the same manner. Officials divided the rest between the traditional leaders (balabat) and the indigenous people. Thus, the loss of two-thirds of the land to the new landlords and the church made many local people tenants (gebbars). Tenancy in the southern provinces ranged between 65% and 80% of the holdings, and tenant payments to landowners averaged as high as 50% of the produce.

In the lowland periphery and the Great Rift Valley, the traditional practice of transhumance and the allocation of pastoral land according to tribal custom remained undisturbed until after World War II. These two areas are inhabited by pastoralists, including the Afar and Issa in eastern Eritrea, Wollo, and Hararghe; the Somali in the Ogaden; the Borana in Sidamo and Bale; and the Karayu in the Great Rift Valley area of Shewa. The pastoral social structure is based on a kinship system with strong interclan connections; grazing and water rights are regulated by custom.

== Landownership under Haile Selassie up to the Revolution ==
Until the 1950s, this pastoral life remained largely undisturbed by the highlanders, who intensely disliked the hot and humid lowland climate and feared malaria. Beginning in the 1950s, however, the malaria eradication programs made irrigation agriculture in these areas possible. The government's desire to promote such agriculture, combined with its policy of creating new tax revenues, put pressure on many pastoralists, especially the Afar and the Somali. Major concessionaires, such as the Tendaho Cotton Plantation (managed until the 1974 revolution by the British firm Mitchell Cotts) and the Wonji Sugar Plantation (managed by HVA, a Dutch company), was granted large tracts of traditional Afar and Arsi grazing land and converted them into large-scale commercial farms. The loss of grazing land to these concessions significantly affected traditional migration patterns for grazing and water.

In the northern and southern parts of Ethiopia, peasant farmers lacked the means to improve production because of the fragmentation of holdings, a lack of credit, and the absence of modern facilities. Particularly in the south, the insecurity of tenure and high rents killed the peasants' incentive to improve production. Further, those attempts by the Imperial government to improve the peasant's title to their land were often met with suspicion. One example was the 1968 Gojjam revolt, where the peasants successfully resisted government efforts to survey their lands, believing that it would increase the taxes levied by local corrupt officials.

By the mid-1960s, many sectors of Ethiopian society favored land reform. University students led the land reform movement and campaigned against the government's reluctance to introduce land reform programs and the lack of commitment to integrated rural development. By 1974 it was clear that the archaic land tenure system was one of the major factors responsible for the backward condition of Ethiopia's agriculture and the onset of the revolution. On March 4, 1975, the Derg announced its land reform program. The government nationalized rural land without compensation, abolished tenancy, forbade the hiring of wage labor on private farms, ordered all commercial farms to remain under state control, and granted each peasant family so-called "possessing rights" to a plot of land not to exceed ten hectares. The Ethiopian Church lost all its land, and its clergy and lay people had to rely on stipends from the Derg to live.

Tenant farmers in southern Ethiopia, where the average tenancy was as high as 55% and rural elites exploited farmers, welcomed the land reform. But in the northern highlands, where rist tenures dominated and large holdings and tenancy were exceptions, many people resisted land reform. Despite the special provision for communal areas (Article 19 of the proclamation gave peasants in the communal areas "possessing rights" to the land they were tilling at the time of the proclamation) and the Derg's efforts to reassure farmers that land reform would not affect them negatively, northerners remained suspicious of the new government's intentions. The reform held no promise of gain for most northerners; rather, many northern farmers perceived land reform as an attack on their rights to rist land. Resistance intensified when Zemecha members campaigned for collectivization of land and oxen.

Land reform had the least impact on the lowland peripheries, where nomads traditionally maintained their claims over grazing lands. The new proclamation gave them rights of possession to land they used for grazing. Therefore, the nomads did not perceive the new program as a threat. However, in the Afar area of the lower Awash Valley, where large-scale commercial estates had thrived, there was opposition to land reform, led mainly by tribal leaders (and large landowners), such as Alimirah Hanfadhe the Sultan of Aussa.

The land reform destroyed the feudal order; changed landowning patterns, particularly in the south, in favor of peasants and small landowners; and provided the opportunity for peasants to participate in local matters by permitting them to form associations. However, problems associated with declining agricultural productivity and poor farming techniques still were prevalent.

Government attempts to implement land reform also created problems related to land fragmentation, insecurity of tenure and former tenants, and shortages of farm inputs and tools. Peasant associations often were periodically compelled to redistribute land to accommodate young families or new households moving into their area. The process meant not only smaller farms but also the fragmentation of holdings, which were often scattered into small plots to give families land of comparable quality. Consequently, individual holdings were frequently far smaller than the permitted maximum allotment of ten hectares. A 1979 study showed that around Addis Ababa individual holdings ranged from 1.0 to 1.6 hectares and that about 48 percent of the parcels were less than one-fourth of a hectare in size. Another study, of Dejen awraja (subregion) in Gojjam, found that land fragmentation had been exacerbated since the revolution. For example, during the pre-reform period, sixty-one out of 200 farmer respondents owned three or four parcels of land; after the reform, the corresponding number was 135 farmers. The insecurity of the tenants was the most prevalent problem especially in areas where few strong landlords dominate both the political and economic environments of the region. In some areas such as Gojam and Begemidir (later called Gondar), where there was strongholds of Orthodox Church and royal landlords, the tenants who got plots of land were attacked by the landlord families. Those tenants who got new farmlands were secretly submitting gifts to landlord family and the church until some measurements were taken by the regime. Some farmers such as handcraft workers who fear the hidden bitter hands of the former landlords fled to the nearby towns;others made a deal with their former landlords and employers.

The second problem related to security of tenure, which was threatened by increasing pressure to redistribute land and to collectivize farms. Many peasants were reluctant to improve their land because they were afraid that they would not receive adequate compensation for upgrades. The third problem developed as a result of the military government's failure to provide farmers with basic items like seeds, oxen, and fertilizer. For instance, one study of four communities in different parts of Ethiopia found that up to 50 percent of the peasants in some areas lacked oxen and about 40 percent did not have plows.

== Government Rural Programs ==
In 1984 the founding congress of the Workers' Party of Ethiopia emphasized the need for a coordinated strategy based on socialist principles to accelerate agricultural development. To implement this strategy, the government relied on peasant associations and rural development, cooperatives and state farms, resettlement and villagization, increased food production, and a new marketing policy.

=== Peasant Associations and Rural Development ===
Articles 8 and 10 of the 1975 Land Reform Proclamation required that peasants be organized into a hierarchy of associations that would facilitate the implementation of rural development programs and policies. Accordingly, after the land reform announcement, the government mobilized more than 60,000 students to organize peasants into associations. By the end of 1987, there were 20,367 peasant associations with a membership of 5.7 million farmers. Each association covered an area of 800 hectares, and members included tenants, landless laborers, and landowners holding fewer than ten hectares. Former landowners who had held more than ten hectares of land could join an association only after the completion of land redistribution. An umbrella organization known as the All-Ethiopia Peasants' Association represented local associations. Peasant associations assumed a wide range of responsibilities, including implementation of government land use directives; adjudication of land disputes; encouragement of development programs, such as water and land conservation; construction of schools, clinics, and cooperatives; organization of defense squads; and tax collection. Peasant associations also became involved in organizing forestry programs, local service and production cooperatives, road construction, and data collection projects, such as the 1984 census.

=== Cooperatives and State Farms ===
Starting in 1976, the government encouraged farmers to form cooperatives. Between 1978 and 1981, the Derg issued a series of proclamations and directives outlining procedures for the formation of service cooperatives and producers' cooperatives. Service cooperatives provided basic services, such as the sale of farm inputs and consumer items that were often rationed, the provision of loans, the education of peasant association members in socialist philosophy, and the promotion of cottage industries.

The producers' cooperatives alleviated shortages of inputs (because farmers could pool resources) and problems associated with the fragmentation of landholdings. The government ordered the creation of these cooperatives because of its belief that small farmers were inefficient and were unable to take advantage of economies of scale.

The producers' cooperatives developed in three stages. The first stage was the melba, an elementary type of cooperative that required members to pool land (with the exception of plots of up to 2,000 square meters, which could be set aside for private use) and to share oxen and farm implements. The second stage, welba, required members to transfer their resources to the cooperative and reduce private plots to 1,000 square meters. The third stage, the weland, abolished private land use and established advanced forms of cooperatives, whose goal was to use mechanized farming with members organized into production brigades. Under this system, income would be distributed based on labor contributions.

The government provided a number of inducements to producers' cooperatives, including priority for credits, fertilizers, improved seed, and access to consumer items and building materials. According to the ten-year plan, more than half of the country's cultivated land would be organized into producers' cooperatives by 1994. Despite the incentives, farmers responded less than enthusiastically. They saw the move to form cooperatives as a prelude to the destruction of their "family farms." By 1985/86 there were only 2,323 producers' cooperatives, of which only 255 were registered. Some critics argued that the resistance of farmers caused the government to formulate its resettlement and villagization programs.

A major component of the Derg's agricultural policy was the development of large-scale state farms. Following the 1975 land reform, the Derg converted a majority of the estimated 75,000 hectares of large, commercial farms owned by individuals and cooperatives into state farms; not long afterwards, the government expanded their size. By 1987/88 there were about 216,000 hectares of state farmland, accounting for 3.3% of the total cultivated area. The ten-year plan indicated that state farms would be expanded to 468,000 hectares by 1994, accounting for 6.4% of the cultivated land.

The primary motive for the expansion of state farms was the desire to reverse the drop in food production that has continued since the revolution. After the 1975 land reform, peasants began withholding grain from the market to drive up prices because government price-control measures had created shortages of consumer items such as coffee, cooking oil, salt, and sugar. Additionally, increased peasant consumption caused shortages of food items such as teff, wheat, corn, and other grains in urban areas. The problem became so serious that Mengistu Haile Mariam, the chairman of the Derg, lashed out against the peasantry on the occasion of the fourth anniversary of military rule in September 1978, criticizing them for their capitalist mentality and their petit bourgeois tendencies. Mengistu and his advisers believed that state farms would produce grain for urban areas and raw materials for domestic industry and would also increase production of cash crops such as coffee to generate badly needed foreign exchange. Accordingly, state farms received a large share of the country's resources for agriculture; from 1982 to 1990, this totaled about 43% of the government's agricultural investment. In 1983 state farms received 76% of the total allocation of chemical fertilizers, 95% of the improved seeds, and 81% of agricultural credit. In terms of subsidies, between 1982/83 and 1985/86 the various state farm corporations received more than 90 million Birr in direct subsidies. Despite the emphasis on state farms, state farm production accounted for only 6% of total agricultural output in 1987 (although meeting 65% of urban needs), leaving peasant farmers responsible for over 90% of production.

=== Resettlement and villagization ===
The policy of encouraging voluntary resettlement went back to 1958, when the government established the first known planned resettlement in Sidamo. Shortly after the 1974 revolution, it became Derg policy to accelerate resettlement. By 1986 the government had resettled more than 600,000 people to three settlement areas. After a brief halt to the program in response to international pressure, the program resumed in 1987. Western donors and governments expressed fears that the resettlement plans would strain the country's finances, would depopulate areas of resistance, would weaken the guerrillas' support base and deny them access to recruits, would violate human rights through lack of medical attention. Although many of these charges were valid, some criticisms may have been unfounded.

In 1985 the government initiated a new relocation program known as "villagization". The objectives of the program, which grouped scattered farming communities throughout the country into small village clusters, were to promote rational land use; conserve resources; provide access to clean water and to health and education services; and strengthen security. Government guidelines stipulated that villages were to house 200 to 300 households. By March 1986, about 4.6 million people in Shewa, Arsi, and Harerge had been relocated into more than 4,500 villages. Although the government had villagized about 13 million people by 1989, international criticism, deteriorating security conditions, and lack of resources doomed the plan to failure.

Opponents of villagization argued that the scheme was disruptive to agricultural production because the government moved many farmers during the planting and harvesting seasons. There also was concern that villagization could have a negative impact on fragile local resources, particularly on water and grazing land; accelerate the spread of communicable diseases; and increase problems with plant pests and diseases. In early 1990, the government essentially abandoned villagization when it announced new economic policies that called for free-market reforms and a relaxation of centralized planning.

== See also ==
- Agriculture in Ethiopia
