= Antonio Locatelli =

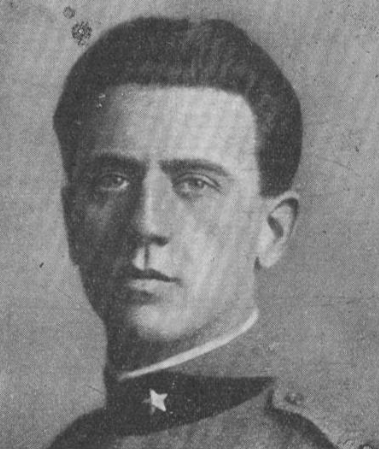

Podestà of Bergamo
- In office 27 November 1933 – 2 August 1934
- Preceded by: Grismondo Trainieri
- Succeeded by: Pietro David

Member of the Chamber of Deputies
- In office 24 May 1924 – 21 January 1929
- Constituency: Bergamo

Personal details
- Born: 19 April 1895 Bergamo, Kingdom of Italy
- Died: 27 June 1936 (aged 41) Nekemte, Ethiopian Empire
- Party: National Fascist Party
- Awards: Gold Medal of Military Valour (3); Silver Medal of Military Valour (3); Knight of the Military Order of Savoy

Military service
- Allegiance: Kingdom of Italy
- Branch/service: Royal Italian Army; Regia Aeronautica
- Rank: Major
- Battles/wars: First World War (POW); Second Italo-Ethiopian War †

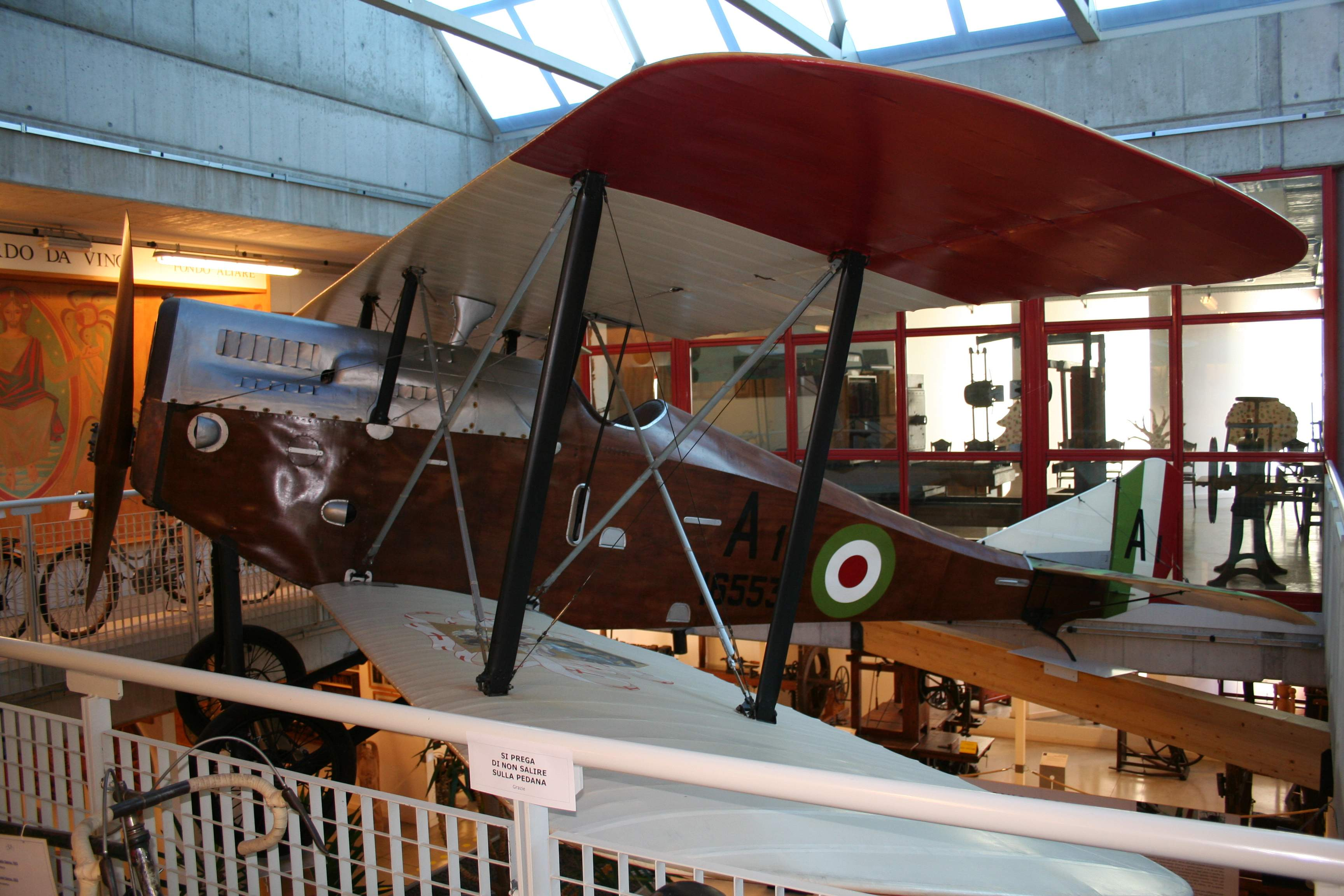
Locatelli's 1918 Ansaldo A.1 Balilla aircraft, at the Museo storico di Bergamo

Antonio Locatelli (19 April 1895 – 27 June 1936) was a pioneering Italian aviator and National Fascist Party legislator. He served in Gabriele d'Annunzio's air squadron during the First World War and was decorated for his role in the famous Flight over Vienna. In 1924, he attempted a transatlantic flight but was forced down into the seas off Greenland, whence he was rescued. After this, he became a deputy to Parliament and the Podestà of Bergamo. He was killed during the Second Italo-Ethiopian War.

== Early life ==
Locatelli was the son of Samuel Locatelli and Anna Gelfi, a family of modest financial standing in Bergamo, Italy. From 1908 until his graduation in 1913, he attended the Bergamo Industrial Institute. He was a keen mountaineer in his youth, climbing the Adamello, Trentino, with his brother Carlo. He then became chief technician at the Ansaldo di Cornigliano Ligure.

== Aviator ==
Having joined a flying unit of the army, Locatelli was granted his pilot's license in 1915. He went on to fly 523 sorties during World War I, starting out in reconnaissance and then flying fighters and bombers. He was particularly celebrated for performing solo reconnaissance over Zepellin yards in Friedrichshafen and flying over Vienna on 9 August 1918. He was subsequently downed and captured by the Austrians, spending some time at Sigmundsherberg POW camp. In recognition of his valour, he received gold and silver medals and was made a knight of the Military Order of Savoy.

== Attempted circumnavigation ==
Locatelli led Italy's attempt to achieve the first aerial circumnavigation during the 1924 scramble by six nations to achieve the feat. Flying a metal-hulled Dornier Do J Wal flying boat, powered by two Rolls-Royce engines and with a crew of three (Lt. Tullio Crosio, copilot, Lts. Giovanni Branni and Bruno Farcinelli, engineers), he left Pisa, Italy, on 25 July 1924, heading west. Locatelli's attempt came to an end on 21 August when heavy fog forced a landing 120 miles short of Greenland. Damage sustained to the plane's engine carriers precluded the resumption of the flight. Four days earlier, he had met up with the American team led by Lowell Smith, who were to be ultimately successful in setting the record, in Reykjavík, and had intended to accompany them on the circumnavigation. It was this chance meeting which ultimately saved their lives as the Americans raised the alarm when Locatelli failed to arrive in Greenland and the USS Richmond (CL-9) found them after a search by a flotilla of craft.

== Politics ==
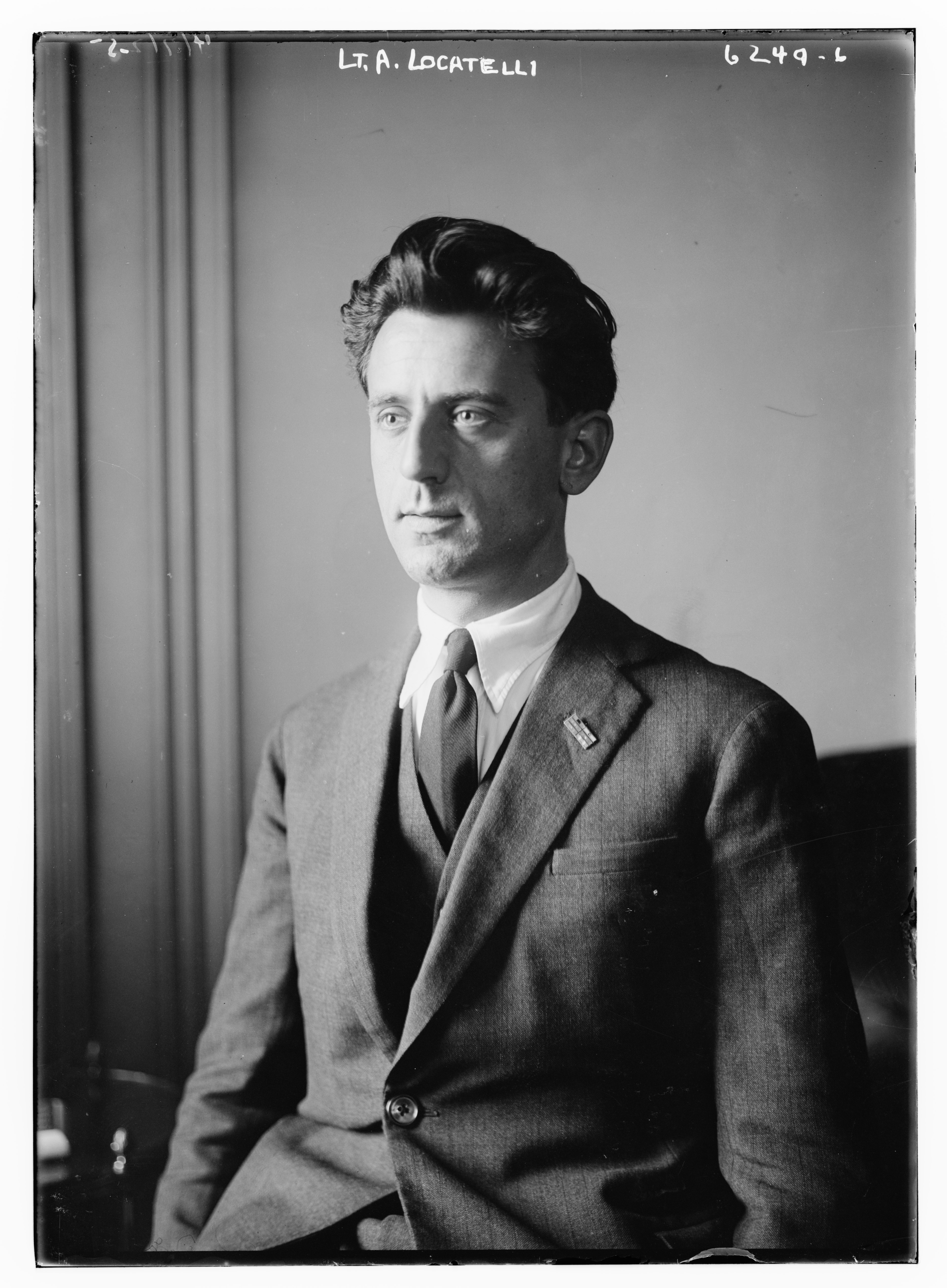
Locatelli in the 1920s as a member of Parliament

From 1924 to 1928, Locatelli served as a member of the Parliament of the Kingdom of Italy, where he focused primarily on aviation policy. He strongly criticized the government for what he considered insufficient support for aviation development compared with other countries. During this period, the aviation administration was reorganized: in 1925 the Aeronautics Commission was elevated to a ministry headed by Benito Mussolini, with General Alberto Bonzani as undersecretary, later replaced by Italo Balbo, who became minister in 1929. Locatelli's criticisms—particularly regarding outdated aircraft and the shortage of trained pilots—caused friction with the authorities, notably after a 1926 letter to a congress of retired pilots that offended Bonzani.

Locatelli later participated in the reorganization of the Italian Express Airline, which operated the Brindisi–Athens–Constantinople route. Although initially supported by the Ministry of Aeronautics under Balbo, he was dismissed for "indiscipline." After his dismissal, he sued the company, while other Italian aviation firms distanced themselves from him following the publication in the Parisian exile newspaper La Libertà (22 January 1928) of his earlier critical letter about Bonzani. In the same year, he requested to join the search for Umberto Nobile, missing at the North Pole after the crash of the airship Italia, but his request was denied. Like several famous wartime aviators—sometimes called the “senators of the air”—Locatelli was gradually marginalized as Italian aviation came to be dominated by Balbo's emphasis on large "collective flights." He was also not renominated by the National Fascist Party in the 1929 elections, despite support from Giacomo Suardo and Aldo Finzi.

During the early 1930s, Locatelli lived between Rome and Bergamo, facing financial difficulties but remaining active in artistic circles, exhibiting graphic works and paintings. Beginning in 1929, he contributed two articles per month to Corriere della Sera and became director of La Rivista di Bergamo. He also served as president of the Bergamo section of the Club Alpino Italiano. After a brief recall to service in 1932, the air force promoted him to major for exceptional merit on 17 May 1935. On 27 November 1933, he was appointed mayor of Bergamo, assisted by the lawyer Gino Rota. During his tenure, he promoted plans for the redevelopment of the city's upper town based on a project by Luigi Angelini, securing a bank loan for the initiative. However, the following year, he resigned due to a law preventing unmarried men from holding public office and because of disagreements with the local Fascist leadership.

== Second Italo-Ethiopian War ==
With the declaration of war on Ethiopia on 7 January 1936, Locatelli left as a volunteer for Mogadishu, assigned to the reconnaissance and bombing air force. In Ethiopia, he made the first liaison flight between the Somali and Eritrean fronts, from Gorrahei to the Danakil Desert.

In the letters he sent to his mother between March and May 1936, Locatelli described his war experience. Below are some excerpts from his diary:

"A huge job. We are in full offensive […] I have already flown 4 times over Harrar, 5 over Jiggiga, twice over Dire Dawa and I have dropped bombs with a precision that you can admire from my photographs taken with the Leica […]. The enemy is putting up resistance in the centre, but we are keeping them bombed so that they can no longer show themselves in the light of day, they will be routed, exterminated and if they want to resist they will run the risk of dying of hunger. Do you know that they cannot move a lorry without us knowing and bombing it? In short, it is unique fun in spite of our English friends who will have a stomach ache at all the news of our overwhelming actions, and especially at knowing that on Lake Tana they are already sculpting a gigantic figure of the Duce in granite. (Gorrahei 23 March)

"Three mornings in a row, the 22nd, 23rd, and today the 24th, I bombed Jiggiga […] it is the most important city, from a military point of view, of the whole war on this chessboard of Somalia because it has a large entrenched camp around it and above all because the English pigs have sent all the war material to Jiggiga for our enemies, both the Somali and Eritrean fronts. When I saw the bombs hitting the houses, destroying (with flights of shrapnel, livestock and stones), setting fire to the town in many places at the same time, I who usually feel a little pity for the enemy, rejoiced above all because I thought I was indirectly hitting the English organisation [...]. (Gorrahei 24 March 1936)

"He will tell you everything that is difficult to write, he will tell you about our life that he lived doing more than his duty with the heart and spirit of a Bergamo native. […] I am entrusting him with 11 small drawings, 23 large and 31 small photographs, so I am sure that everything will arrive regularly by hand […]. Those with the words 'Corriere della sera' written on them could be delivered by hand by Cesareni to Dr. Rizzini who is the editor-in-chief and acts as Director. […] The one about Harrar burning must not leave our house. (Gorrahei 28 April 1936, on the return of one of his flight companions)

"I am happy to have once again been able to give my heart and soul to a great Italian cause. It seems like a dream, yet it is the path to the Empire that opens up for Italy." (Assab, 7 May 1936, after following the proclamation of the Empire live on the radio)

=== Death ===
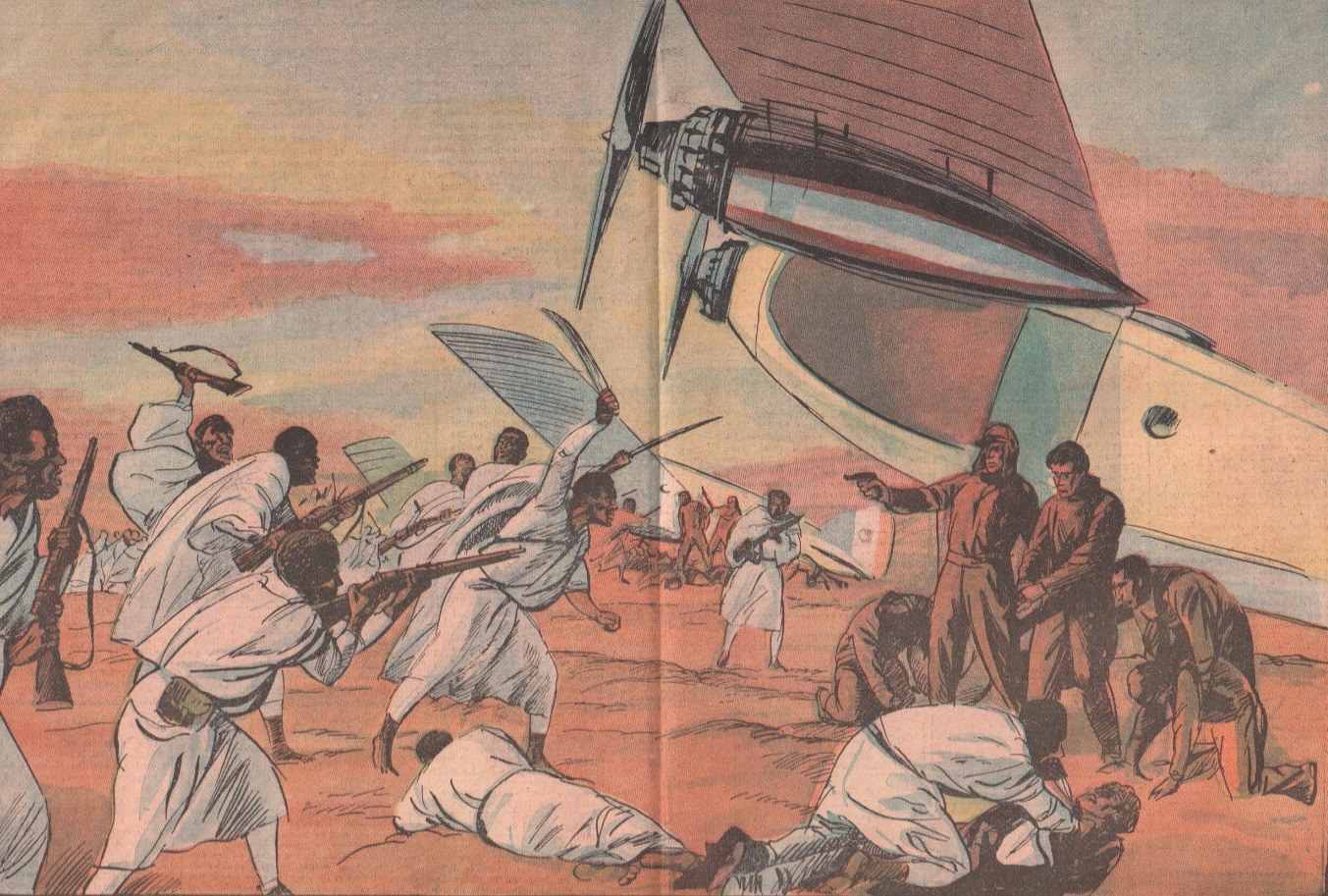
The Lechemti Massacre, illustration from Le Pèlerin, 26 July 1936

After the capture of Addis Ababa and the proclamation of the Empire, Locatelli was tasked by Marshal Rodolfo Graziani to fly to Nekemte, in the far west of the country, to receive the submission of a local Oromo leader. Locatelli departed for Nekemte with Air Brigadier General Vincenzo Magliocco on 26 June with three aircraft. After landing, the crew set up camp around the aircraft. During the night, the camp was attacked by Ethiopian guerrillas led by Keflè Nesibù and Belay Haileab. They set fire to the planes and killed all the Italians, except Father Borello, who was able to witness the scene thanks to the fact that he had secluded himself in the woods a few dozen meters away. Borello later reported that "there was almost no resistance. Some [Italians] remained trapped in the burning planes. Others attempted a defence, but were immediately shot down. As for the Galla guards who were supposed to protect us, they fled at the first shots."

After the discovery of the Lechemti massacre, Locatelli and the other members of the crew were awarded the Gold Medal of Military Valor. Many memorials were set up after his death, especially around his native Bergamo. These sites have since become focal points for neo-fascists.

== Memorials ==
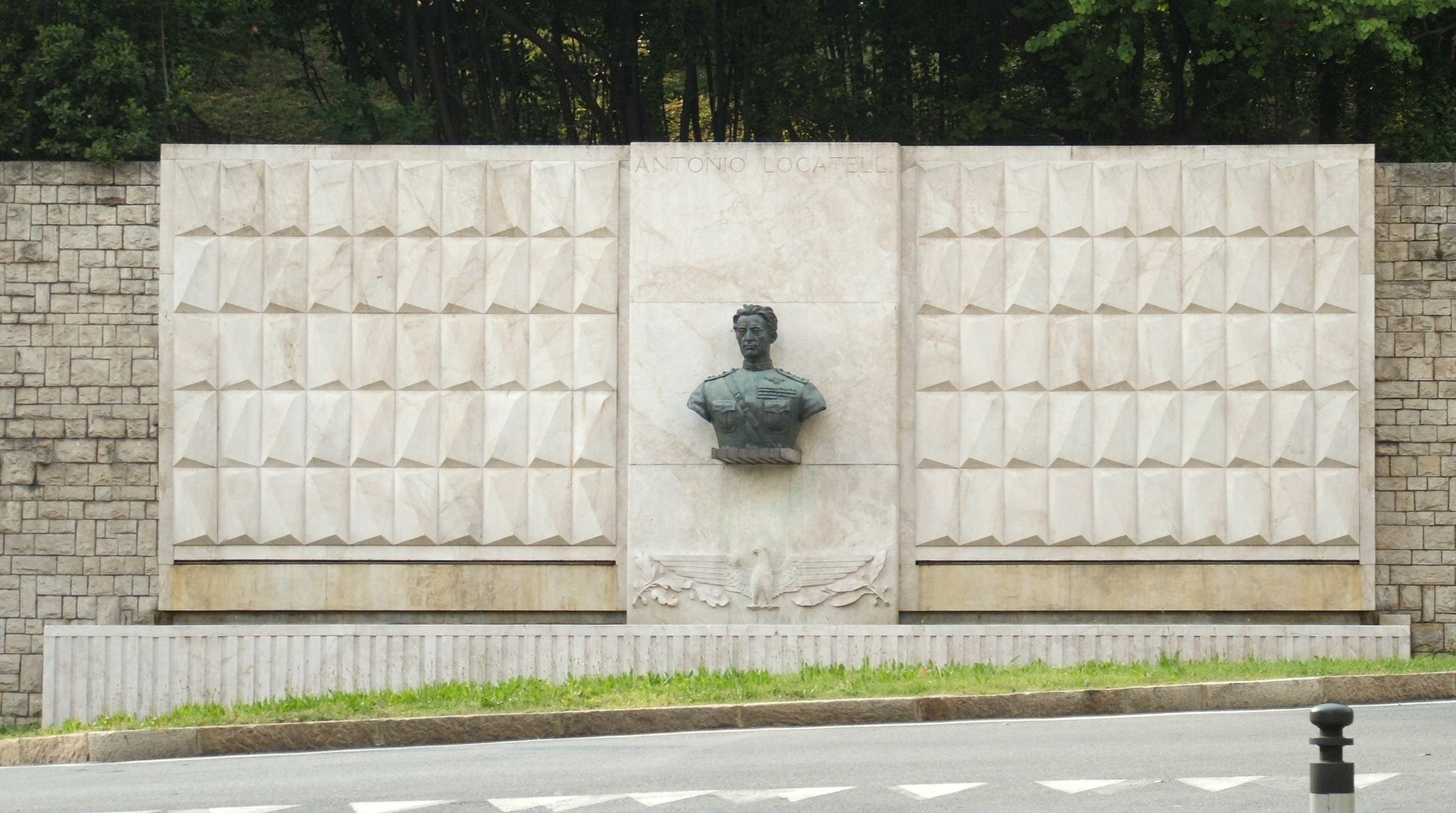
Monument to Antonio Locatelli in Bergamo

The following were dedicated to the memory of Antonio Locatelli:

- Via Antonio Locatelli and the rationalist style fountain with an aviator's bust, Bergamo
- a bronze bust at the 3rd AVES "Aquila" Regiment, Orio al Serio
- a bust by Giovanni Avogadro located in the Torre dei Caduti, Bergamo
- the Bergamo Section Antonio Locatelli of the Italian Alpine Club
- Antonio Locatelli Primary School, Cavernago
- Antonio Locatelli Hut in Tre Cime di Lavaredo Natural Park
