= Neftenya =

Name given to colonial Amhara warriors in Ethiopia

A neftenya (Amharic: ነፍጠኛ, lit. 'rifle bearer') was the name given to Emperor Menelik II's warriors, who were primarily of Shewan Amhara origin, that expanded into and colonized large tracts of what is today southern Ethiopia during the Agar Maqnat. In its literal meaning, neftenya, referred to riflemen in the Imperial Ethiopian Army who were known to have settled in Ethiopia's peripheral regions, including parts of present-day Oromia Region, the Former SNNPR, Gambela Region and the Benishangul-Gumuz Region from the late 19th century onwards. The origin of this term lies from the fact that these soldiers, i.e. "neftenya", were granted land on these newly conquered territories, including the services of the indigenous people on these lands, as rewards for their services.

The Shewan conquerors that were described as neftenya were originally a group of aristocratic rulers of the Kingdom of Shewa who were high ranking members of Menelik II's Royal Court and their soldiers. While upper class Amhara who came to the south as conquerors originated from all parts of the northern highlands, all came as vassals of the specifically Shewan state.

A system of imperial conquest effectively based on settler colonialism, involving the deployment of armed settlers in newly created military colonies, was widespread throughout the southern and western territories that came under Menelik's dominion. Under the 'Neftenya-Gabbar scheme' the Ethiopian Empire had developed a relatively effective system of occupation and pacification. Soldier-settlers and their families moved into fortified villages known as katamas in strategic regions to secure the southern expansion. These armed neftenya settlers and their families were known as the and peasant farmers who were assigned to them the gabbar. The Neftenya were assigned gabbar from the locally conquered population, who effectively worked in serfdom for the conquerors. The majority of the neftenya were Amhara from Shewa. The neftenya-gabbar relationship was a 'feudal-like patron client relationship' between the northern settlers and southern locals. As land was taken, the northern administrators became the owners and possessed the right to dispose of land as they pleased.

While the majority of the Neftenya were Shewan Amhara they were not the only ones that were part of the Neftenya ruling class, which also consisted of others who assimilated into Amhara identity as a class based system in order to enforce ruling power over other Ethiopians, often by extreme cruelty and violence. Amhara sub-groups claim that it only consisted of Amhara people. Since local people, whatever their origins, were also able to assimilate into the Neftenya class, by virtue of marriage, or adopting the religion, language and cultural traits of the Amhara, it also included Tigrayans, Oromos, and Gurages, a majority of which came from the Kingdom of Shewa. Shimelis Abdisa used the Amharic word neftenya ("riflemen" in English) to refer to the ruling class established in the wake of Emperor Menelik II's conquest in southern Ethiopia in the late 19th century. Abdisa's use of the term neftenya prompted backlash given that it is often used to refer to members of Emperor Menelik II's army after the TPLF came to power in 1991, but Abdisa inaccurately identified the term with all populations of Amharas rather than the multi-ethnic aristocratic class of the Ethiopian Empire which the term originally stood for.

As a result of neftenyas settling in the southern regions, other ethnic groups assimilated by into royal court culture by adopting the Amharic language, Orthodox Christianity, and other aristocratic cultural traits found in royal court culture. Both peasant Amhara culture and Ethiopian Empire royal court culture have heavily influenced each other; this Ethiopian royal court culture (that influenced and was influenced by Amhara culture) dominated throughout the eras of military and monarchic rule although Siegfried Pausewang concluded in 2005 that "the term Amhara relates in contemporary Ethiopia to two different and distinct social groups. The ethnic group of the Amhara, mostly a peasant population, is different from a mixed group of urban people coming from different ethnic background, who have adopted Amharic as a common language and identify themselves as Ethiopians". Later on the term started to be applied to Amhara civilians as an ethnic slur, even though the Shewan Neftenya leadership was multi-ethnic in nature and the very existence of a distinct and ethnically conscious Amhara ethnic group in that time period has been contested as an anachronism.

From the 17th to the 19th centuries, Amharas were the dominant politico-military influence on central and southern Ethiopia, and later on conquering portions of north-central Ethiopia (including Gondar, Amhara Region and Raya Azebo, Tigray Region - for a short period of time) during the Imperial period of Tewodros II, Menelik II, and Haile Selassie.

In the 19th Century, the Shewans (included several sub-groups of Shewan Amhara and Shewan Oromo people) held prominent roles in the consolidation of the Ethiopian Empire under the rule of the Kingdom of Shewa as members of Menelik II's Royal Court.

Both the imperial and the Derg government relocated numerous Amharas into southern Ethiopia where they served in government administration, courts, church and even in school, where Oromo texts were eliminated and replaced by Amharic. The Abyssinian elites perceived the Oromo identity and languages as an obstacle to the expansion of Ethiopian national identity. Under the Haile Selassie Regime Oromo was banned from education, and use in administration. In 1967, the regime of Haile Selassie I outlawed the Mecha and Tuluma Self-Help Association and later instigated a wave of mass arrests and killings of its members and leaders. Prominent military officer and leader of the association, Colonel General Tadesse Birru, was also arrested. This reaction by the regime had been caused by the popularity of the organization among the Oromos and its links to the Bale Oromo resistance movement. By 1980, the original 120 members of the Derg had been whittled down to only 38. All members but three were ethnic Amhara and were predominantly from settler colonialist neftenya origins. Many member of the ruling elite were deeply opposed to the idea of loosening control on the rebellious southern regions conquered under Menelik II.

== Establishment of administration ==
In Illubabor in the 19th century, the semi-feudal system of neftenya, balabats, and gebbars was introduced. The Shewan officials and soldiers who settled in Illubabor, known as neftenya, were assigned to a number of peasant households, or gabbars depending on their rank and position. A Dejazmach was granted 1,000 peasant households, a Fitawrari 300, a Kenyazmach 100 to 150; a Shambal 70 to 90; a Mato Alaqa 40 to 60, Hamsalaqa 25 to 35 and an ordinary soldier 5 to 10. Each peasant household had to go to the land owned by the overlord and contribute his labor as a form of tax. The overland provided food and drinks. At the end of the work, each peasant went back to their land or business. Taxes were collected from every married couple. In addition to the tax (gabbar sometimes the local farmers built the fences and homes of the overlord. They had to supply honey, butter, chicken and fattened sheep or goat on holidays. Each household had to produce fifty kilos of grounded cereals to each neftenya every month. Furthermore, the peasants had to transport grain crops to the nearest government granaries. If a gabbar failed to fulfill his duties, he would be summoned to the court. As C.F. Rey had noticed "[...] the judges are the sub governor creatures of course take the side of the plaintiff in nine cases out of ten." The neftenyoch could pass any judgment they wanted, short of capital punishment, which required Emperor Menelik's approval.

The Oromo recount a long history of grievance which casts them as colonial subjects violently displaced from their land and alienated from their culture. Beginning from the late 18th and early 19th centuries, the adjacent Amhara community engaged in constant voracious attacks and raiding expeditions against the surrounding Oromo nation. In 1886, the land, then known as Finfinne, was renamed to Addis Ababa by Menelik II as the capital of Ethiopian Empire. Under the Haile Selassie regime Oromo was banned from education, and use in administration. The Amhara culture dominated throughout the eras of military and monarchic rule. Both the Haile Selassie and the Derg governments relocated numerous Amharas into southern Ethiopia where they served in government administration, courts, church and even in school, where Oromo texts were eliminated and replaced by Amharic. The Abyssinian elites perceived the Oromo identity and languages as hindrances to Ethiopian national identity expansion.

Certain sub-sets of Oromo society were faced with forced assimilation into the dominant political system with their traditional political administrative system being abolished or banned. Certain non-Shewan Oromo had been branded by Naftenyans as outsiders and called the derogatory term "galla", meaning "invader", "outsider", or "enemy."

There has also been criticism of the terminology the OLF uses; since its formation, the OLF has used the terminology "Abyssinian colonialism" to describe the alleged colonization of ethnic Oromos by Amhara (Abyssinians) during the 1880s conquests by Emperor Menelik II. However, both Oromos and Amhara Ethiopians alike have disagreed on such strict use of the word "Abyssinians" as exclusively meaning Amhara Ethiopians, because Oromo conquests since the 1500s have led to northern Oromos being part and parcel of the Abyssinian empires centered in Gondar. One particular example used by Ethiopianist Oromos, like Merera Gudina, against OLF is the historical accounts on Oromo rule of Ethiopia in the 1700s, including the Yejju Oromos "controlling the imperial seat at Gonder for about eighty years." Ethiopianists claim that since Oromos were citizens of Abyssinia for several centuries (both as peasants and in its leadership), Abyssinia itself is made up of its Oromo citizens. Thus northern Oromos were Abyssinians, long before Emperor Menelik was born to lead the alleged "Abyssinian conquest of Oromos." Therefore, since an ethnic group cannot colonize itself, both the incorrect use of the word "Abyssinia" and the claim of "colonization of Oromo" terminology has been disputed by Ethiopianists.

== Ethnic slur ==
Allusion to Amhara, the second most populous ethnic group in Ethiopia, as "neftegna" or "neftenya" (meaning "musketeers") by the government and local officials was described as "inflammatory" by Human Rights Watch in 1995. Officials of the Ethiopian People's Revolutionary Democratic Front, including, those from the ANDM (Amhara National Democratic Movement) used the term "neftenya" (gunslinger), as well as "chauvinist", "oppressor", "Yekedmo sre'at nafaqi" (English: "one who pines for the old order"), in a "derogatory" sense during their period of rule according to Amanuel Tesfaye, and usage in the context of the Hachalu Hundessa riots in 2020 was called "inflammatory" by Terje Skjerdal and Mulatu Alemayehu Moges, as part of their paragraph on hate speech predominating in Ethiopian media at the time. In the context of interethnic conflict, the term is used as a reference toward extreme Amhara nationalists, in which the suppression of the identities, languages, cultures, traditions, histories and religions of the annexed lands and conquered peoples are placed under a One-Nation, One-Language, One-Religion imperial rule based on the Amhara culture, as well as against politicians or portions of the general public regardless of ethnicity perceived as Ethiopian nationalists who support multicultural civic or liberal nationalism in order to move Ethiopian politics and governmental administration away from ethnicity-based identity politics in order to support the individual rights of each person; which politically vocal ethnic federalists and ethnic nationalists who oppose such views claim it to be a ploy towards taking away group rights-based political powers from various ethnic groups.

The imperial flag of Menelik II.

== See also ==
- Ethiopian Empire
