= Lieka =

Former settlement in Ethiopia

Lieka or Liekà was a former settlement in 19th and early 20th century Ethiopia, a major market town in the Oromo region southwest of Shoa. It was located on the Bilo plain, 290 kilometers (180 miles) southwest of Sokota and retained a hereditary Oromo ruler upon its integration into the empire of Menelek II. It has since lost its importance as a regional market to nearby Nekemte.

The village at the former site is now spelled Leka.
