= Bekere Godana =

King of Leqa Neqemte of Oromo realms in Ethiopia in 19th century

Bekere Godana was a king of the Leqa Neqemte one of the realms of the Oromo in the mid-19th century, ruled 1841–1868. He was the first of the kings to establish Nekemte as his capital. His rule ended in 1868 when he was succeeded by his son Moroda Bekere.

Godara established his the state or polity of Leqa Nekemte in 1841, extending his rule of Neqemte over a larger area beyond the borders of the city itself. He came to power as the leader of the Oromo Gadaa system in the city of Neqemte.

== Sources ==
- Philip Brooks. Ethiopia. p. 615
- Ta'a, Tesema. "The Process of Urbanization in Wollega, Western Ethiopia: The Case of Neqemte." Journal of Ethiopian Studies 26, no. 1 (1993): 59–72. Accessed April 28, 2020. www.jstor.org/stable/41966012.
