= Kumsa Moroda =

Ethiopian governor

Kumsa Moroda (Oromo: Kumsaa Morodaa) was the third and last Moti, or ruler, of the Welega kingdom, also known as the Leqa Neqemte state. His father was Moti Moroda Bekere.

Under his rule, Nekemte continued to prosper, despite the reimposition of central authority. The Russian explorer Alexander Bulatovich visited Nekemte on 13 March 1897; in his memoirs, he describes its marketplace as "a very lively place and presents a motley mixture of languages, dress, and peoples", and carefully described the paintings in the town's newly constructed Ethiopian Orthodox church. In 1905, a central government customs office was officially opened in Nekemte.

His cousin was the businessman and historian Blatta Deressa Amante, father of the senior statesman Lij Yilma Deressa.

== See also ==
- List of rulers of Leqa Naqamte
