= Western Galla Confederation =

1930s Oromo separatist movement in Ethiopian Empire

- 1936
- Capital: Gore
- Historical era: Second Italo-Ethiopian War
Preceded by	Succeeded by
Ethiopian Empire	Italian East Africa

The Western Galla Confederation was an Oromo separatist movement in Abyssinia during the Second Italo-Ethiopian War. The movement sought to split off from Abyssinia and become a mandate of the United Kingdom, but gained no international recognition.

Captain Esme Nourse Erskine was the British Consul at Gore from 1928 to 1936. During the Italian invasion 1935-1936, Erskine helped the Western Oromo Confederation chiefs with their application, which he probably drafted, to the League of Nations, in which Oromo chiefs asked “to be placed under a British mandate … until we achieve self government”. He forwarded the applications to the British Foreign Office. The British government declined to forward these applications to the League of Nations.

== Sources ==
- Smidt, Wolbert. "Western Galla Confederation". Encyclopaedia Aethiopica.
- Gebissa, E. (2002). The Italian Invasion, the Ethiopian Empire, and Oromo Nationalism: The Significance of the Western Oromo Confederation of 1936. Northeast African Studies, 9(3), new series, 75-96. Retrieved December 16, 2020, from http://www.jstor.org/stable/41931281
- Zewde, B. (1987). An Overview and Assessment of Gambella Trade (1904-1935). The International Journal of African Historical Studies, 20(1), 75-94. doi:10.2307/219279
