= Welega Province =

Former province in western Ethiopia

Coordinates: 9°N 36°E

Location of Welega within the Ethiopian Empire

Welega (also spelled Wollega; Oromo: Wallaggaa; Amharic: ወለጋ) was a province in western Ethiopia, with its capital city at Nekemte. It was named for the Wollega Oromo, who are the majority of the population within its boundaries.

Welega was bordered on the west by Sudan, on the north by the Abbay River which separated it from Gojjam, on the east by Shewa, on the south-east by Kaffa, and on the south by Illubabor. Welega is known for its fertile highlands producing coffee, maize, wheat and barley. It is also known for its dairy products and is very well known across Ethiopia for best-quality butter, often known as 'Welega kibe'. Welega is also very rich in Gold.

== History ==
The region was governed by Kumsa Moroda in late 19th century. Wollega is a historic province located in western Oromia, Ethiopia, known for its rich cultural heritage, fertile landscapes, and major contributions to the political, educational, and economic life of the country. The region is divided into several administrative zones today, including East Wollega, West Wollega, Kellem Wollega, and Horo Guduru Wollega. Major towns such as Nekemte, Dembi Dollo, Shambu, and Gimbi have historically served as important centres of trade, education, and administration in western Ethiopia.

Geographically, Wollega is characterised by highlands, forests, rivers, and fertile agricultural land. The region is one of Ethiopia’s most productive agricultural areas, producing coffee, maize, sorghum, teff, sesame, and other important crops. Wollega coffee, in particular, is internationally recognised for its quality and distinctive flavour. The area is also rich in natural resources, including gold and forest products, which have contributed to local livelihoods and regional economic importance.

Historically, Wollega has long been recognised as a centre of education, intellectual development, and political consciousness in Oromia and Ethiopia more broadly. The region has produced many highly educated professionals who have played significant roles in the Ethiopian civil service, academia, healthcare, aviation, and public administration. People from Wollega are often associated with strong educational aspirations, leadership capacity, and political awareness. Many prominent Ethiopian doctors, professors, pilots, military leaders, artists, and politicians have roots in the region.

Wollega has also occupied a central place in Oromo political history and mobilisation. The region contributed substantially to the development of modern Oromo nationalism and played an influential role in the formation, leadership, and ideological foundation of the Oromo Liberation Front (OLF). Because of this historical role, Wollega is often regarded by many Oromos as a symbolic centre of Oromo identity, political resistance, and aspirations for freedom, justice, equality, and self-determination.

Culturally, Wollega is known for its strong Oromo traditions, music, oral poetry, and the preservation of the Afaan Oromo language and Gadaa values. Traditional social systems emphasise respect, collective responsibility, reconciliation, and community solidarity. The people of Wollega are widely recognised for their hospitality, generosity, openness, and kindness toward visitors and neighbours alike. These social values remain an important part of Wollega’s identity and continue to shape the reputation of its people throughout Ethiopia and within the Oromo diaspora worldwide.

Following the Italian defeat of the Emperor in 1936, the Mecha Oromo Confederation tried to apply to the League of Nations to break away from Ethiopia and become a British Protectorate. Oromo chiefs asked “to be placed under a British mandate … until we achieve self-government". This was supported by the British Consul at Gore, Captain Esme Nourse Erskine, but the move was rejected by the British Government.

Following the liberation of Ethiopia in 1941, the following provinces were added to Welega to simplify administration: the semi-autonomous areas of Asosa, Beni Shangul, Leqa Naqamte, and Leqa Qellam, and the province of Sibu.

The boundaries of Welega remained unchanged until the adoption of new constitution in 1995, when Welega was divided, with part of its territory becoming the Asosa and Kamashi Zones of the Benishangul-Gumuz Region, and the rest becoming part of the Mirab Welega, Misraq Welega and Illubabor Zones of the Oromia Region.

== See also ==
- History of Ethiopia
