= Gore, Ethiopia =

Town in Oromia Region, Ethiopia

Gore Goree
- Town
- Location within Ethiopia
- Coordinates: 8°9′N 35°31′E
- Country: Ethiopia
- Region: (Oromia Region) Oromia
- Zone: Illubabor
- Elevation: 2,085 m (6,841 ft)

Population (2005)
  - Total: 12,708
- Time zone: UTC+3 (EAT)

Gore (Oromo: Goree) is a town in south-western Ethiopia. Located south of Metu in the Illubabor Zone of the Oromia Region, this town has a latitude and longitude of 8°9′N 35°31′E and an elevation of 2085 meters.

Gore is known for its honey. The map attached to C. W. Gwynn's account of his 1908/09 triangulation survey of southern Ethiopia shows that Gore had a telegraph station. During the 1960s, experimental tea plantations were started around Gore, and a number of them thrived. The Gummaro plantation near Gore, with 800 hectares, is the largest tea plantation in Ethiopia.

The town is served by Gore Airport. Captain Esme Nourse Erskine, the British Consul at Gore (1928–1936), developed the aerodrome and produced “Flying Directions Kurmuk to Gore (1932).

== History ==
Gore was founded in the nineteenth century, growing up around Ras Tessema Nadew's palace. The Russian explorer Alexander Bulatovich stopped here on 21 November 1896, expecting to meet Ras Tessema, who was away campaigning against the Mocha; Ras Tessema had not returned when Bulatovich left on 31 December. With the growing prosperity of the port town of Gambela, and the growth of the Baro River route to Sudan, Gore likewise prospered, holding two market days a week. Richard Pankhurst describes the pre-World War I community as having five foreign trading concerns -- "two Greek, one Syrian, one British and one German"—engaged in the export of coffee, wax, and to a lesser extent animal hides, and the import of cotton cloth, salt, and other manufactured goods. Civet cat oil was also a significant export at the time, Pankhurst noting that Ras Tessema exported 42 kilos in 1910.

On 9 July 1927, the Greek nationals T. Zewos and A. Donalis were awarded a contract to link the town and Gore by road with Gambela, a distance of 180 kilometers. However, the road from Jimma to Gore was not yet built by 1935. A trip to Addis Ababa took 20–22 days for pack mules and 14–15 days for riding mules. The mail transport from Gore to the capital departed every Monday at 17.00 while the government telephone line was used also as telegraph connection.

Esme Nourse Erskine was the British Consul at Gore from 1928 to 1936. Upon his arrival here, “Erskine set about building an impressive residency on a hill overlooking Gore, with outbuildings, barracks, and stables for ten special constables, and a pack of hounds” now a ruin. During the Italian invasion 1935–1936, Erskine helped the Western Galla Confederation with their application to the League of Nations, in which the Galla (Oromo) chiefs asked “to be placed under a British mandate … until we achieve self government”. The British government declined to forward these applications to the League of Nations.

Later Ras Imru Haile Selassie attempted to use Gore as his base to resist the forces of the occupying Italian forces, but hostility from the local Welega Oromo forced him to move from the town late in October, 1936. On 26 November 1936, the Italian 1st Eritrean Brigade occupied the town.

During World War II the British War office sent out Military Mission 107 to Cairo in October 1940 under the command of Lieutenant Colonel Courtney Brocklehurst, with Erskine as political Officer, to raise the Galla (or Oromo) people of the Gore area against the Italians with a promise of liberation from both the Italians and the Amhara. However, the Emperor objected to the Mission as he considered that it might lead to the Galla people breaking away from Ethiopia as had been proposed by the Western Galla Confederation in 1936. The Emperor also distrusted Erskine. The Emperor appealed to Churchill, who instructed that it should not proceed, but should be moved to Kenya to assist with the invasion of Ethiopia from the south and priority was given to Mission 101 (Gideon Force).

After World War II, Gore served as the capital of Illubabor province, until 1978 when Metu became the capital.

== Demographics ==
Based on figures from the Central Statistical Agency in 2005, Gore has an estimated total population of 12,708 of whom 6,125 were males and 6,583 were females. The 1994 census reported this town had a total population of 7,114 of whom 3,322 were males and 3,792 were females. It is the largest settlement in the woreda of Ale.
