= Balabat =

Ethiopian wealthy aristocratic upper class

Balabat (Amharic: ባላባት, romanized: balabat or balebat, lit: 'with father' compare with English Patrician) was a largely traditional Ethiopian social class of wealthy land owners who lived on rent collected from their tenant framers (gebbars). Balabats were below the Mesafint (hereditary nobility "princes") and equal to the Mekwanint (appointed nobility "officers") in the class hierarchy. They were closely related to, commonly married to, and had the same economic base on land as the Mesafints and Mekwanints. Balabats officially ceased to exist when feudalism was abolished in 1975.

== Politics ==
Balabats were a powerful figure in Ethiopian society and, had substantial influence on its politics. They were heavily represented in the imperial parliament that was established in 1931. Emperor Haile Selassie I had reduced their importance to centralize authority around the end of his reign as the last emperor.

== Revolution ==
After the February 1974 popular revolution the Derg overthrew the government of Emperor Haile Selassie. In 1975 the Derg abolished the monarchy and feudalism to establish Ethiopia as a Marxist–Leninist state. This ended the Ethiopian empire and aristocracy.
