= Nekemte =

Town in Oromia Region, Ethiopia

Nekemte Naqamtee
- City
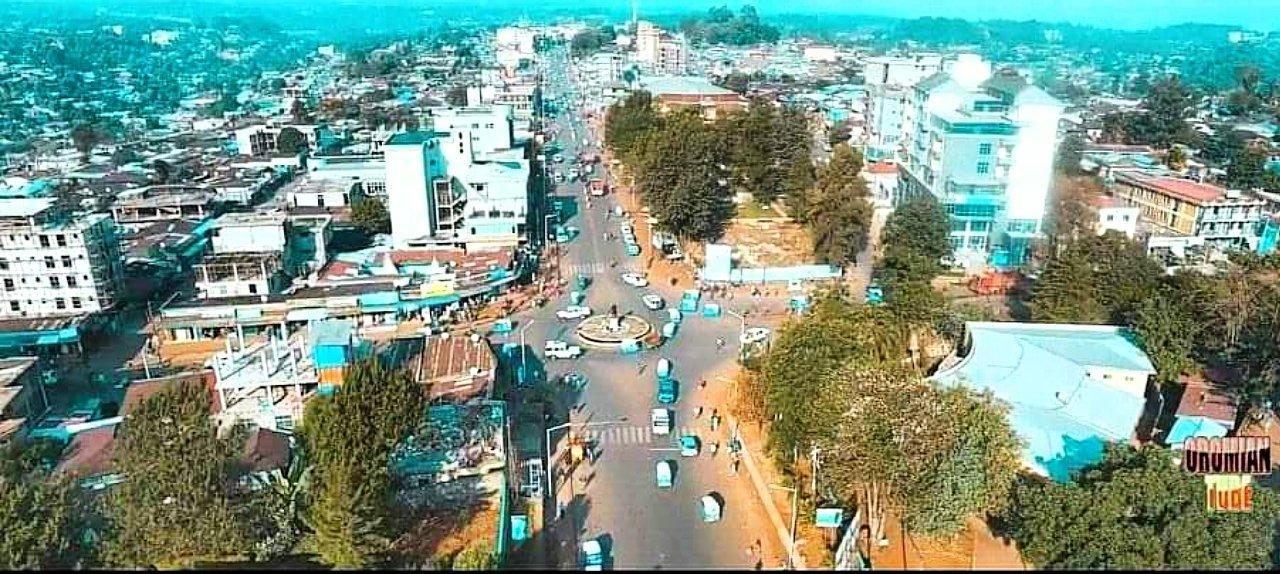
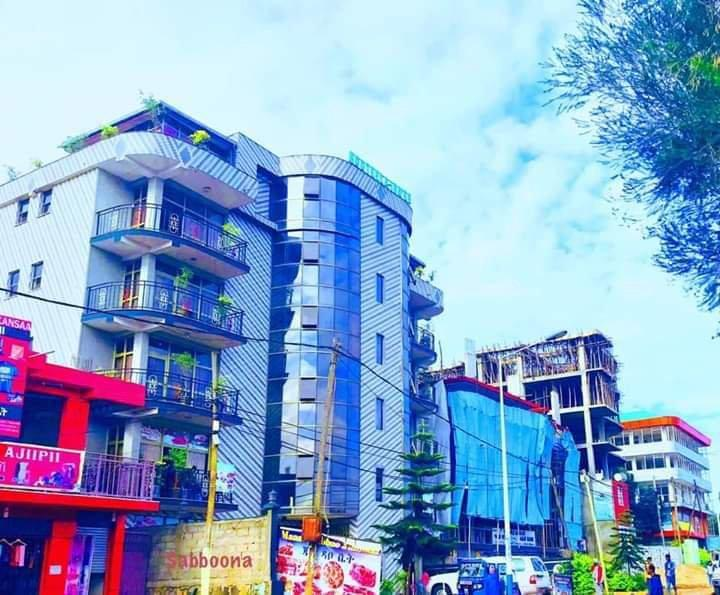
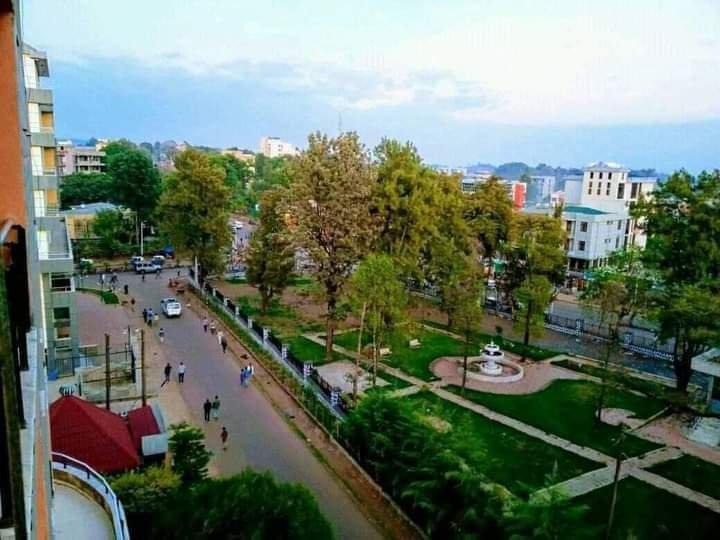

- Location within Ethiopia Nekemte (Africa)
- Coordinates: 9°5′N 36°33′E
- Country: Ethiopia
- Region: Oromia
- Zone: East Welega
- Elevation: 2,088 m (6,850 ft)

Population (2007)
  - Total: 75,219
  - Estimate (2021): 148,613
- Time zone: UTC+3 (EAT)
- Climate: Cwb

Nekemte, also spelled as Neqemte (Oromo: Naqamtee, Amharic: ነቀምት), is a market city and separate woreda in western Ethiopia. Located in the East Welega Zone of the Oromia Region, Nekemte has a latitude and longitude of 9°5′N 36°33′E and an elevation of 2,088 meters.

Nekemte was the capital of the former East Welega, and is home to a museum of Machaa Oromo culture. It is a burial place of Onesimos Nesib, a famous Oromo who translated the Bible to Oromo Language for the first time, in collaboration with Aster Ganno. It is also the seat of an Apostolic Vicariate of the Roman Catholic Church. Nekemte is host to Wollega University. It is served by an airport.

Nekemte is at the center of the road network for south-western Ethiopia. The first major road dates to the early 1930s, with a road that extended from the capital Addis Ababa west through Addis Alem, although the road was passable only by lorries for the 255 kilometers between Addis Alem and Nekemte. Pankhurst later notes in his book that this road had five toll-gates. A road connecting Nekemte to Gimbi, 110 kilometers in length, was part of the first stage of the Third Highway Program in 1963. Postal service for this city has been present as early as 1923. A branch of the Ethiopian Electric Light and Power Authority began providing electricity to the city by 1960. By 1957, phone service extended to the city.

== History ==
Nekemte like most of the towns of the Welega Province grew as a result of the rise of agricultural surplus after the Oromo became permanently settled in the early in the late 16th-century. Its rise was also closely connected with the rise of the Oromo institution of Gadaa, a system where every 8 years leadership in the community was transferred to a new age class of leaders.

Nekemte was formerly overshadowed by nearby Lieka and Bilo, the former regional markets. Nekemte acquired some importance when Bekere Godana in 1841 extended his rule of Nekemte over more area to form a new polity known as Leqa Neqemte and later his son Moroda Bekere made it the capital of Leqa Neqemte in the mid-19th century. Under Mereda's son Kumsa Moroda (Gebregziabher Moroda after converting to Christianity), the city continued in its importance as it submitted to Shewan rule. The Russian explorer Alexander Bulatovich visited Nekemte on 13 March 1897; in his memoirs he describes its marketplace as "a very lively place and presents a motley mixture of languages, dress, and peoples", and carefully described the paintings in the city's newly constructed Ethiopian Orthodox church. In 1905, a central government customs office was officially opened in Nekemte. Construction on a hospital began in 1927, and was completed in 1932 with Swedish funds as well as contributions from Ras Tafari (who later became Emperor Haile Selassie). It formally opened on 16 February 1932, although it had already been in operation for eight months.

By 1935 Nekemte had become the most important town in Welega. There were nearly 70 foreign residents before the Italian occupation, mostly merchants and missionaries. 23 importers-exporters had agencies there, most of whom were Indians, but these also included two Greeks, a Lebanese, and an Armenian. The British explorer Dunlop, who spent four days of the same year in that city, noted that its central location on the main trade route between Addis Ababa and the Anglo-Sudan led to it having "developed enormously during the preceding few years, as the new school, warehouses, stores, and hospital testified".

During the Italian invasion, Nekemte was bombed by the Italians 5 July 1936; this included dropping 19 bombs on the recently constructed school complex of the local Swedish mission. Dejazmach Habte Maryam, governor of Welega, accepted the Italians and received Colonel A. Marone who arrived by air on 14 October and the troops of Colonel Malta who reached the city on 24 October, after having marched by foot and mule for twelve days from Addis Alem, which weakened Ras Imru Haile Selassie's attempts as Prince Regent to establish a center of resistance at Gore. After his successful return to Ethiopia, on 20 May 1941 Emperor Haile Selassie visited Welega where fighting still continued and where Kebede Tesemma was in charge of the Arbegnoch. When he attempted to visit Nekemte, his party came under artillery fire.

A public address system was installed in the central square in Nekemte (and in ten other towns) in 1955, used for receiving transmission from Radio Addis Ababa and re-broadcasting it. In 1957 Haile Sellasie I School was opened, one of nine provincial secondary schools in Ethiopia and outside Eritrea. At that time Nekemte was still the end point of the telephone line westward. The Tafari Makonnen Leprosarium (founded that year) also had a home-school for children of leprous parents.

Head of State Mengistu Haile Mariam visited Nekemte during a formal tour in March–May 1979. In that same year, over 300 Evangelical Christians had been imprisoned for political reasons.

Early in 1991, the Ethiopian Fourth Revolutionary Army had its headquarters at Nekemte. The Ethiopian People's Revolutionary Democratic Front captured Nekemte on 2 April 1991, as part of Operation Freedom and Equality (Duula Bilisummaa fi Walqixxummaa). In response, the Oromo Liberation Front (OLF) said in a broadcast on the Radio Voice of Oromo Liberation (Frankfurt am Main) on 15 April 1991: "The OLF strongly opposes the phrase: liberating Wellega or the Oromo nation. It is false for any alien force to say that it will liberate the Oromo nation."

After the Ethiopian trade mission in the Somaliland city of Hargeisa was hit by a suicide bomb attack, which killed at least four Ethiopian civilian lives on 29 October 2008, three human rights activists working for the Ethiopian Human Rights Council in Nekemte were arrested, but were released by 27 November.

== Climate ==
The city has a mild highland subtropical climate (Köppen: Cwb). With a lower elevation than Addis Ababa, Nekemte has a slightly higher average temperature, differing mainly in the low averages. The average annual temperature is 18.3 °C (high: 24 °C and low: 12.6 °C), although to the north of Equator March is the warmest month and July the coldest month. With more than 2080 mm, it is one of the rainiest places in the country, with most of that rain occurring in the Summer. Nekemte is on an imaginary line where western winds give way to eastern ones. It is one of the seven rainiest cities in the country. From about 2007 to 2017, a nearby meteorological station showed an average annual temperature that, though lower than that from 1990, was still higher than 1970, when rigorous recordkeeping began there, as well as greater precipitation than that seen in the 1980s.

Climate data for Nekemte, elevation 2,080 m (6,820 ft)
Month	Jan	Feb	Mar	Apr	May	Jun	Jul	Aug	Sep	Oct	Nov	Dec	Year
Mean daily maximum °C (°F)	25.7 (78.3)	26.7 (80.1)	27.0 (80.6)	26.7 (80.1)	24.3 (75.7)	21.7 (71.1)	20.7 (69.3)	20.7 (69.3)	21.8 (71.2)	23.2 (73.8)	24.2 (75.6)	24.7 (76.5)	24.0 (75.1)
Daily mean °C (°F)	18.2 (64.8)	18.5 (65.3)	20.0 (68.0)	20.2 (68.4)	18.3 (64.9)	16.6 (61.9)	15.8 (60.4)	15.8 (60.4)	16.5 (61.7)	17.5 (63.5)	17.5 (63.5)	17.7 (63.9)	17.7 (63.9)
Mean daily minimum °C (°F)	11.6 (52.9)	12.3 (54.1)	13.0 (55.4)	13.3 (55.9)	12.8 (55.0)	11.5 (52.7)	11.1 (52.0)	11.0 (51.8)	10.6 (51.1)	11.3 (52.3)	12.0 (53.6)	11.6 (52.9)	11.8 (53.3)
Average precipitation mm (inches)	8 (0.3)	16 (0.6)	60 (2.4)	85 (3.3)	233 (9.2)	380 (15.0)	422 (16.6)	367 (14.4)	294 (11.6)	142 (5.6)	60 (2.4)	22 (0.9)	2,089 (82.3)
Average relative humidity (%)	46	43	52	46	58	75	81	81	71	62	56	50	60
Source: FAO

== Demographics ==
The 2007 national census reported a total population for this woreda of 75,219, of whom 38,385 were men and 36,834 were women. A plurality of its inhabitants were Protestant, with 48.49% of the population reporting they observed this belief, while 39.33% of the population said they observed Ethiopian Orthodox Christianity, and 10.88% were Muslim.

The 1994 census reported this city had a total population of 47,258 of whom 22,844 were males and 24,414 were females. Nekemte is the largest city in Guto Wayu woreda.

== Sports ==
Association football is the main sport in Nekemte. The Welega Stadium, which has a capacity of 50,000, is the largest sports venue by capacity in Nekemte. It opened in 2019 and the stadium is also mainly used for football, and also for athletics.

== See also ==
- List of cities and towns in Ethiopia

== Sources ==
- Pankhurst, Richard (1968). Economic history of Ethiopia, 1800-1935. OCLC 586053361.
