= Merab (given name) =

Merab (Georgian: მერაბ) is a Georgian masculine given name, and may refer to:

- Merab Dvalishvili (born 1991), Georgian UFC fighter
- Merab Kostava (1939–1989), Georgian dissident, musician and poet
- Merab Kvirikashvili (born 1983), Georgian rugby union footballer
- Merab Mamardashvili (1930–1990), Georgian philosopher
- Merab Ninidze (born 1965), Georgian actor

== See also ==
- Paul Merab (1876–1930), a Georgian physician, pharmacist and researcher of Ethiopia
- Merav
