= Pietro Antonelli =

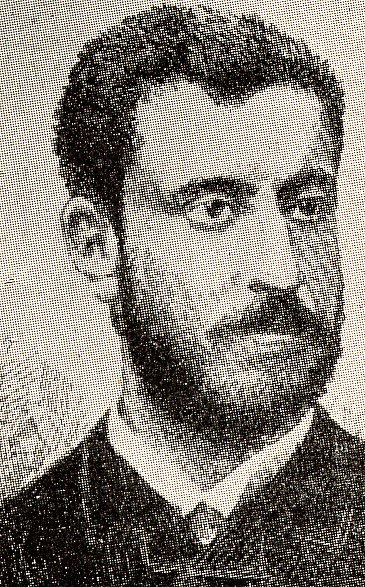

Deputy of the Kingdom of Italy
- In office Legislatures D, XVI, XVII, XVIII
- In office 10 June 1886 – 8 May 1895
- Legislature XVIII: General Budget Committee (27-11-1892-1-12-1892)
- Parliamentary group: Right
- Constituency: Roma I

Undersecretary for Foreign Affairs
- In office 15 December 1893 – 14 June 1894
- Monarch: Umberto I
- Prime Minister: Francesco Crispi

Undersecretary for Foreign Affairs
- In office 14 June 1894 – 20 June 1894
- Prime Minister: Francesco Crispi
- Website: Official page

Pietro Antonelli (Rome, 29 April 1853 – 11 January 1901) was an Italian diplomat, explorer and politician.

== Biography ==
Son of Count Luigi and Camilla Folchi, grandson of Giacomo, cardinal and secretary of state to Pius IX, he was Italian ambassador to Ethiopia at the court of Menelik II of Ethiopia.

Adventurous and enthusiastic, he left Italy at the age of 26, becoming a leading figure in the generation of Italian explorers of the late 19th century in the Horn of Africa. Among these were Orazio Antinori (whom he succeeded as ambassador), Vittorio Bottego, Romolo Gessi, Carlo Piaggia, and Giuseppe Sapeto. The intentions and missions of these explorers were mostly colonial in nature. From 1879 to 1881, he explored the territories, engaging in scientific collections.

A supporter of African expansion plans, he supported armed assistance to Menelik, backing his ambitions for independence from Emperor John IV, with the aim of bringing the sovereign closer to Italy and allowing the latter to exercise a pre-eminent role in Ethiopia and in the territory of Eastern Africa. The plan, however, was based on the false perception that Menelik had genuine trust in Italy, ignoring the sovereign's difficult character and interests, and failing to appreciate how much the plan conflicted with Abyssinian history and tradition. This policy initially manifested itself in a contract signed in March 1881 with Menelik for the purchase of rifles in Italy and the opening of a trade route outside the control of other powers. This was followed first by a convention that provided freedom of movement for Italians and their goods, which were also exempt from duties, and then by a ten-year treaty of friendship and trade between Italy and Shewa (which subsequently remained effectively ineffective). Relations became complicated when Menelik, fearing that Negus John would view his ties with Italy with suspicion, maintained an interlocutory attitude, avoiding excessive compromise. The situation was further aggravated by the Italian occupation of Massawa, a grave offense in the eyes of the emperor.

With the advent of Francesco Crispi, Antonelli's plan for expansion in Africa entered the government's agenda, and the count became the representative of the new Foreign Minister. In the context of the Italo-Abyssinian conflict, Antonelli understood the importance of Menelik's role and therefore sought his benevolent neutrality, if not an alliance against the common enemy. In exchange for the shipment of weapons, Menelik pledged absolute neutrality, but the sovereign's request to keep the agreements secret aroused skepticism among the Italians.

After the death of the Negus and Menelik's accession to the throne as King of Kings of Ethiopia, Antonelli was the architect of the diplomatic incident that arose over the Treaty of Wuchale of May 2, 1889. Article 17 of the Treaty differed in the Italian and Amharic versions (consente in the Italian version; può in the Amharic version). This gave Italy the pretext to claim the protectorate over Abyssinia, which led to one of the worst defeats of the young Kingdom of Italy.

A follower of Francesco Crispi, he was elected deputy of the Kingdom of Italy in the XVI, XVII, and XVIII Legislatures and undersecretary of the Ministry of Foreign Affairs from December 15 1893 to June 20 1894, attempting but failing to restart the interrupted negotiations with Menelik.

On November 24 1894 he was appointed minister plenipotentiary in Buenos Aires; almost exactly three years later (November 21 1897) he was transferred to Rio de Janeiro where he contracted yellow fever, from which he failed to recover: he died while attempting, aboard a steamship, to return to Italy.

== See also ==
- Ministry of Foreign Affairs (Italy)

== Bibliography ==
- Carlo Zaghi (1961). "ANTONELLI, Pietro – Enciclopedia – Treccani". Dizionario Biografico degli Italiani (in Italian). Vol. 3: Ammirato–Arcoleo. Rome: Institute of the Italian Encyclopaedia. OCLC 883370.
