= Garmame =

Ethiopian military commander (c. 1808–1900)

Garmame (Note: Garmame in various sources also spelled as Germame, Garmame Walda Hawaryat and Germame Welde Hawaryat) (b. ca. 1808/09/10 - 22 March 1900) (Note: Bairu Tafla in a 1969 article gave a different date of birth; 1810 and death; 1889. However these dates don't correspond with other sources, or events during the 1888-1892 Ethiopian Famine, which Garmame said to have been notable. Encyclopedia Aethiopica put the date of his birth on circa 1810 and the date of death on year 1899. Dictionary of African Biography put the birth date on circa 1808/1809 and is more specific on the date of death 22 March 1900) and Horse name: Abba Mala was an influential 19th century Ethiopian military commander, provincial governor and royal counsellor serving under Negus Sahle Selassie, Haile Melekot and Emperor Menelik II. He held the title of Dejazmach. Garmame is remembered for his leading role in rescuing Menelik II and other notables from captivity in July 1865, and restoring the Shewan heir back to the throne. In May 1877 he prevented a coup concocted by Bafena, and solidified the position of his Negus. After retirement from military activities, Garmame governed large tracts of fertile land south of Ankober, and is also remembered for his role in providing relief to the people during the disastrous 1890's famine'.

== Ancestry ==
Garmame was born in Tegulet

Sources are contradictory about the identity of his parents. One version by a Catholic missionary; Guglielmo Massaia, said that Garmame was a natural son of King Sahle Selassie of Shewa. According to this version, Garmame would have been the first son of Sahle Selassie, and not Haile Melekot (presumably his much younger half brother).

A second version by Garmame's chronicler; Qenazmach Hayle, said Garmame was the illegitimate son of Wossen Seged, making him a younger brother of Sahle Selassie. Garmame was born during Wossen Seged's reign.

A third version is that he was the son of Walda Hawaryat (Note: Also spelled Welde Hawaryat), and Betesanabatan of Tegulet. Walda Hawaryat descended from the Shewan nobility and his genealogy claimed to trace back to the Solomonic Emperor Eskender. Whatever version is the correct one, Garmame was very closely associated with the Shewan ruling family since at least the 1840s.

== Life ==
=== Galla rebellion 1847 ===
Garmame's first (military) role of significance occurred in the aftermath of King Sahle Selassie's death. He is said to have been in service of Haile Melekot when King Sahle Selassie was still alive. On the death of the latter, the Oromos of Shewa rose in open revolt. He advised the new king, Haile Melekot, not to lead the military expedition himself, and took the task upon him to put down the rebellion. Garmame skillfully divided the Oromo chiefs, and days later led a victorious military campaign as far as Nazret. Thus, Garmame along with the two princes Darge Sahle Selassie and Sayfu Sahle Selassie played a major role in stabilizing Haile Melekot's new administration.

=== Governor of Awash Valley ===
Since his military feat, until his death (except for the period Tewodros II conquered Shewa between 1855-1865), Garmame governed the region of the Awash Valley, from his seat at Debre Gojo, southwest of Ankober and Tegulet.

=== Escape from Magdala 1865 ===
Garmame was instrumental in the escape of Shewan royal family, most notably Menelik II, and other notable political prisoners of Tewodros II. Garmame managed to feign loyalty to Tewodros and even been given the hand of Qataro Merso, (Note: Qataro Merso was the daughter of Merso Haile Maryam, member of the Semien ruling family. Her uncle's were Betul Haile Maryam, father of Empress Taytu Betul, and Wube Haile Maryam one of the most prominent warlords of 19th century Ethiopia. Garmame was forced to marry by the order of Emperor Tewodros II, thus he didn't trust her, and suspected that she was a spy of the Emperor.) whom he suspected was a spy for Tewodros. Garmame was the intermediary between secret correspondence between Menelik II and his loyal followers back in Shewa. To avoid any leaks of secrets, Garmame pretended to be ill, and moved his bed from house to house to one or other of his loyal friends at Tewodros II's camp. Oblivious, his wife Qataro sent all the people her husband told her who were knowledgeable of medicine to him, when in reality they were Garmame's secret agents.

In July 1865, crafty Garmame threw a feast and invited his friends, and the guards of the fortress gate to eat and drink at his house. He acted in the manner of a most generous host and saw to it that everyone, including his wife, had an abundance of liquor. After midnight, when everyone was intoxicated and asleep, Garmame led Menelik II and twenty other Shewans through the unguarded gates, and escaped the fortress. By dawn, the fugitives, on horses purchased in advance by Garmame's agents, had reached Werqitu's camp in Wollo some kilometers to the south. After replenishing their strength, they left for Shewa on the third day.

=== Coup aborted ===
In 1877 before leaving Shewa for a military campaign in Gojjam, Menelik had entrusted the administration of Shewa to Azzaj Wolda Tsadeq and Dejazmach Garmame. Bafena inspired rebellion through Haile Mikael Sahle Selassie took them by surprise, and the aged noble took control of Ankober on May 2, 1877, proclaiming himself as the Negus of Shewa. Two days later, Garmame supported by Afe Negus Madhane restored order by defeating Haile Mikael's forces in battle. Haile Mikael was wounded, captured and imprisoned at Ankober.

On 15 May however, the sly Bafena convinced Menelik to make her regent in his absence, and came into possession of his royal seal that authorized her above Garmame and Wolda Tsadeq, and took control of the strategic fortress of Tamo, and plotted her next coup attempt.

=== Role in the 1888-1892 Great Famine ===
Unlike many of his peers, Garmame preferred landed property and the cultivation and storage of grain to anything else. During the great famine of 1888-1892, he was the only notable governor who could supplement the depleted granaries of the imperial palace.

=== Death ===
He died of illness and was buried at the Lalibala church cemetery of Qacama around 1899 or 1900.

== Genealogy from Tegulet ==
Emperor Eskender r. 1478-1494
Woyzero Marta	Aläm-Säggäd
Gǎbră-Şeyon	Wālāttā-Sara
