= Bafena =

Consort of Menelik II

Bafena Wolde Mikael or better known as just Bafena (Note: In various sources spelled as Bafena, Bafana, or Baffana) (1834-1887) was the second wife of Menelik II then the King of Shewa (m. 1865-1883). She was described as ‘‘attractive, vivacious and ambitious’’ and is remembered for her failed conspiracy against her husband, in an attempted coup plot in 1877.

== Biography ==
=== Ancestry and rise ===
Of humble origins, Bafena came from Marra Biete and was of Amhara lineage. Her father's name was Wolde Mikael. Risen in society, temporarily, to being the wife of meridazmach Aboye, (chosen viceroy of Shewa by emperor Tewodros II). She was subsequently married to Afa Negus Madhane (Note: Also spelled in various sources as Bedane), and to two or three other men before becoming Menelik's consort.

=== Consort's ambitions ===
Bafena became Menilek’s wife by customary law, despite being considerably older than Menelik, the Negus has been entranced with her shortly after his return to Ankober from captivity under Tewodros II in 1865. Capuchin missionary Guglielmo Massaia, a foreign advisor with good standing at his majesty's court, viewed her as ‘‘sly, immoral, and a troublemaker’’ despite her attempts to win him over with generous gifts. Bafena wanted Massaia to convince Menelik to take the rite of communion (church marriage, which forbids divorce). Massaia knew that Menelik's union with her was ‘‘irregular’’ and that the Negus was under pressure to leave Bafena for a younger woman that could birth him sons.

Bafena was a beautiful and appealing woman, shrewdly astute and full of ambitions. The French trader Pierre Arnoux brought her foreign goods such as perfumes, fabric, stockings and a mirror wrote that she was ‘‘a beauty, and a woman of remarkable good sense.’’ Her sons from previous marriages were given titles and positions and became court favourites. Manalebish, one of her daughters, was married to Dejazmatch Mekuria, grandson of King Sahle Sellasie, the commander of the riflemen (or Turk Basha). (Note: Turk Basha is not a name. It's a position (the commander of the riflemen) in Menelik's army.) Another daughter was promised to another grandson of King Sahle Sellasie, Meshasha Sayfu, (Note: Mashasha Sayfu was the son of Sayfu Sahle Selassie, full brother of Haile Melekot, thus making Mashasha first cousin of Menelik II) the heir apparent to the Shewan crown. Bafena, however, wanted the throne for one of her sons, and believed her bond with Menelik to be so strong that he could be persuaded eventually to adopt one as his heir.

=== Consort's schemes ===
Determined to remove Mashasha from the competition, Bafena orchestrated the severing of good relations between the two cousins. She made accusations of insults against Mashasha towards her, but to no effect. She then abruptly wedded her daughter (that was initially promised to Mashasha) to another lord. Disturbed by Menelik's inaction, the young lord left Menelik's court, only to see his lands forfeited in favour of Bafena.

In 1876 Mashasha, resentful of the injustice done to him, asked his uncle Darge Sahle Selassie to intervene on his behalf. Bafena was forced to restore the territories to Mashasha after a council of arbitration (many of whom disliked Bafena) decided in Mashasha's favour. Enraged, Bafena managed to convince Menelik that his cousin was a potential traitor, and on 14 December 1876 he was imprisoned at Gontcho under the authority of the Muslim governor of Argobba. Menelik lost considerable support through this arbitrary action, at a time when he needed all the strength he could muster, and his acquiescence to Bafena's demands only hardened her determination to see one of her sons on the throne.

Greedy for power, she plotted with Emperor Yohannes IV against her husband Menelik II. Bafena and her followers upheld a particular religious dogma about Christ’s conception. (Note: There were two main sects in the Ethiopian Orthodoxy during this time. Bafena and her followers subscibed to the doctrine of the twin birth of Christ, (the Qarra Haymanot). Its adherents refused to separate the divine and humane nature in Christ. They held to the Two Births in Christ (one from the Father (God), one from the Blessed Virgin i.e Mary). The opposing idea of Christ conception was from Debre Libanos, those who upheld the docterine of the triple birth (Sost Ledest). They believed that Christ 'was born of the Father (God); in the womb of the Blessed Virgin Mary, through the Holy Spirit at the moment of the incarnation; and, after nine months, Jesus was born from the Virgin Mary'. In this creed sharp differiatitions were established between the roles of the persons of the Holy Trinity.) Emperor Yohannes IV, who held this belief, aimed at imposing religious unity upon Christian Ethiopia. He also wanted to rule Shewa, but was unable to do so because it was controlled by Menilek II, who since 1872 had been the only important political figure in northern and central Ethiopia to refuse to recognize him as emperor. Instead, Menilek had called himself Negusa Nagast (“King of Kings”), and was actively attempting to depose Yohannes. Yohannes therefore agreed to support Bafena in a coup whose object was to make her the regent for her son.

=== Conspiracy ===
In 1877, whilst Menelik II was on a military campaign against Tekle Haymanot in Gojjam, Bafena fostered the royal ambitions of Haile Mikael Sahle Selassie (Note: Haile Mikael Sahle Selassie was a son of Negus Sahle Selassie, brother to Haile Melekot, Menelik's father. Thus he was an uncle of Menelik II. Following Emperor Tewodros II conquest of Shewa, Haile Mikael was installed as governor of Shewa in 1855, before being replaced with Meridazmach Aboye in 1858.) who rose in rebellion against his cousin according to Bafena's scheme. On May 4, 1877, after initial success, Haile Mikael's attempted coup failed with his defeat at the hands of Dejazmach Garmame.

Menelik II did not believe Bafena's complicity in the rebellion. in fact, at her suggestion, Menelik authorized her to straighten out affairs in Shewa and provided a written edict naming her regent until his return. Garmame and Wolde Tsadeq refused at first to recognize her authority, but were later reassured by Menelik's seal and gave over to her their command of Shewa's strongholds. Bafena's first act was to free Mashasha Sayfu, whom she intended to use in place of Haile Mikael; to lull him into a false sense of security, she gave him the daughter she had originally promised to him. She then diverted to Tamo (the most secure fortress in Shewa) all valuables, weapons, and munitions in storage at Ankober, Liche, and Feqra Gemb, together with large supplies of provisions, against the possibility of a long siege. But immediately Mashasha was free, he travelled to Tamo, and the viceroy's troops and many others shifted allegiance to him instead of Bafena, and took command of the strategic fortress. Meanwhile the Wollo governor Mikael declared (Note: Mikael of Wollo was at this point the husband of Manalebish, a daughter of Bafena. His action was thus presumed to be related to the conspiracy.) that he would no longer serve Menelik II.

On 25 May 1877 Menelik was on his way back to Shewa from Gojjam. Even after his arrival the king refused to recognize Bafena's betrayal, since outward appearances suggested Mashasha as the prime culprit. The Shewan royal troops were not eager to attack the popular Mashesha and their own comrades, and their morale, already low, dropped sharply. After a week's siege of Tamo. Menelik had to lift the blockade and return to Liche, where he turned to mediation and asked Father Massaia, one of Mashasha's teachers, to use his good relations to bring about an equitable settlement. Aware of his disadvantaged position, Mashasha immediately agreed to seek a negotiated solution. He disavowed intentions of treachery; he desired peace, but needed guarantees for himself and his troops. Bafena's influence over Menelik seemed undiminished.

The request was discussed at a general council of the realm, it's recommendations (which included Bafena to be exiled) were initially rejected by Menelik II. However, after a victory against the Wollo leader Mikael of Wollo and a set back for Emperor Yohannes IV, Menelik agreed to reconciliation with his cousin Mashasha, and the conditions set forth by the council. Bafena was exiled to a remote village, though Menelik still refused to believe that she was a rebel and a traitor.

=== Death ===
On easter Sunday, 29 April 1883, Menelik II and Taytu Betul's marriage was consecrated by Abuna Mathewos. A popular saying at the time of this marriage can be rendered as follows;

‘‘The sun has dissipated the fog.’’ The ‘‘sun’’ being the literal meaning of Taytu, and the ‘‘fog’’ alluding to the word ‘‘dafana’’, hence a play on Bafena's name.

Menelik still cared for the well being of his ex-consort, and even instructed one of his officers, who once had been intimate with her, to marry her. The officer said;

‘‘How dare i touch a woman who once belonged to my king. Menelik shouted You hypocrite! When you stole her from me you liked her, and now that i order you to marry her you don't want her’’.

Bafena died a few years later, in 1887, and was buried at Debre Libanos.

== Descendants ==
Bafena had eight sons and daughters from earlier marriages. A few of them are mentioned by name, Amen Shoa (son), Gizao (son) and Manalebish (daughter).

- Dejazmach Amen Shoa (Note: Amen Shoa is spelled in various sources as Ammana Sawa) (died 1887), was held in high regard by his stepfather Emperor Menellik II.
- Fit'awrari Gizao (died c. 21 June 1882).
- Woyzero Manalebish was the wife, first of dejazmach Mekuria (Note: Also spelled in various sources as Makuriya. He was the Turk Basha (or commander of the riflemen) in Menelik's army.). Her second husband was Ras Mikael of Wollo.
- Unnamed daughter was promised to Mashasha Sayfu, Menelik's cousin.
