= Orazio Antinori =

Italian explorer and zoologist (1811–1882)

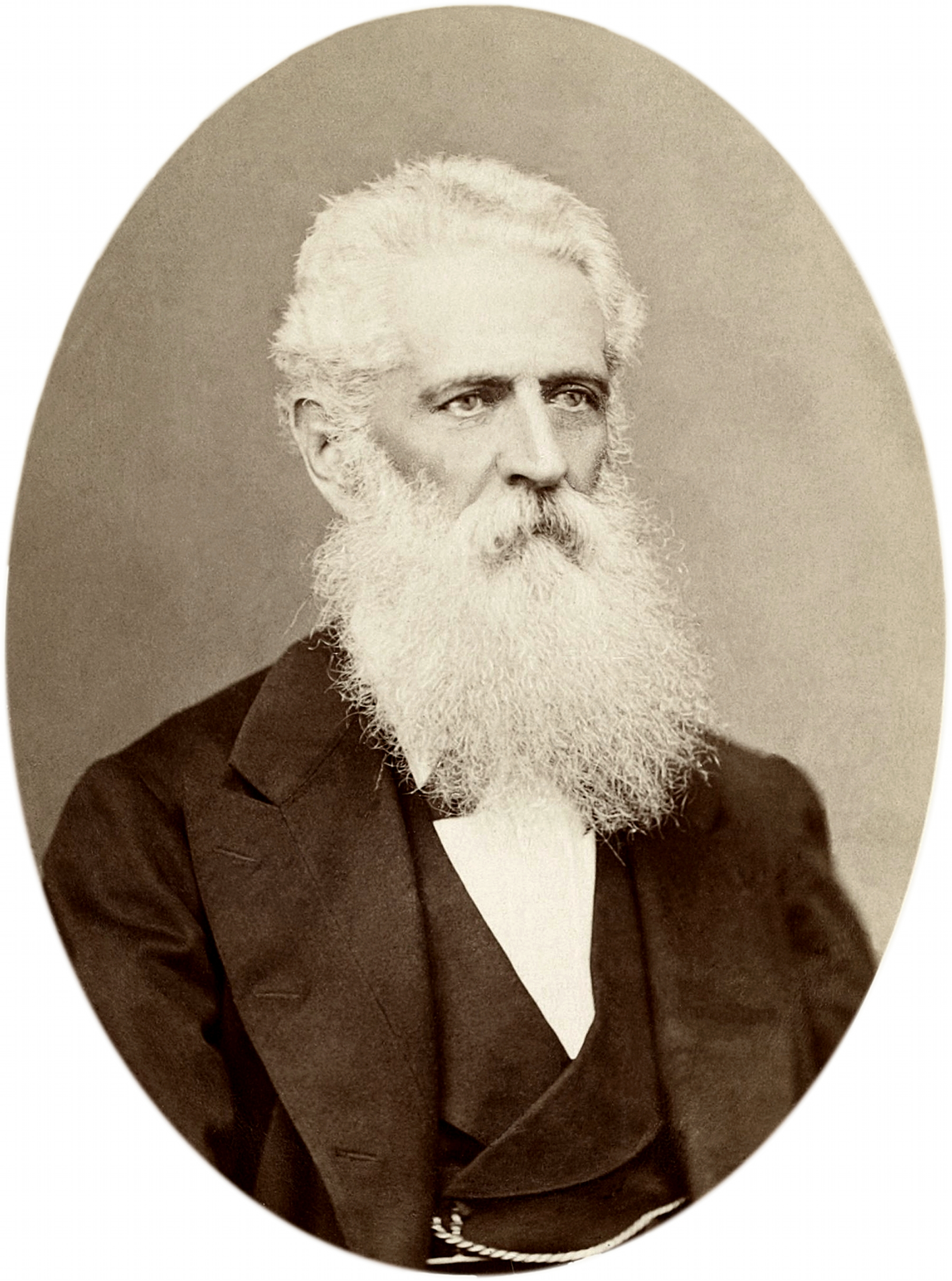
Orazio Antinori

Orazio Antinori (28 October 1811 – 26 August 1882) was an Italian explorer and zoologist.

Antinori was born in Perugia (then in the Papal States) and studied natural history in Perugia and Rome. Afterwards, he collaborated with Charles Lucien Bonaparte and illustrated Iconografia della Fauna Italica. From the middle of the 1840s, he became interested in politics and worked as a journalist. In 1848, he fought against the Neapolitans with the rank of captain, and was later forced into exile. He lived in Athens and Smyrna, becoming interested in the avifauna of the area.

In 1854, he accompanied Cristina Trivulzio Belgiojoso to Syria, afterwards visiting Asia Minor. In 1859, he left for Egypt and travelled up the Nile, in 1860–1861, with Carlo Piaggia (1830-1882). He sold his ornithological collection to the Natural History Museum of Turin. After a long stay in Tunisia, he represented Italy at the inauguration of the Suez Canal.

Antinori took part in the expedition of Odoardo Beccari to Ethiopia and made important collections of natural history specimens. On his return to Italy he became the secretary of the Italian Geographical Society. In 1874, Antinori studied Chott near Tunis. In 1876 he took part in an expedition with Gustavo Chiarini and Antonio Cecchi to the province of Shewa in Ethiopia where they met with Negus Menelik at Liche, and obtained his permission to found a geographical station at Lēt Marefīya. Antinori died in Shewa.
