= Katama =

Ethiopian military encampment

Katama (Amharic: ከተማ kätäma) is the word for a fortified Ethiopian military encampment, that was typically situated on top of an amba. These royal military camps served as the capital of the empire and was an important element of the political and social organization of the Ethiopian state until the 17th century. Later the term was used in the 19th and 20th centuries as any kind of dense urban settlement that functioned as a center of an administrative unit.

== Description ==
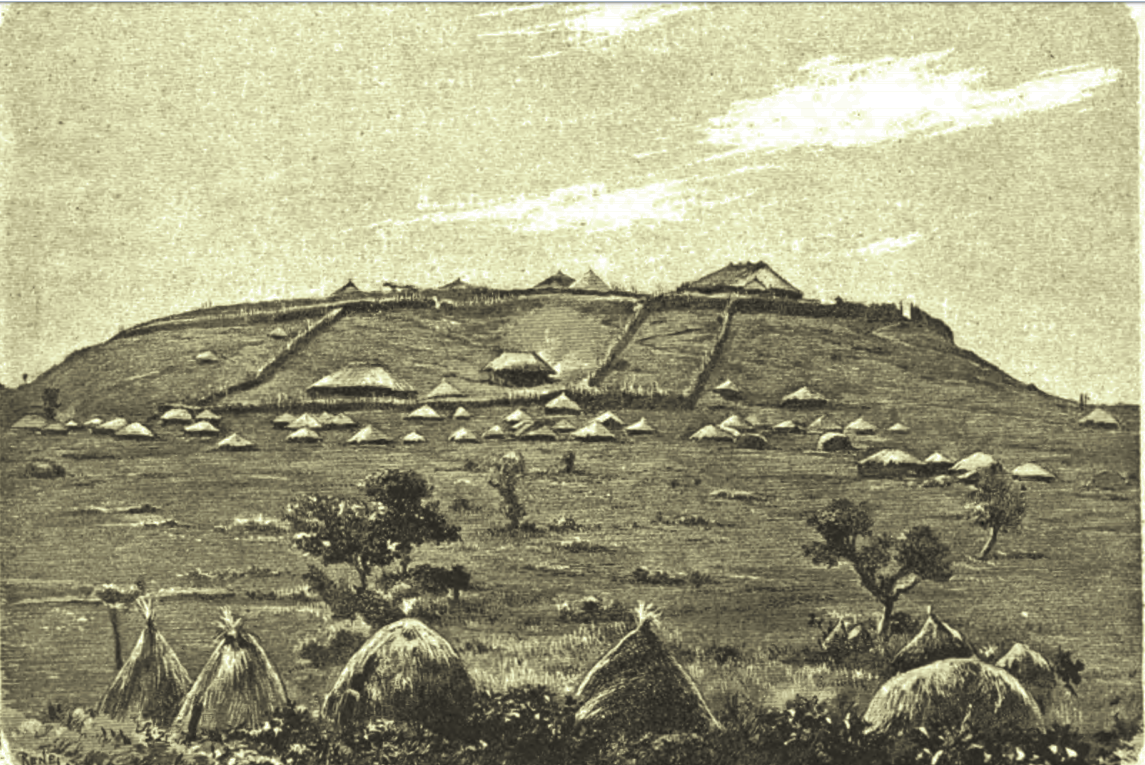
A Katama built by Darge Sahle Selassie in the Chercher province c.1880s

The katama's basic structure was described in the 14th century Ethiopian text Ser'ata Mangest, which describe the ritual proceedings for the assembling and dismantling of a katama camp. According to this text, the camp's construction began with the planting of the royal standard, marking the center of the Emperor's compound, usually on the highest summit. Then surveyors determined the sites of the structures around it. The layout of the katama followed a characteristic pattern, it was circular and concentric around two perpendicular axes. In the center was the Emperor's quarters, which also housed the royal chapels, a clergy and the royal kitchen. The inner center was surrounded by a palisade and only a very limited number of dignitaries were allowed in. In the second circle around that accommodated the compounds of the royal spouses, the court and the rest of the state dignitaries. This too was surrounded by a palisade and strictly guarded. And outside of that was occupied by the houses of vassals, their retainers and their families. There were also other institutions such as prisons, marketplaces and churches. During the medieval era the population of a katama was vast, with Francisco Álvares estimating Lebna Dengel's katama to number over 40,000 people.

After the establishment of Gondar, the culture of establishing military encampments did not disappear, but instead was imitated by smaller courts of regional governors. This would play an important role in Menelik II's conquest of the south and the consolidation of imperial rule. The katama was mostly established on hilltops, sometimes near already existing villages or markets. These katamas were established to house Menelik II's soldiers (neftenya) and their families, but they also served as an outpost for Christian Amhara culture, which acted as a kind of cultural bridgehead towards the surrounding countryside. Many of these katamas evolved into permanent settlements, among those were Irgalem, Jijiga, Galamso, Goba, Dembidolo, Ginir and Negele Borana.
