= Carlo Piaggia =

Italian explorer

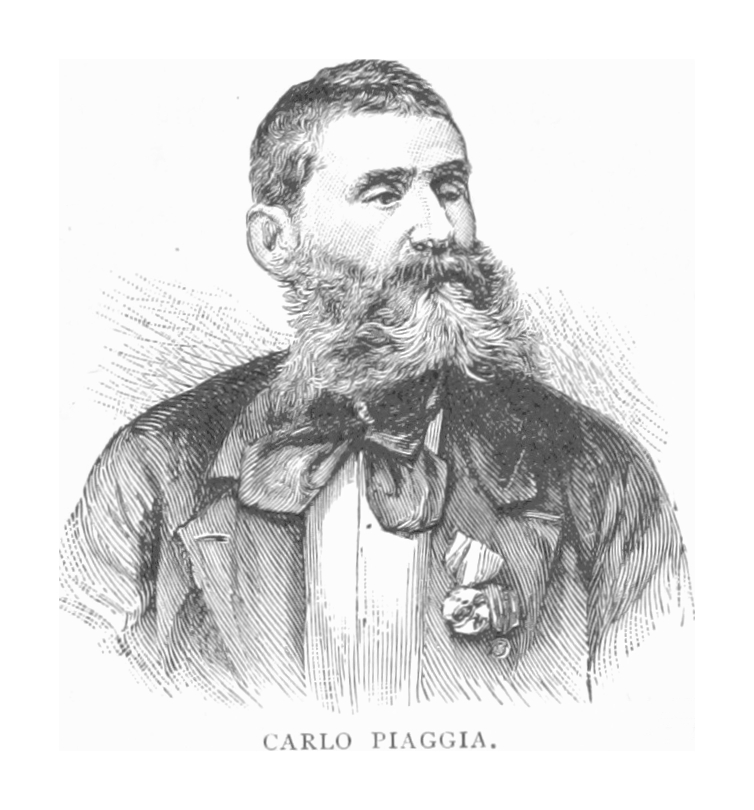

Carlo Piaggia (January 4, 1827 – January 17, 1882) was an Italian explorer of the region of Uganda and the Southern Nile River.

== Biography ==
Carlo Piaggia was born in Badia Cantignano, a frazione of Capannori, in the province of Lucca, Italy. He was born to a poor family and only acquired an elementary formal education. In 1849, his mother, two of his four sisters, and three of his seven brothers died of cholera; this is cited as one of the factors that motivated him to leave Lucca via Livorno.

Piaggia first arrived to Tunis, where he was nearly murdered by locals. He then left to Alexandria to find work. By 1856, he had become an explorer in the Southern Sudan, traveling as far as Gondokor. In 1860, in a trip funded by the Italian Geographical Society, he accompanied Orazio Antinori to the Sudan, along the Bahr el Ghazal river, and traveling among the Zande people during 1863-1865. Paola Ivanov wrote that Piagga "[stood] out in his time for his unprejudiced attitude toward Africans".

In 1871, Piaggia worked with Antinori exploring Eritrea in the region of the Anseba River. In 1873, he travelled all over Etiopia with the French consul De Sarzach and the French explorer Raffray. In 1874, he also traveled around Lake Tana. Traveling up the Nile, he tried to find connections between the Nile and the lakes of East Africa.

In the following years, going up the White Nile with Romolo Gessi, Piaggia explored the Lake Albert and discovered the Lake Kyoga, that he called Lake Capechi. He was one of the first Europeans to document Lake Kyoga in 1876.

Piaggia returned to Italy in 1877 for the last time, but returned to Ethiopia and then to Khartoum. In 1880, discovering that two explorers of the Italian Geographic Society have been imprisoned in the area of Cialla, in Gera, he went up the Nile but the rescue expedition was a failure: local authorities imprisoned him as well. Once freed, in 1881, he had to go back to Khartoum.

Piaggia died in Karkawj (Carcoggi) in the Sudan, while exploring to Southern tributaries of the Nile, and trying to arrange an expedition to ransom the Dutch explorer Shuver.

An Istituto Superiore d'Istruzione 'Carlo Piaggia' was founded in 1931 at Viareggio, in the province of Lucca.
