= Menelik II =

Emperor of Ethiopia from 1889 to 1913

Menelik II ዳግማዊ ምኒልክ
- Negus
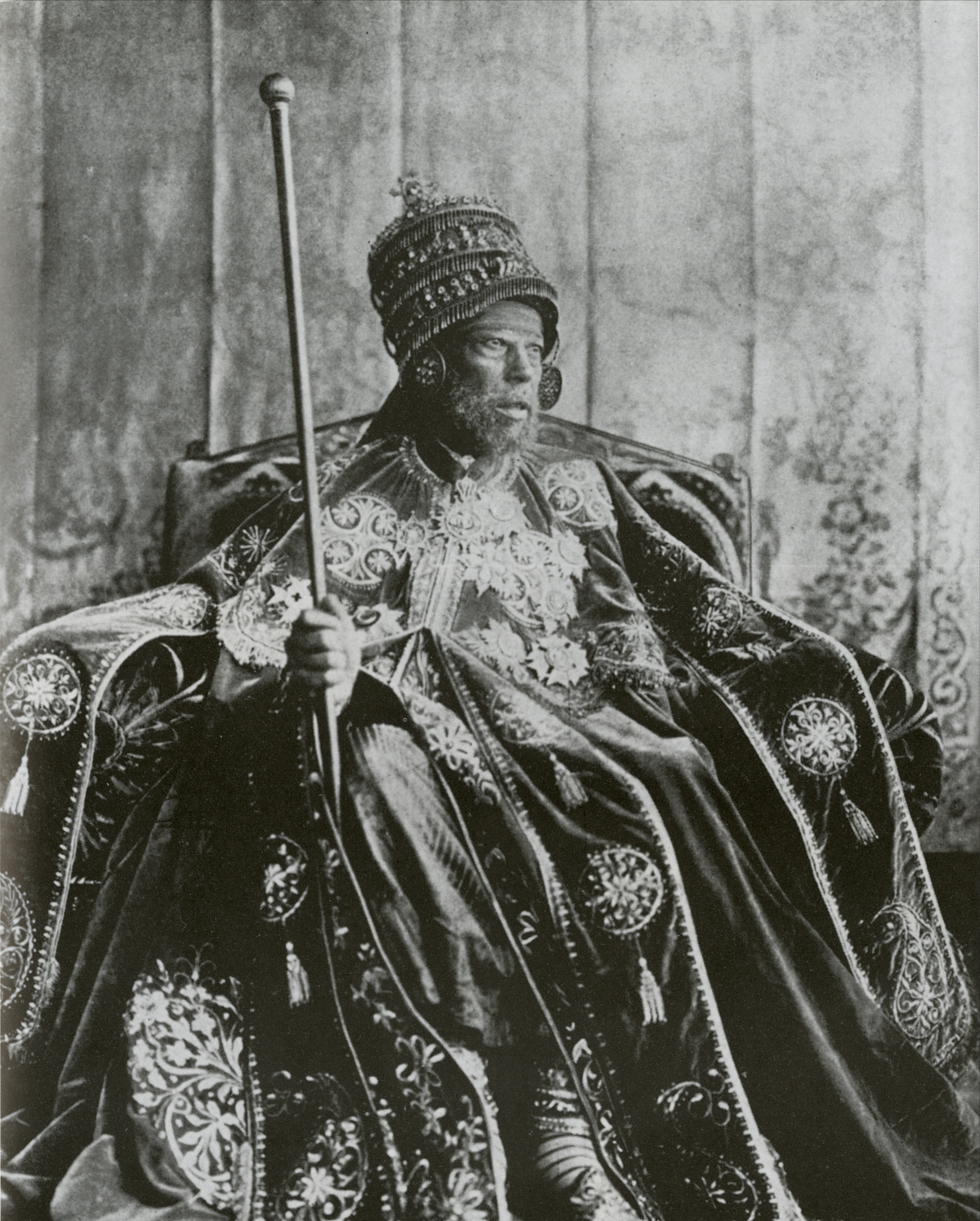
- Photograph of Emperor Menelik II on the throne in coronation garb

Emperor of Ethiopia
- Reign: 11 March 1889 – 12 December 1913
- Coronation: 3 November 1889
- Predecessor: Yohannes IV
- Successor: Lij Iyasu (designated but uncrowned Emperor of Ethiopia)

Negus of Shewa
- Reign: August 1866 - 11 March 1889
- Predecessor: Haile Melekot
- Born: 17 August 1844; Ankober, Shewa, Ethiopian Empire
- Died: 12 December 1913 (aged 69); Addis Ababa, Ethiopian Empire
- Burial: Ba'eta Le Mariam Monastery (now Se'el Bet Kidane Meheret Church); Addis Ababa, Ethiopia
- Spouse: Altash Tewodros (1855–1865); Bafena Wolde Mikael (1865–1882); Taytu Betul (1882–1913)
- Issue: Zewditu I Shoa Ragad; Wossen Seged
Names
- Sahle Maryam (baptismal name); Abba Dagnew (horse name)
- House: Shewa
- Dynasty: Solomonic dynasty
- Father: Haile Melekot
- Mother: Woizero Ejigayehu Hailu
- Religion: Ethiopian Orthodox Tewahedo
- Military career
- Conflicts: Agar Maqnat; Battle of Embabo; Battle of Dodota; Battle of Chelenqo; First Italo-Ethiopian War; Siege of Mekelle; Battle of Adwa

Styles of Menelik II of Ethiopia
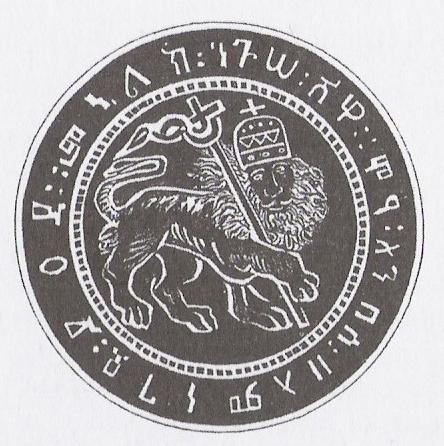
- Reference style: His Imperial Majesty; Amharic: ግርማዊ; girmāwī
- Spoken style: Your Imperial Majesty; Amharic: ጃንሆይ; djānhoi; lit. "O [esteemed] royal"
- Alternative style: Our Lord (familiar); Amharic: ጌቶቹ; getochu; lit. "Our master" (pl.)

Menelik II (Ge'ez: ዳግማዊ ምኒልክ dagmawi mənilək (Note: Dagmawi means "the second".); horse name Aba Dagnew (Amharic: አባ ዳኘው abba daññäw); 17 August 1844 – 12 December 1913), baptised as Sahle Maryam (ሣህለ ማርያም sahlä maryam), was king of Shewa from 1866 to 1889 and Emperor of Ethiopia (Note: Nəgusä Nägäst.) from 1889 to his death in 1913. A member of the Solomonic dynasty, Menelik expanded the Ethiopian Empire to its greatest historical extent and defeated Italian colonial forces at the Battle of Adwa in 1896.

A member of the Shewan branch of the Solomonic dynasty, Menelik was born in Ankober, Shewa, as Sahle Maryam, the son of Haile Melekot (Negus of Shewa). Named "Menelik" by his grandfather King Sahle Selassie after the legendary Menelik I (son of Solomon and the Queen of Sheba), he was imprisoned at age 11 by Emperor Tewodros II at the fortress of Magdala following his father's death in 1855. He escaped in 1865 amid Tewodros's declining power, returned to Shewa, and was acclaimed as its rightful king. Though harboring imperial ambitions, he avoided challenging northern rivals during the British Expedition to Abyssinia in 1868 and submitted to Emperor Yohannes IV in 1878 after failed collaboration with the Egyptians during their invasion (1875–1876).

As quasi-independent ruler of Shewa from 1878 to 1889, Menelik built his power base through direct European diplomacy, securing modern weapons and expertise from advisors such as the Swiss engineer Alfred Ilg. He conquered southern territories inhabited by Oromo, Wolayta and Gurage peoples, exploiting ivory, coffee, gold, and slave trade revenues to fund arms, while establishing fortified katama settlements and the neftenya land system. The strategic conquest of Harar in 1887 turned it into principal trade hub under Ras Makonnen. Following the death of Yohannes at the Battle of Metemma in 1889, Menelik was crowned emperor at Mount Entoto on 3 November 1889.

Menelik signed the Treaty of Wuchale with Italy in 1889; the Italian version implied a protectorate, while the Amharic allowed optional use of Italian diplomatic assistance. Recognizing this deception, Menelik formally rejected the treaty in 1891 leading to an Italian invasion in 1895. Mobilising a unified army of over 100,000, he crushed Italian forces at the Battle of Adwa on 1 March 1896, securing Ethiopia's independence and full European recognition. He defined borders through treaties with Britain, France, and Italy, initiated the Addis Ababa–Djibouti Railway, and centralized governance with ministries, schools, and a state bank. After strokes from 1906 left him incapacitated by 1909, Empress Taytu Betul and later Ras Tessema Nadew served as regents. He died in 1913 and was succeeded by grandson Lij Iyasu (later deposed), followed by his daughter Zewditu and Ras Tafari Makonnen (the future Haile Selassie).

Menelik was a controversial figure for much of his reign. Although he was praised internationally as a symbol of African resistance to colonialism and credited with being the architect of modern Ethiopia, critics among incorporated ethnic groups accused him of forced assimilation, land expropriation, and cultural suppression that contributed to later ethnic tensions. He remains one of the most influential figures in Ethiopian history and is widely regarded as the founder of modern Ethiopia.

== Early life ==
Prince Sahle Maryam was born on 19 August 1844 in Ankober, in the Kingdom of Shewa. Designated heir to the Shewan branch of the Solomonic dynasty, he was the son of Haile Melekot, Negus of Shewa, and Ejigayehu, who was said to have been a young woman working for Bezabish, the sovereign’s mother. Bezabish, noticing that the palace employee was pregnant, questioned Haile Melekot, who acknowledged his relationship with Ijigayehu, thus giving her hope that her son might produce an heir.

At the birth of Sahle Maryam, a civil marriage ceremony was held, and Sahle Selassie (1795–1847), delighted by the news, decided to name his grandson Menelik, prophesying a glorious reign during which the Ethiopian Empire would be reconstituted. Initially, Haile Melekot refused to acknowledge Menelik, but Bezabish intervened, having him legitimized by a council of relatives who concluded that the resemblance between father and son was evident. Another version states that, at Menelik’s birth, Haile Melekot temporarily married the young woman in order to legitimize the child. The boy received the same education as his father; his tutor was Ato Nadew, who remained very close to Menelik throughout his life.

In October 1855, fighting broke out between the forces of Emperor Tewodros II and those of Haile Melekot. The latter was in Debre Berhan, which he ordered evacuated and burned. To protect his son, he instructed a group of loyal Shewan chiefs, including Darge Sahle Selassie (1830–1900), to flee with Menelik to the Minjar plateau, located between the Awash and Kesem rivers. Tewodros II’s troops pressured the Shewan position and obtained Darge’s submission in February 1856. The Emperor then annexed Shewa to the Ethiopian Empire. Menelik, then aged 12, along with Nadaw, Darge, and other chiefs, was captured and taken to the palace of Tewodros at Maqdala.

=== Captivity at the Magdala Fortress ===
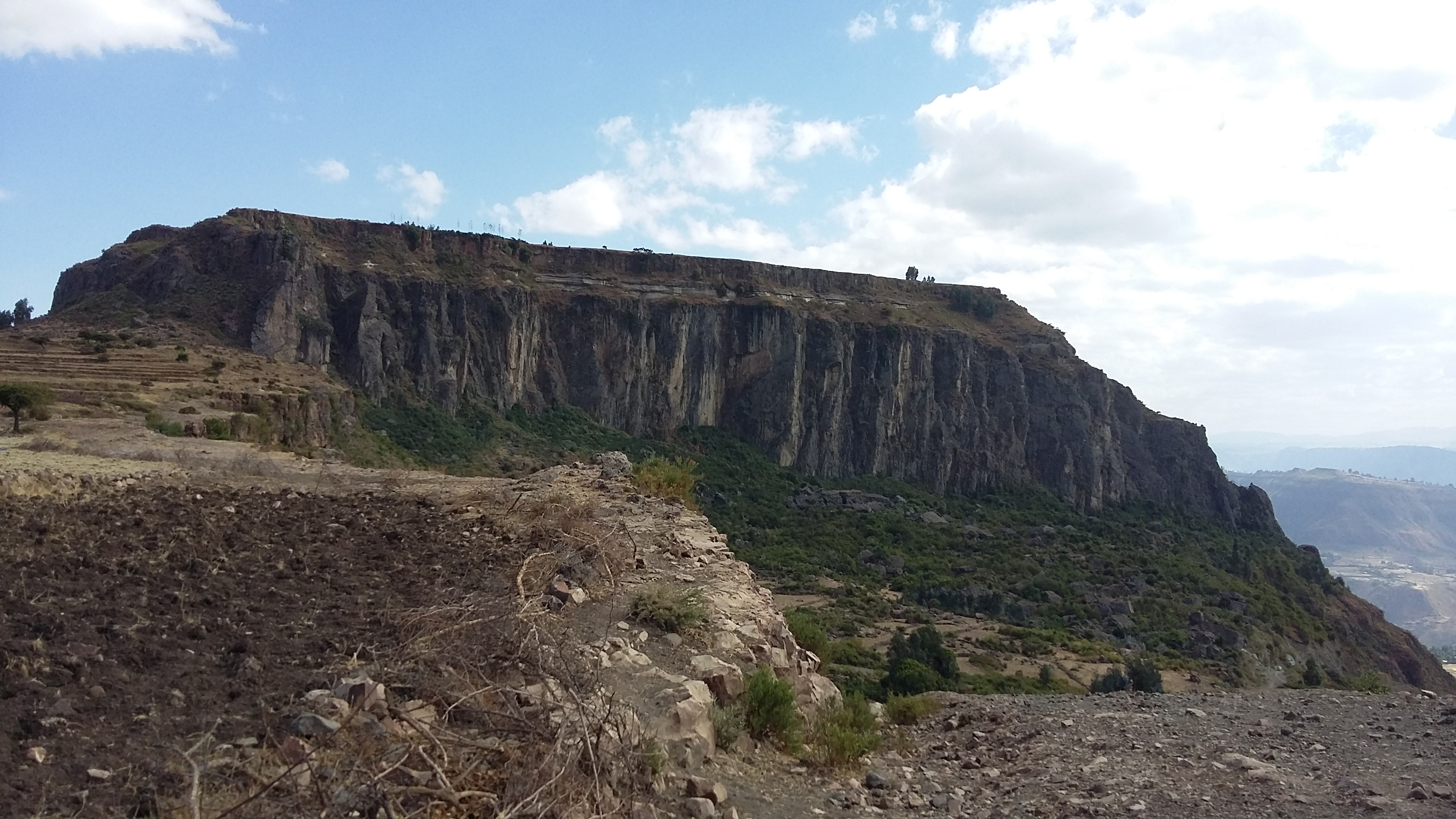
The fortress of Magdala

Upon his arrival at court, Menelik was received with all the honors due to a prince; Tewodros II treated him "like a son," and the officers were respectful and showed a certain admiration. Later, when he spoke of his captivity, he declared: "Although he killed my father and brought me to his court, he always loved me like a son; he educated me with the greatest care and showed me almost more affection than his own son." According to Menelik, Tewodros II told him "more than once … that he would reign after him." At court, Menelik met several figures with whom he maintained a long friendship, in particular Ledj Wale, a member of the Yejju family and brother of Taytu Betul.

Menelik’s education was provided by the Ethiopian Orthodox Church. Alongside this, he studied military strategy and horsemanship. His close ties to the upper levels of administration and power allowed him to gain political experience from a young age. He likely observed some of Tewodros II’s mistakes during this period, particularly his strained relations with Muslims, which caused instability in the Wollo region and made it difficult to govern. He was also influenced by Tewodros II’s policies of unification and centralization; later, he launched a series of campaigns aimed at building a vast empire. Despite his disagreements with the conduct of affairs, Menelik proved useful to the Emperor, who elevated him to the rank of Dejazmach and to whom he offered the hand of Princess Alitash.

=== Menelik's escape and return to Shoa ===
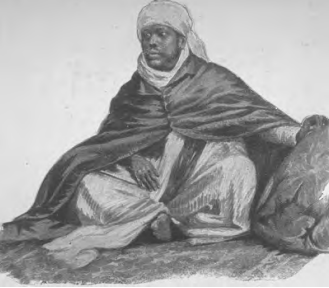
Illustration of a young Menelik, 1870

During his time at court, Menelik maintained his desire to return to Shewa, although he did not intend to do so as long as Tewodros II controlled the entire empire. In 1864, the Emperor’s influence began to decline; his punitive expedition against Ato Bezabeh, who had proclaimed himself Negus of Shewa, failed. A return to his kingdom at a time when Bezabeh was firmly established in power could create tensions; moreover, supporters of his father, Haile Melekot, were urging him to return as soon as possible. The only solution seemed to be escape from the fortress of Magdala; however, some members of the court suspected this plan and informed Tewodros II. He took no specific action due to his trust in Menelik.

On 1 July 1865, in the middle of the night, Menelik, then 21 years old, and a few followers escaped from the fortress through the wide ravine between Amba Magdala and Wollo. As they left, Menelik instructed someone to deliver the following message to Queen Worqitu of Wello, an enemy of Tewodros II: "I have arrived. Send me men to receive me." At dawn, he arrived in Wello, where Worqitu likely planned to capture him in exchange for her son, an imam imprisoned at Magdala. The Queen of Wello sent a messenger to Tewodros II to present the offer, but the Emperor learned of the escape and declared: "The Queen has found a free son; she can do without the one who is chained." He then ordered her son’s execution.

From 1865 onward, a series of events further destabilized Tewodros II’s authority, for which he himself was partly responsible. A famine struck the Tigray and Begemder regions; in early 1866 he launched a punitive expedition whose victims were mainly civilians; in November 1866 he ordered the sacking of Gondar in response to a rebellion; and around mid-1867, fearing desertion among his troops, he ordered the massacre of 800 soldiers. These actions led many soldiers to join Menelik’s forces. Following the execution of Worqitu's son, the army concluded that Menelik's presence in the province was unnecessary, but that if he became ruler of Shewa, he could serve as an important ally. It therefore ordered its soldiers to escort Menelik back to his homeland.

== King of Shewa ==
=== The early phase of his reign ===
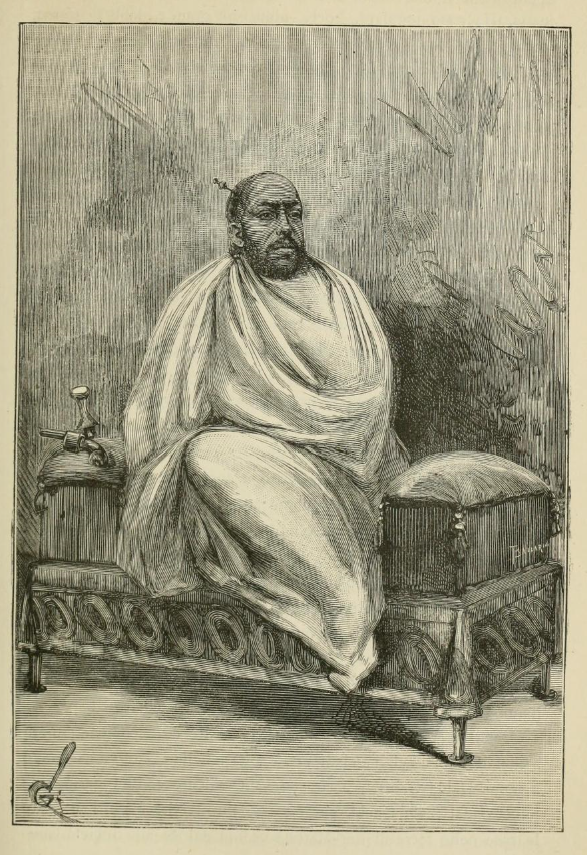
Engraving showing Menelik as king of Shewa, 1877

In August 1866, Menelik arrived in eastern Shewa with the core of his new army and proclaimed himself Negus. Ato Bezabeh, then ruler of the province, attempted to form an alliance with Worqitu, the queen of Wello, telling her that once in power Menelik would have them captured and handed over to Tewodros II. A confrontation took place between Menelik and Bezabeh at the Battle of Qewet. Most of the soldiers chose to join Menelik’s side, while Bezabeh fled to Amba Afqara. This victory earned Menelik 1,000 muskets, in addition to 1,000 firearms and 3 cannons found at Kebrat Amba. When he arrived in Ankober, he was greeted by a jubilant population and a clergy pleased to see him return. Bezabeh decided to ask for forgiveness; his request, supported by priests and influential political figures, was accepted by Menelik, who granted him the fief of Abba Motti in exchange for his submission.

From the beginning of his reign, Menelik sought to be conciliatory and magnanimous toward his enemies; he worked peacefully with the existing Shewan administration. Later, even after ascending to the imperial throne, he continued to prioritize dialogue in order to avoid war and bloodshed. His priority was to consolidate his authority in the face of external threats, particularly increasing Oromo offensives. In power, he abolished various reforms of Tewodros II, and his conciliatory attitude was reflected in his religious tolerance toward Muslims and animists. To ensure this tolerance, the following edict was promulgated:

All religious debate is forbidden in Shewa where all religions are free; any Ethiopian priest found guilty of provoking religious controversy will be punished by death.

This text also aimed to end disputes between religious figures who supported the theory of Christ’s two births and those who supported the theory of his three births. Once his authority was firmly established, Menelik sought to eliminate Bezabeh, who continued to disturb the kingdom while still claiming to be Negus; moreover, it was learned that he was conspiring with the Oromo. Menelik brought the matter before a tribunal, believing the evidence of treason to be sufficient, and despite his refusal to evacuate Amba Afqara, Bezabeh appeared before the court. Subsequently, Bezabeh was condemned to death and executed by gunfire; his soldiers joined the army of the negus. In 1866, Menelik controlled the entire kingdom, at the very moment when Tewodros II was plundering Gondar and his reign was nearing its end.

Upon his accession to the throne of Shewa, Menelik clearly asserted his imperial ambitions. Thus, around September/October 1867, in a letter to Father Guglielmo Massaia, an Italian Catholic missionary in Aden, he presented himself as the “King of Kings.” In two other letters previously sent to Queen Victoria, he referred to himself, according to the British interpretation, as “Sultan Negus,” an incorrect rendering of the title “King of Kings.” In both letters, he announced his succession to his father’s throne; in the one addressed to Queen Victoria, he requested the reopening of relations between Great Britain and Shewa in order to be recognized by London before taking any action against Tewodros II. Menelik intended to free the Europeans imprisoned at Magdala by Tewodros II in order to obtain material support, including modern weapons, from France and Great Britain.

In cooperation with Queen Worqitu, who sought to control Wello, Menelik launched an expedition and arrived on 30 November 1867, with 30,000 soldiers near Magdala. Under the pretext of troop exhaustion, he withdrew on December 2 without engaging in battle; in reality, he had learned of the arrival of Tewodros II and of the maneuvers of another claimant to the throne, Wagshum Gobaze, stationed with his troops about 50 km from Magdala. Gobaze left the region after learning of Menelik’s departure; both men feared the army of Tewodros II, despite its recent weakening.

During Napier’s expedition, the British commander sent a letter to Menelik explaining the British presence: “We have not come to conquer Ethiopia, nor to subject it to our rule, but solely to liberate our brothers unjustly held captive by Tewodros.” Robert Napier warned the Negus of Shewa that if Tewodros II took refuge in his territory or received any assistance from him, British troops would enter his lands. Menelik decided to receive the missionary Massaia to seek his advice, and Massaia confirmed that the British would prevail, even if all of Ethiopia united in support of Tewodros II. Menelik replied that most Ethiopians no longer supported the Emperor, although foreign intervention could rally many local lords to his cause; moreover, as an Ethiopian prince, he was obliged to defend against any violation of imperial borders.

The following week, Menelik and his troops left Were Ilu (Warra Hailu) for Wello and joined Queen Worqitu’s forces, preparing to march toward Magdala. Having assured the British of Shewa’s support, Menelik ultimately returned to Wello, ostensibly to celebrate Easter, without providing assistance to Great Britain. Beyond his reluctance to risk an alliance with the British, Menelik also felt unable to destroy the man who had treated him like a son. Ultimately, during the expedition, Tewodros II, refusing the prospect of being taken prisoner by the British, took his own life.

Menelik later confessed to Massaia that he had been deeply saddened by this event. The missionary, astonished, questioned him about the celebrations that followed the emperor’s death. Menelik replied that he had wished to “satisfy the passions of the people,” adding that he had not taken part in the festivities and had instead gone into a forest to mourn the premature death of the man who had educated him and toward whom he had always felt filial affection; the idea of betraying Tewodros had genuinely repelled him. His only concern had been the defense of Shewa’s interests; however, when he learned that Dejazmach Kassa, later Yohannes IV, had provided essential assistance to the British, Menelik barely concealed his anger at seeing the imperial throne slipping further away from him.

=== The confrontation with Yohannes ===
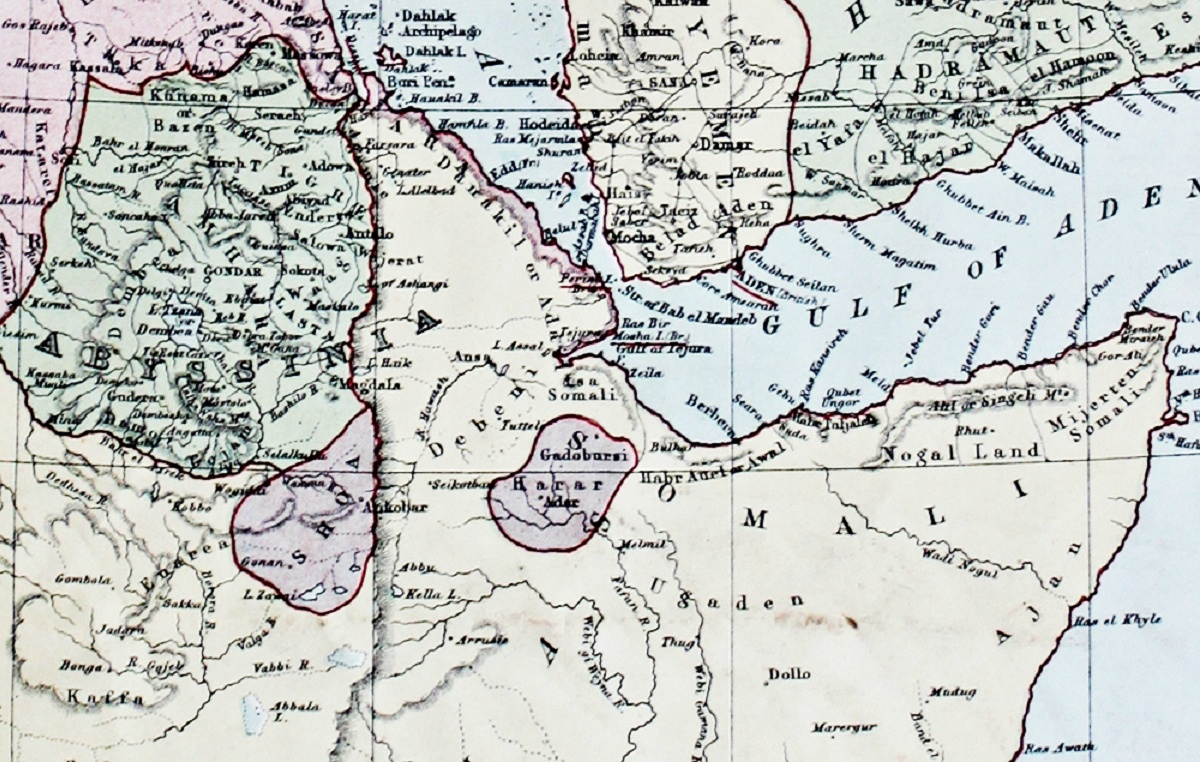
1873 map of the Kingdom of Shewa by John Bartholomew

Driven by their imperial ambitions, Menelik indirectly came into conflict with Kassa Mercha, the future Emperor Yohannes IV; the latter had benefited from Napier’s expedition, gaining a considerable military advantage thanks to the weapons provided by the British in exchange for his assistance. Following the illegal coronation of Wagshum Gobaze in mid-August 1868 under the name of Tekle Giyorgis II, Menelik in turn claimed the title of Emperor; a purely symbolic gesture allowing him to express aspirations rather than to affirm a real situation.

The real struggle was then between Kassa and Tekle Giyorgis II, who was seeking the support of the Negus of Shewa and his large, well-equipped army. Menelik understood that a conflict between the two main contenders could weaken them or even lead to their annihilation and chose not to provide any support to the Emperor. Kassa marched with his troops toward Shewa, without any intention of attacking. He camped in Wello and received letters and gifts from Menelik. Although not satisfied with these gestures, Tekle Giyorgis II left the province after learning that Kassa was marching north, intending to confront the threat he posed. After two battles, on 21 June 1871 and 11 July 1871, Tekle Giyorgis was captured and imprisoned; Kassa emerged greatly strengthened in men and arms and, on 21 January 1872, he was crowned Emperor at Aksum under the name of Yohannes IV.

While the two contenders clashed, Menelik did not remain idle; at the end of 1868, after Worqitu’s death, he began the pacification of Wollo, the buffer province between Shewa and Tigray. He founded the strategic ketemas (garrison towns) of Were Ilu and Enawari, which served as bases for offensives in areas still under the control of the new queen Mestewat, considered unreliable, and her son Abba Wato. For the governorship of Wello, Menelik supported a relative of Mestewat and Worqitu: Muhammad Ali, later Ras Mikael; the Negus of Shewa also secured the support of the dejazmach Wale, whom he appointed governor of Yejju. Menelik’s political influence was approaching Tigray in the north. In mid-November 1871, while Kassa and Tekle Giyorgis were fighting, Menelik was on the border of Begemder at the head of an army composed of Shoan and Wello soldiers; he had moved there to “take advantage of any opportunity.” However, his plans failed due to a rebellion by Queen Mestewat; her son, a commander in Menelik’s army, deserted with his men and marched toward Magdala. Weakened by this withdrawal, Menelik returned to Shewa, subsequently devastated Wello but failed to dislodge Abba Wato from Magdala.

Following these interventions, Menelik could not afford to confront Yohannes IV. The latter had greatly benefited from his victory over Tekle Giyorgis: he had new weapons, and captured soldiers were integrated into his army. The priority for the new Emperor was the stabilization of Begemder and Gojjam; Shewa was not, for the moment, a crucial element for Yohannes IV. Menelik had a strong army, whose cavalry was its strength. Nevertheless, the coronation of Yohannes IV marked a clear failure of Menelik’s policies and diplomacy: he received no military aid from the British, the confrontation between Yohannes IV and Tekle Giyorgis brought him nothing, and he had witnessed the rise of a new ruler. Although forced to face a legitimate Emperor, Menelik’s imperial ambitions were not affected. He received Ras Wolde Maryam, formerly a supporter of Yohannes IV, and sent him to Begemder to raise a rebellion. He also organized large feasts attended by nobles, military leaders, and clergy from the city of Liche; leaders even came from Gojjam, Gondar and Tigray. One large feast cost, according to an official, more than 15,000 thalers. Menelik confided: "Kassa defeated Tekle Giyorgis with cannons; I fought him with thalers, tej and brindo [raw meat], and I am certain of defeating him."

However, he knew that dinners and receptions alone would not suffice and wished to acquire weapons at least as effective as those of Yohannes IV; to do so, he had to increase his financial resources. The Negus of Shewa was rich in livestock and land, but annually the million thalers available were used for the running of the administration and the army. Difficult access to the sea prevented him from selling the riches of the Southwest (including musk and ivory). The development of trade was largely hampered by the archaic laws and customs of the Kingdom; it was difficult for European merchants to do business with a conservative population and clergy. Under these conditions, an increase in trade revenue was not considered a sufficient resource to modernize his army.

=== Alliance with Egypt ===
With the arrival of Egypt in the Horn of Africa, an opportunity arose to get rid of Yohannes IV; the first contacts were established by alaqa Birru, a dissident who had fled the provinces controlled by the Emperor and who suggested to Menelik that he cooperate with the Egyptians then established on the shores of the Red Sea. Menelik approached the sons of Abu Parka Pasha, whom he sent to Cairo to negotiate an alliance with Khedive Ismail Pasha; however, Egyptian records make no mention of this agreement. Some sources claim that alaqa Birru acted as an intermediary between Menelik and Werner Munzinger.

A plan for the military encirclement of Yohannes IV was then allegedly devised; he, if forced to surrender, would then have been compelled to relinquish the imperial throne to Menelik, while the Egyptians would have taken possession of part of Tigray in exchange. The existence of such arrangements seems to be confirmed by the attitude of Khedive Ismail Pasha, since in the early 1870s he still did not recognize Yohannes IV as Emperor; a defeat of the latter by the Egyptians would have constituted a unique opportunity for the Negus of Shewa.

Upon learning that the Egyptians were advancing inland from Massawa, Menelik raised a large army to put an end to the revolts of Abba Wato, who sought the support of Yohannes IV. The latter was eventually captured by Menelik, who then seized the fortress of Magdala. He appointed Muhammad Ali as governor of Wello, to whom the local chiefs swore allegiance, as well as to the Negus of Shewa in September 1876 during the Meskel festival. Nevertheless, these "fine plans and fervent hopes" of becoming Emperor "went up in smoke" following Yohannes IV’s victories at the battles of Gundet and Gura. The Egyptian defeat convinced the majority of Ethiopians, particularly the Shoans, of the Emperor's military supremacy, and he took advantage of the victories to increase his arsenal. Menelik prepared a march north, but the lack of support from the local population led him to return to his kingdom. This failure was partly due to his inability to procure arms and ammunition despite several attempts; this was an opportunity to create initial contacts with European countries.

=== Internal strife in Shewa ===
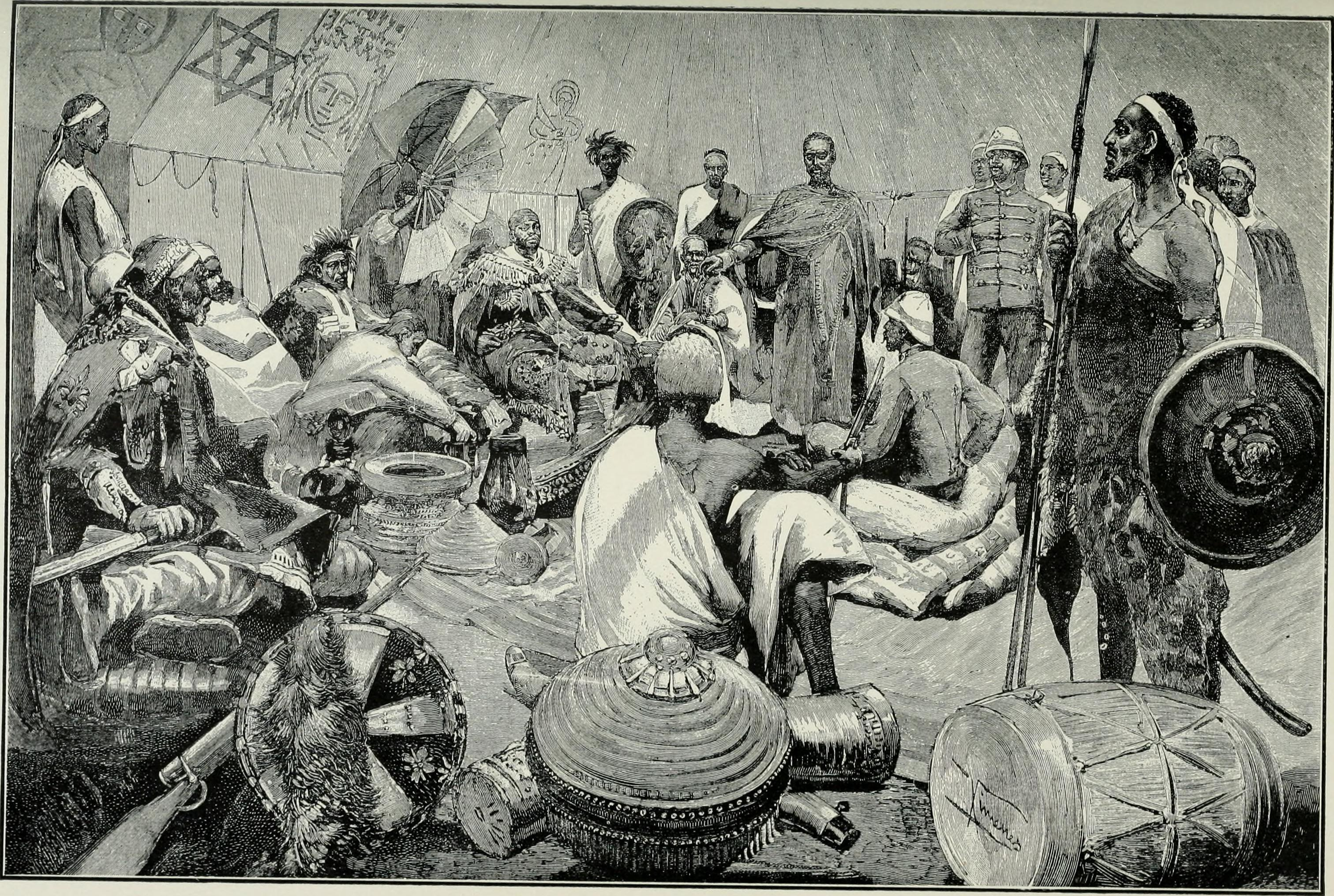
Menelik meeting British explorers

Besides his rival’s superior weaponry, Menelik’s failure was a consequence of internal strife in Shewa. In 1877, a rebellion instigated by Menelik’s wife Bafena began in the kingdom. Bafena wished to see one of her sons succeed his father on the throne of Shewa, but Menelik attempted to impose Meshesha Seyfu, his first cousin. After briefly leaving the kingdom, the latter returned and reconciled with Bafena in exchange for her lands; however, after the intervention of a council, they were returned to her. Finally, on 14 December 1876 Menelik imprisoned Meshesha in Gontcho in Argobba after his wife Bafena declared that his first cousin might be a traitor. As a result of this punishment against Meshesha, Menelik lost significant support.

Adding to this question of succession was a religious controversy: Bafena, like Yohannes IV, supported the doctrine of the double birth of Christ, called Qarra Haymanot, according to which the human and divine natures of Christ should not be separated (one nature coming from the Father and another from the Virgin Mary). Menelik, on the other hand, favored the doctrine of the triple birth, called Sost Lidat of Debre Lebanos, which held that Christ was born of the Father, through the operation of the Holy Spirit, and after nine months of gestation from the Virgin Mary.

In his quest for national unity, Yohannes IV needed to unify the country religiously; Bafena proposed to the Emperor that Menelik be overthrown. Her plan was to take advantage of her husband’s departure northward, a departure she had allegedly instigated, to place Meridazmatch Haile on the throne during the rainy season so that Menelik could not return to Shewa. Menelik would have been defeated by Yohannes IV, who would in turn have overthrown Haile and replaced him with one of Bafena's sons, while she remained regent until one of the heirs reached the age of majority.

This prompted Menelik to launch a campaign northward against Yohannes IV, but this expedition was poorly received by the Shoan troops, weary of conquests and unenthusiastic about crossing enemy territory only to then challenge better-equipped forces. The campaign was launched nonetheless, and Menelik left Shewa. At the same time, Haile entered Ankober, where he was proclaimed Negus of Shewa. A confrontation ensued between the troops of Azzaj Wolde Tsadeq and the Dejazmach Germame, the officials to whom Menelik had temporarily delegated power, and the forces of the newly proclaimed king. After two clashes, Haile was captured on 4 May 1877 and imprisoned in Ankober. Menelik suspected no complicity on Bafena's part in this attempt and appointed her regent by edict until his return, handing over power to her so she could restore order to his kingdom. The attempt having failed, Meshesha was freed and seized Mount Tamo, a strategic position.

Menelik’s return to Shewa on 25 May 1877 was not a consequence of his wife’s activities; he left Gojjam when he learned that Yohannes IV was advancing there to support Ras Adal Tessema. Once in Shewa, Menelik still believed in his wife and, after a brief siege of Tamo, asked Masia to mediate with Meshesha. A council demanded, among other things, the exile of Bafena, a decision Menelik refused as he went on campaign against Muhammed Ali, who had recently allied himself with Yohannes IV. After a victory by Menelik over the troops of the governor of Wello, a reconciliation ceremony was held on 20 December 1877 at Liche during which Meshesha was pardoned. Furthermore, he authorized Bafena's exile to a distant village although he still did not believe that she had betrayed him and rebelled.

=== Treaty of Wadara ===
At the beginning of 1878, Emperor Yohannes IV marched toward Shewa; Menelik attempted to secure peace, but the conditions imposed by the Emperor were too numerous: the deportation of Masaia, the obligation to supply the imperial army during the occupation of Shewa, an annual tribute of 500 slaves, 50,000 thalers, 500 mules, 1,000 horses, 50,000 head of cattle, as well as significant quantities of grain, meat, and butter. Furthermore, Menelik had to grant the imperial army free passage through his territory toward Debre Libanos; finally, he had to appear, naked to the waist with a stone around his neck, before the Emperor to beg for forgiveness and swear an oath of allegiance.

At the end of January 1878, Yohannes IV entered Menz and Menelik issued a mobilization decree: soldiers had to be on the battlefield before February 2. Children and the elderly were evacuated from the possible war zone and the entire treasure of Shewa was sent to Feqra Gemb. On February 3, 1878 Menelik and his army left Liche to travel to the region between the Engolla and Facho rivers. Between the 6th and 10th of February the troops clashed sporadically, then Menelik withdrew to Liche where a council was held. On 12 February three days later, representatives of both parties began negotiations. A series of conciliatory gestures from both sides followed, and a treaty was signed on 20 March 1878: the Treaty of Wadara. Among the main conditions for peace, Menelik had to formally submit, with a stone around his neck as tradition dictated, before the Emperor, thus renouncing his imperial ambitions. In exchange, the Negus of Shewa received a considerable portion of Wello. After submitting, Menelik negotiated alone with Yohannes IV and was crowned Negus of Shewa a few days later.

On 26 March 1878 Yohannes IV officially announced the celebration of Menelik’s coronation as Negus of Shewa, thus making him the first of his dynasty to receive the Emperor's official consent to bear the title of Negus; the ceremony took place in a large tent before numerous officials. The Emperor recognized, in his own words, Menelik as “king and master of a land conquered and possessed by your ancestors.” He also declared that whoever “attacks your kingdom attacks me, whoever makes war on you makes war on me. You are therefore my eldest son.” A few months later, Menelik sent a magnificent tribute to Yohannes IV, who is said to have wept and declared, “Only today am I Emperor.” Despite this submission and the tribute to be paid, the Negus of Shewa and his kingdom suffered no major damage, the army remained intact, as did his will to become the next emperor.

=== First phase of expansion ===
Menelik's campaigns 1879–89

Menelik, now confined to the administration of Shewa, aspired to expand his domains to the southern regions which had long been outside Ethiopian control. While his defeat at the hands of Yohannes IV forced him to wait before ascending the imperial throne, it did little to prevent him from targeting territories to the west, south, and east. The organization of these campaigns was driven by financial needs (increasing tax revenue through the conquest of new territories) and commercial needs: Shewa sought to control the south, rich in natural resources, and to dominate the routes leading to the port markets of Zeila, Obock, and Tadjoura. During this campaign, Menelik had to compete with Negus Tekle Haimanot of Gojjam, who had the same objectives of expansion. He decisively defeated the Gojjames at the Battle of Embabo on June 6 or June 7, 1882, according to sources. Which ended in the defeat and expulsion of Negus Tekle Haimanot of Gojjam from the Oromo lands. The Shoan victory was in reality twofold, since, in addition to ensuring Menelik’s domination of the Southwest, an area crossed by foreign merchants (mainly French), it sent an indirect but clear message to Yohannes IV, supporter of Tekle Haimanot: the Negus of Shewa maintained imperial ambitions.

During these early campaigns, from 1879 to 1884 the first, along the Rift Valley, covering the Hadiya kingdom and the territories inhabited by the Kambata, the Silté, and the Welaytas; the second conquest, toward the Arsi and the Bale Plateau, where the conquest began around 1881 but was not completed until 1890. In 1881, Ras Gobana Dache forced Kaffa to pay tribute; Jimma, Limmu, Gera, and Guma became tributary regions. The troops of Ras Darge Sahle Selassie faced resistance from the Arsi, who temporarily yielded in 1883 and then completely in 1886, when their territory came under Shoan control.

The expansion headed west toward Sudan, which saw Ras Gobana Dacche occupy Wollega in 1886 when Menelik moved his capital to Addis Ababa, and the following year the Shoan army incorporated Illubabor, pushing the western borders back to the Gibe River. On 6 January 1887, following the defeat of Emir Abd Allah II ibn Ali Abd ash-Shakur at the Battle of Chelenqo, Harar was annexed to the Kingdom of Shewa. This was a significant commercial victory due to the presence of foreign traders and the city’s proximity to the ports of Zeila and Berbera. These areas were to be exploited to generate a surplus for the export of goods that could not be obtained from the northern Shewan heartland. This trade initially focused largely on animal products, notably ivory and musk (zibeth), as well as skins, ostrich feathers, and gold, but these were gradually supplanted by coffee. Menelik also benefited from a significant slave trade, conducted by Muslim entrepreneurs but taxed by the Shewan state. The arms acquired in exchange enabled the Shewans to continue expanding their conquests year after year. The new Shewan administration, primarily military, was largely based on the katamas, garrison towns that later gave rise to cities of regional importance such as Yirgalem in Sidamo or Goba in Bale. The katamas were always built at altitudes above 1,000 meters to house the neftenya people, originally from the highlands, who feared malaria and the climate of the lowlands.

From the end of Yohannes IV’s reign, the Shewa court became a major center of Ethiopian influence, both nationally and internationally. Diplomats, merchants, adventurers, and many foreigners visited the court of Entoto (notably the young poet Arthur Rimbaud and the painter Paul Buffet among the French); some of them traded their weapons for natural resources. The most important of whom, the Swiss engineer Alfred Ilg, arrived in Shewa in 1879 and remained for 29 years. By far the most influential European ever to work in the Ethiopian government service, Ilg rapidly became a trusted counsellor concerned not only with technical matters, but with critical issues in Menelik's relations with European powers. He eventually received the title of Bitwoded, the only foreigner ever to do so. France and Italy, among others, thus introduced numerous modern weapons into the Shewa kingdom, giving Menelik's troops a technological advantage.

== Reign ==
=== Succession ===
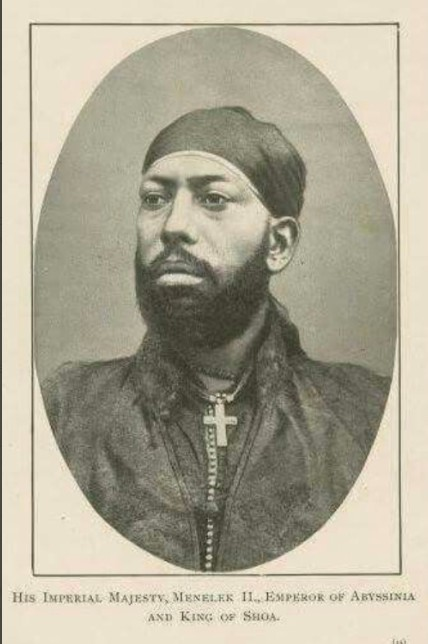
Portrait of Menelik II

On 10 March 1889, Emperor Yohannes IV was killed fighting the Mahdists during the Battle of Gallabat (Metemma). With his dying breath, Yohannes declared his natural son, Dejazemach Mengesha Yohannes, to be his heir. On 25 March, upon hearing of the death of Yohannes, Menelik immediately proclaimed himself emperor.

In the end, Menelik was able to obtain the allegiance of a large majority of the Ethiopian nobility. On 3 November 1889, Menelik was consecrated and crowned emperor before a glittering crowd of dignitaries and clergy by Abuna Mattewos, Bishop of Shewa, at the Church of Mary on Mount Entoto. Menelik justified his coronation by asserting that his own branch descended from Solomon through the male line, while the Gondar branch, that of Yohannes IV, descended through the female line. Both branches, therefore, had equal rights to rule, even though the Gondar line was more ancient. The newly consecrated and crowned Emperor Menelik II quickly toured the north in force. He received the submission of the local officials in Lasta, Yejju, Gojjam, Wollo, and Begemder.

=== The continued expansion of the Empire ===
Menelik's campaigns 1889–96

Having ascended the imperial throne, Menelik launched a second period of territorial conquests, interrupted in 1896 by the conflict with Italy. These campaigns, which began in 1894, aimed to address the great famine Kifou Qen (“terrible time”). The famine was caused by rinderpest, an infectious viral cattle disease which wiped out most of the national livestock, killing over 90% of the cattle. The native cattle population had no prior exposure and were unable to fight off the disease.

Driven by famine, the survivors migrated south to the territories recently incorporated into Shewa; among the emigrants, many Tigrayan and Gondarian soldiers joined Menelik's army. At the same time, the Italian government demanded payment of a debt of 4 million lire incurred in 1890. To resolve the crisis, Menelik decided to expand the southern borders: in 1889, the entire Gurage region was annexed; Bale, Sidamo (excluding Borana), the Ogaden, and Welayta were occupied from 1891 onward and subsequently incorporated into the Empire. Ras Welde Giyorgis Aboye conquered Konta and Kulo; in 1893, the integration of Kambata, occupied since 1890, was completed. In 1894, the integration of the new territories continued: Ras Gobena Dacche to the southwest, Ras Mekonnen Welde Mikael to the Ogaden, Ras Welde Giyorgis Aboye to Kaffa, in the province of Gofa; in the same year, Wollamo was conquered.

=== Wuchale Treaty ===
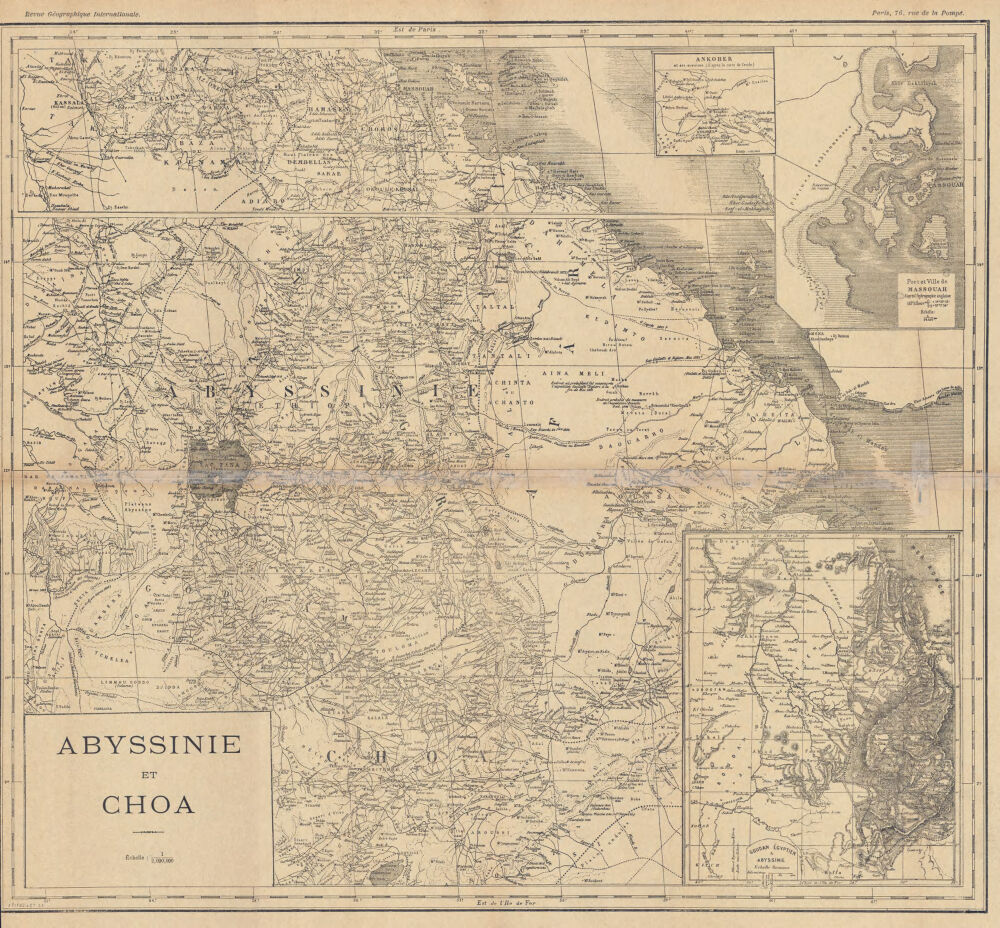
Abyssinia (Ethiopia) in an 1891 map

Menelik and the Italian envoy Count Pietro Antonelli had many interactions and had come to an agreement for a Friendship treaty between Shewa and Italy. The agreement was that Italy would help Menelik become the King of Abyssinia however, he shall not contest the Eritrea historical territories of Bogos, Akele Guzay, and Hamasien with the Mareb, Belessa, and Mai Muna rivers as the frontier of the country Eritrea to become an Italian territory. Menelik did not care about the Italians taking over Eritrea including Assab and Hamasien as he was receiving ammunition and modern armanents to secure his ambitions to the throne in Abyssinia.

On 2 May 1889, while claiming the throne against Ras Mengesha Yohannes, the natural son of Emperor Yohannes IV, Menelik concluded a treaty with Italy at Wuchale (Uccialli in Italian) in Wollo province. On the signing of the treaty, Menelik said "The territories north of the Merab Milesh (i.e. Eritrea) do not belong to Abyssinia nor are under my rule. I am the Emperor of Abyssinia. The land referred to as Eritrea is not peopled by Abyssinians – they are Adals, Bejaa, and Tigres. Abyssinia will defend his territories but will not fight for foreign lands, which Eritrea is to my knowledge." Under the treaty, Ethiopia and Italy agreed to define the boundary between Eritrea and Ethiopia. For example, both Ethiopia and Italy agreed that Arafali, Halai, Segeneiti, and Asmara were villages within the Italian border. Also, the Italians agreed not to harass Ethiopian traders and to allow safe passage for Ethiopian goods, particularly military weapons. The treaty also guaranteed that the Ethiopian government would have ownership of the Monastery of Debre Bizen but would not use it for military purposes.

However, there were two versions of the treaty, one in Italian and another in Amharic. Unbeknownst to Menelik the Italian version gave Italy more power than the two had agreed to. The Italians believed they had tricked Menelik into giving allegiance to Italy. To their surprise, upon learning about the alteration, Menelik rejected the treaty. The Italians attempted to bribe him with two million rounds of ammunition but he refused. Then the Italians approached Ras Mengesha of Tigray in an attempt to create a civil war, however, Ras Mengesha, understanding that Ethiopia's independence was at stake, refused to be a puppet for the Italians. The Italians, therefore, prepared to attack Ethiopia with an army led by Oreste Baratieri. Subsequently, the Italians declared war and launched an invasion of Ethiopia.

=== Italo-Ethiopian War ===
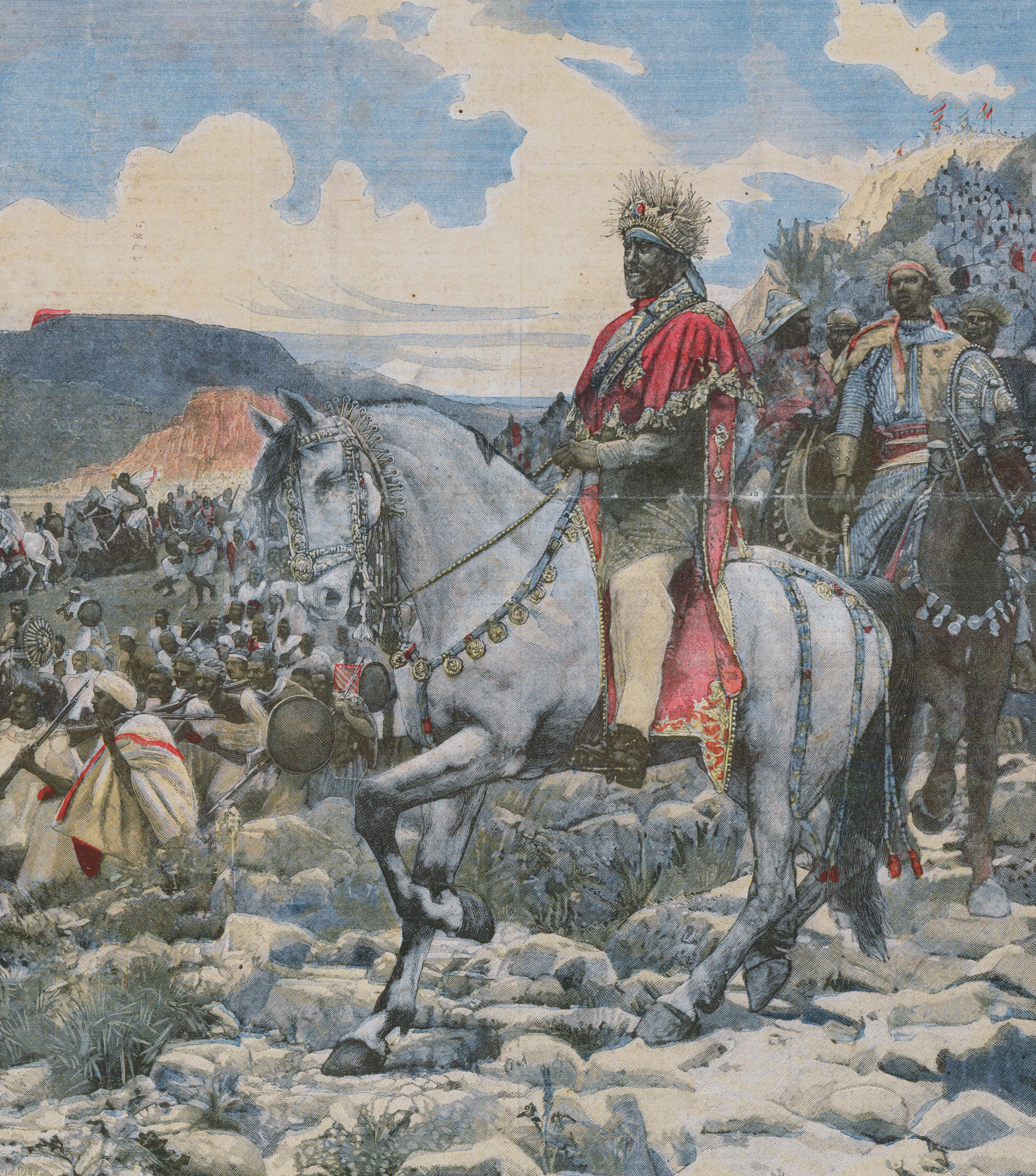
Emperor Menelik II at the Battle of Adwa. Le Petit Journal, 1898

Menelik's disagreement with Article 17 of the treaty led to the Battle of Adwa. Before the Italians could launch the invasion, Eritreans rebelled in an attempt to push the Italians out of Eritrea and prevent their invasion of Ethiopia. The rebellion was unsuccessful. However, some Eritreans managed to make their way to the Ethiopian camp and jointly fought the Italians at Adwa.

On 17 September 1895, Menelik ordered all of the Ethiopian nobility to call out their banners and raise their feudal hosts, stating: "An enemy has come across the sea. He has broken through our frontiers to destroy our fatherland and our faith. I allowed him to seize my possessions and I entered upon lengthy negotiations with him in hopes of obtaining justice without bloodshed. But the enemy refuses to listen. He undermines our territories and our people like a mole. Enough! With the help of God, I will defend the inheritance of my forefathers and drive back the invader by force of arms. Let every man who has sufficient strength accompany me. And he who has not, let him pray for us". Menelik's opponent, General Oreste Baratieri, underestimated the size of the Ethiopian force, predicting that Menelik could only field 30,000 men.

Despite the dismissive Italian claim that Ethiopia was a barbaric African nation whose men were no match for white troops, the Ethiopians were better armed, being equipped with thousands of modern rifles and Hotchkiss guns together with ammunition and shells which were superior to the Italian rifles and artillery. Menelik had ensured that his infantry and artillerymen were properly trained in their use, giving the Ethiopians a crucial advantage as the Hotchkiss artillery could fire more rapidly than the Italian artillery. In 1887 a British diplomat, Gerald Portal, wrote after seeing the Ethiopian feudal hosts parade before him, the Ethiopians were "...redeemed by the possession of unbounded courage, by a disregard of death, and by a national pride, which leads them to look down on every human being who has not had the good fortune to be born an Abyssinian [Ethiopian]".

The Ethiopian vanguard attacked an Italian force led by Major Toselli on 7 December 1895 at Boota Hill. The Ethiopians attacked a force of 350 Eritrean irregulars on the left flank, who collapsed under the Ethiopian assault, causing Toselli to send two companies of Italian infantry who halted the Ethiopian advance. Just as Toselli was rejoicing in his apparent victory, the main Ethiopian assault came down on his right flank, causing Toselli to order a retreat. The emperor's best general, Ras Makonnen, had occupied the road leading back to Eritrea, and launched a surprise attack, which routed the Italians. The Battle of Amba Alagi ended with an Italian force of 2,150 men losing 1,000 men and 20 officers killed.

Ras Makonnen followed up that victory by defeating General Arimondi and forcing the Italians to retreat to the fort at Mekele. Ras Makonnen laid siege to the fort, and on the morning of 7 January 1896, the defenders of the fort spotted a huge red tent among the besiegers, showing that the emperor had arrived. On 8 January 1896, the emperor's elite Shoan infantry captured the fort's well, and then beat off desperate Italian attempts to retake the well. On 19 January 1896, the fort's commander, Major Galliano, whose men were dying of dehydration, raised the white flag of surrender. Major Galliano and his men were allowed to march out, surrender their arms, and go free. Menelik stated he allowed the Italians to go free "to give proof of my Christian faith," saying his quarrel was with the Italian government of Prime Minister Francesco Crispi that was trying to conquer his nation, not the ordinary Italian soldiers who been conscripted against their will to fight in the war. Menelik's magnanimity to the defenders of Fort Mekele may have been an act of psychological warfare. Menelik knew from talking to French and Russian diplomats that the war and Crispi himself were unpopular in Italy, and one of the main points of Crispi's propaganda was allegations of atrocities against Italian POWs. From Menelik's viewpoint allowing the Italian POWs to go free and unharmed was the best way of rebutting this propaganda and undermining public support for Crispi.

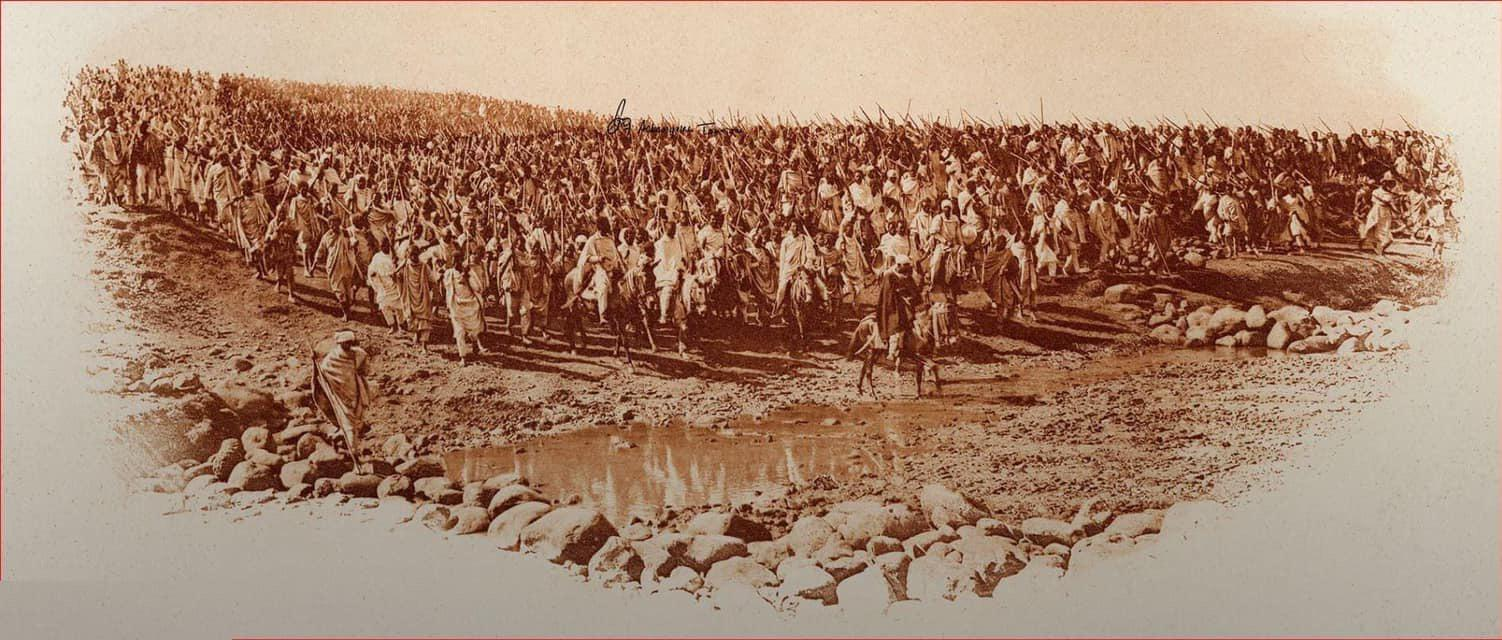
Menelik and his army arriving in Addis Ababa after the Battle of Adwa

Crispi sent another 15,000 men to the Horn of Africa and ordered the main Italian commander, General Oreste Baratieri, to finish off the "barbarians". As Baratieri dithered, Menelik was forced to pull back on 17 February 1896 as his huge host was running out of food. After Crispi sent an insulting telegram accusing Baratieri of cowardice, on 28 February 1896 the Italians decided to seek battle with Menelik. On 1 March 1896, the two armies met at Adwa. The Ethiopians came out victorious.

With victory at Adwa and the Italian colonial army defeated, Eritrea was Menelik's for the taking but no order to occupy was given. Apart from a few cavalry units, the bulk of the Ethiopian army did not pursue the defeated Italians; only between March 3 and 4 did Ras Mangasha's troops advance to the old Italian camp at Sauria, while Dejacc Area advanced to the Mareb River. The Ethiopian army was severely weakened by losses suffered in battle, disease, and food shortages, so Menelik ordered a retreat to Addis Ababa, leaving only a few units under the command of Ras Alula and Ras Mangasha in Tigray. He instead sought to restore the peace that had been broken by the Italians and their treaty manipulation seven years before. Subsequently, the Treaty of Addis Ababa was reached between the two nations. Italy was forced to recognise the absolute independence of Ethiopia, as described in Article 3 of the treaty.

=== The final phase of expansion ===
Menelik's campaigns 1897–1904

Following the victory at Adwa, Menelik launched a third and final phase of conquests from 1896 to 1900. The conflict with Italy reinforced his belief in the need to create a buffer zone against colonialism. In 1896–1897, expeditions were launched into Borana (near Sidamo). At the same time, Fitawrari Habte Giyorgis, having built a fort at Mega, controlled the Konso region. The Kaffa kingdom initially resisted and refused to pay tribute before being completely conquered. In 1898, Beni Shangul and the border with Sudan were controlled; Ras Welde Giyorgis Aboye subdued Goldea and Maji, reaching Lake Rudolf (now Lake Turkana). Finally, also in 1898, Ras Tassama annexed Massonge and Gimirra. Later, in 1899, Dejazmach Nikolay Leontiev, a Russian, led expeditions along the southern border of Lake Rudolf. Thus ended two decades of military campaigns.

=== Modernization ===
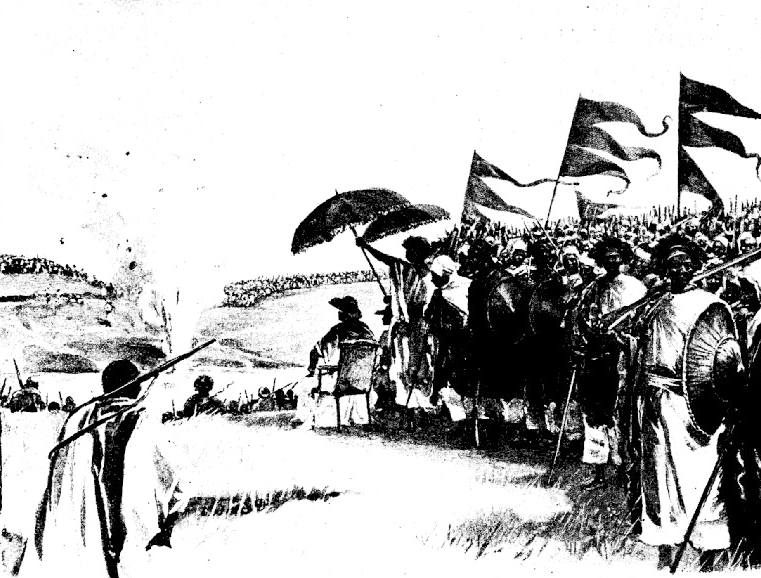
Emperor Menelik II (far right seated) with retinues watching dynamite testing near Addis Ababa early 1890s. Published in the French magazine Le Tour du Monde (1896 issue)

Menelik II knew that military force alone could not protect his empire. Thus, without the development of a truly comprehensive plan, Ethiopia entered a phase of modernization, a transformation explained, among other things, by the sovereign's interest in new technologies. A segment of the imperial aristocracy, represented by Taytu Betul, viewed the massive influx of Western technology with vigilance, even reluctance. Conversely, another faction of the nobility, including Ras Mekonnen Welde Mikael (1852-1906), influenced by his travels to Europe in 1896 and 1902, proved far more open to this modernization. In order not to alarm the conservatives and out of personal conviction, Menelik dedicated himself to preserving Ethiopian culture and traditions. Following the rush by the major powers to establish diplomatic relations following the Ethiopian victory at Adwa, more and more Westerners began to travel to Ethiopia looking for trade, farming, hunting, and mineral exploration concessions.

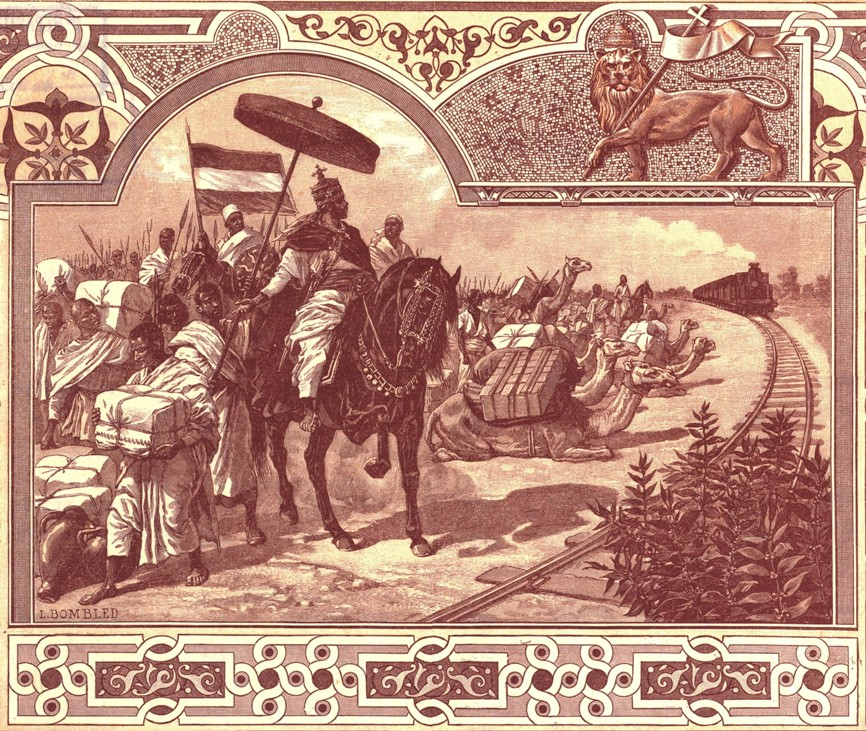
Menelik II inspecting the railway with his entourage and a caravan of camels.

In 1894, Menelik granted a concession for the building of a railway to his capital from the French port of Djibouti but, alarmed by a claim made by France in 1902 to control of the line in Ethiopian territory, he ordered a stop for four years on the extension of the railway beyond Dire Dawa. In 1906 when France, the United Kingdom, and Italy agreed on the subject, granting control to a joint venture corporation, Menelik officially reaffirmed his full sovereign rights over the whole of his empire.

In terms of transport and communications, roads (Addis Ababa–Addis Alem and Dire Dawa–Harar) and bridges were built; in the capital, bicycles, imported by Bentley and C. Halle, made their appearance in December 1907 and automobiles were introduced there in January 1908 by A. Holtz. The quintessential symbol remains the Franco-Ethiopian Railway (now the Djibouti-Ethiopian Railway), whose construction, begun in 1897, was completed in 1917. A postal system was established in 1893 and post offices opened the following year. The central office, staffed by Frenchmen, developed urban service; two years later, Ethiopia joined the Universal Postal Union. In the field of education, public schools were built: the first in 1906, a second in 1908 (the Menelik II School in Addis Ababa), and finally a third in Harar; moreover, in 1894, students went abroad for the first time, some as far as Russia. On the health front, a vaccination campaign against smallpox was launched in 1898; various hospitals were built: the Russian Red Cross hospital (1897), the Ras Mekonnen hospital in Harar (1902), and the Menelik II hospital (1910).

Modernization also affected the economic sector: in 1892, the tax system was reorganized. The new taxation system (gebbar maderia) differed qualitatively from the system in place under his predecessors, particularly regarding army pay, revenue administration, and troop supplies. This new system was far more centralized; the tax rate was directly linked to military needs, based on a measure of the needs of an ordinary soldier, and the soldier, now a landowner, became directly responsible for his own supplies. Consequently, land taxes came under the direct administration of the ras. This form of taxation secured army pay and facilitated increased mobilization of both the peasantry and local ras. Furthermore, the system, directly controlled by the state, proved much more flexible (facilitating the transfer of resources from one region to another) and allowed for a considerable increase in the revenues of the Ethiopian Empire. In 1894 a form of universal taxation was introduced, the Asrat tax, which applied to local nobles as well as soldiers and landowners.

The old monetary system, linked to the Maria Theresa thaler of Austria, was replaced by a new one, based on the Menelik thaler, which appeared in 1894 and was minted in Paris and then in Addis Ababa from 1897, where the Austrian engineer Willy Henze had established a mint a year earlier. In 1903, a central bank producing the currency was created. Two years later, in March, the Bank of Abyssinia was established; Ethiopians quickly nicknamed it yé ingliz bank (“the English bank,” in Amharic), referring to the English capital that flowed through Egypt. The bank controlled the national financial system, and the first banknotes were printed as early as 1914.

In 1908, following a judicial reform, the country was divided into six districts, each maintaining contact with Shoa and comprising two wember (judges) appointed by the Emperor. In the event of a disagreement between two judges, the case was brought before the Afe negus, a supreme judge. Furthermore, the reform provided for the court to appoint two officials to record and keep the minutes of proceedings (the equivalent of a clerk).

Finally, at the political level, a Cabinet of Ministers was established on October 25, 1907. Its first president was Fitawrari Habte Giyorgis. Initially symbolic, the institution faced a certain regional entrenchment of the monarchy; the Addis Ababa court was still considered the court of the Shewa and not the national court. Nevertheless, the Cabinet gradually managed to acquire a life of its own. More generally, other elements contributed to this period of modernization: a print media was founded in 1911, hotels and restaurants appeared in the capital, which became a cosmopolitan city: traders, merchants, manufacturers, and adventurers came from all over (Armenians, Russians, Greeks, Indians, French).

=== Decline and death ===
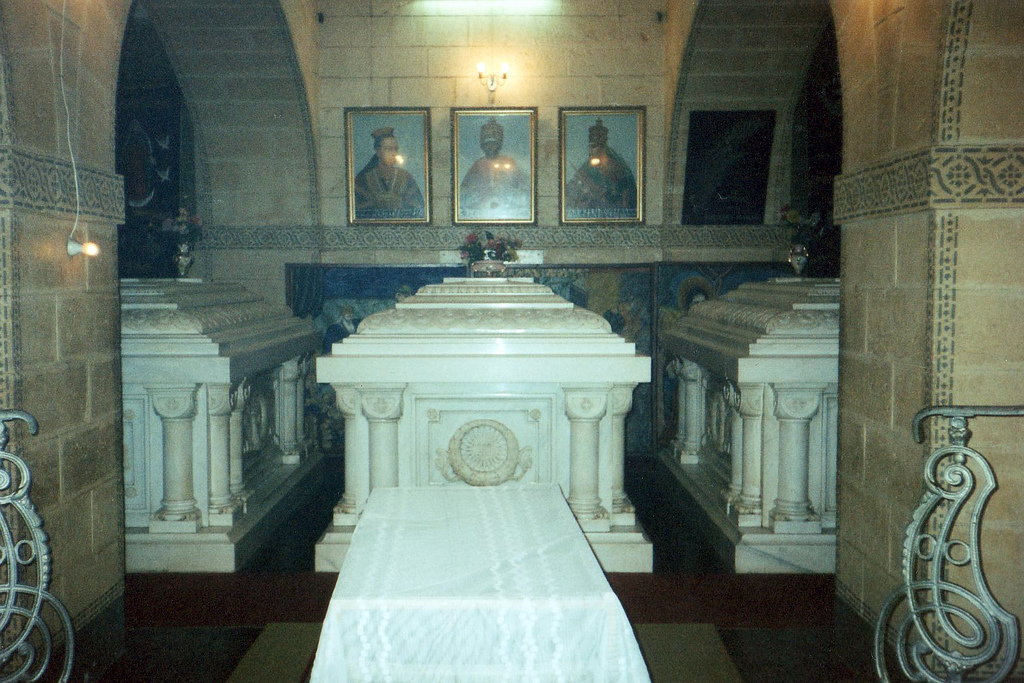
Menelik's Mausoleum

In mid-1906, Menelik suffered a massive stroke which triggered a decline in his health, and he became seriously ill by January 1907. As Menelik's health deteriorated, it raised concerns about potential political instability in Ethiopia, as a result the British, French and Italians signed a Tripartite Treaty in December 1906 to spilt the empire between themselves if it collapsed. Thus, the establishment in 1907 of the Cabinet of Ministers was intended to address fears that the Empire might be left without an effective governing institution. He was struck by another stroke in May 1908, and in April 1909 a third stroke left Menelik paralyzed and barely able to speak.

The question of succession was being closely followed by the sovereign's wife, Taytu, who wished to shift imperial power towards Gondar, her region of origin, and her family, the Yejju. On May 18, 1909, at the proclamation of Menelik's will, Iyasu was designated as heir presumptive, a gesture intended to calm the various warring factions. However, at the last moment, Taytu managed to have the will changed so that the heir was designated by the word Lij (“my child”, in Amharic) in order to maintain the ambiguity between Iyasu (1897-1935), Menelik's grandson, and Zewditu, the sovereign's daughter. Taytu's objective was to remove Iyasu from power, as he was the son of Ras Mikael, and she feared that the young Lij rise to power would strengthen the province at the expense of the North of the Empire. Zewditu, for her part, was the wife of Gugsa Welle, Taytu's nephew, and she therefore hoped that the eventual son of the new imperial couple will quickly ascend to the throne in order to restore the Yejju dynasty.

On 30 October 1909, the Council of Ministers had the will proclaimed, incorporating Iyasu's name and appointing Ras Bitwoded Tessema Nadew as regent. Power remained de facto in the hands of Taytu, at Menelik's bedside; to rid themselves of his influence, the veterans of the Emperor's army met on 21 March 1910, and decided to give the sovereign's wife two choices: relegation to the precincts of the Entoto church or the right to remain with Menelik without involving herself in political affairs. A week later, she accepted the second option. In March 1910, power officially passed from Menelik to Tessema Nadew until his death on 10 April 1911.

Meanwhile, as Menelik's health deteriorated; high-ranking officials became increasingly concerned on 2 September 1910, when he remained completely unconscious for nearly four hours. The regency did not proceed as planned, and after Tessema's death, Iyasu emerged as the sole potential heir. From 1910 to 1913, the sovereign's death was announced several times, each time incorrectly; it was during the night of 12 December to 13 December 1913 that Menelik II died. He was buried in a mausoleum in Addis Ababa, at the Menelik Palace.

== Personal life ==
Menelik's Phonograph Message to Queen Victoria, 1898

The British journalist Augustus B. Wylde wrote after meeting Menelik: "I had found him a man of great kindness, a remarkably shrewd and clever man and very well informed on most things except on England and her resources; his information on our country evidently having been obtained from persons entirely unfriendly to us; and who did not want Englishmen to have any diplomatic or commercial transactions whatever with Abyssinia [Ethiopia]".

After meeting him, Count Gleichen wrote: "In height he stands about six feet, without shoes, and is stoutly built. His skin is very dark, and he wears a short curly beard and moustache. His face is heavy in cast, but is redeemed from positive plainness by an extremely pleasant expression and a pair of most intelligent eyes. His smile is very wide, and shows an excellent set of teeth. He generally wears a large black Quaker hat over a white silk handkerchief tied round his head, and a black silk gold-embroidered cloak over a profusion of white linen underclothing".

=== Wives ===
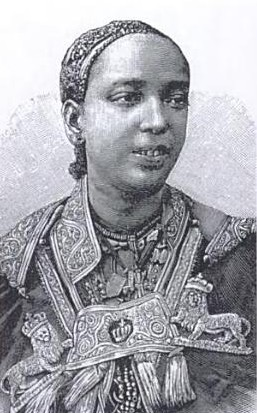
Taytu Betul, the third wife of Menelik

Menelik married three times but he did not have any legitimate children with any of his wives. However, he is reputed to have fathered several children with women who were not his wives, and he recognized three of those children as being his progeny.

In 1864, Menelik married Woizero Altash Tewodros, whom he divorced in 1865; the marriage produced no children. Altash Tewodros was a daughter of Emperor Tewodros II. She and Menelik were married during the time that Menelik was held captive by Tewodros. The marriage ended when Menelik escaped captivity, abandoning her. She was subsequently remarried to Dejazmatch Bariaw Paulos of Adwa.

In 1865, the same year he divorced his first wife, Menelik married the much older noblewoman Woizero Bafena Wolde Michael. This marriage was also childless, and they were married for seventeen years before being divorced in 1882. Menelik was very fond of his wife, but she apparently did not have a sincere affection for him. Woizero Befana had several children from previous marriages and was more interested in securing their welfare than in the welfare of her present husband. For many years, she was widely suspected of being secretly in touch with Emperor Yohannes IV in her ambition to replace her husband on the throne of Shewa with one of her sons from a previous marriage. Finally, she was implicated in a plot to overthrow Menelik when he was King of Shewa. With the failure of her plot, Woizero Befana was separated from Menelik, but Menelik apparently was still deeply attached to her. An attempt at reconciliation failed, but when his relatives and courtiers suggested new young wives to the king, he would sadly say "You ask me to look at these women with the same eyes that once gazed upon Befana?", paying tribute both to his ex-wife's beauty and his own continuous attachment to her.

Finally, Menelik divorced his treasonous wife in 1882, and in 1883, he married Taytu Betul. Menelik's new wife had been married four times previously, and he became her fifth husband. They were married in a full communion church service and the marriage was thus fully canonical and indissoluble, which had not been the case with either of Menelik's previous wives. The marriage, which proved childless, would last until his death. Taytu Betul would become empress consort upon her husband's succession, and would become the most powerful consort of an Ethiopian monarch since Empress Mentewab. She enjoyed considerable influence on Menelik and his court until the end, something which was aided by her own family background. Empress Taytu Betul was a noblewoman of imperial blood and a member of one of the leading families of the regions of Semien, Yejju in modern Wollo, and Begemder. Her paternal uncle, Dejazmatch Wube Haile Maryam of Semien, had been the ruler of Tigray and much of northern Ethiopia. She and her uncle Ras Wube were two of the most powerful people among descendants of Ras Gugsa Mursa, a ruler of Oromo descent from the house of was Sheik of Wollo. Emperor Yohannes was able to broaden his power base in northern Ethiopia through Taytu's family connections in Begemider, Semien and Yejju; she also served him as his close adviser, and went to the Battle of Adwa with 5,000 troops of her own. From 1906, for all intents and purposes, Taytu Betul ruled in Menelik's stead during his infirmity. Menelik and Taytu Betul personally owned 70,000 slaves. Abba Jifar II is also said to have had more than 10,000 slaves and allowed his armies to enslave the captives during a battle with all his neighboring clans. This practice was common between various tribes and clans of Ethiopia for thousands of years.

Taytu arranged political marriages between her Yejju and Semien relatives and key Shewan aristocrates like Ras Woldegyorgis Aboye, who was Governor of Kaffa, Ras Mekonen who was governor of Harar, and Menelik's eldest daughter Zewditu Menelik who became Nigeste Negestat of the empire after the overthrow of Lij Iyasu. Taytu's step daughter, Zewditu, was married to her nephew Ras Gugsa Welle who administered Begemider up to the 1930s.

=== Natural children ===
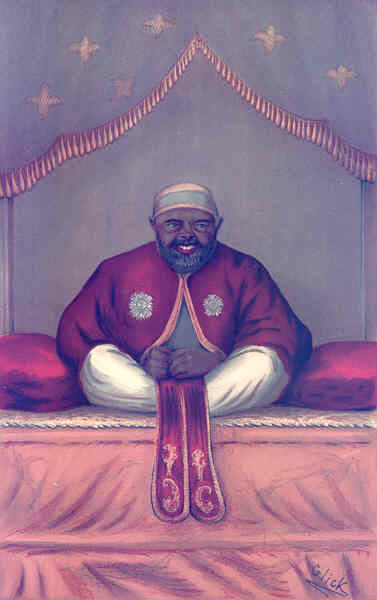
Menelik caricatured by Glick for Vanity Fair, 1897

Previous to his marriage to Taytu Betul, Menelik fathered several natural children. Among them, he chose to recognise three specific children (two daughters and one son) as being his progeny. These were:

1. A daughter, Woizero Shoaregga Menelik, born 1867. (Note: Also spelled "Shoaregga" and "Shewa Regga".) She would marry twice and become the mother of:
  - A son, Abeto Wossen Seged Wodajo, born of the first marriage; never considered for the succession due to dwarfism
  - A daughter, Woizero Zenebework Mikael, who was married at age twelve and died in childbirth one year later
  - A son, the purported Emperor Iyasu V. He nominally succeeded upon Menelik's death in 1913, but was never crowned; he was deposed in 1916 by powerful nobles.
2. A daughter, Woizero (later Empress) Zewditu Menelik, born 1876, died 1930. (Note: Eventually Empress of Ethiopia.) She married four times and had some children, but none of them survived to adulthood. She was proclaimed Empress in her own right in 1916, but was a figurehead, with ruling power in the hands of regent Ras Tafari Makonnen, who succeeded her in 1930 as Emperor Haile Selassie.
3. A son, Abeto Asfa Wossen Menelik, born 1873. He died unwed and childless when he was about fifteen years of age.

Menelik's only recognised son, Abeto Asfa Wossen Menelik, died unwed and childless when he was about fifteen years of age, leaving him with only two daughters. The elder daughter, Woizero Shoaregga, was first married to Dejazmatch Wodajo Gobena, the son of Ras Gobena Dachi. They had a son, Abeto Wossen Seged Wodajo, but this grandson of Menelik was eliminated from the succession due to dwarfism. In 1892, twenty-five-year-old Woizero Shoaregga was married for a second time to forty-two-year-old Ras Mikael of Wollo. They had two children, namely a daughter, Woizero Zenebework Mikael, who would be married at the age of twelve to the much older Ras Bezabih Tekle Haymanot of Gojjam, and would die in childbirth a year later; and a son, Lij (Note: Roughly equivalent to Child.) Iyasu, who would nominally succeed as emperor after Menelik's death in 1913, but would never be crowned, and would be deposed by powerful nobles in favour of Menelik's younger daughter Zewditu in 1916.

Menelik's younger daughter, Zewditu Menelik, had a long and chequered life. She was married four times, and eventually became empress in her own right, the first woman to hold that position in Ethiopia since the Queen of Sheba. She was only ten years old when Menelik got her married to Ras Araya Selassie Yohannes, the fifteen-year-old son of Emperor Yohannes IV, in 1886. In May 1888, Ras Araya Selassie died and Zewditu became a widow at age twelve. She was married two more times for brief periods to Gwangul Zegeye and Wube Atnaf Seged before marrying Gugsa Welle in 1900. Gugsa Welle was the nephew of Empress Taytu Betul, Menelik's third wife. Zewditu had some children, but none of them survived to adulthood. Menelik died in 1913, and his grandson Iyasu claimed the throne on principle of seniority. However, it was suspected that Iyasu was a secret convert to Islam, which was the religion of his paternal ancestors, and having a Muslim on the throne would have grave implications for Ethiopia in future generations. Therefore, Iyasu was never crowned; he was deposed by nobles in 1916, in favour of his aunt, Zewditu. However, Zewditu (aged 40 at that time) had no surviving children (all her children had died young) and the nobles did not want her husband and his family to exercise power and eventually occupy the throne. Therefore, Zewditu's cousin Ras Tafari Makonnen was named both heir to the throne and regent of the empire. Zewditu had ceremonial duties to perform and wielded powers of arbitration and moral influence, but ruling power was vested in the hands of regent Ras Tafari Makonnen, who succeeded her as Emperor Haile Selassie in 1930.

Apart from the three recognised natural children, Menelik was rumoured to be the father of some other children also. These include Ras Birru Wolde Gabriel and Dejazmach Kebede Tessema. The latter, in turn, was later rumoured to be the natural grandfather of Colonel Mengistu Haile Mariam, the communist leader of the Derg, who eventually deposed the monarchy and assumed power in Ethiopia from 1977 to 1991.

== Legacy ==
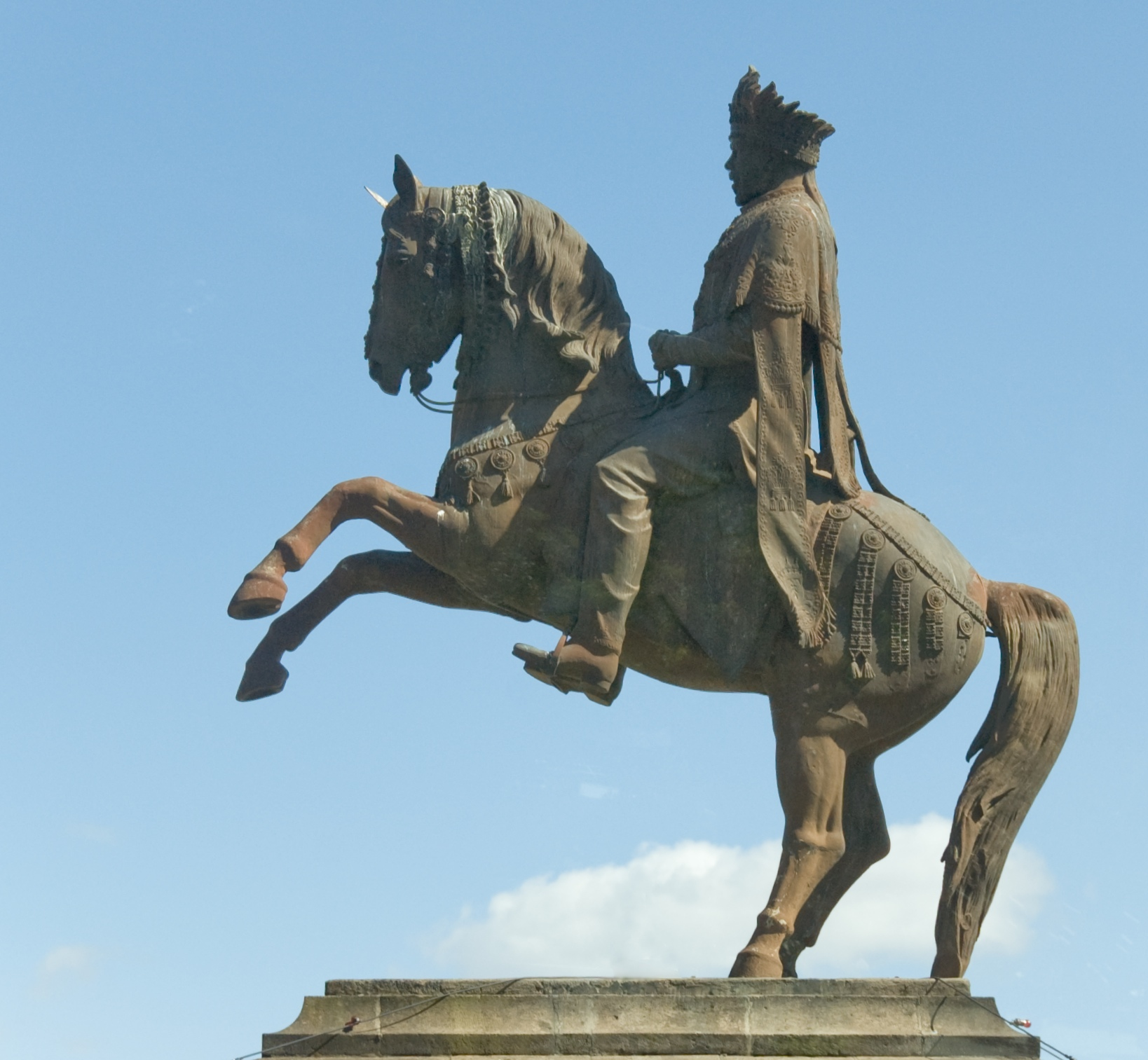
Equestrian statue of Emperor Menelik II, the victor of Adwa. The statue was erected by Emperor Haile Selassie and dedicated on the day before his coronation in 1930, in memory of his predecessor.

The Adwa Victory Day is celebrated in March annually, and it would also inspire Pan-African movements around the globe.

Despite being generally considered the founder of modern Ethiopia, Menelik's legacy also garnered controversies due to the atrocities committed by his army against civilians and combatants during the annexation of territories into his empire, which are considered by many historians as constituting genocide. According to Awol Allo:

The historical figure that masterminded the victory at Adwa, Emperor Menelik II, also presided over some of the most brutal atrocities committed against the various groups in the southern part of the country, particularly the Oromos, as they resisted his southward expansion. For Oromos, Menelik II is devil incarnate and is beyond redemption. Perhaps, the association of Adwa with Menelik II is the single most important reason behind Oromo ambivalence towards this historical event.

A desire to share in the glamor Menelik enjoyed after his victory over Italy may explain an improbable Serb legend, recounted by English anthropologist Mary E. Durham, portraying Menelik and the Serb king of Montenegro as kinsmen, based on little more than the similarity between the Ethiopian honorific Negus and the name of the Herzegovinian village, Njegushi, from which the Montenegrin royal family originated:

When these Herzegovinese migrated to Montenegro, a large body of them went yet farther afield and settled in the mountains of Abyssinia, among them a branch of the family of Petrovich of Njegushi, from which is directly descended Menelik, who preserves the title of Negus and is a distant cousin of Prince Nikola of Montenegro, and to this large admixture of Slav blood the Abyssinians owe their fine stature and their high standard of civilisation, as compared with the neighbouring African tribes.

Menelik is featured as the leader of the Ethiopian civilization in the New Frontier season pass of the 4X video game Civilization VI and the inspiration for Menelek XIV, fictional Emperor of Abyssinia in the novel Beyond Thirty by Edgar Rice Burroughs.

== See also ==
- Ilemi Triangle
- Paul Merab
- 1890s African rinderpest epizootic
- First Italo-Ethiopian War

== Notes ==
=== Citations ===
Menelik II House of Solomon Born: 17 August 1844 Died: 12 December 1913
Regnal titles
Preceded by Yohannes IV	Emperor of Ethiopia; 1889–1913 with Taytu Betul (1906–1913)	Succeeded by Iyasu V
Preceded by Haile Melekot	King of Shewa; 1855–1856	Succeeded by Haile Mikael
Preceded by Bezabeh	King of Shewa; 1865–1889	Joined to Ethiopian crown
