= Mathewos =

Mathewos may refer to:

- Million Mathewos, Ethiopian politician
- Mathewos Samson, American politician
