= Guglielmo Massaia =

Italian Catholic cardinal and missionary

His Eminence Guglielmo Massaia Venerable
- Cardinal-Priest of Ss. Vitale, Gervasio e Protasio
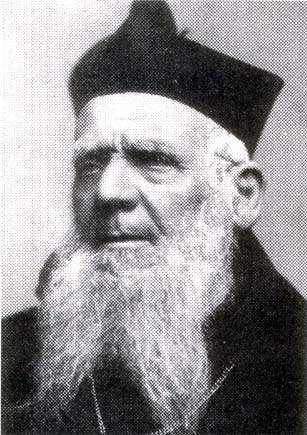
- Church: Roman Catholic Church
- Appointed: 13 November 1884
- Term ended: 6 August 1889
- Predecessor: Antoine-Pierre IX Hassun
- Successor: Albin Dunajewski
- Previous posts: Apostolic Prefect of Aden (1846-1854); Apostolic Vicar of Galla (1846-1880); Titular Bishop of Casium (1846-1881); Titular Archbishop of Stauropolis (1881-1884)

Orders
- Ordination: 16 June 1832
- Consecration: 24 May 1846 by Giacomo Filippo Fransoni
- Created cardinal: 10 November 1884 by Pope Leo XIII
- Rank: Cardinal-Priest

Personal details
- Born: Lorenzo Antonio Massaia; 9 June 1809 Piovà, Marengo, French Empire
- Died: 6 August 1889 (aged 80) San Giorgio a Cremano, Campania, Kingdom of Italy

Sainthood
- Venerated in: Roman Catholic Church
- Title as Saint: Venerable
- Attributes: Franciscan habit

Styles of Guglielmo Massaia
- Reference style: His Eminence
- Spoken style: Your Eminence
- Religious style: Cardinal
- Informal style: Cardinal
- See: none

Guglielmo Massaia, OFM Cap. (born Lorenzo; 9 June 1809 - 6 August 1889) was an Italian cardinal of the Catholic Church who served as a missionary and a Capuchin friar.

Pope Francis named him Venerable on 1 December 2016.

== Life ==
Guglielmo Massaia was born on 9 June 1809 in Piedmont as Lorenzo Antonio Massaia.

He was first educated at the Collegio Reale at Asti under the care of his elder brother Guglielmo who served as a canon and precentor of Asti Cathedral. On the death of his brother he passed as a student to the diocesan seminary in 1824; but at the age of sixteen entered the Capuchin Franciscan Order, receiving the habit on 25 September 1825. He completed his studies at the seminary in 1826. He took the name "Guglielmo" around this time.

Massaia was ordained to the priesthood on 16 June 1832 in Vercelli and served as a spiritual director at a hospital in Turin from 1834 to 1836. He served also as the confessor and advisor of Giuseppe Benedetto Cottolengo - future saint.

He was appointed as a lector of theology; but even whilst teaching he acquired some fame as a preacher and was chosen confessor to Prince Victor Emmanuel, afterwards King of Italy, and Ferdinand, Duke of Genoa. The royal family of Piedmont would have nominated him on several occasions to an episcopal see, but he wanted to join the foreign missions of his order.

He obtained his wish in 1846. That year the Congregation of Propaganda, at the instance of the traveller Antoine d'Abbadie, determined to establish the Apostolic Vicariate of Galla for the Oromo in Ethiopia. The mission was confided to the Capuchins, and Massaia was appointed as the first vicar-apostolic. He received episcopal consecration in Rome on 24 May of that year in the church of San Carlo al Corso.

On his arrival in Ethiopia in 1856, he found the country in a state of religious agitation. The titular head of the Ethiopian Orthodox Church, Abuna Qerellos III, had been dead for about 20 years and there was a movement amongst the native Christians towards union with Rome. Massaia, who had received plenary faculties from Pope Pius IX, ordained a number of native priests for the Coptic Rite; he also obtained the appointment by the Holy See of a vicar-apostolic for the Copts, and himself consecrated the missionary Justin de Jacobis to this office. But this act aroused the enmity of the Coptic Patriarch of Alexandria, who sent a bishop of his own, Abuna Salama III, to Ethiopia.

As a result of the ensuing political agitation, Massaia was banished from the country and had to flee under an assumed name. In 1850 he visited Europe to gain a fresh band of missionaries and means to develop his work: he had interviews with the French Minister of Foreign Affairs in Paris, and with Lord Palmerston in London. On his return to the Oromos, he founded a large number of missions; he also established a school at Marseille for the education of Oromo boys freed from slavery; besides this, he composed a grammar of the Oromo language which was published at Marseilles in 1867.

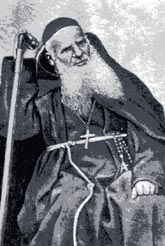
Massaia.

=== Menelik's advisor ===
Massaia would find himself reunited with Menelik after ten years, now a king in his hereditary Shewa. (Note: Massaia first met Menelik II in 1858, a boy still, and a political prisoner of Emperor Tewodros II. The Emperor summoned Massaia for questioning.) However, the two men would meet again under strange circumstances. Massaia came during the British expedition to Abyssinia, and was to deliver a letter from the British vice-consul to Menelik; with the demand that Menelik should refuse asylum in the event Tewodros escaped to Shewa. Massaia would remain at Menelik court as counsellor, for the next decade, with invaluable contributions to Menelik's diplomatic endeavours to Europeans.

In 1877, father Massaia was instrumental in the reconciliation between Menelik II and Masasha Sayfu, Menelik's first cousin. This intervention helped abort an attempted coup, and paved the way for the exile of the sly conspirator, Bafena, Menelik's ex-consort.

=== Return to Europe ===
During his thirty-five years as a missionary he was exiled seven times, but he always returned. However, in 1880 he was compelled by ill health to resign his mission. In recognition of his merit, Pope Leo XIII raised him to the titular Archbishopric of Stauropolis. Leo XIII also raised him into the cardinalate in 1884 as the Cardinal-Priest of Ss. Vitale, Gervasio e Protasio.

At the command of the pope, he wrote an account of his missionary labours, under the title, "I miei trentacinque anni di missione nell' alta Etiopia", the first volume of which was published simultaneously at Rome and Milan in 1883, and the last in 1895. In this work, he deals not only with the progress of the mission, but with the political and economic conditions of Ethiopia as he knew them.

He lived his last decade at a Capuchin friary in Frascati and died on 6 August 1889 at 4:30am of cardio-circulatory collapse. His remains were buried in Frascati after the funeral on 10 August 1889, celebrated by Ignazio Perrsico, the Titular Archbishop of Damiata.

== Legacy ==
In 1940 his native village of Piovà was renamed Piovà Massaia in his honour. In 1952, Italy issued a commemorative stamp celebrating his mission to Ethiopia. Many streets and buildings in Italy are named after Guglielmo Massaia, for example, the Via Cardinale Guglielmo Massaia in Rome and Turin or the Museo Etiopico Guglielmo Massaia in Frascati (Rome).

He was the subject of the 1939 biopic Cardinal Messias directed by Goffredo Alessandrini and starring Camillo Pilotto as Massaia. It was awarded the Mussolini Cup at the 1939 Venice Film Festival.

== Cause for beatification ==
The process for beatification had its origins as far back as 1914 when documents were collected in a diocesan process. The cause was formally opened on 5 December 1941, granting Massaia the title of Servant of God.

The Positio was submitted to the Congregation for the Causes of Saints in 2014 while historians voiced their approval of the cause in a vote undertaken on 21 October 2014. Pope Francis titled him as Venerable on 1 December 2016 upon the confirmation of his life of heroic virtue.
