= Meirav (disambiguation) =

Merav, Meirav (Hebrew: מירב) may refer to:

- Meirav, a kibbutz in Northern Israel
- An alternative spelling for Merab, daughter of Saul

== People ==
- Meirav Ben-Ari (born 1975), Israeli politician
- Merav Ben-David (born 1959), Israeli-American ecologist, zoologist, and politician
- Meirav Cohen (born 1983), Israeli politician
- Merav Doster (born 1976), Israeli female screenwriter
- Merav Michaeli (born 1966), Israeli journalist and politician
- Merav Opher, Israeli astronomer
- Meirav Shamir (born 1988), Israeli-American soccer player
