= Bezabeh =

Bezabeh is a surname. Notable people with the surname include:

- Alemayehu Bezabeh (born c. 1986), Ethiopian athlete
- Atre Bezabeh (born 1954), Ethiopian sprinter
- Sisay Bezabeh (born 1977), Ethiopian-born Australian athlete
- Tegegne Bezabeh (born 1941), Ethiopian sprinter
