= Paul Merab =

Paul Merab (real name: Petre Merabishvili, Georgian: პეტრე მერაბიშვილი; September 22, 1876, in Ude, Georgia – November 13, 1930, in Paris) was a Georgian medical doctor, pharmacist and researcher of Ethiopia.

Merab was born in a Georgian Roman Catholic community, now Samtskhe-Javakheti region in south Georgia. A Sorbonne graduate, Merab was hired in Istanbul to work as a physician for the Ethiopian Emperor Menilek II for several years. He lived in Ethiopia from 1908 to 1929, except for the years of the First World War when he volunteered in the French military. In 1910, he founded the first pharmacy in Addis Ababa which he called "Pharmacie de la Géorgie". In 1929, he finally resettled to France, where he published his informative researches and memories of Ethiopia.
