= Liche =

Former settlement in Ethiopia

Liche, also spelled Liché and Litché, was a settlement in Ethiopia in the late 19th and early 20th century. It was a major market town in Shoa and briefly served as that kingdom's capital. The future emperor Menelek was forced to move his court to Debra Bernam (modern Debre Berhan) in 1878 as part of his treaty with Yohannes IV.
