= Haile Selassie =

Emperor of Ethiopia from 1930 to 1974

Haile Selassie I
- Negusa Nagast
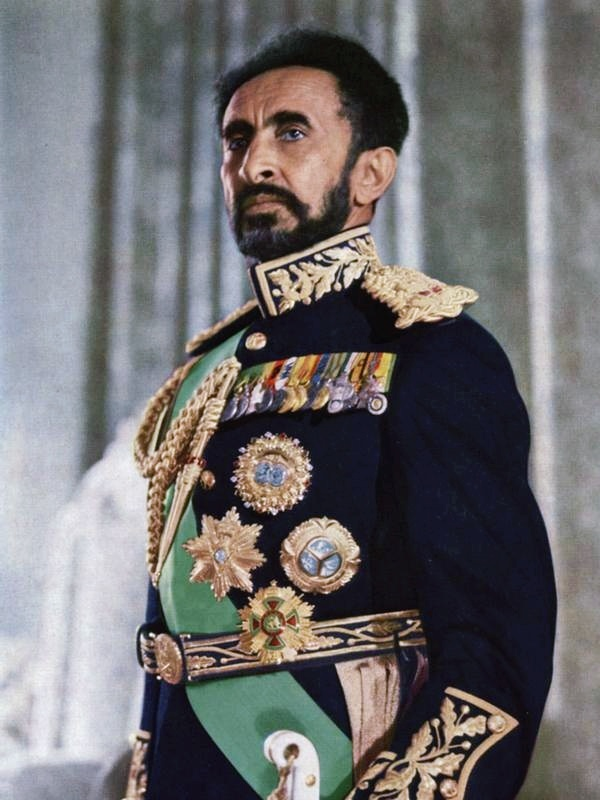
- Selassie in 1970

Emperor of Ethiopia
- Reign: 2 April 1930 – 12 September 1974 (Note: In exile from 2 May 1936 – 20 January 1941)
- Coronation: 2 November 1930
- Predecessor: Zewditu
- Successor: Amha Selassie as King of Ethiopia (designated by the Derg and unacknowledged) Aman Andom as Chairman of the Derg (head of state of Ethiopia)
- Prime Minister: See list: Himself; Wolde Tzaddick; Makonnen Endelkachew; Abebe Aregai; Imru Haile Selassie; Aklilu Habte-Wold; Endelkachew Makonnen; Mikael Imru

Regent of Ethiopia
- Regency: 27 September 1916 – 2 April 1930
- Predecessor: Tessema Nadew
- Monarch: Zewditu
- Born: Lij Tafari Makonnen; 23 July 1892; Ejersa Goro, Hararghe, Ethiopia
- Died: 27 August 1975 (aged 83); Jubilee Palace, Addis Ababa, Ethiopia
- Cause of death: Murder by strangulation (Committed by Derg)
- Burial: 5 November 2000; Holy Trinity Cathedral, Addis Ababa, Ethiopia
- Spouse: Woizero Altayech; Menen Asfaw (m. 1911; died 1962)
- Issue Detail: Princess Romanework; Princess Tenagnework; Crown Prince Asfaw Wossen; Princess Zenebework; Princess Tsehai; Prince Makonnen; Prince Sahle Selassie
Regnal name
- ቀዳማዊ ኀይለ ሥላሴ (Qädamawi Haylä Səllasé)
- House: Shewa
- Dynasty: Solomonic dynasty
- Father: Makonnen Wolde Mikael
- Mother: Yeshimebet Ali
- Religion: Ethiopian Orthodox Tewahedo

Chief Minister
- In office 12 December 1926 – 1 May 1936
- Preceded by: Habte Giyorgis Dinagde
- Succeeded by: Wolde Tzaddick

1st and 5th Chairperson of the Organisation of African Unity
- In office 25 May 1963 – 17 July 1964
- Succeeded by: Gamal Abdel Nasser
- In office 5 November 1966 – 11 September 1967
- Preceded by: Joseph Arthur Ankrah
- Succeeded by: Mobutu Sese Seko
- Military career
- Service years: 1930–1974
- Rank: Field Marshal; Admiral of the Fleet; Marshal of the Air
- Commands: Commander-in-chief
- Conflicts: Gugsa Wale's rebellion; Second Italo-Ethiopian War; First Battle of Tembien; Battle of Amba Aradam; Second Battle of Tembien; Battle of Shire; Battle of Maychew; Retreat to Lake Ashenge; World War II; East African campaign; Korean War; 1964 Ethiopian–Somali Border War
- Haile Selassie I's voice Speech to the Ethiopian Parliament following the occasion of a new Constitution; Recorded 4 November 1955

Haile Selassie I (Note: IPA: /ˈhaɪli səˈlæsi/ HY-lee sə-LASS-ee; Ge'ez: ቀዳማዊ ኀይለ ሥላሴ, romanized: Qädamawi Ḫäylä Śəllase, Amharic pronunciation: [kʼədäˈmäwi ˈhäjlə sɨlˈläse], lit. 'Power of the Trinity';) (born Tafari Makonnen (Note: Ge'ez: ልጅ ተፈሪ መኮንን, romanized: Täfäri Mäkonnän) or Lij Tafari; 23 July 1892 – 27 August 1975) was Emperor of Ethiopia from 1930 to 1974. He rose to power as the Regent Plenipotentiary of Ethiopia (Enderase) under Empress Zewditu between 1916 and 1930.

Widely considered to be a defining figure in modern Ethiopian history, he is accorded divine importance in Rastafari, an Abrahamic religion that emerged in the 1930s. A few years before he began his reign over the Ethiopian Empire, Selassie defeated Ethiopian army commander Ras Gugsa Welle Bitul, nephew of Empress Taytu Betul, at the Battle of Anchem. He belonged to the Solomonic dynasty, founded by Emperor Yekuno Amlak in 1270.

Selassie, seeking to modernise Ethiopia, introduced political and social reforms including the 1931 constitution and the abolition of slavery in 1942. He led the empire during the Second Italo-Ethiopian War, and after its defeat was exiled to the United Kingdom. When the Italian occupation of East Africa began, he traveled to Anglo-Egyptian Sudan to coordinate the Ethiopian struggle against Fascist Italy; he returned home after the East African campaign of World War II. He dissolved the Federation of Ethiopia and Eritrea, established by the United Nations General Assembly in 1950, and annexed Eritrea as one of Ethiopia's provinces, while also fighting to prevent Eritrean secession. As an internationalist, Selassie led Ethiopia's accession to the United Nations. In 1963, he presided over the formation of the Organisation of African Unity, the precursor of the African Union, and served as its first chairman. By the early 1960s, prominent African socialists such as Kwame Nkrumah envisioned the creation of a "United States of Africa". Their rhetoric was anti-Western; Selassie saw this as a threat to his alliances. He attempted to influence a more moderate posture within the group. (Note: "Although our position vis-a-vis the power-blocs is identified with the policy of non-alignment, our past history testifies to the fact that we have always endeavoured to co-operate with all nations. without exception. Thus, one of the fundamental principles we agreed upon at the Addis Abada Summit Conference [of Independent African States] gives expression to our fundamental desire to live in harmony and co-operation with all States.")

Amidst popular uprisings, Selassie was overthrown by the Derg, a military junta, in the 1974 coup d'état. With support from the Soviet Union, the Derg began governing Ethiopia as a Marxist–Leninist state. In 1994, three years after the fall of the Derg regime, it was revealed to the public that the Derg had assassinated Selassie at the Jubilee Palace in Addis Ababa on 27 August 1975. On 5 November 2000, his excavated remains were buried at the Holy Trinity Cathedral of Addis Ababa.

Among adherents of Rastafari, Selassie is called the returned Jesus, although he was an adherent of the Ethiopian Orthodox Church himself. He has been criticised for his suppression of rebellions among the landed aristocracy (Mesafint), which consistently opposed his changes. Others have criticised Ethiopia's failure to modernise rapidly enough. His administration has been criticised as autocratic and illiberal by groups such as Human Rights Watch. During his reign, the Harari people were persecuted and many left their homes. According to some sources, late into Selassie's administration, the Oromo language was de facto banned from education, public speaking and use in administration, though there was never a law that criminalised any language. His government relocated many Amhara people into southern Ethiopia. In recent years, there has been a major resurgence in defense of and nostalgia for Selassie’s reign over the Ethiopian Empire, and even outright support of constitutional monarchism.

== Name ==
Haile Selassie was known as a child as Lij Tafari Makonnen (Amharic: ልጅ ተፈሪ መኮንን, romanized: Ləj Täfäri Mäkonnən). Lij is translated as "child" and serves to indicate that a youth is of noble blood. His given name Tafari means "one who is respected or feared". Like most Ethiopians, his personal name "Tafari" is followed by that of his father Makonnen and that of his grandfather Woldemikael. His name Haile Selassie was given to him at his infant baptism and adopted again as part of his regnal name in 1930.

On 1 November 1905, at the age of 13, Tafari was appointed by his father as the Dejazmatch of Gara Mulatta (a region some 20 miles southwest of Harar). The literal translation of Dejazmatch is "keeper of the door"; it is a title of nobility equivalent to a count. On 27 September 1916, he was proclaimed Crown Prince and heir apparent to the throne (Alga Worrach), and appointed Regent Plenipotentiary (Balemulu Silt'an Enderase). On 11 February 1917, he was crowned Le'ul-Ras and became known as Ras Tafari Makonnen. Ras is translated as "head" and is a rank of nobility equivalent to a duke, though it is often rendered in translation as "prince". Originally the title Le'ul, which means "Your Highness", was only ever used as a form of address; however, in 1916 the title Le'ul-Ras replaced the senior office of Ras Bitwoded and so became the equivalent of a royal duke. In 1928, Empress Zewditu planned on granting him the throne of Shewa; however, at the last moment opposition from certain provincial rulers caused a change and his title Negus or "King" was conferred without geographical qualification or definition.

On 2 November 1930, after the death of Empress Zewditu, Tafari was crowned Negusa Nagast, literally "King of Kings", rendered in English as "Emperor". Upon his ascension, he took as his regnal name Haile Selassie I. Haile means in Ge'ez "Power of" and Selassie means trinity – therefore Haile Selassie roughly translates to "Power of the Trinity". Selassie's full title in office was "By the Conquering Lion of the Tribe of Judah, His Imperial Majesty Haile Selassie I, King of Kings of Ethiopia, Lord of Lords, Elect of God". (Note: Ge'ez ግርማዊ ቀዳማዊ አፄ ኃይለ ሥላሴ ሞዓ አንበሳ ዘእምነገደ ይሁዳ ንጉሠ ነገሥት ዘኢትዮጵያ ሰዩመ እግዚአብሔር; girmāwī ḳedāmāwī 'aṣē ḫayle śillāsē, mō'ā 'anbessā ze'imneggede yihudā niguse negest ze'ītyōṗṗyā, siyume 'igzī'a'bihēr.) This title reflects Ethiopian dynastic traditions, which hold that all monarchs must trace their lineage to Menelik I, who is described by the Kebra Nagast (a 14th-century CE national epic) as the son of the tenth-century BCE King Solomon and the Queen of Sheba.

To Ethiopians, Selassie has been known by many names, including Janhoy ("His Majesty") Talaqu Meri ("Great Leader") and Abba Tekel ("Father of Tekel", his horse name). Rastafari employs many of these appellations, also referring to him as Jah, Jah Jah, Jah Rastafari, and HIM (the abbreviation of "His Imperial Majesty").

== Early life ==
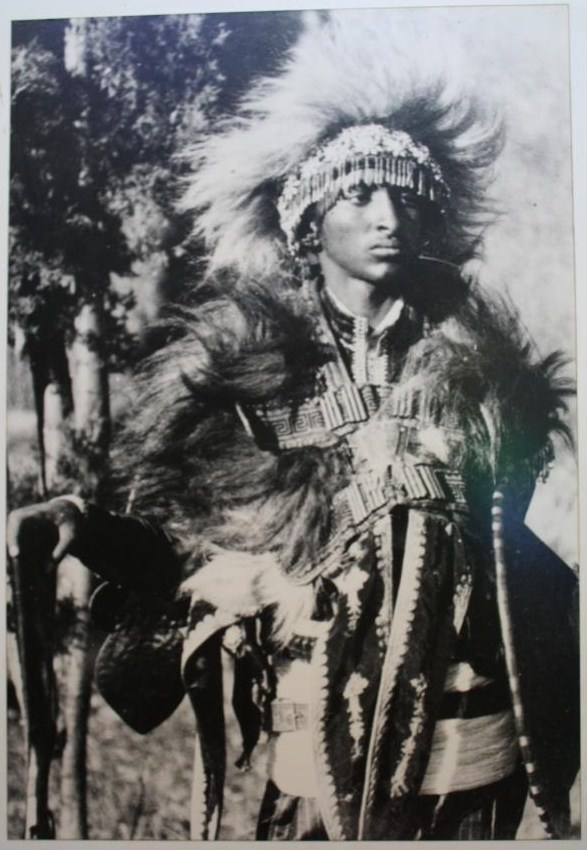
Then Tafari Makonnen wearing a warrior's dress

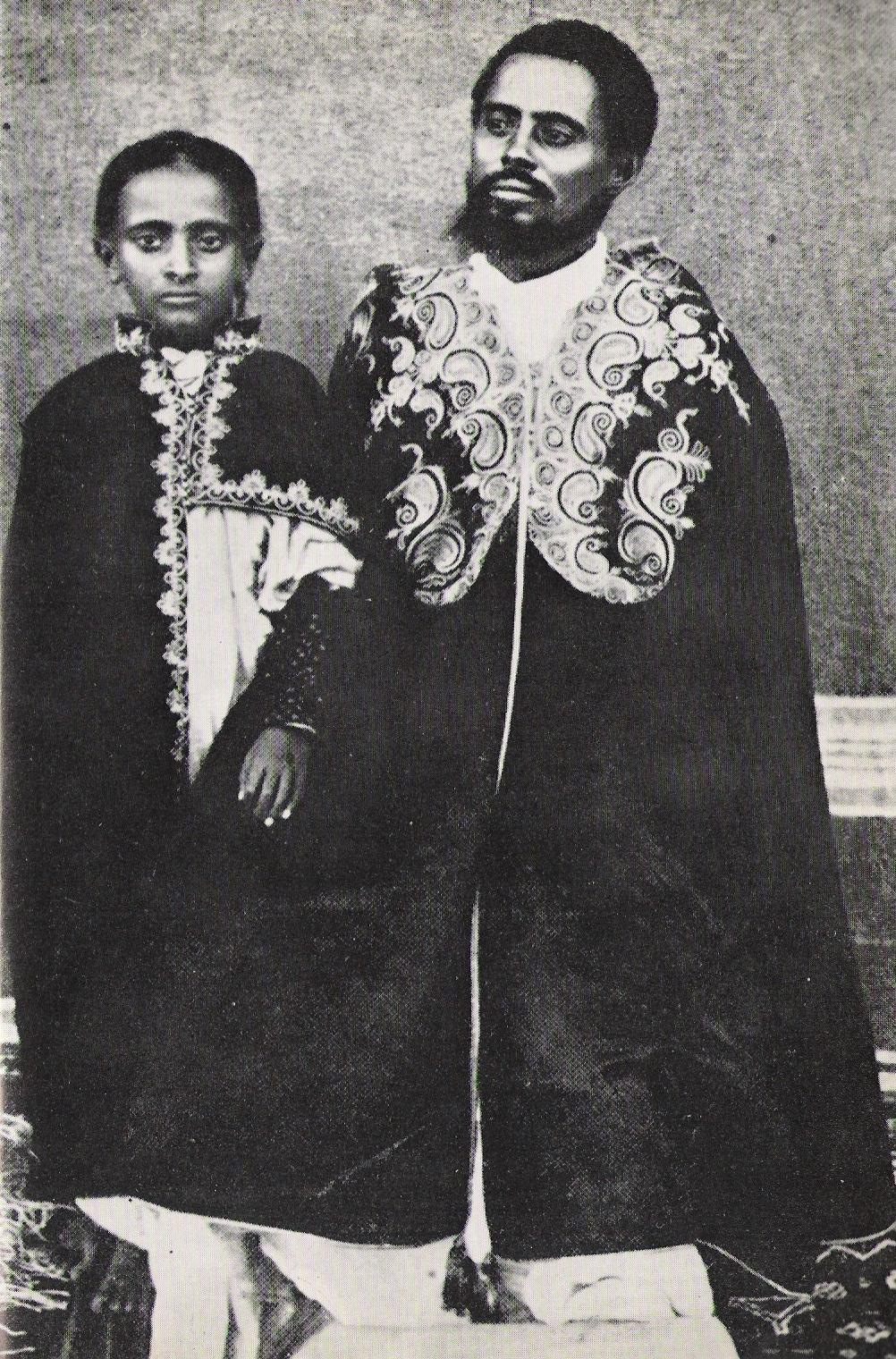
Ras Makonnen Woldemikael and his son Lij Tafari Makonnen

Tafari's royal line (through his paternal grandmother) descended from the Shewan Amhara Solomonic king, Sahle Selassie. He was born on 23 July 1892, in the village of Ejersa Goro, in the Hararghe province of Ethiopia. Tafari's mother, Woizero ("Lady") Yeshimebet Ali Abba Jifar, was paternally of Oromo descent and maternally of Silte heritage, while his father, Ras Makonnen Wolde Mikael, was maternally of Amhara descent but his paternal lineage remains disputed with some stating Amharan origins while others claim Oromo. Tafari's paternal grandfather belonged to a noble family from Shewa and was the hereditary ruler of the districts of Menz and Doba, which are located in the Amhara Region. The district of Menz, from.which the Haile Selassie's paternal Grandfather originated from, is a thoroughly Amharan area often referred to as "the source of the Amhara". Tafari's mother was the daughter of a ruling chief from Were Ilu in Wollo province, Dejazmach Ali Abba Jifar.

Ras Makonnen was the grandson of King Sahle Selassie who was once the ruler of Shewa. He served as a general in the First Italo–Ethiopian War, playing a key role at the Battle of Adwa; Selassie was thus able to ascend to the imperial throne through his paternal grandmother, Woizero Tenagnework Sahle Selassie, who was an aunt of Emperor Menelik II and daughter of the Solomonic Amhara King of Shewa, Negus Sahle Selassie. As such, Selassie claimed direct descent from Makeda, the Queen of Sheba, and King Solomon of ancient Israel.

Ras Makonnen arranged for Tafari as well as his first cousin, Imru Haile Selassie, to receive instruction in Harar from Abba Samuel Wolde Kahin, an Ethiopian Capuchin friar, and from Dr. Vitalien, a surgeon from Guadeloupe. Tafari was named Dejazmach (literally "commander of the gate", roughly equivalent to "count") at the age of 13, on 1 November 1905. Shortly thereafter, his father Makonnen died at Kulibi, in 1906.

=== Governorship ===
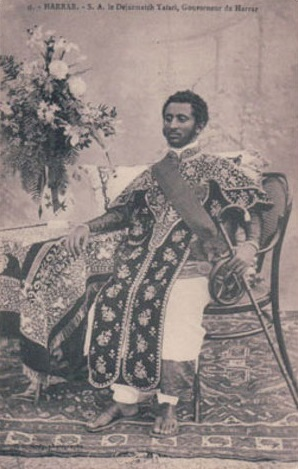
Dejazmatch Tafari, as governor of Harar

Tafari assumed the titular governorship of Selale in 1906, a realm of marginal importance, but one that enabled him to continue his studies. In 1907, he was appointed governor over part of the province of Sidamo. It is alleged that during his late teens, Selassie was married to Woizero Altayech, and that from this union, his daughter Princess Romanework was born.

Following the death of his brother Yelma in 1907, the governorate of Harar was left vacant, and its administration was left to Menelik's loyal general, Dejazmach Balcha Safo. Balcha Safo's administration of Harar was ineffective, and so during the last illness of Menelik II, and the brief reign of Empress Taytu Betul, Tafari was made governor of Harar in 1910 or 1911.

=== Marriage ===
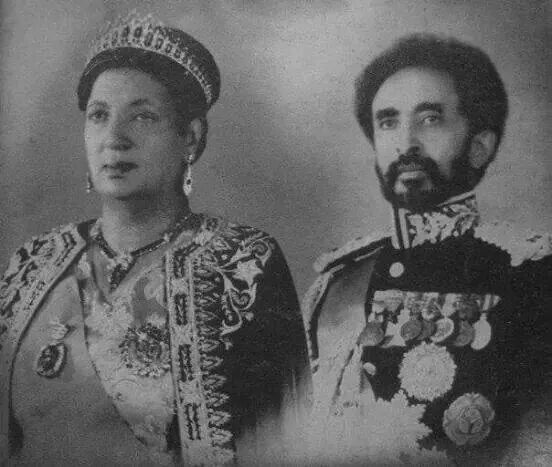
Together with his wife, Empress Menen Asfaw, 1955

On 3 August 1911, Tafari married Menen Asfaw of Ambassel, niece of the heir to the throne Lij Iyasu. Menen Asfaw was 22 years old while Tafari was 19 years of age. Menen had already married two previous noblemen, while Tafari had one previous wife and one child. The marriage between Menen Asfaw and Selassie lasted for 50 years. Although possibly a political match designed to create peace between Ethiopian nobles, the couple's family had said they married with mutual consent. Selassie described his spouse as a "woman without any malice whatsoever".

== Regency ==
The extent to which Tafari Makonnen contributed to the movement that would come to depose Lij Iyasu has been discussed extensively, particularly in Selassie's own detailed account of the matter. Iyasu was the designated but uncrowned emperor of Ethiopia from 1913 to 1916. Iyasu's reputation for scandalous behavior and a disrespectful attitude towards the nobles at the court of his grandfather, Menelik II, damaged his reputation. Iyasu's flirtation with Islam was considered treasonous among the Ethiopian Orthodox Christian leadership of the empire. On 27 September 1916, Iyasu was deposed.

Contributing to the movement that deposed Iyasu were conservatives such as Fitawrari Habte Giyorgis, Menelik II's longtime Minister of War. The movement to depose Iyasu preferred Tafari, as he attracted support from both progressive and conservative factions. Ultimately, Iyasu was deposed on the grounds of conversion to Islam. In his place, the daughter of Menelik II (the aunt of Iyasu) was named Empress Zewditu, while Tafari was elevated to the rank of Ras and was made heir apparent and Crown Prince. In the power arrangement that followed, Tafari accepted the role of Regent Plenipotentiary (Balemulu 'Inderase) (Note: Bālemulu literally means "fully empowered" or "wholly authorised", thus distinguishing it from the general use of Enderase, that being a representative or lieutenant of the Emperor to fiefs or vassals, essentially a Governor-General or Viceroy, by which term provincial governors in the contemporary Imperial period, during Haile Selassie's reign, were referred.) and became the de facto ruler of the Ethiopian Empire (Mangista Ityop'p'ya). Zewditu would govern while Tafari would administer.

While Iyasu had been deposed on 27 September 1916, on 8 October he managed to escape into the Ogaden Desert and his father, Negus Mikael of Wollo, had time to come to his aid. On 27 October, Negus Mikael and his army met an army under Fitawrari Habte Giyorgis loyal to Zewditu and Tafari. During the Battle of Segale, Mikael was defeated and captured. Any chance that Iyasu would regain the throne was ended, and he went into hiding. On 11 January 1921, after avoiding capture for about five years, Iyasu was taken into custody by Gugsa Araya Selassie.

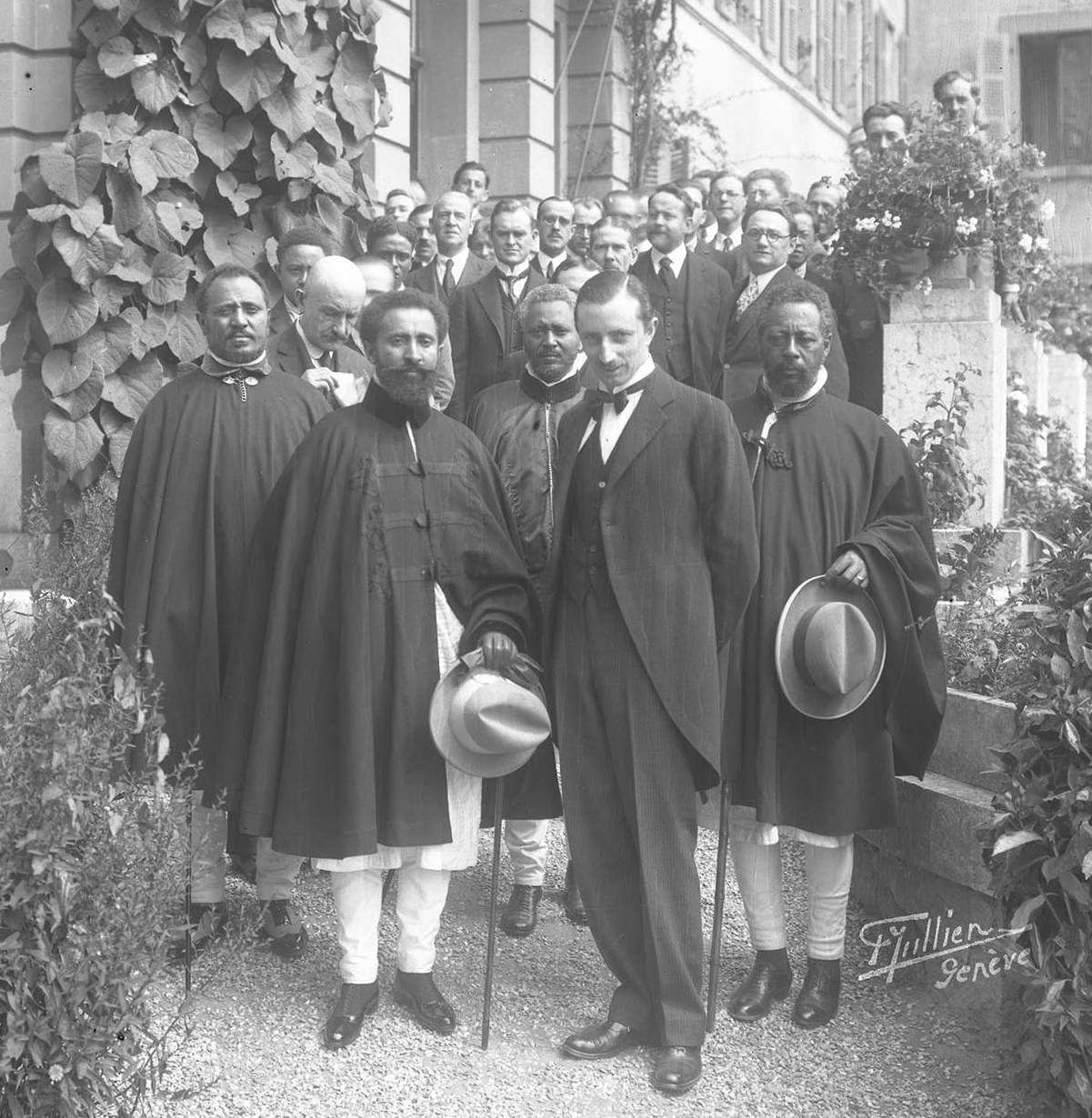
Ras Tafari in 1924 at the International Labour Organization

On 11 February 1917, the coronation for Zewditu took place. She pledged to rule justly through her regent, Tafari. While Tafari was the more visible of the two, Zewditu was not simply an honorary ruler, but her position was complicated, compared to other Ethiopian monarchs, requiring her to arbitrate the claims of competing factions. In other words, she had the last word. Unlike other monarchs, Tafari carried the burden of daily administration. Despite this, at first his position was relatively weak. His personal army was poorly equipped, his finances were limited, and he had little leverage to withstand the combined influence of the Empress, the Minister of War, or the provincial governors. Nonetheless, Zewditu's authority gradually weakened while Tafari's power increased. She focused on more praying and fasting and much less in her official duties, which allowed Tafari to later have greater influence than even the Empress.

During his Regency, the new Crown Prince developed the policy of cautious modernisation initiated by Menelik II. Also, during this time, he survived the 1918 flu pandemic, having come down with the illness as someone fairly "prone to" the effects of disease throughout his life. He secured Ethiopia's admission to the League of Nations in 1923 by promising to eradicate slavery; each emperor since Tewodros II had issued proclamations to halt slavery, but without effect: the internationally scorned practice persisted well into Selassie's reign with an estimated 2 million slaves in Ethiopia in the early 1930s.

=== Travel abroad ===
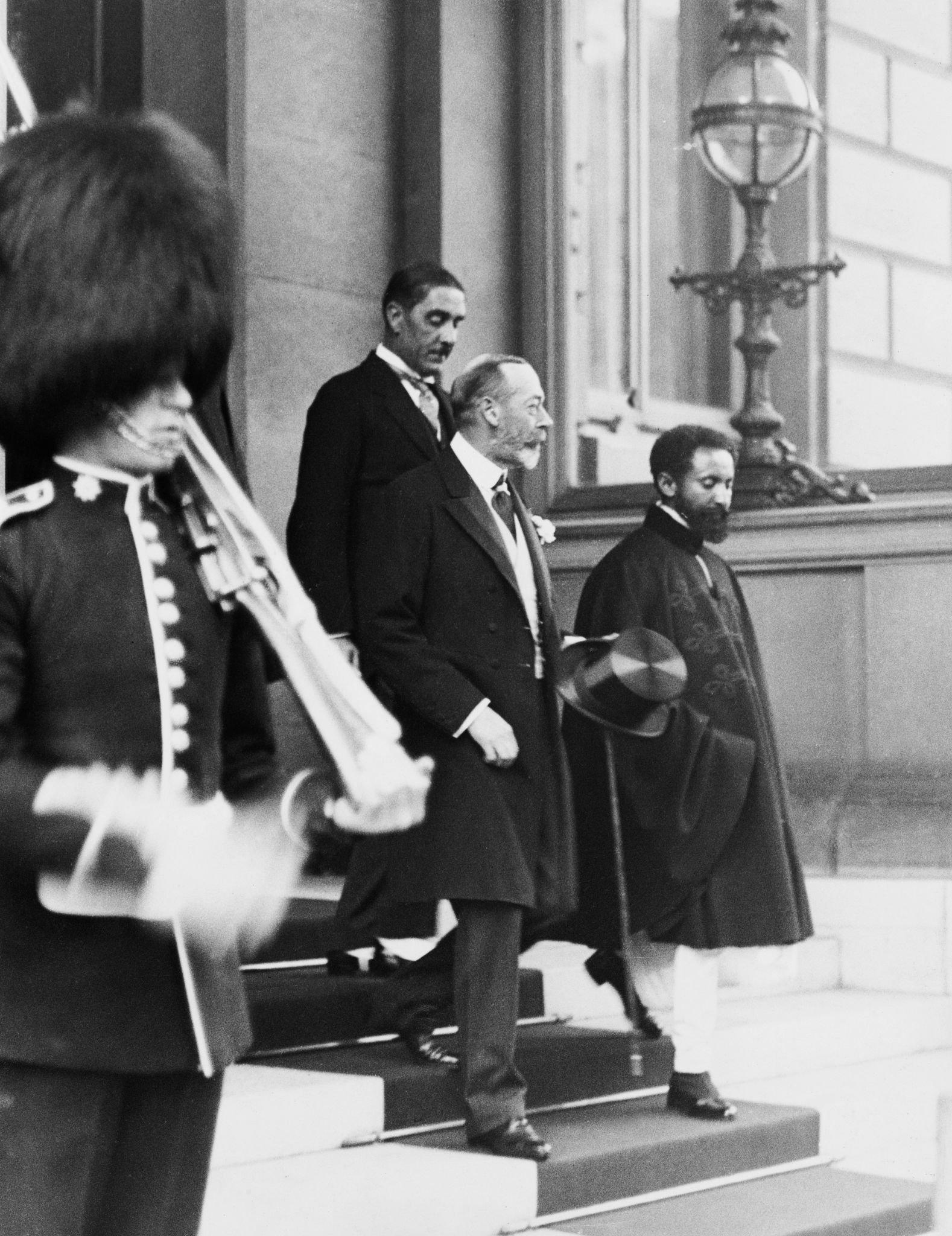
With King George V at Buckingham Palace, 1924

In 1924, Ras Tafari toured Europe and the Middle East visiting Jerusalem, Alexandria, Paris, Luxembourg, Brussels, Amsterdam, Stockholm, London, Geneva, Gibraltar and Athens. With him on his tour was a group that included Ras Seyum Mangasha of western Tigray Province; Ras Hailu Tekle Haymanot of Gojjam province; Ras Mulugeta Yeggazu of Illubabor Province; Ras Makonnen Endelkachew; and Blattengeta Heruy Welde Selassie. The primary goal of the trip to Europe was for Ethiopia to gain access to the sea. In Paris, Tafari was to find out from the French Foreign Ministry (Quai d'Orsay) that this goal would not be realised. However, failing this, he and his retinue inspected schools, hospitals, factories, and churches. Although patterning many reforms after European models, Tafari remained wary of European pressure. To guard against economic imperialism, Tafari required that all enterprises have at least partial local ownership. Of his modernisation campaign, he remarked, "We need European progress only because we are surrounded by it. That is at once a benefit and a misfortune."

Throughout Tafari's travels in Europe, the Levant, and Egypt, he and his entourage were greeted with enthusiasm and fascination. Seyum Mangasha accompanied him and Hailu Tekle Haymanot who, like Tafari, were sons of generals who contributed to the victorious war against Italy a quarter-century earlier at the Battle of Adwa. Another member of his entourage, Mulugeta Yeggazu, actually fought at Adwa as a young man. The "Oriental Dignity" of the Ethiopians and their "rich, picturesque court dress" were sensationalised in the media; among his entourage he even included a pride of lions, which he distributed as gifts to President Alexandre Millerand and Prime Minister Raymond Poincaré of France, to King George V of the United Kingdom, and to the Zoological Garden (Jardin Zoologique) of Paris, France. As one historian noted, "Rarely can a tour have inspired so many anecdotes". In return for two lions, the United Kingdom presented Tafari with the imperial crown of Emperor Tewodros II for its safe return to Empress Zewditu. The crown had been taken by General Sir Robert Napier during the 1868 Expedition to Abyssinia.

In this period, the Crown Prince visited the Armenian monastery of Jerusalem. There, he adopted 40 Armenian orphans (አርባ ልጆች Arba Lijoch, "forty children"), who had lost their parents during the Armenian Genocide. Tafari arranged for the musical education of the youths, and they came to form the imperial brass band.

== Reign ==
=== King and Emperor ===
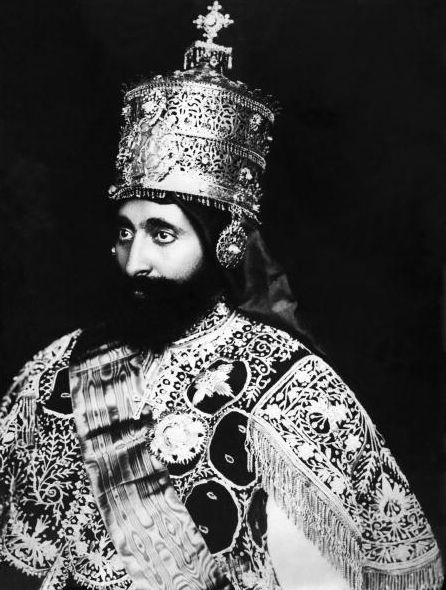
Coronation as Emperor on 2 November 1930

Tafari's authority was challenged in 1928 when Dejazmach Balcha Safo went to Addis Ababa with a sizeable armed force. When Tafari consolidated his hold over the provinces, many of Menelik's appointees refused to abide by the new regulations. Balcha Safo, the governor (Shum) of coffee-rich Sidamo Province, was particularly troublesome. The revenues he remitted to the central government did not reflect the accrued profits, and Tafari recalled him to Addis Ababa. The old man came in high dudgeon and, insultingly, with a large army. (Note: Balcha Safo brought an army of ten thousand with him from Sidamo.) The Dejazmatch paid homage to Empress Zewditu, but snubbed Tafari. On 18 February, while Balcha Safo and his personal bodyguard (Note: Balcha Safo's personal bodyguard numbered about five hundred.) were in Addis Ababa, Tafari had Ras Kassa Haile Darge buy off Balcha Safo's army, and arranged to have him replaced as Shum of Sidamo Province by Birru Wolde Gabriel – who himself was replaced by Desta Damtew.

Even so, the gesture of Balcha Safo empowered Empress Zewditu politically and she attempted to have Tafari tried for treason. He was tried for his benevolent dealings with Italy including a 20-year peace accord that was signed on 2 August. In September, a group of palace reactionaries including some courtiers of the Empress made a final bid to get rid of Tafari. The attempted coup d'état was tragic in its origins and comic in its end. When confronted by Tafari and a company of his troops, the ringleaders of the coup took refuge on the palace grounds in Menelik's mausoleum. Tafari and his men surrounded them, only to be surrounded themselves by the personal guard of Zewditu. More of Tafari's khaki-clad soldiers arrived and decided the outcome in his favor with superiority of arms. Popular support, as well as the support of the police, remained with Tafari. Ultimately, the Empress relented, and, on 7 October 1928, she crowned Tafari as Negus (Amharic: "King").

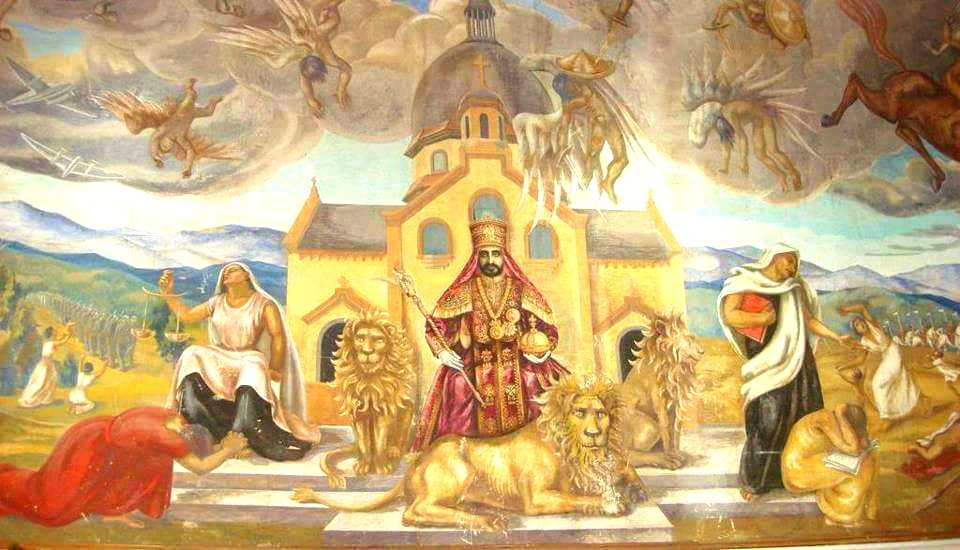
Official coronation painting by Beatrice Playne c. 1950s

The crowning of Tafari as King was controversial. He occupied the same territory as the Empress rather than going off to a regional kingdom of the empire. Two monarchs, even with one being the vassal and the other the emperor (in this case empress), had never ruled from a single location simultaneously in Ethiopian history. Conservatives agitated to redress this perceived insult to the crown's dignity, leading to the Ras Gugsa Welle's rebellion. Gugsa Welle was the husband of the Empress and the Shum of Begemder Province. In early 1930, he raised an army and marched it from his governorate at Gondar towards Addis Ababa. On 31 March 1930, Gugsa Welle was met by forces loyal to Negus Tafari and was defeated at the Battle of Anchem. Gugsa Welle was killed in action. News of Gugsa Welle's defeat and death had hardly spread through Addis Ababa when the Empress died suddenly on 2 April 1930. Although it was long rumored that the Empress was poisoned upon her husband's defeat, or alternately that she died from shock upon hearing of the death of her estranged yet beloved husband, it has since been documented that Zewditu succumbed to paratyphoid fever and complications from diabetes after the Orthodox clergy imposed strict rules concerning her diet during Lent, against her physicians' orders.

Upon Zewditu's death, Tafari himself rose to emperor and was proclaimed Neguse Negest ze-'Ityopp'ya, "King of Kings of Ethiopia". He was crowned on 2 November 1930, at Addis Ababa's Cathedral of St. George. The coronation was by all accounts "a most splendid affair", and it was attended by royals and dignitaries from all over the world. Among those in attendance were the Duke of Gloucester (King George V's son), Marshal Louis Franchet d'Espèrey of France, and the Prince of Udine representing King Victor Emmanuel III of Italy. Special Ambassador Herman Murray Jacoby attended the coronation as the personal representative of U.S. president Herbert Hoover. Emissaries from Egypt, Turkey, Sweden, Belgium, and Japan were there. British author Evelyn Waugh was also present, penning a contemporary report on the event, and American travel lecturer Burton Holmes made the only known film footage of the event. One American newspaper report suggested that the celebration had incurred a cost in excess of $3,000,000. Many of those in attendance received lavish gifts; in one instance the Emperor, a Christian, even sent a gold-encased Bible to an American bishop who had not attended the coronation, but who had dedicated a prayer for the Emperor on the day of the coronation.

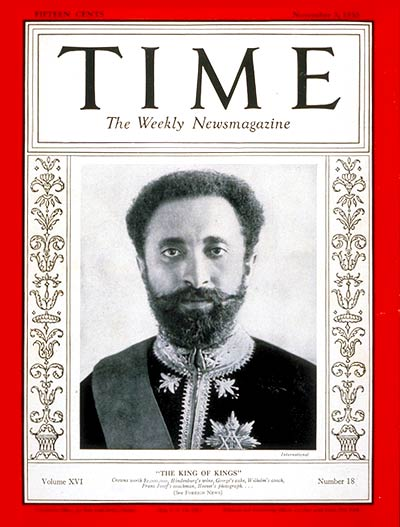
Cover of Time magazine, 3 November 1930

Selassie introduced Ethiopia's first written constitution on 16 July 1931, providing for a bicameral legislature. The constitution kept power in the hands of the nobility, but it did establish democratic standards among the nobility, envisaging a transition to democratic rule: it would prevail "until the people are in a position to elect themselves." The constitution limited succession to the throne to descendants of Selassie, which had the effect of placing other dynastic princes at the time (including the princes of Tigrai, and even the Emperor's loyal cousin Ras Kassa Haile Darge) outside of the line for the throne.

In 1932, the Sultanate of Jimma was formally absorbed into Ethiopia following the death of Sultan Abba Jifar II of Jimma.

Ethiopian Prime ministers of Emperor Haile Selassie I
Year	Prime Minister (Status)
1927	Himself (Royal)
1936	Wolde Tzaddick (Royal)
1942	Ras Betwoded Makonnen Endelkachew (Royal)
1957	Ras Abebe Aregai (Royal)
1960	Leul Ras Imru Haile Selassie(Royal)
1961	Aklilu Habte-Wold (Civilian)
1974	Lij Endelkachew Makonnen (Royal)
1974	Lij Mikael Imru (Royal)
See List of heads of government of Ethiopia

=== Conflict with Italy ===
Ethiopia became the target of renewed Italian imperialist designs in the 1930s. Benito Mussolini's Fascist regime was keen to avenge the military defeats Italy had suffered to Ethiopia in the First Italo-Abyssinian War, and to efface the failed attempt by "liberal" Italy to conquer the country, as epitomised by the defeat at Adwa. A conquest of Ethiopia could also empower the cause of fascism and embolden its empire's rhetoric. Ethiopia would also provide a bridge between Italy's Eritrean and Italian Somaliland possessions. Ethiopia's position in the League of Nations did not dissuade the Italians from invading in 1935; the collective security envisaged by the League proved useless, and a scandal erupted when the Hoare–Laval Pact revealed that Ethiopia's League allies were scheming to appease Italy.

==== Mobilisation ====
Following the Welwel Incident of 5 December 1934, Selassie joined his northern armies and set up headquarters at Desse in Wollo province. He issued a generalized mobilization order on 3 October 1935. On 19 October 1935, he gave more precise orders for his army to his Commander-in-Chief, Ras Kassa, instructing the men to choose hidden positions, to conserve ammunition, and to avoid wearing conspicuous clothing for fear of air attack. Compared to the Ethiopians, the Italians had an advanced, modern military that included a large air force. The Italians also came to employ chemical weapons throughout the conflict, even targeting Red Cross field hospitals.

==== Progress of the war ====
Starting in early October 1935, the Italians invaded Ethiopia. But, by November, the pace of invasion had slowed appreciably, and Selassie's northern armies were able to launch what was known as the "Christmas Offensive". During this offensive, the Italians were forced back in places and put on the defensive. In early 1936, the First Battle of Tembien stopped the progress of the Ethiopian offensive and the Italians were ready to continue their offensive. Following the defeat and destruction of the northern Ethiopian armies at the Battle of Amba Aradam, the Second Battle of Tembien, and the Battle of Shire, Selassie took the field with the last Ethiopian army on the northern front. On 31 March 1936, he launched a counterattack against the Italians himself at the Battle of Maychew in southern Tigray. The Emperor's army was defeated and retreated in disarray. As his army withdrew, the Italians attacked from the air along with rebellious Raya and Azebo tribesmen on the ground, who were armed and paid by the Italians. Many of the Ethiopian military were obsolete compared to the invading Italian forces, being mostly untrained and possessing non-modern rifles and weaponry.

Selassie made a solitary pilgrimage to the churches at Lalibela, at considerable risk of capture, before returning to his capital. After a stormy session of the council of state, it was agreed that because Addis Ababa could not be defended, the government would relocate to the southern town of Gore, and that in the interest of preserving the imperial house, Empress Menen Asfaw and the rest of the imperial family should immediately depart for French Somaliland, and from there continue on to Jerusalem.

==== Exile debate ====
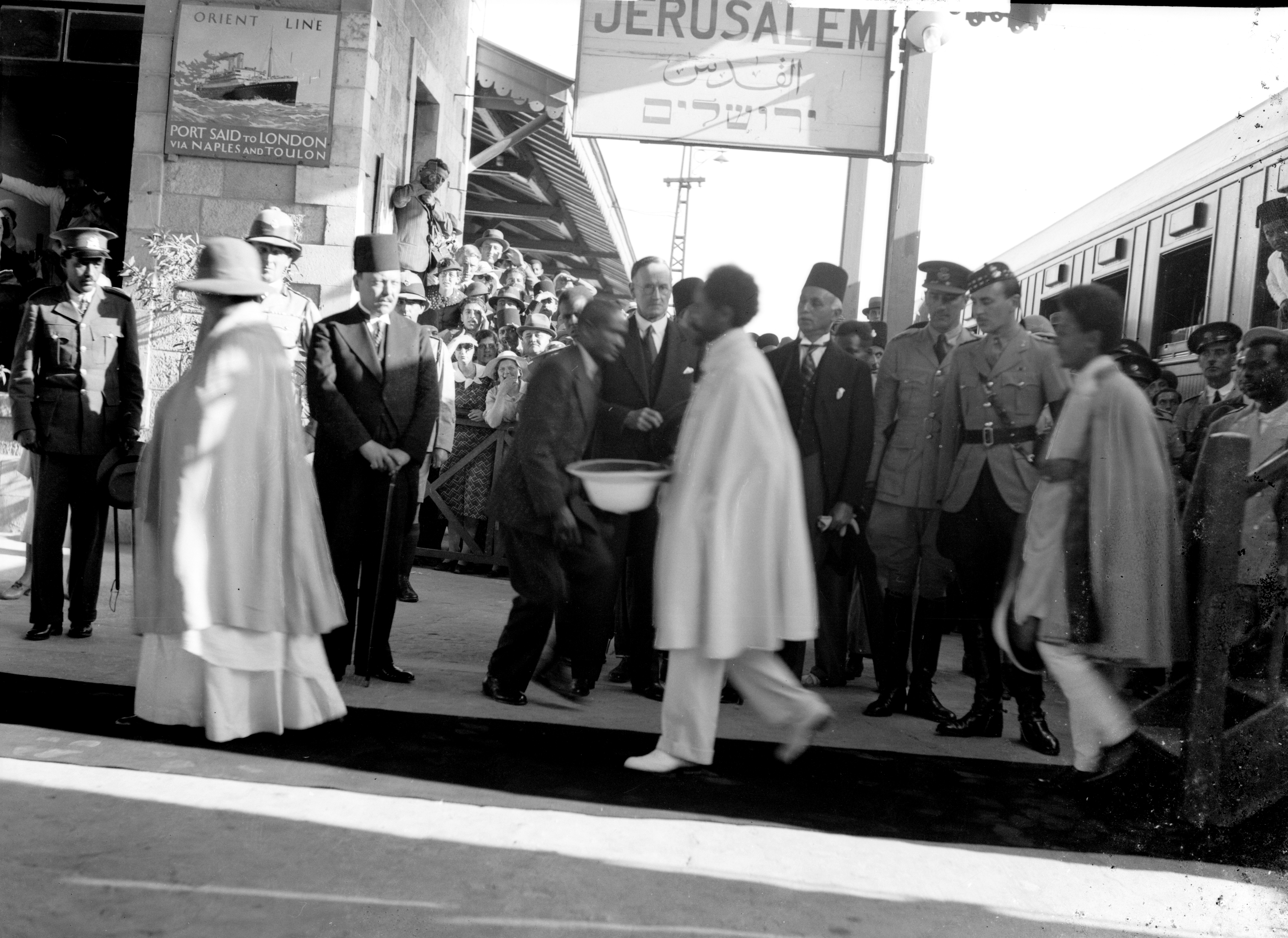
The Emperor arrives in Jerusalem, May 1936.

After further debate as to whether Selassie should go to Gore or accompany his family into exile, it was agreed that he should leave Ethiopia with his family and present the case of Ethiopia to the League of Nations at Geneva. The decision was not unanimous and several participants, including the nobleman Blatta Tekle Wolde Hawariat, strenuously objected to the idea of an Ethiopian monarch fleeing before an invading force. Selassie appointed his cousin Ras Imru Haile Selassie as Prince Regent in his absence, departing with his family for French Somaliland on 2 May 1936.

On 5 May, Marshal Pietro Badoglio led Italian troops into Addis Ababa, and Mussolini declared Ethiopia an Italian province. Victor Emanuel III was proclaimed as the new Emperor of Ethiopia. On the previous day, the Ethiopian exiles had left French Somaliland aboard the British cruiser HMS Enterprise. They were bound for Jerusalem in the British Mandate of Palestine, where the Ethiopian imperial family maintained a residence. The family disembarked at Haifa and then went on to Jerusalem. Once there, Selassie and his retinue prepared to make their case at Geneva. The choice of Jerusalem was highly symbolic, since the Solomonic Dynasty claimed descent from the House of David. Leaving the Holy Land, Selassie and his entourage sailed aboard the British cruiser HMS Capetown for Gibraltar, where he stayed at the Rock Hotel. From Gibraltar, the exiles were transferred to an ordinary liner. By doing this, the United Kingdom government was spared the expense of a state reception.

==== Collective security and the League of Nations, 1936 ====
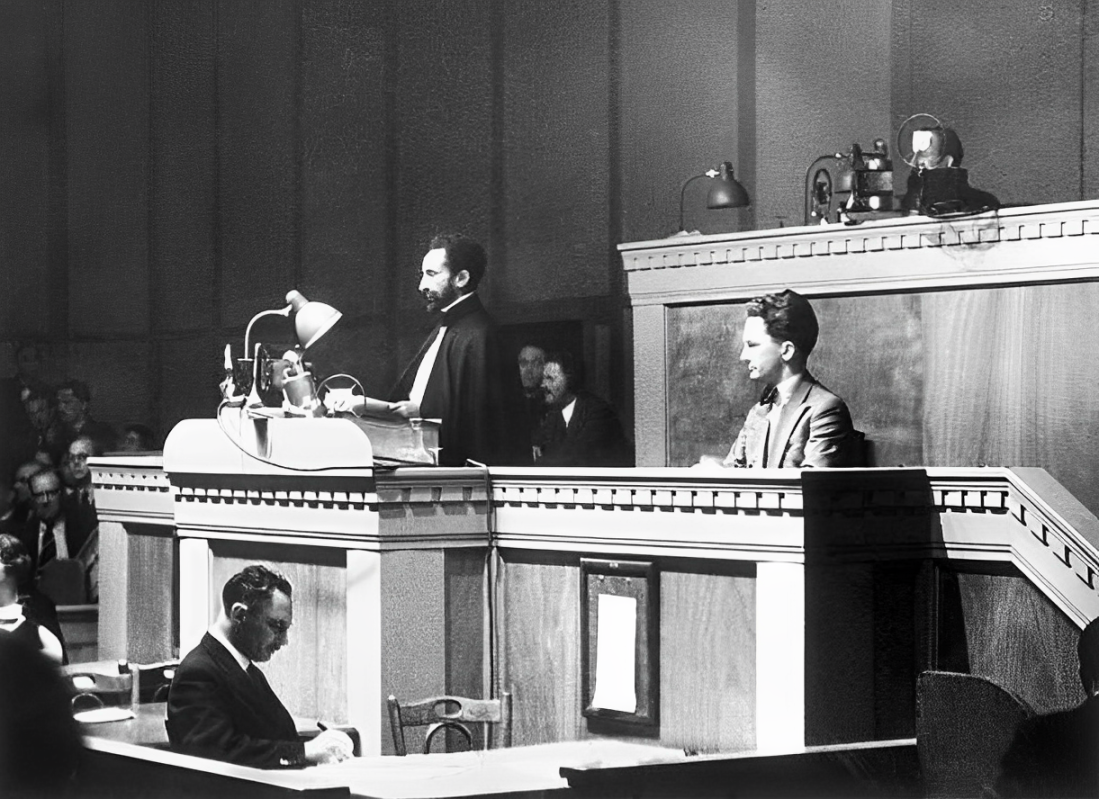
At the League of Nations appealing Italy's invasion in 1936

On 12 May 1936, the League of Nations allowed Selassie to address the assembly. In response, Italy withdrew its League delegation. Although fluent in French, Selassie chose to deliver his speech in his native Amharic. He asserted that Italy was employing chemical weapons on military and civilian targets alike.

At the beginning of 1936, Time named Selassie "Man of the Year" for 1935, and his June 1936 speech made him an icon for anti-fascists around the world. He failed, however, to get the diplomatic and matériel support he needed. The League agreed to only partial sanctions on Italy, and Selassie was left without much-needed military equipment. Only six nations in 1937 did not recognise Italy's occupation: China, New Zealand, the Soviet Union, the Republic of Spain, Mexico and the United States.

==== Exile ====
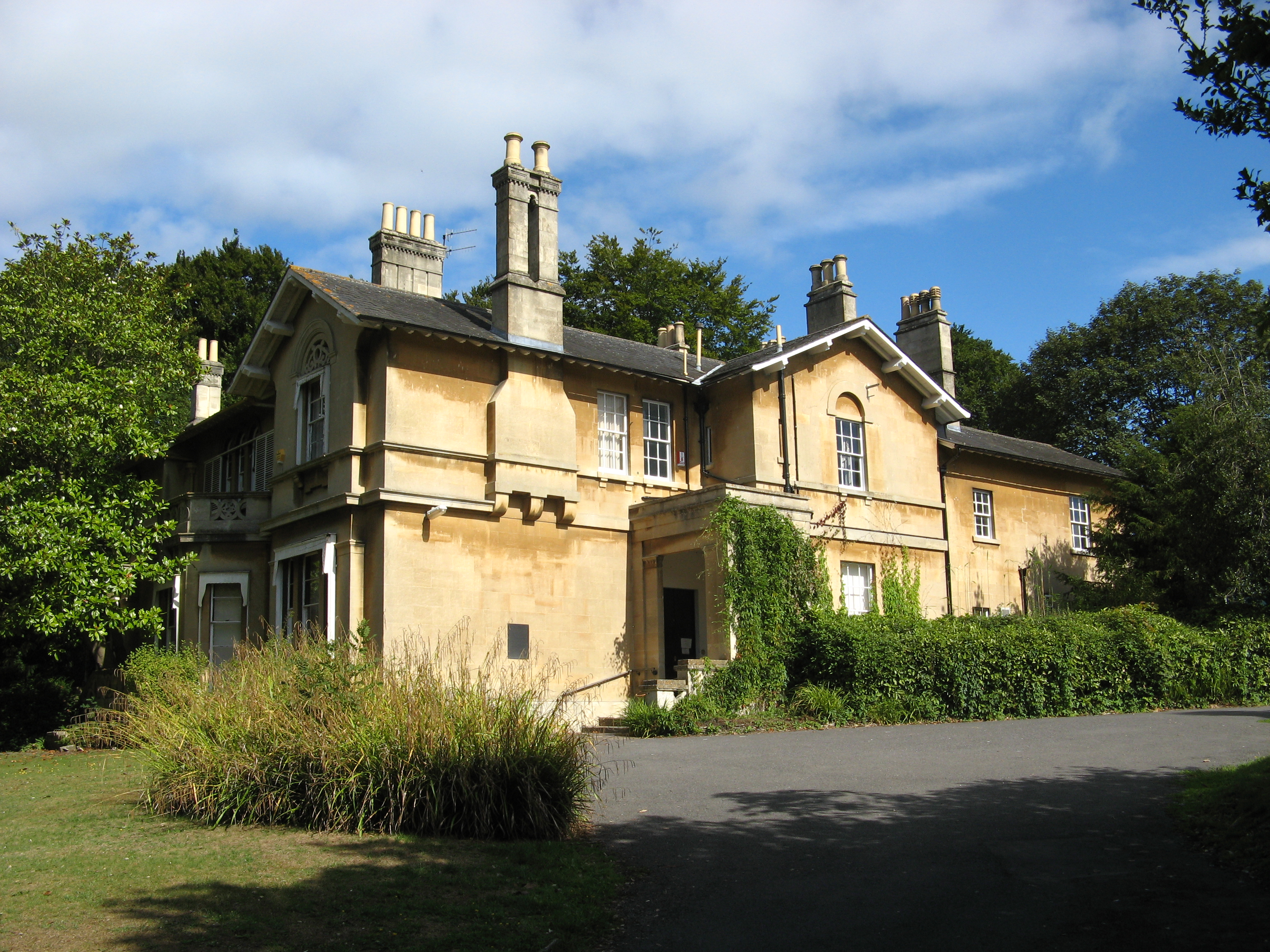
Fairfield House, Bath, was Selassie's residence for five years during the Second Italo-Ethiopian War and parts of World War II

Selassie spent his exile years (1936–1941) in Bath, England, in Fairfield House, which he bought. The Emperor and Kassa Haile Darge took morning walks together behind the 14-room Victorian house's high walls. His favorite reading was "diplomatic history". It was during his exile in England that he began writing his 90,000-word autobiography.

Prior to Fairfield House, he briefly stayed at Warne's Hotel in Worthing and in Parkside, Wimbledon. A bust of Haile Selassie by Hilda Seligman stood in nearby Cannizaro Park to commemorate his stay, and was a popular place of pilgrimage for London's Rastafari community, until it was destroyed by protestors on 30 June 2020. Selassie stayed at the Abbey Hotel in Malvern in the 1930s, and his granddaughters and daughters of court officials were educated at Clarendon School for Girls in North Malvern. During his time in Malvern, he attended services at Holy Trinity Church, in Link Top. A blue plaque commemorating his stay in Malvern was unveiled on Saturday, 25 June 2011. As part of the ceremony, a delegation from the Rastafari movement gave a short address and a drum recital.

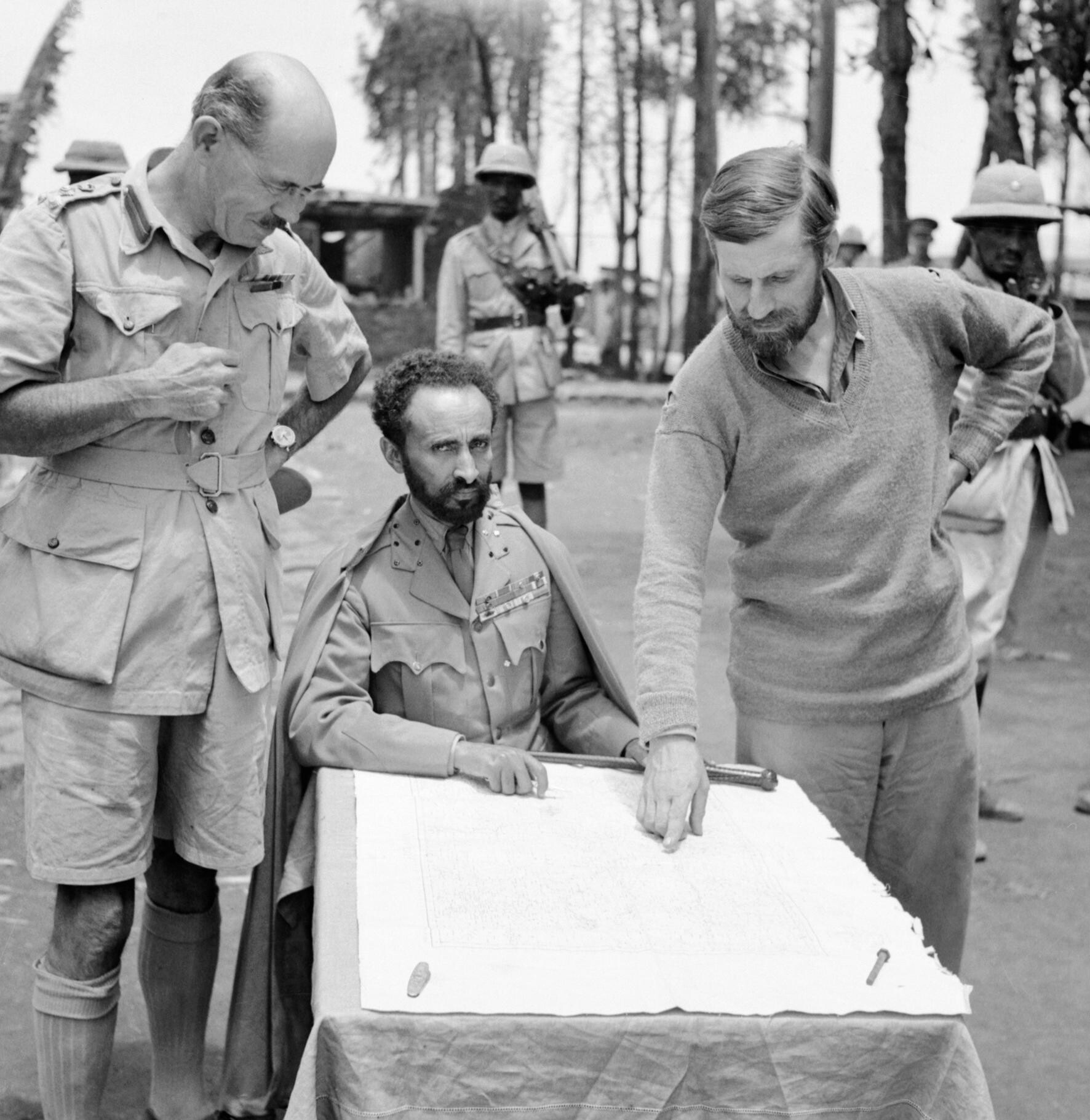
Haile Selassie with Brigadier Daniel Sandford (left) and Colonel Wingate (right) in Dambacha Fort, after its capture, 15 April 1941

Selassie's activity in this period was focused on countering Italian propaganda as to the Ethiopian resistance and the legality of the occupation. He spoke out against the desecration of houses of worship and historical artifacts, including the theft of a 1,600-year-old imperial obelisk, and condemned the atrocities suffered by the Ethiopian civilian population. He continued to plead for League intervention and to voice his certainty that "God's judgment will eventually visit the weak and the mighty alike", though his attempts to gain support for the struggle against Italy were largely unsuccessful until Italy entered World War II on the German side in June 1940.

Selassie's pleas for international support took root in the United States, particularly among African-American organisations sympathetic to the Ethiopian cause. In 1937, Haile Selassie was to give a Christmas Day radio address to the American people to thank his supporters when his taxi was involved in a traffic accident, leaving him with a fractured knee. He delivered the address despite his injury, in which he linked Christianity and goodwill with the Covenant of the League of Nations, and asserted that war can be resolved diplomatically.

During this period, Selassie suffered several personal tragedies. His two sons-in-law, Ras Desta Damtew and Dejazmach Beyene Merid, were both executed by the Italians. The Emperor's daughter, Princess Romanework, wife of Dejazmach Beyene Merid, was taken into captivity with her children, and she died in Italy in 1941. His daughter Tsehai died during childbirth shortly after the restoration in 1942.

After his return to Ethiopia, Selassie donated Fairfield House to the city of Bath as a residence for the aged. In 2019, two blue plaques commemorating his residence at Fairfield and his visits to nearby Weston-super-Mare were unveiled by his grandson.

== Restoration ==
=== World War II and return ===
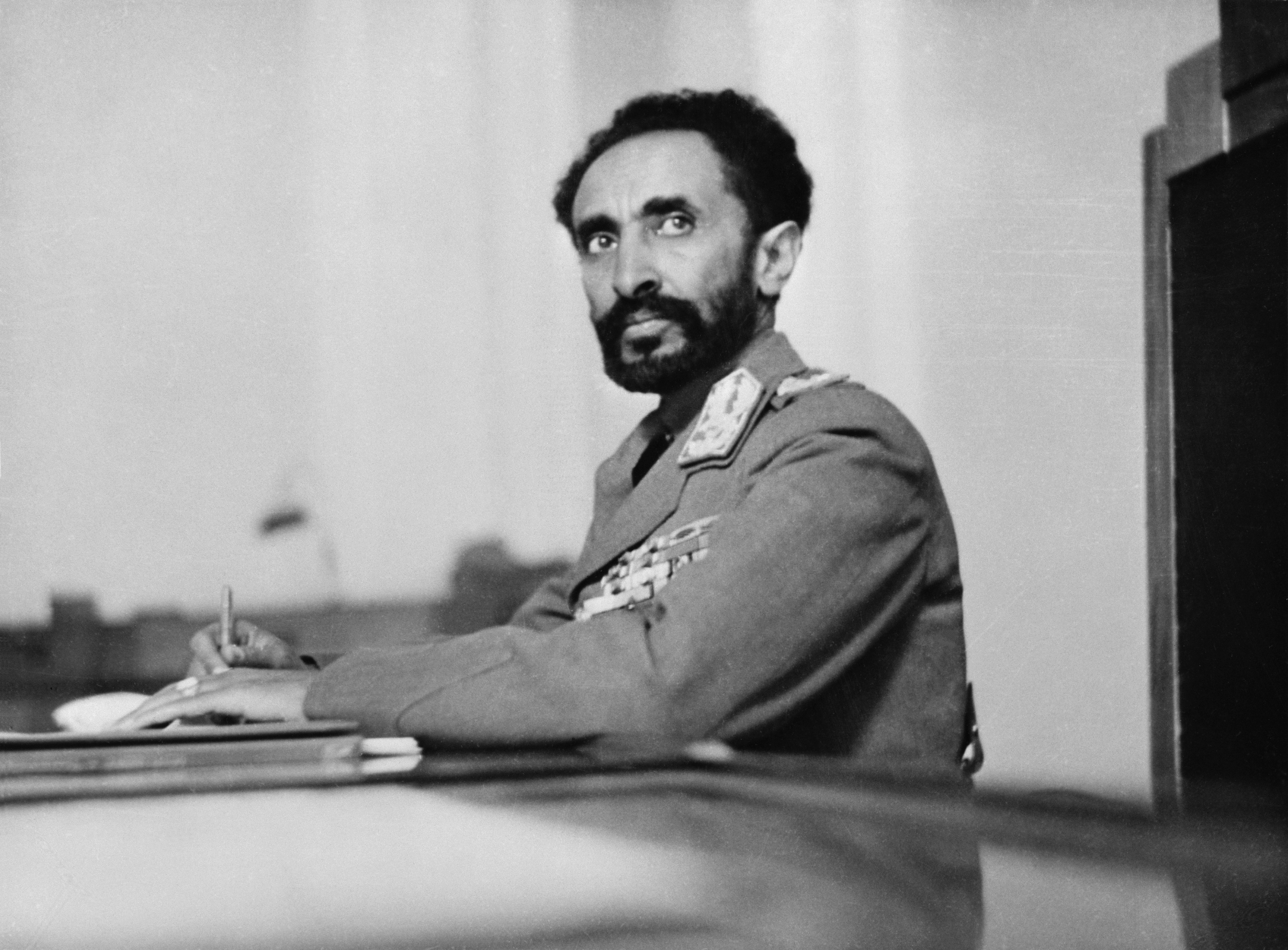
Haile Selassie in 1942

British forces, which consisted primarily of Ethiopian-backed African and South African colonial troops under the "Gideon Force" of Colonel Orde Wingate, coordinated the military effort to liberate Ethiopia. Selassie issued several imperial proclamations in this period, demonstrating that British military might and the Emperor's popular appeal could be joined in the concerted effort to liberate Ethiopia.

On 18 January 1941, during the East African Campaign, Selassie crossed the border between Sudan and Ethiopia, near the village of Um Iddla. The standard of the Lion of Judah was raised again. Two days later, he and a force of Ethiopian patriots joined with Gideon Force, which was already in Ethiopia and preparing the way.

Italy was defeated by combined forces of the United Kingdom, the Commonwealth of Nations, Free France, Free Belgium, and Ethiopian partisans. On 5 May 1941, Selassie entered Addis Ababa and personally addressed the Ethiopian people, exactly five years after the fascist forces entered Addis Ababa. He urged them not to reciprocate the atrocities they had been subjected to.

On 27 August 1942, Selassie confirmed the legal basis for the abolition of slavery that had been illegally enacted by Italian occupying forces throughout the empire and imposed severe penalties, including capital punishment for slave trading.

=== Postwar ===
After World War II, Ethiopia became a charter member of the United Nations. In 1948, the Ogaden, a region disputed with both Italian Somaliland and British Somaliland, was granted to Ethiopia. After the war, Italy was stripped of all her overseas possessions. On 2 December 1950, the UN General Assembly adopted Resolution 390 (V), which ceded the former Italian colony of Eritrea to the Ethiopian Empire. Eritrea was to have its own constitution, which would provide for ethnic, linguistic, and cultural balance, while Ethiopia was to manage its finances, defense, and foreign policy.

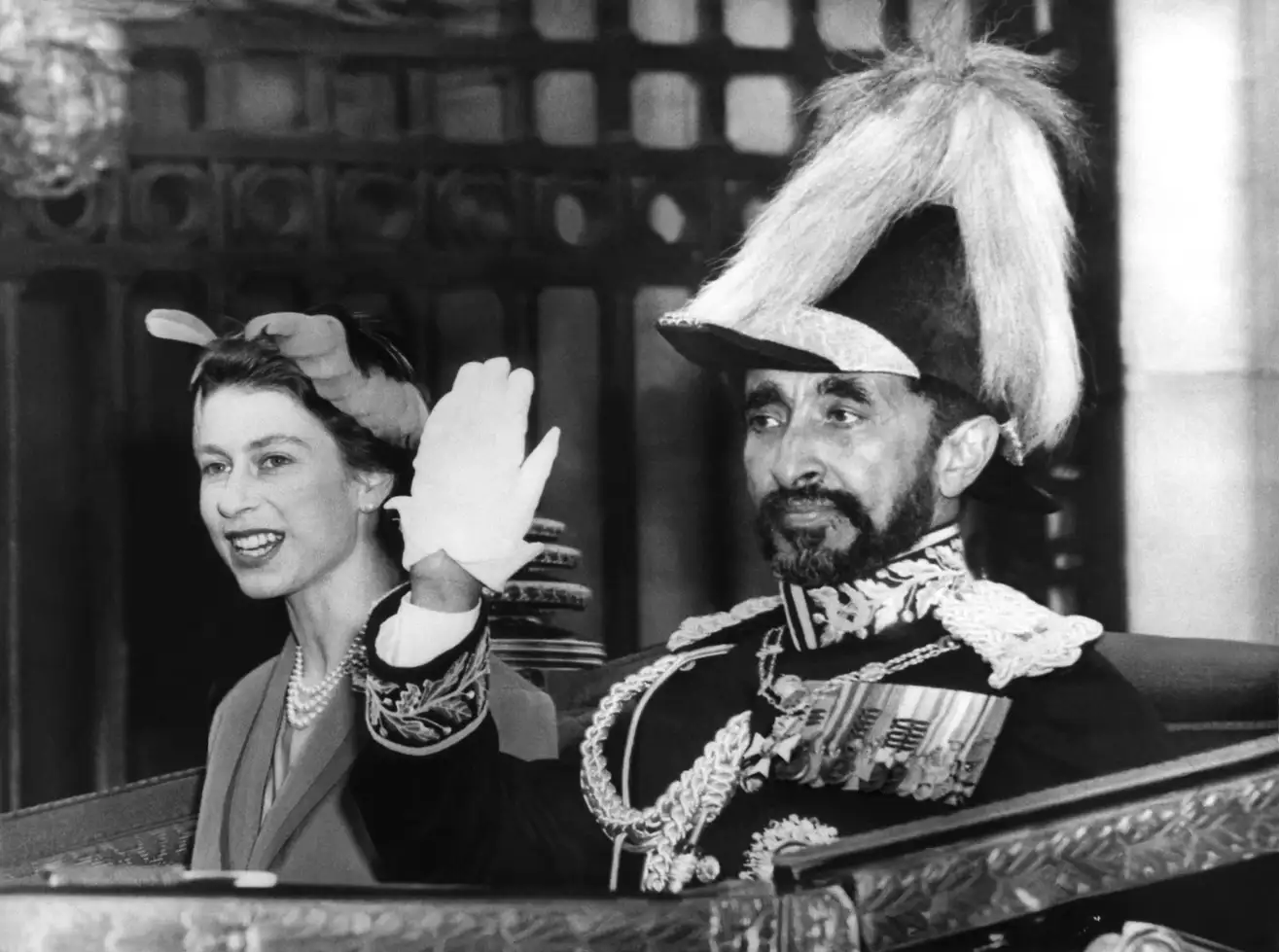
With Queen Elizabeth II heading to Buckingham Palace, 1954

Despite his centralisation policies that had been made before World War II, Selassie still found himself unable to push for all the programmes he wanted. In 1942, he attempted to institute a progressive tax scheme, but this failed because of opposition from the nobility, and only a flat tax was passed; in 1951, he agreed to reduce this as well. Ethiopia was still "semi-feudal", and the Emperor's attempts to alter its social and economic form by reforming its modes of taxation met with resistance from the nobility and clergy, which were eager to resume their privileges in the post-war era. Where Selassie actually did succeed in effecting new land taxes, the burdens were often still passed by the landowners onto the peasants.

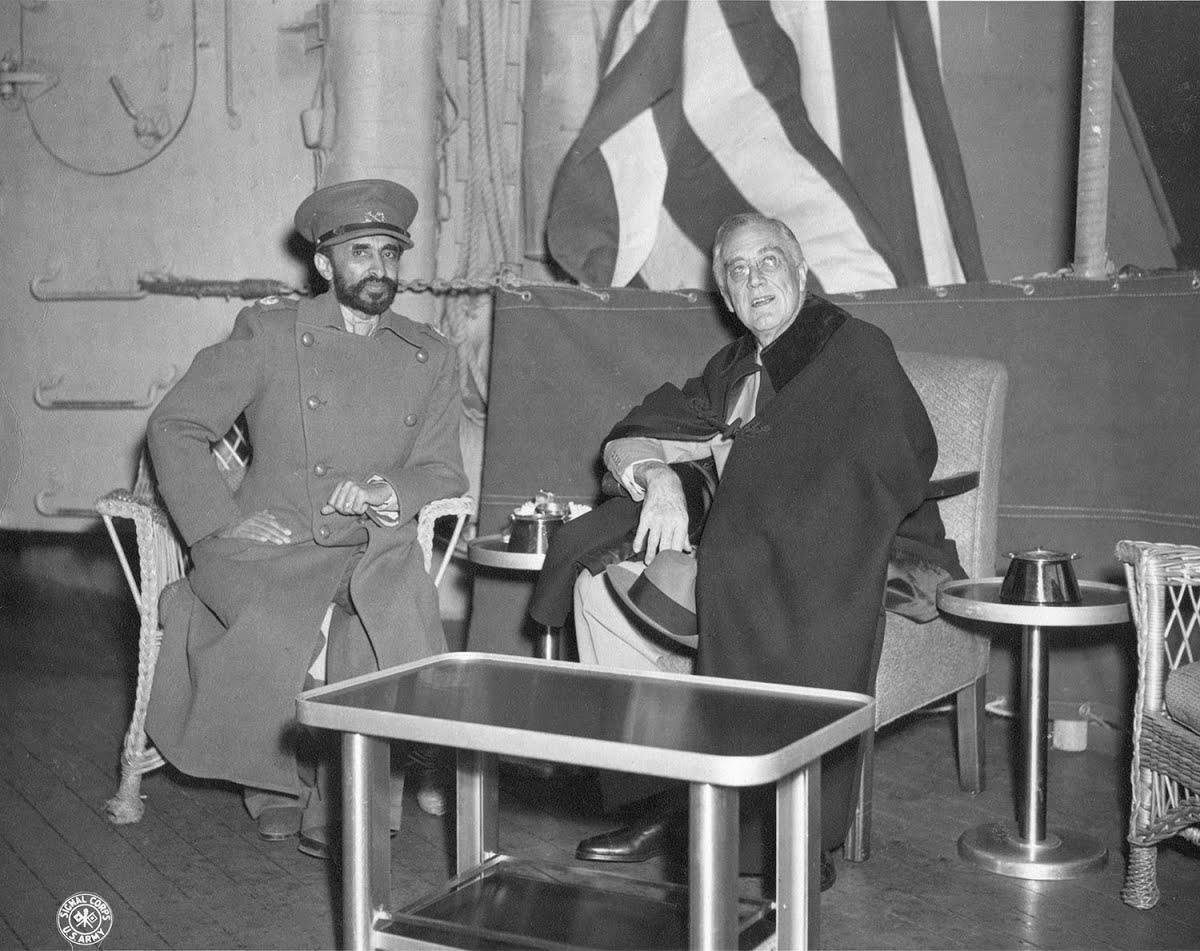
With President Franklin Delano Roosevelt on board the USS Quincy (CA-71) in Egypt after the Yalta Conference, 13 February 1945

Selassie with Sir Winston Churchill at Downing Street, 22 October 1954

Between 1941 and 1959, Selassie worked to establish the autocephaly of the Ethiopian Orthodox Tewahedo Church. For centuries the Ethiopian Orthodox Church had been headed by the Abuna, a bishop chosen by and answerable to the Pope of the Coptic Orthodox Church of Alexandria. In 1942 and 1945, Selassie applied to the Holy Synod of the Coptic Orthodox Church to establish the independence of Ethiopian bishops, and when his appeals were denied he threatened to sever relations with the Coptic Church of Alexandria. Finally, in 1959, Pope Kyrillos VI elevated the Abuna to Patriarch-Catholicos. The Ethiopian Church remained affiliated with the Alexandrian Church. In addition to these efforts, Selassie changed the Ethiopian church-state relationship by introducing taxation of church lands, and by restricting the legal privileges of the clergy, who had formerly been tried in their own courts for civil offenses.

In 1956, on a state visit to India, he met with Indian leaders who supported Ethiopia against fascist Italy's illegal occupation during the 1935–1941 war against the country. Selassie also discussed with Indian prime minister Jawaharlal Nehru relating to Asian and African decolonisation, and cooperation between economic and education sectors.

In 1948, Harari and Somali Muslims staged a significant rebellion against the empire in Harar. The state responded with a violent crackdown. Hundreds were arrested and the entire town of Harar was put under martial law. The government also seized many assets and estates belonging to the people. This led to a massive exodus of Hararis from the region. Harari dissatisfaction stemmed from the fact that they had never received autonomy for Harar, which was promised by Menelik II after his conquest of the kingdom. The promise was eroded by successive Amhara governors of Harar and infringed by Selassie himself. According to historians Tim Carmicheal and Roman Loimeier, Selassie was directly involved in the suppression of the Harari movement that formed as a response to the crackdown on Hararis who collaborated with the Italians during their occupation of Ethiopia from 1935 to 1941.

In keeping with the principle of collective security, for which he was an outspoken proponent, Selassie sent Ethiopian armed forces to take part in the Korean War to fight in support of the United Nations Command. The elite Kagnew Battalion, under General Mulugueta Bulli, was attached to the American 7th Infantry Division, and fought with distinction in a number of major engagements including the Battle of Pork Chop Hill. In a 1954 speech, Selassie spoke of Ethiopian participation in the Korean War as a redemption of the principles of collective security.

In 1959, Selassie was significant in making Addis Adaba the headquarters for the United Nations Economic Commission for Africa.

=== Second constitutional period ===
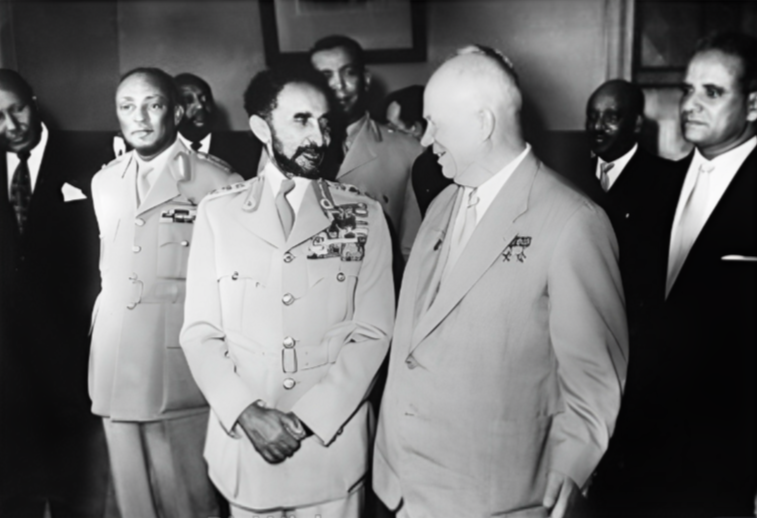
Haile Selassie with Nikita Khrushchev, Moscow, 1959

During the celebrations of his Silver Jubilee in November 1955, Selassie introduced a revised constitution, whereby he retained effective power, while extending political participation to the people by allowing the lower house of parliament to become an elected body. Party politics were not provided for. Modern educational methods became more widely spread throughout the Empire.

The country embarked on a development scheme and plans for modernisation, tempered by Ethiopian traditions, and within the framework of the state's ancient monarchical structure. Selassie compromised, when practical, with the traditionalists in the nobility and church. He also tried to improve relations between the state and ethnic groups, and granted autonomy to Afar lands that were difficult to control. Still, his reforms to end feudalism were slow and weakened by the compromises he made with the entrenched aristocracy. The revised constitution of 1955 has been criticised for reasserting "the indisputable power of the monarch" and maintaining the relative powerlessness of the peasants.

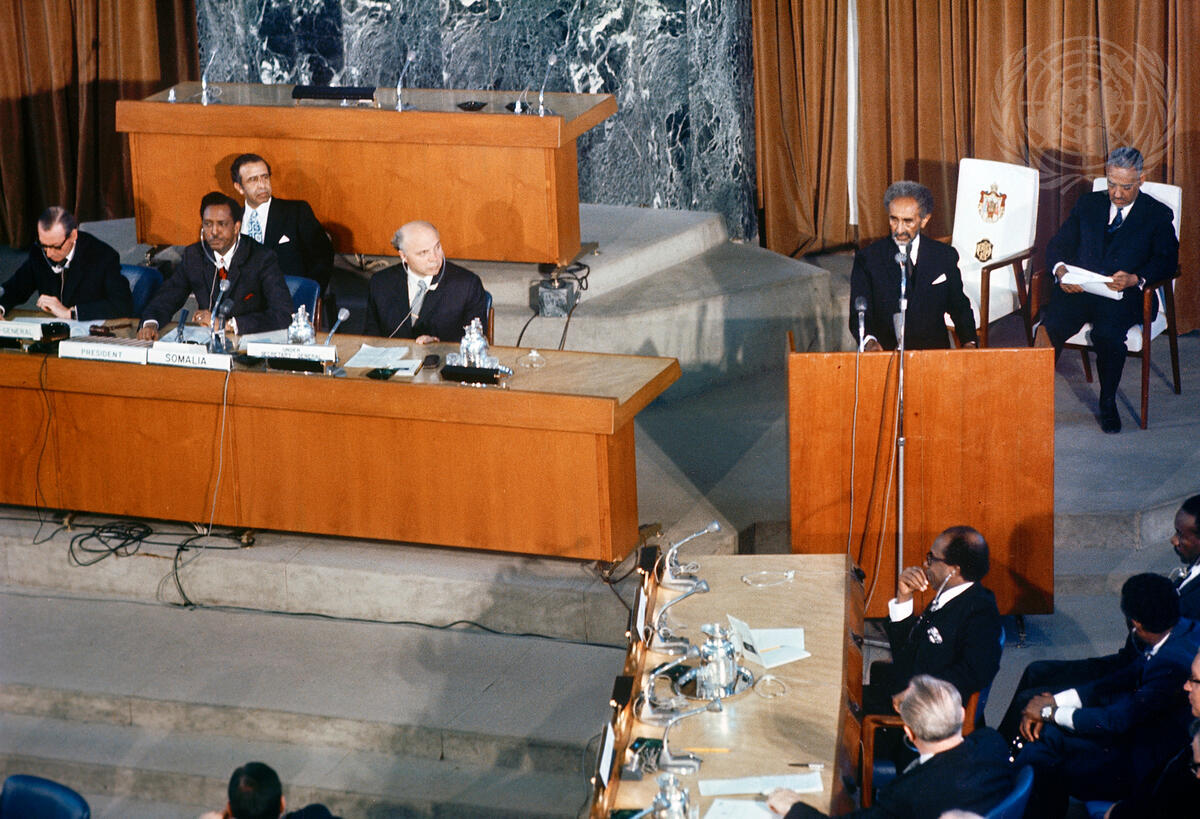
Emperor Haile Selassie at the UN Security Council meeting in Addis Ababa in 1972

Selassie also maintained cordial relations with the government of the United Kingdom through charitable gestures. He sent aid to the British government in 1947 when Britain was affected by heavy flooding. His letter to Lord Meork, National Distress Fund, London said, "even though We are busy of helping our people who didn't recover from the crises of the war, We heard that your fertile and beautiful country is devastated by the unusually heavy rain, and your request for aid. Therefore, We are sending a small amount of money, about one thousand pounds through our embassy to show our sympathy and cooperation."

==== 1958 famine of Tigray ====
In the summer of 1958, a widespread famine in the Tigray province of northern Ethiopia was already two years old yet people in Addis Ababa knew hardly anything about it. When significant reports of death finally reached the Ministry of Interior in September 1959 the central government immediately disclosed the information to the public and began asking for contributions. The Emperor personally donated 2,000 tons of relief grain, the U.S. sent 32,000 tons, which was distributed between Eritrea and Tigray, and money for aid was raised throughout the country but it is estimated that approximately 100,000 people had died before the crisis ended in August 1961. The causes of the famine were attributed to drought, locusts, hailstone and epidemics of small-pox, typhus, measles and malaria.

=== Attempted coup and era of decolonization ===
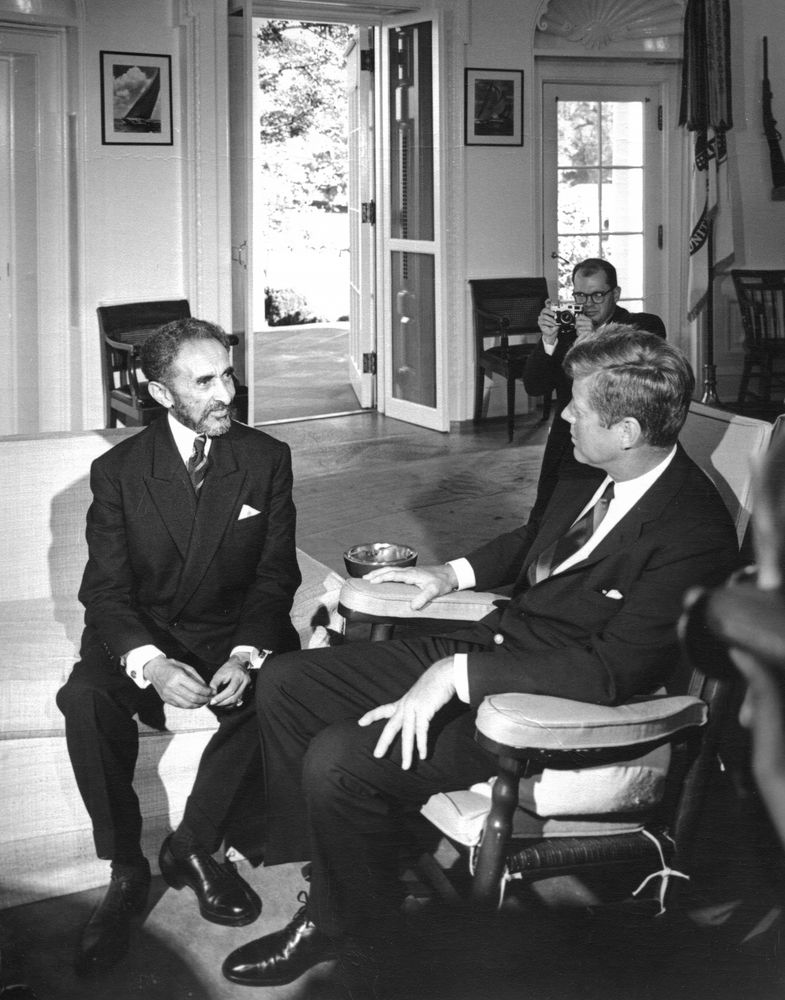
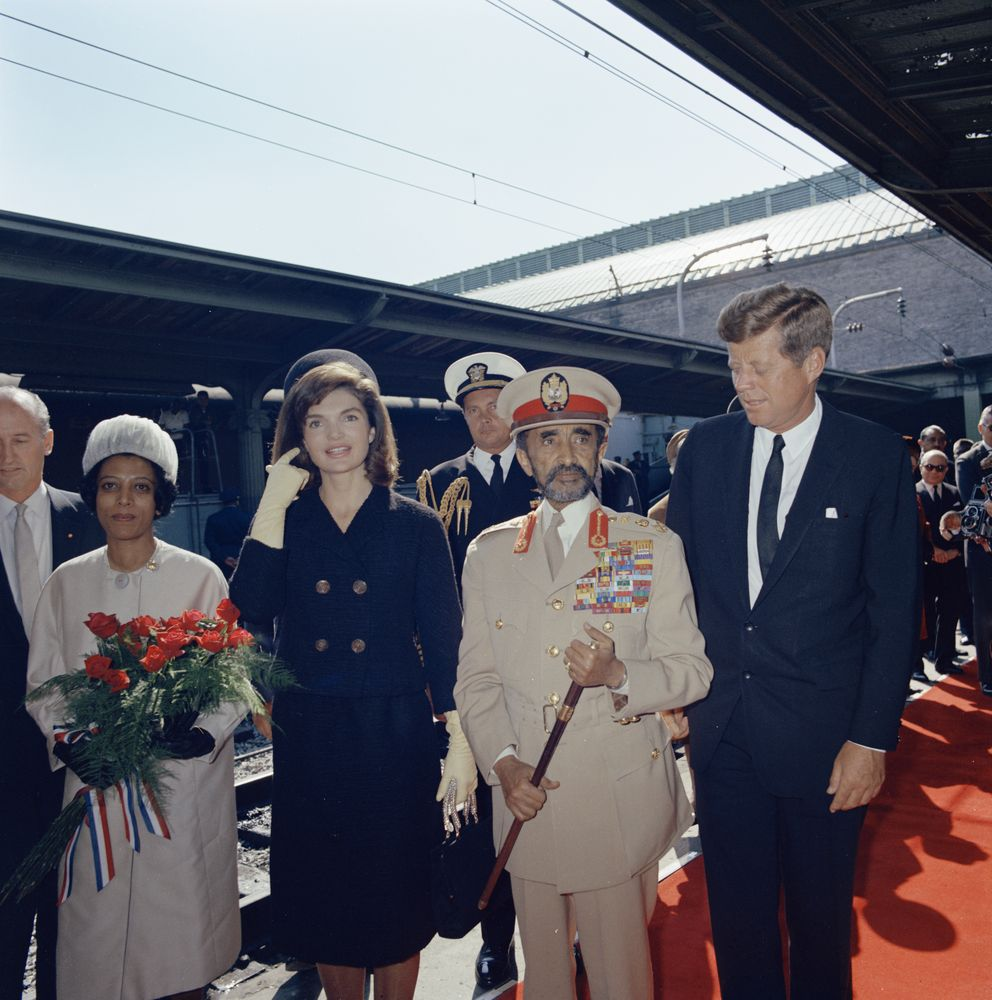
With John F. Kennedy, October 1963

Selassie contributed Ethiopian troops to the United Nations Operation in the Congo peacekeeping force during the 1960 Congo Crisis, per United Nations Security Council Resolution 143.

On 13 December 1960, while Selassie was on a state visit to Brazil, the imperial guard staged an unsuccessful coup, briefly proclaiming Selassie's elder son, Asfa Wossen, as emperor. The regular army and police forces crushed the coup d'état. The coup plotters lacked broad popular support, were denounced by the Ethiopian Orthodox Church, and were unpopular with the military and police. Nonetheless, the effort had support among students and the educated classes. The attempt has been characterised as a pivotal moment in Ethiopian history, the point at which Ethiopians "for the first time questioned the power of the king to rule without the people's consent". Student populations began to empathise with the peasantry and poor and advocate on their behalf. The coup spurred Selassie to accelerate reform, manifested as land grants to military and police officials and political groups.

Video of Haile Selassie's 1968 United Nations speech

Selassie continued to be a staunch ally of the West, while pursuing a firm policy of decolonisation in Africa, which was still largely under European colonial rule. The United Nations conducted a lengthy inquiry regarding Eritrea's status, with the superpowers each vying for a stake in the state's future. Britain, the administrator at the time, suggested Eritrea's partition between Sudan and Ethiopia, separating Christians and Muslims. The idea was instantly rejected by Eritrean political parties, as well as the UN.

==== Eritrean annexation and uprising ====
A UN plebiscite voted to have Eritrea federated with Ethiopia, later stipulated on 2 December 1950 in resolution 390 (V). Eritrea would have its own parliament and administration and would be represented in what had been the Ethiopian parliament and would become the federal parliament. Selassie rejected European attempts to draft a separate constitution under which Eritrea would be governed, and wanted his own 1955 constitution protecting families to apply in both Ethiopia and Eritrea. In 1961 the 30-year Eritrean War for Independence began, followed by the dissolution of the federation and shutting down of Eritrea's parliament.

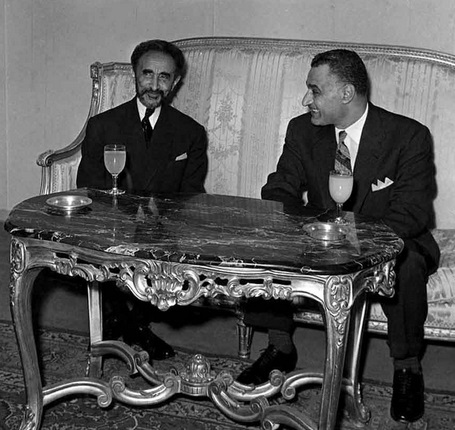
With Egyptian president Gamal Abdel Nasser in Addis Ababa for the Organisation of African Unity summit, 1963

In September 1961, Selassie attended the Summit Conference of Heads of State or Government of the Non-Aligned Movement in Belgrade, FPR Yugoslavia. This is considered to be the founding conference of the Non-Aligned Movement.

In 1961, tensions between independence-minded Eritreans and Ethiopian forces culminated in the Eritrean War of Independence. Eritrea's elected parliament voted to become the fourteenth province of Ethiopia in 1962. The war would continue for 30 years; first Selassie, then the Soviet-backed junta that succeeded him, attempted to retain Eritrea by force.

In 1963, Selassie presided over the formation of the Organisation of African Unity (OAU), the precursor of the continent-wide African Union (AU). The new organisation would establish its headquarters in Addis Ababa. In May of that year, Selassie was elected as the OAU's first official chairperson, a rotating seat. Along with Modibo Keïta of Mali, the Ethiopian leader would later help successfully negotiate the Bamako Accords, which brought an end to the border conflict between Morocco and Algeria. In 1964, Selassie would initiate the concept of the United States of Africa, a proposition later taken up by Muammar Gaddafi.

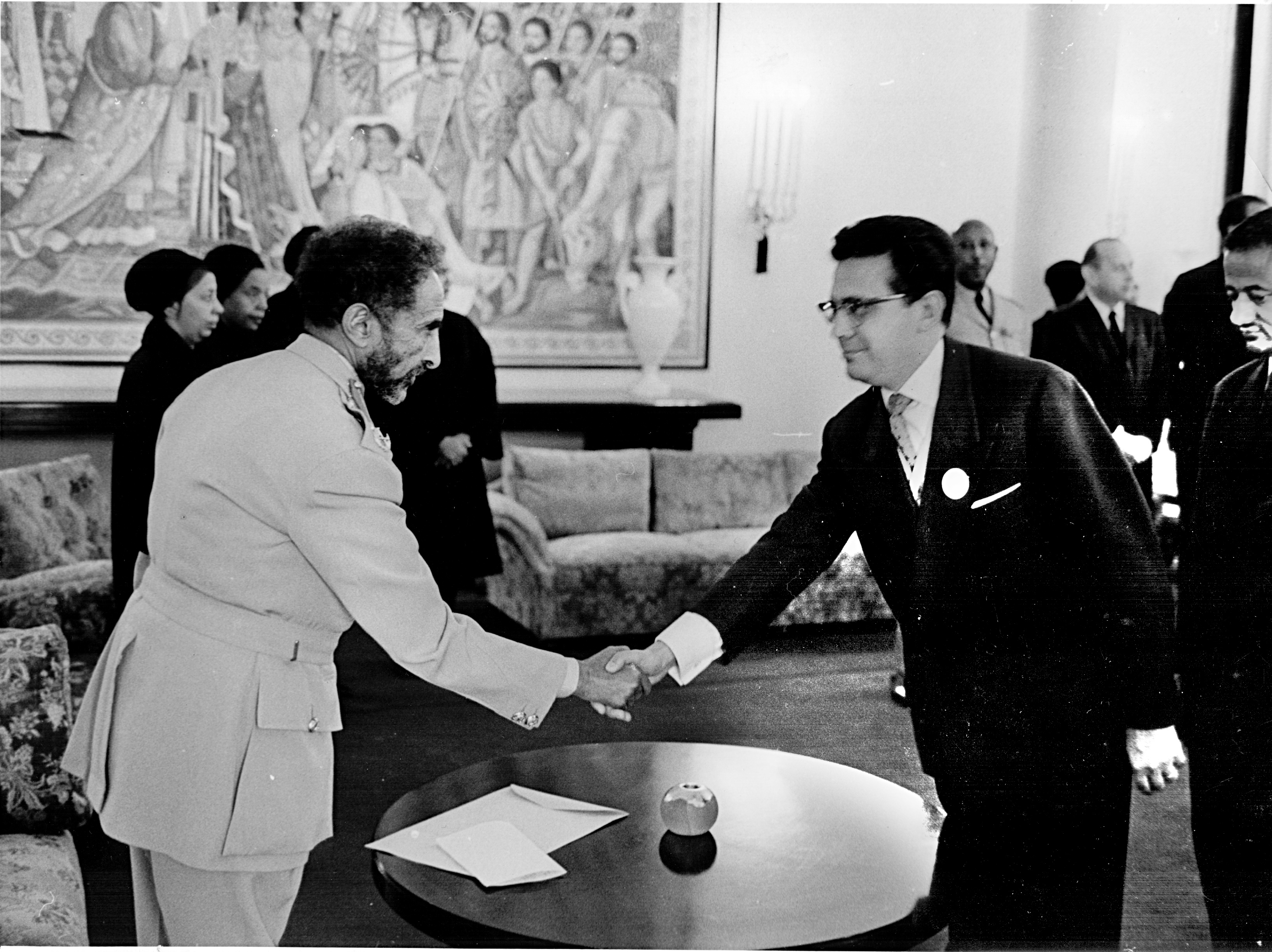
Emperor Haile Selassie greeting Tunisia's Ambassador and Head of Delegation Ahmed Mestiri at the Third Session of the United Nations Economic Commission for Africa (ECA) held in Addis Abeba on 19 February 1961.

In 1963, a revolt in Bale occurred, where peasant rioters whom were discouraged by the Ethiopian taxation headed by Prime Minister Aklilu Habte-Wold later turned into an insurgency. This caused a semi-civil war with terrorist activities carried out by rebels supported by Somalia which later forced the Ethiopian government to declare a state of emergency. The Emperor's armed forces led by Prime Minister Aklilu's cabinet with the support of the United Kingdom and the United States were able to end the revolt after over six years of insurgency. This assured weakened diplomatic ties with Siad Barre's Somalia.

==== Reform efforts and relations with the West ====
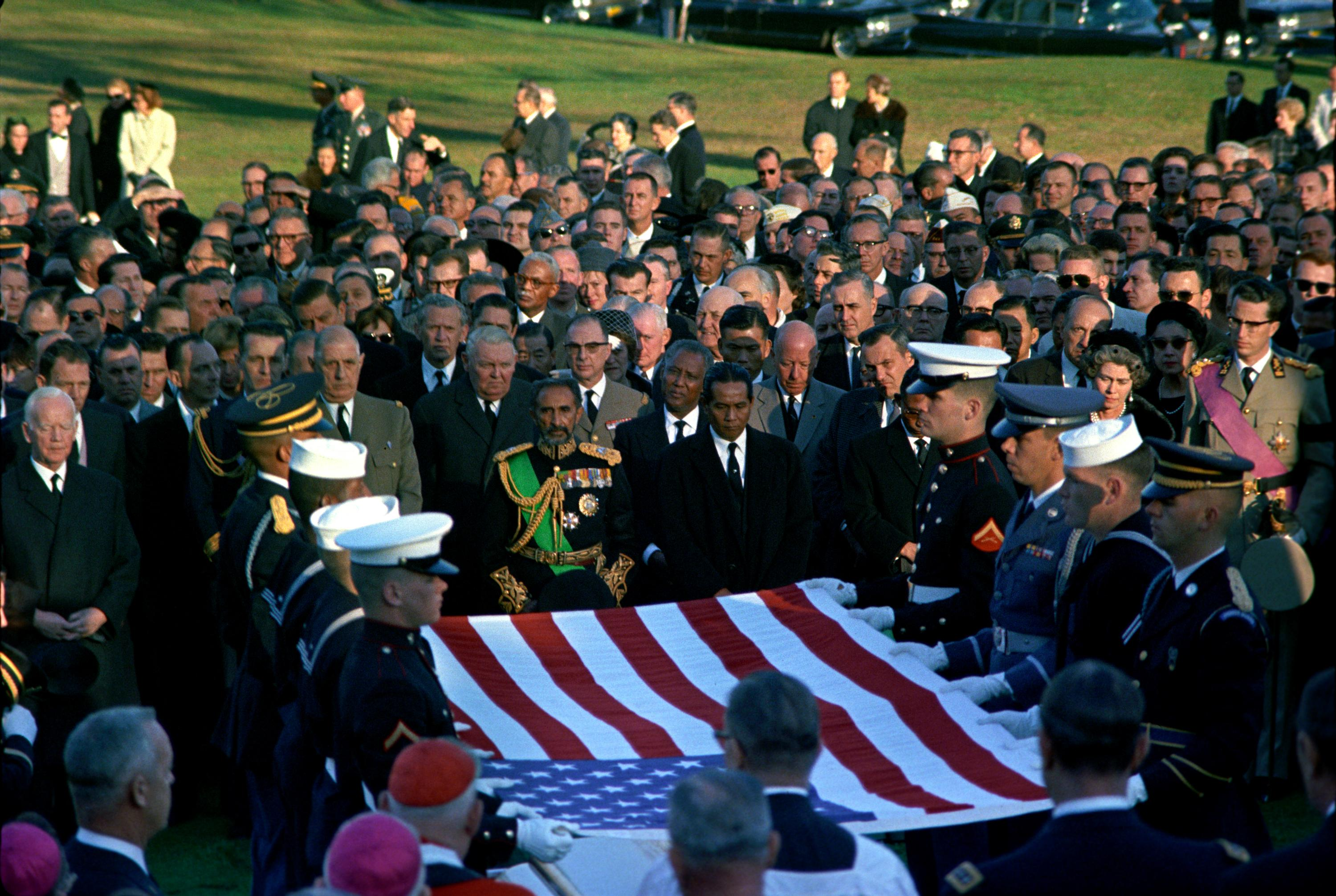
At the state funeral of John F. Kennedy, 25 November 1963

On 4 October 1963, Selassie addressed the General Assembly of the United Nations.

On 25 November 1963, the Emperor traveled to Washington, D.C., and attended the state funeral of assassinated U.S. president John F. Kennedy. He was the only African head of state to attend the funeral. In addition, he was the only one of the three prominent world leaders that would have another meeting with the new president, Lyndon B. Johnson, in Washington during his presidency; he met Johnson again during an informal visit to the United States in 1967.

In 1966, Selassie attempted to replace the historical tax system with a single progressive income tax, which would weaken the nobility who had avoided paying most of their taxes. This law led to a revolt in Gojjam, which was repressed although enforcement of the tax was abandoned. Having achieved its design in undermining the tax, the revolt encouraged other landowners to defy Selassie. In October that year, Selassie had a four-day visit to the Kingdom of Jordan hosted by King Hussein. During this trip, Selassie visited Jerusalem and the Church of the Holy Sepulchre.

While he had assured Ethiopia's participation in UN-approved collective security operations, including Korea and Congo, Selassie drew a distinction between it and the intervention in Indochina, deploring it as needless suffering and calling for the Vietnam War to end. At the same time, he remained open toward the United States, commending it for making progress with African Americans' Civil Rights legislation in the 1950s and 1960s and visiting the US several times during these years.

In 1967, he visited Montréal, Canada, to open the Ethiopian Pavilion at the Expo '67 World's Fair where he received great acclaim among other world leaders there for the occasion.

=== Later reign ===
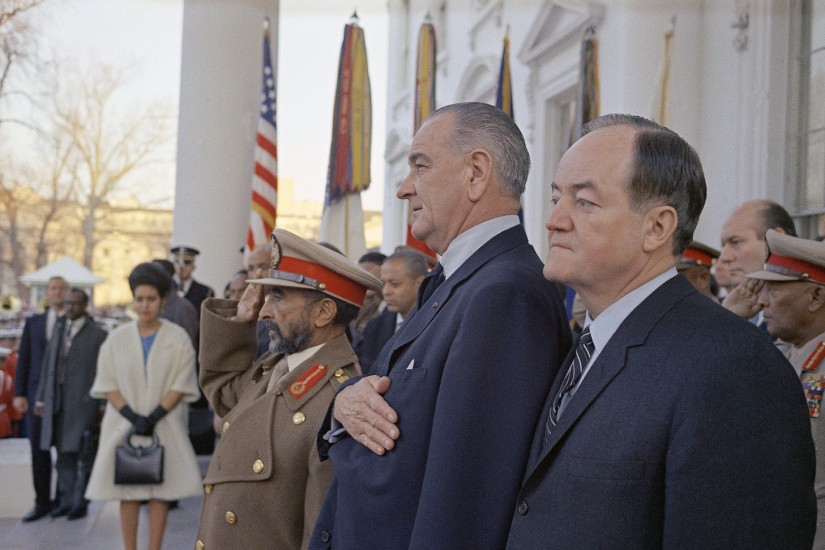
During a visit to Washington, D.C. with President Lyndon B. Johnson, 1967

As the 1970s began, in contrast to most monarchs at the era, Selassie's political influence continued to be of great significance; he was said to utilize as many as four spy agencies, all which concurrently spied on each other as well as civilian and military circles of the nation. He was the only person who knew the 'true' scope of things in Ethiopia.

Student unrest became a regular feature of Ethiopian life in the 1960s and 1970s. Communism took root among the Ethiopian intelligentsia, particularly those who had studied abroad and been exposed to radical and left-wing sentiments. Resistance by conservatives at the Imperial Court and Parliament, and by the Ethiopian Orthodox Church, made Selassie's land reform proposals difficult to implement. The standing of the government was damaged, costing Selassie much goodwill and sowing resentment among the peasant population. Efforts to weaken unions also hurt his image.

In the last years of his rule, civil liberties and political rights in Ethiopia were low, with Freedom House giving Ethiopia a "Not Free" score in both categories. Common human rights abuses included poor prison conditions and the imprisonment and torture of political dissidents. Nonetheless, the Emperor was known for pardoning hundreds of prisoners at a time and there were no more than ten political prisoners during his entire reign.

The Imperial Army also carried out a multiple atrocities during the war with Eritrean separatists in the late 1960s and early 1970s.

==== Foreign relations ====
As these issues began to pile up, Selassie left much of domestic governance to Aklilu Habte-Wold and concentrated more on foreign affairs. Over the previous two decades, Ethiopia had received over 400 million dollars in aid, 140 million of that being for the Ethiopian military, and 240 million for economic assistance.

Outside Ethiopia, Selassie continued to enjoy enormous prestige and respect. As the longest-serving head of state in power, he was often given precedence over other leaders at state events, such as the state funerals of John F. Kennedy and Charles de Gaulle, the summits of the Non-Aligned Movement, and the 1971 celebration of the 2,500 years of the Persian Empire.

In 1970, Selassie visited Italy as a guest of President Giuseppe Saragat, and in Milan he met Giordano Dell'Amore, President of the Italian Savings Banks Association. He visited China in October 1971, and was the first foreign head of state to meet Mao Zedong following the death of Mao's designated successor Lin Biao in a plane crash in Mongolia.

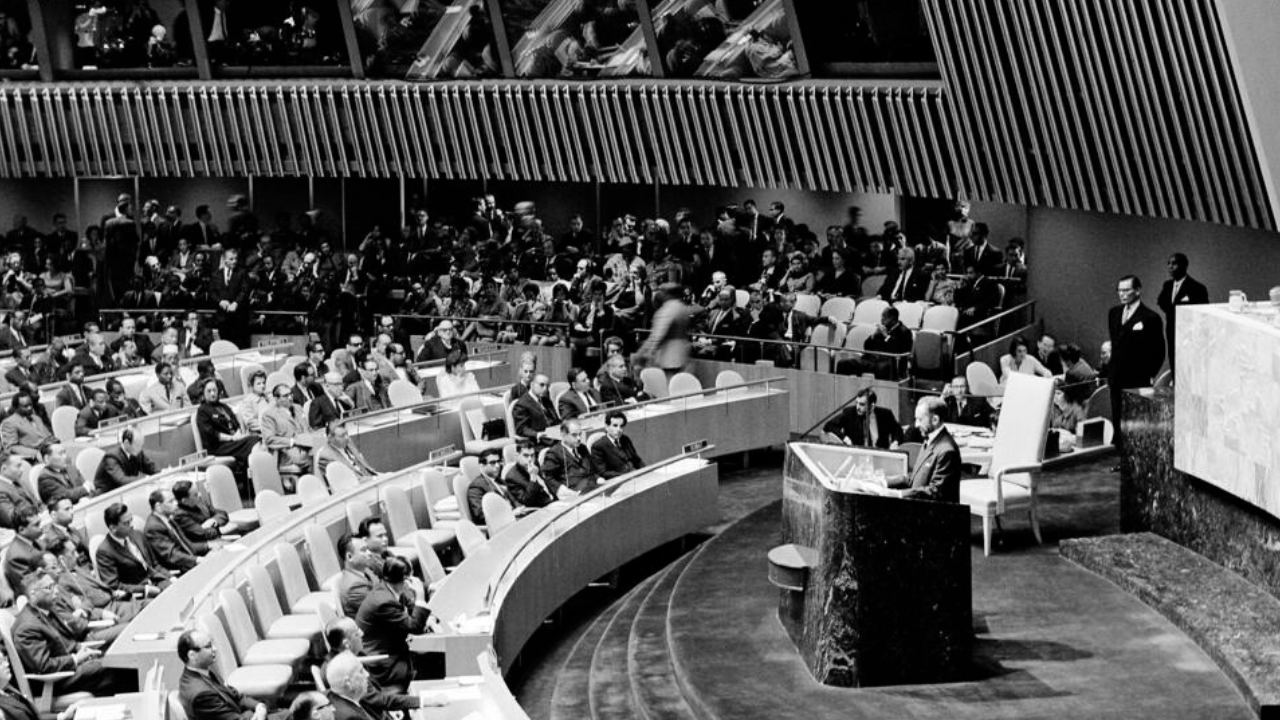
Selassie's speech regarding human rights on 23 October 1970, which marked the 25th anniversary of the United Nations' founding

Selassie went to meet Pope Paul VI in 1970 at Vatican City, where they discussed issues regarding both their countries and history.

==== Wollo famine ====
Famine – mostly in Wollo, north-eastern Ethiopia, as well as in some parts of Tigray – is estimated to have killed 40,000 to 80,000 Ethiopians between 1972 and 1974. Some reports suggest that the Emperor was unaware of the famine's extent, while others assert that he was well aware of it. The famine and its image in the media undermined the government's popular support, and his once unassailable popularity declined.

In addition to the exposure of attempts by corrupt local officials to cover up the famine from the imperial government, the Kremlin's depiction of Selassie's Ethiopia as backwards and inept (relative to the purported utopia of Marxism–Leninism) contributed to the popular uprising that led to its downfall and the rise of Mengistu Haile Mariam. The crisis was exacerbated by military mutinies and high oil prices. The costs of imported goods, gasoline, and food skyrocketed, while unemployment spiked.

== Deposition and death ==
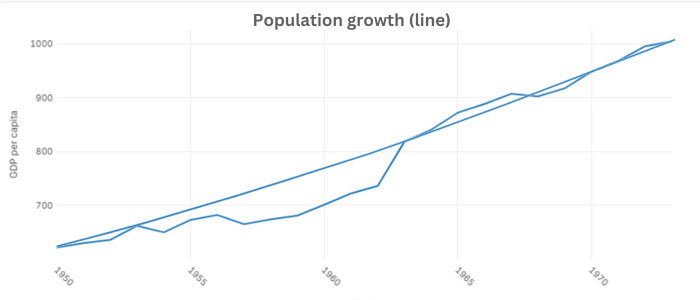
Ethiopia's population and GDP Per Capita growth during a part of Selassie's reign from 1950 to 1973

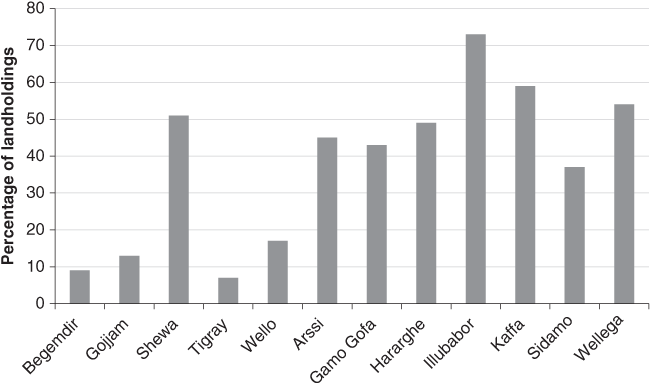
The Land distribution throughout the Ethiopian Empire to nobles throughout each region.

=== Ethiopian Revolution ===
In February 1974, four days of serious riots in Addis Ababa against sudden economic inflation left five dead. The Emperor responded by announcing on national television a reduction in petrol prices and a freeze on the cost of basic commodities. This calmed the public, but the promised 33% military wage hike was not substantial enough to pacify the army, which then mutinied, beginning in Asmara and spreading throughout the empire. This mutiny led to the resignation of Aklilu Habte-Wold as prime minister on 27 February 1974. Selassie again went on television to agree to the army's demands for still greater pay, and named Endelkachew Makonnen as the new prime minister. Despite Endalkachew's many concessions, discontent continued in March with a four-day general strike that paralyzed the nation. In April, protests by Ethiopian Muslims broke out in response to discrimination perpetrated by the regime, with approximately 100,000 individuals participating.

==== Imprisonment ====
The Derg, a clique of junior officers and enlisted men set up in June to investigate the military's demands, took advantage of the government's disarray to depose the 82-year-old Selassie on 12 September. General Aman Mikael Andom, a Protestant of Eritrean origin, served briefly as provisional head of state pending the return of Crown Prince Asfa Wossen, who was then receiving medical treatment abroad. Selassie was imprisoned briefly at the 4th Army Division in Addis Ababa before being moved back to the Grand Palace where the Emperor spent the last months of his life under house arrest.

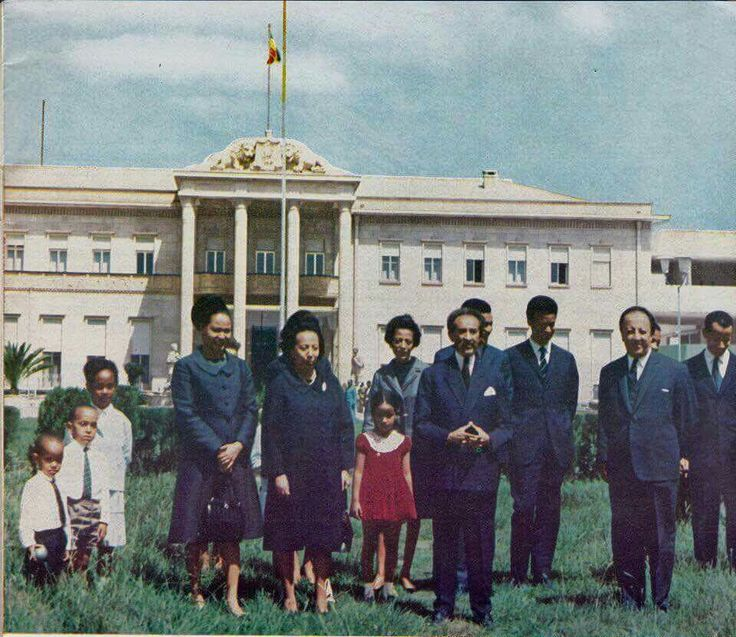
Following the 1974 coup d'état, much of the Ethiopian royal family fled the country, were imprisoned, or were killed.

Though initially most of the imperial family was detained at the late Duke of Harar's residence in the north of the capital, most were later moved into Addis Ababa's Kerchele Prison, also known as "Alem Bekagn". On 23 November, 60 former high officials of the imperial government were summarily executed by firing squad, including Selassie's grandson, Rear Admiral Iskinder Desta, General Aman and two former prime ministers. These killings, known to Ethiopians as "Black Saturday", were condemned by the Crown Prince; the Derg responded to his rebuke by revoking its acknowledgment of his imperial legitimacy, and announcing the end of the Solomonic dynasty.

==== Murder and cover-up ====
On 27 August 1975, Selassie was murdered on the orders of the Derg regime, a fact that was to remain undiscovered for another 20 years. On 28 August 1975, state media reported that Selassie had died on 27 August of "respiratory failure" following complications from a prostate examination followed up by a prostate operation. Asrat Woldeyes denied that complications had occurred and rejected the government version of his death. The prostate operation in question apparently had taken place months before the state media claimed, and Selassie had apparently enjoyed strong health in his last days.

In 1994, three years after the Derg regime was overthrown, an Ethiopian court charged several former military officers with genocide and murder, claiming that it had obtained documents attesting to a high-level order from the military regime to assassinate Selassie in 1975 for leading a "feudal regime". The court found them guilty of strangling the Emperor on his bed within that same year. Documents provided from the trial have been widely circulated online showing the Derg's final assassination order and bearing the military regime's seal and signature. The veracity of these documents has been corroborated by multiple former members of the Derg regime.

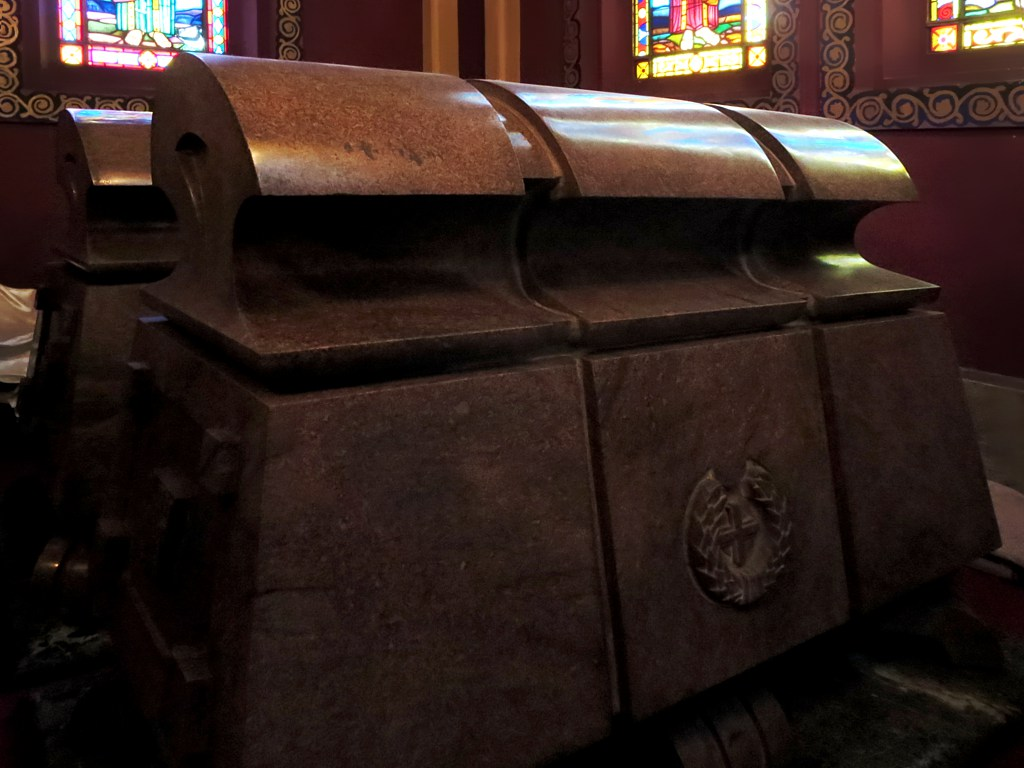
The tombs of Haile Selassie and Menen Asfaw inside the Holy Trinity Cathedral in Addis Ababa

=== Funeral and veneration ===
The Soviet-backed People's Democratic Republic of Ethiopia, the Derg's successor, fell in 1991. In 1992, Selassie's bones were found under a concrete slab on the palace grounds. Selassie's coffin rested in Bhata Church for nearly a decade, near his great-uncle Menelik II's resting place. On 5 November 2000, the Holy Trinity Cathedral in Addis Ababa gave him a funeral, but the government refused calls to declare the ceremony an official imperial funeral. This may have been due to the government's reluctance to endorse or give even subtle political recognition to Royalists.

==== Rastafari reaction ====
Prominent Rastafari figures such as Rita Marley participated in the funeral, but most Rastafari rejected the event and refused to accept that the bones were Selassie's remains. There is some debate within the Rastafari movement as to whether he actually died in 1975.

== Rastafari messiah ==
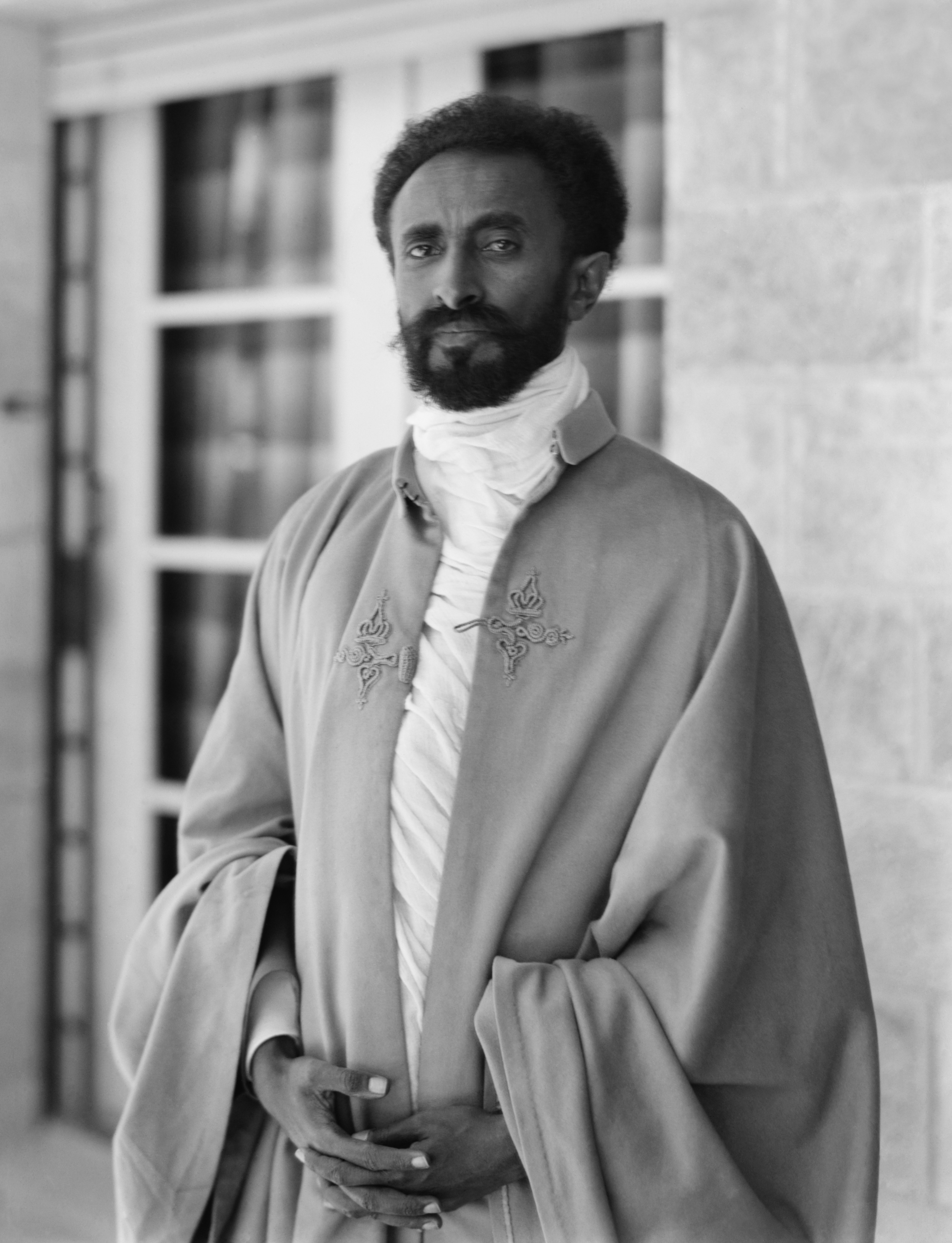
Haile Selassie pictured in 1923, before the emergence of Rastafarian worship

Among some followers of the Rastafari movement (taken from Selassie's pre-imperial name Ras – meaning Head, a title equivalent to Duke), which emerged in Jamaica during the 1930s, he is viewed as the messiah who will lead the peoples of Africa and the African diaspora to freedom. His official titles are Conquering Lion of the Tribe of Judah and King of Kings of Ethiopia, Lord of Lords and Elect of God, and his lineage is said to be from Solomon and Sheba. These notions are perceived by Rastafari as confirmation of the return of the messiah in the Book of Revelation. Rastafari faith in the divinity of Selassie began after news reports of his coronation reached Jamaica, particularly via the two Time magazine articles on the coronation before and after the event. Selassie's own perspectives permeate the philosophy of the movement.

In 1961, the Jamaican government sent a delegation of both Rastafari and non-Rastafari leaders to Ethiopia to discuss repatriation with the Emperor. He told the Rastafari delegation "Tell the Brethren to be not dismayed, I personally will give my assistance in the matter of repatriation."

Selassie visited Jamaica on 21 April 1966, and approximately one hundred thousand Rastafari went to Palisadoes Airport in Kingston to greet him. Spliffs and chalices were openly smoked, causing "a haze of ganja smoke" to drift through the air. Selassie arrived at the airport but was unable to come down the airplane's steps, as the crowd rushed the tarmac. He returned into the plane. The Jamaican authorities were obliged to request Ras Mortimer Planno, a well-known Rasta leader, to climb the steps, enter the plane, and negotiate the Emperor's descent. This day is held by scholars to be a turning point for the movement, and it is commemorated by Rastafari as Grounation Day. From then on, the Jamaican authorities were asked to ensure that Rastafari representatives were present at all state functions attended by the Emperor, and Rastafari elders also ensured that they obtained a private audience with the Emperor, where he told them that they should not emigrate to Ethiopia until they had first liberated the people of Jamaica. This dictum came to be known as "liberation before repatriation".

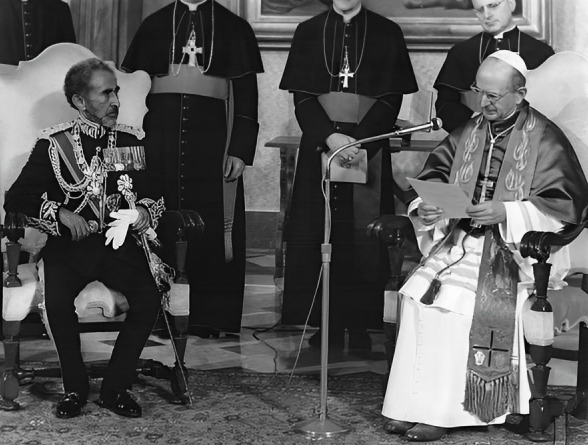
Selassie as the defender of the faith of the Ethiopian Orthodox Tewahedo Church with Pope Paul VI at the Holy See, 10 November 1970

Selassie defied expectations of the Jamaican authorities and never rebuked the Rastafari for their belief in him as God. Instead, he presented the movement's faithful elders with gold medallions. During PNP leader (later Jamaican prime minister) Michael Manley's visit to Ethiopia in October 1969, the Emperor recalled his 1966 reception with amazement, and stated that he felt that he had to be respectful of their beliefs. This was the visit when Manley received the Rod of Correction or Rod of Joshua as a present from the Emperor, thought to have helped him to win the 1972 election in Jamaica.

Rita Marley converted to the Rastafari faith after seeing Selassie on his Jamaican trip. She claimed that she saw a stigmata print on the palm of Selassie's hand as he waved to the crowd. Rastafari became much better known throughout much of the world due to the popularity of Bob Marley. Marley's posthumously released song "Iron Lion Zion" may refer to Selassie.

=== Selassie's position ===
In a 1967 interview with the CBC's Bill McNeil, Selassie denied his alleged divinity. For many Rastafari, the CBC interview is not interpreted as a denial. According to Robert Earl Hood, Selassie neither denied nor affirmed his divinity.

CBC Interview
Selassie visited Canada in 1967 for an official state visit, CBC news interviewed him and asked him a variety of questions including his position on Rastafarianism

After his return to Ethiopia, Selassie dispatched Archbishop Abuna Yesehaq Mandefro to the Caribbean. According to Yesehaq, this was to help draw Rastafari and other West Indians to the Ethiopian church. Some sources suggest that certain islanders and their leaders were resenting the services of their former colonial churches, and vocalised their interest of establishing the Ethiopian church in the Caribbean.

In 1969, Manley visited the Emperor at his palace in Addis Ababa before his election as prime minister of Jamaica in 1972. Selassie spoke about his 1966 visit to Jamaica and told Manley that, though he was confused by the Rastafarians' beliefs, he respected them.

In 1948, Selassie donated 500 hectares of land at Shashamane, 250 kilometres (160 mi) south of Addis Ababa, to the Ethiopian World Federation Incorporated for the use of people of African descent who supported Ethiopia during the war. Numerous Rastafari families settled there and still live as a community to this day. This was controversial among the locals, as the Rastas settled on traditionally Oromo land.

== Residences and finance ==
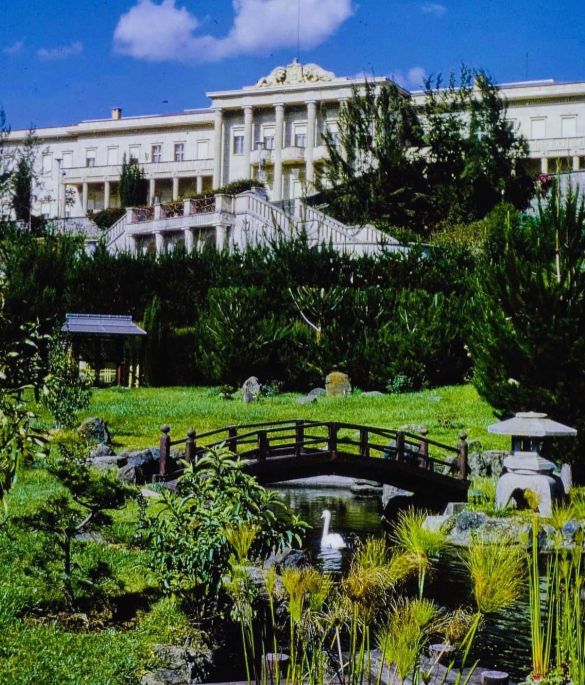
The Jubilee Palace served as the residence of Selassie from 1955

In 1974, Ethiopian media during the revolution claimed the Emperor had a net worth of 11 billion dollars. However, records indicate that Selassie's entire net worth was just £22,000.00 as late as 1959. He was also accused by the Derg to have hoarded millions in Swiss banks, claiming Selassie illegally acquired the money from exploiting the Ethiopian people.

The Jubilee Palace, built in 1955, served as the official residence of the head of state of Ethiopian Empire from 1955 to 1974. The Palace sits on 11,450 square metres (123,200 sq ft) in the center of Addis Ababa, the capital of Ethiopia since 1889. The Palace's estimated initial construction cost and its value today are undisclosed, but due to its size, location and historical importance, its value would be in the hundreds of millions of dollars.

Selassie owned a large fleet of cars including ones gifted to him during overseas visits, which may be worth millions of dollars. In addition, a battle took place over a decade regarding his Patek Phillipe watch, which was initially offered in a Christie's auction with an estimated value of over $1 million. However, after the feud ended, the watch was withdrawn from the auction.

== Personal life ==
=== Visual, performing, and literary arts ===
In his private life, Selassie advocated the growth of Ethiopian art. He believed that arts could 'rebuild' the country. He was interested in a modern outlook towards traditional Ethiopian arts, including those of the Ethiopian Orthodox Church. He addressed Afewerk Tekle, an Ethiopian laureate, when he left for Europe to gain skills to improve Ethiopian art. Later, Tekle created multiple artworks putting Ethiopian life on display. Selassie created an art program which enrolled multiple artists, including Agegnehu Engida. He gave a scholarship to Ale Felege Selam. Selassie travelled regularly to Bishoftu to see displays of paintings by Ethiopian artists such as Lemma Guya. Selassie was impressed by Guya's paintings of Ethiopian military aircraft. Guya later joined the Airforce but continued to paint with Selassie's support.

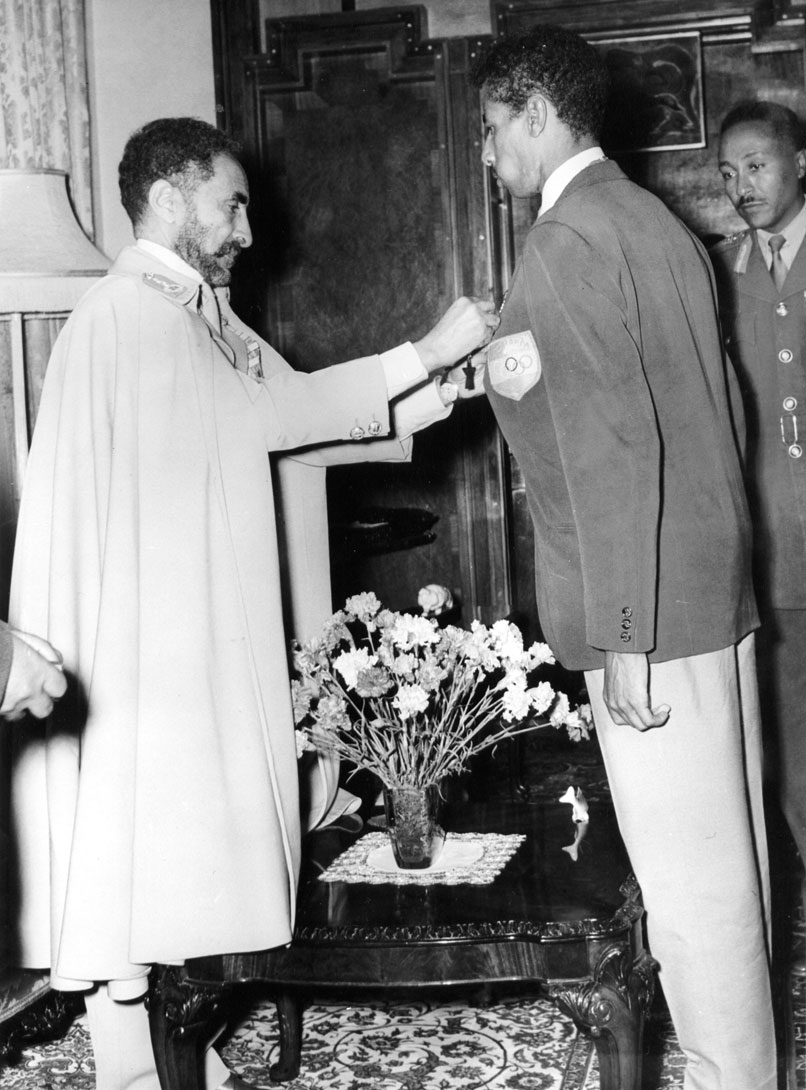
Awarding Abebe Bikila the Order of the Star of Ethiopia, 1960, after winning the Olympic Gold Medal

Selassie commissioned the opening of Ethiopia's first Hager Fikir Theater House in 1935 and the National Theatre in Addis Ababa in 1955.

Selassie wrote an autobiography, "My Life and Ethiopia's Progress", covering his years as ruler. He began the first volume while in exile during the Second Italo-Ethiopian War. He allegedly wrote the second volume towards the end of the war, though it is widely believed that officials assembled the materials and constructed the book.

=== Sports ===
During his reign, Selassie expanded international Ethiopian sports, including the Ethiopian Football Federation and Ethiopian national basketball team. He awarded Ethiopia the AFCON award when it won its first title. He supported Ethiopia in the 1960 Olympics and gave Olympian Abebe Bikila with multiple national awards such as the Star of Ethiopia and the Order of Menelik II. He supported other Ethiopian athletes, such as Mamo Wolde, by writing personal letters to them.

=== Religion ===
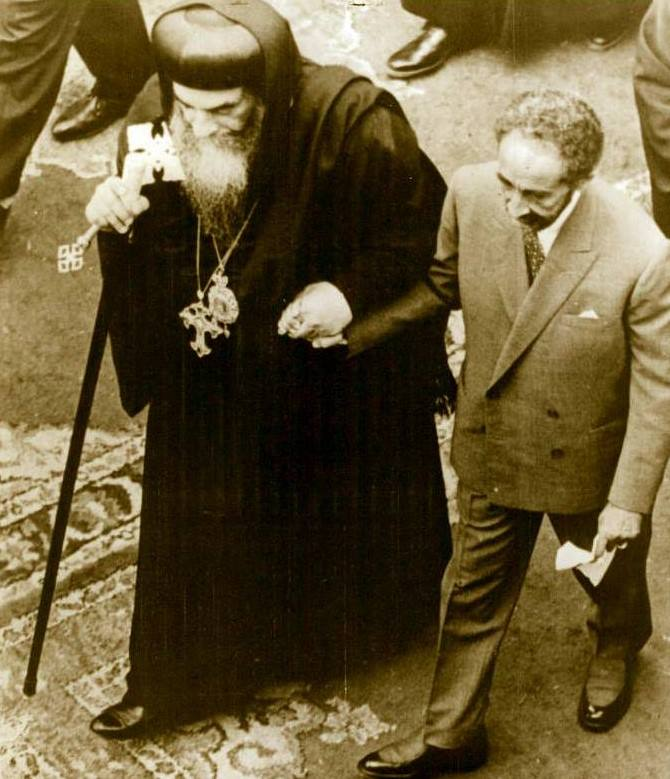
With Pope Cyril VI of Alexandria

Selassie was an adherent of the Ethiopian Orthodox Tewahedo Church. He was raised following Ethiopia's traditional Christian background. He was born Tafari Makonnen; after his coronation, he adopted his baptismal name as his official and legal name. He participated in the 1966 Berlin Congress for World Evangelism organised by evangelist Billy Graham.

He tried to unify the Oriental Orthodox community extending into Egypt, Armenia, and Syria. Despite this, he did not try to stop the Ethiopian Orthodox Tewahedo Church from having its own Patriarch when it was granted autocephaly by the Egyptian Coptic Church. He adhered to the intracontinental and overseas relations between the Orthodox churches, and believed that it would be reasonable to try to move unification forward. He maintained a good relationship with Pope Cyril VI of Alexandria, Patriarch of the Coptic Church in Egypt. Pope Cyril was awarded the Star of Solomon by Selassie for his role in nominating Abuna Basilios as the first Ethiopian Patriarch of the Tewahedo Church. Christianity played an official role in the Constitutional Monarchy, but to a limited degree compared to his predecessors. Under Selassie's reign in 1942, Islamic courts were allowed to have judicial power concerning Muslim matters. He also recognized concerns from the Muslim community and gave audiences to its respective leaders.

=== Family ===
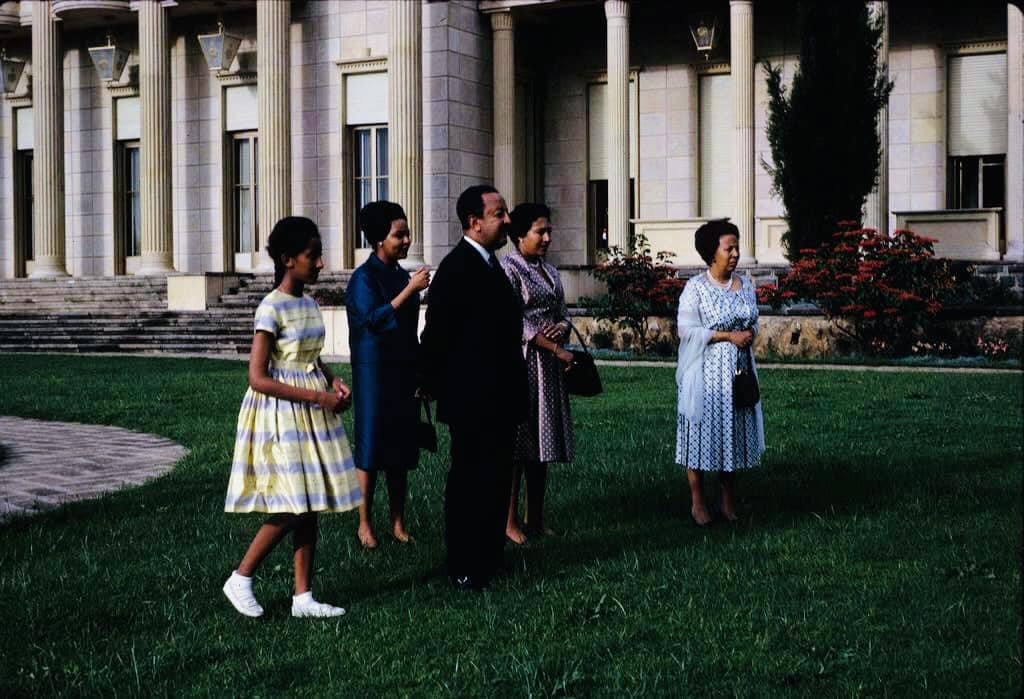
His son Prince Asfaw Wossen and other members of the Royal Family of Ethiopia

Selassie, being the head of the Royal Family, legally had precedent over all matters within his household. He contrasted with the Solomonic dynasty and gave more political powers, dukedoms, and government offices to members of his immediate family, including his grandson Rear Admiral Iskinder Desta. An individual source according to Paulos Milkias, a professor at Montreal, Canada, claimed that Desta threatened his grandfather with death at gunpoint unless he changed the successional line (although this was never definitively confirmed). Selassie only wanted to give him an apolitical position as a commissioned officer in the Ethiopian military, and Iskinder was made deputy commander of the Imperial Ethiopian Navy in 1958.

In 1963, Prince Philip, Duke of Edinburgh is said to have helped Haile Selassie to put his grandson in the elite Gordonstoun school. Selassie was able to put his other grandchildren into top schools throughout the U.S. and Europe, such as Columbia University.

== Legacy ==
=== Public opinion and media depiction ===
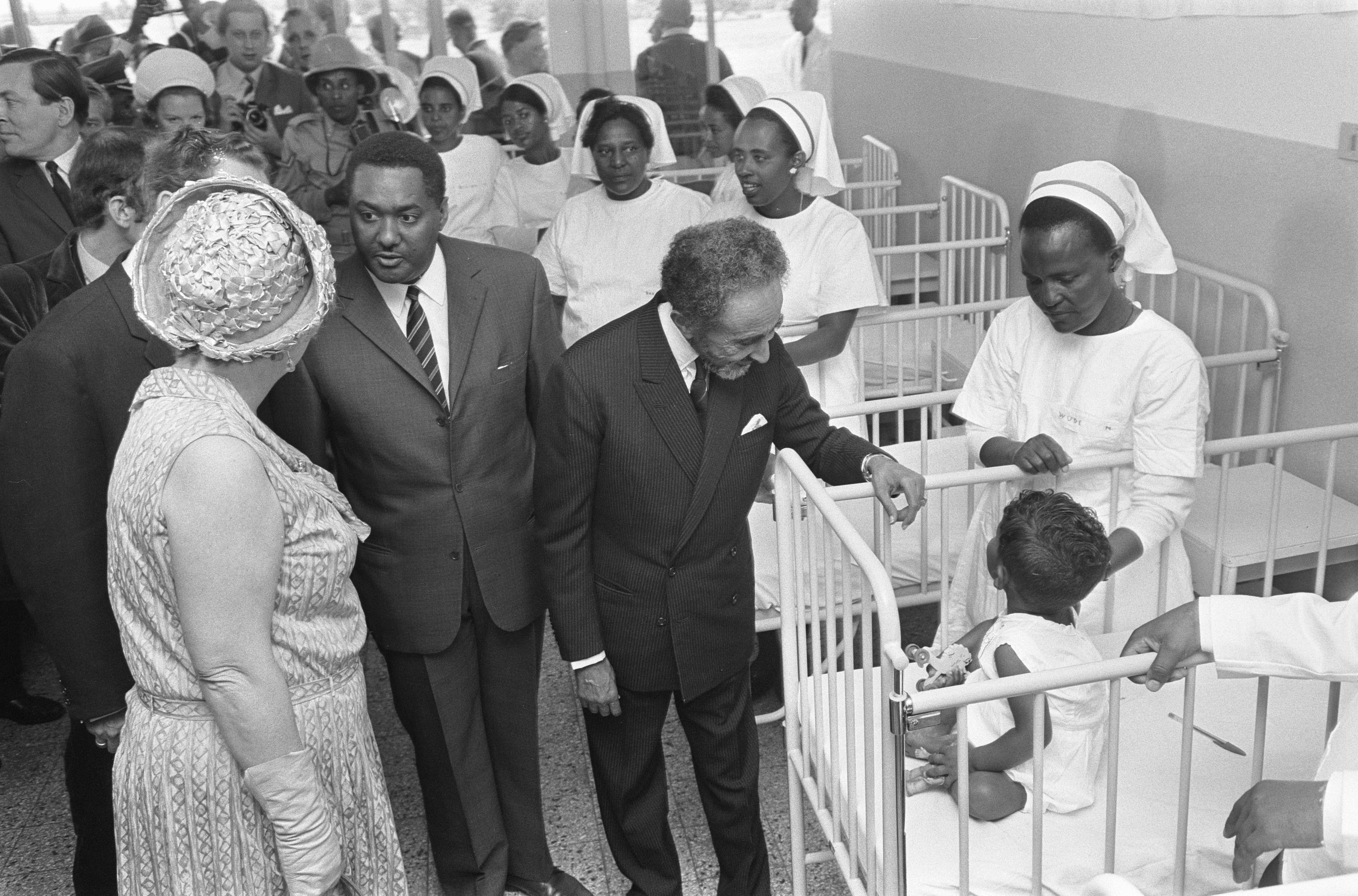
Haile Selassie I visiting a children's hospital in 1969, with Queen Juliana of the Netherlands, on her state visit to Ethiopia

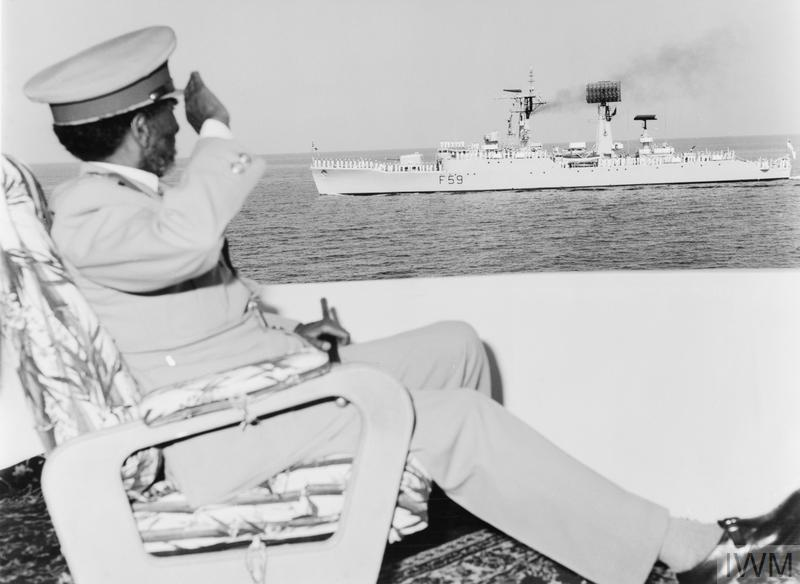
Emperor Haile Selassie I saluting Soviet, American, British, and French ships present at the annual Ethiopian Navy Day celebrations

During the early years of his reign, especially in the 1930s and 1940s when Fascist Italy invaded Ethiopia, media coverage of Selassie was predominantly positive. He was portrayed as a hero resisting fascist forces and a symbol of hope for Africa, aligning with the Allies during World War II. In 1935, during the invasion, he was even named Time magazine's "Man of the Year". British Pathé reported that Selassie's return was "As an Emperor returns and triumphs to his people." During one of his interviews with Meet the Press during a 1963 state visit to the U.S., a time when the Civil Rights movement was in full swing, Selassie condemned race-based oppression and advocated for Pan-African unity. However, media responses were mixed. NBC News ridiculed the visit months later, prompting The New York Times to defend the Ethiopian Emperor, questioning NBC's intent and criticizing its insensitivity. The paper remarked that "NBC News cannot afford to be a handmaiden of the State Department" and asked what "civilized purpose" was served by ridiculing the visit, to the probable embarrassment of Ethiopian diplomats in the U.S.

During the 1950s, when the Silver Jubilee of the Emperor's reign was celebrated, he adopted the 1955 Constitution which legally gave more democratic rights to the public, and legally restricted the monarch's power. Following the end of World War II, Selassie sought to limit the influence of the Ethiopian Orthodox Tewahedo Church. During the 1950s, he was widely regarded as a modernizing and capable leader in Ethiopia. In the 1970s, due to economic turmoil and a famine, Selassie's reputation suffered. Mass protests broke out against his reign. It was widely believed he should abdicate because of his old age and the failure of his land reform policy. These factors ultimately led to his removal from power.

Selassie's legacy remains a topic of debate. He played a leading role in founding Addis Ababa University and the Organisation of African Unity, the latter of which would later become the African Union. He was also a prominent anti-colonial leader. Time magazine listed him among the most important figures in political history, placing him in the "Top 25 Political Icons" of all time.

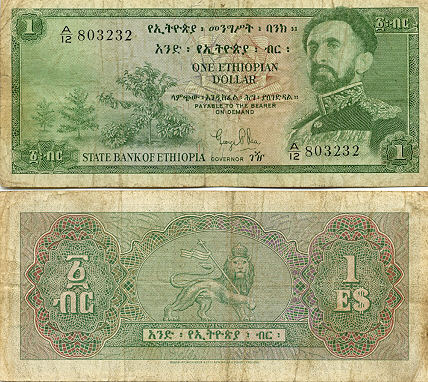
Old Ethiopian Birr depicting Haile Selassie over bank notes rarely circulating in Ethiopia

In 1997, Selassie was mentioned in the Ween song Mutilated Lips. In 2001, Ethiopian pop star Teddy Afro released a song titled "Haile Selassie", depicting its namesake in a nationalistic light.

Selassie appears as a leader of Ethiopia in Civilization V: Gods and Kings.

In 2021, a false headline had circulated of Queen Elizabeth II and Prince Philip bowing down to Selassie and his wife during the Queen's state visit to Ethiopia at Jubilee Palace. A documentary titled Grandpa Was an Emperor was released by Selassie's great-granddaughter (Emebet Yeshi Kassa) in 2021, showcasing the life of the Ethiopian royal family. In the 2024 biopic Bob Marley: One Love, Selassie is depicted in Rastafarian religious lore. There is a part where Selassie, whilst riding a horse, takes alongside him a young Bob Marley.

Selassie has been depicted by photographers, artists, and sculptors such as Edward Copnall, Beulah Woodard, Jacob Epstein, William H. Johnson, Yevonde Middleton and Alvin Gittins.

=== Memorials ===
Multiple memorials were built for Selassie, mainly in Ethiopia. One of these memorials was unveiled in 2019 at the African Union's Headquarters in Addis Ababa. This memorial was made to honor his long efforts of Pan-Africanism and anti-colonialism during his rule. A wax statue of Haile Selassie can be found in Addis Ababa's Unity Park. A high school in Kingston, Jamaica is named after Haile Selassie. In 2020, a bust statue built in 1957 was destroyed by protestors as a response to the assassination of Oromo singer Hachalu Hundessa. One of the three major expressways in Nairobi, Kenya is named after Haile Selassie.

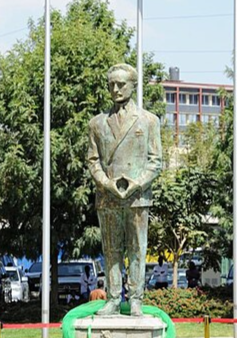
Haile Selassie I's statue located at the AU Conference HQ, Addis Ababa

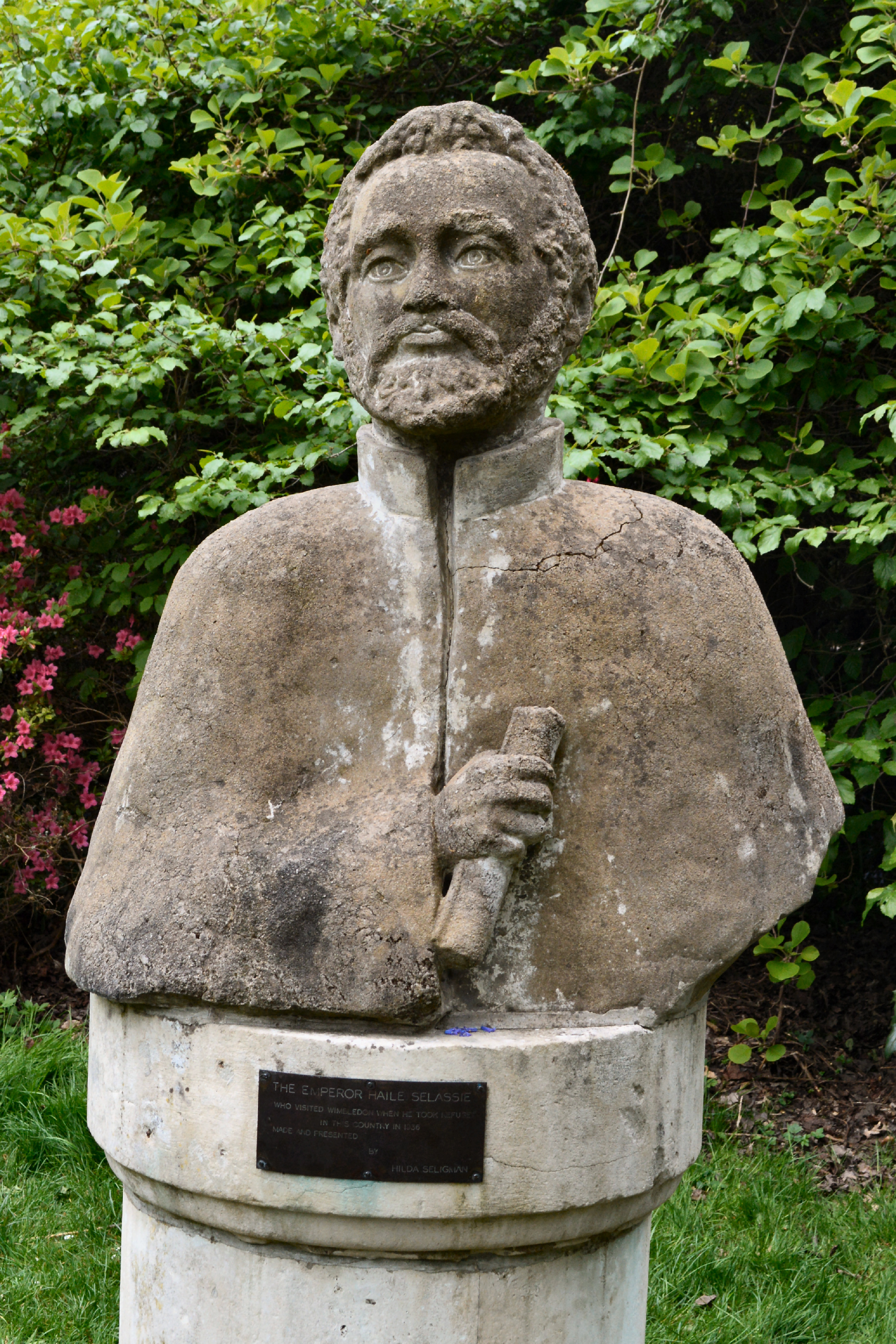
Former standing statue of the Emperor in Wimbledon, England

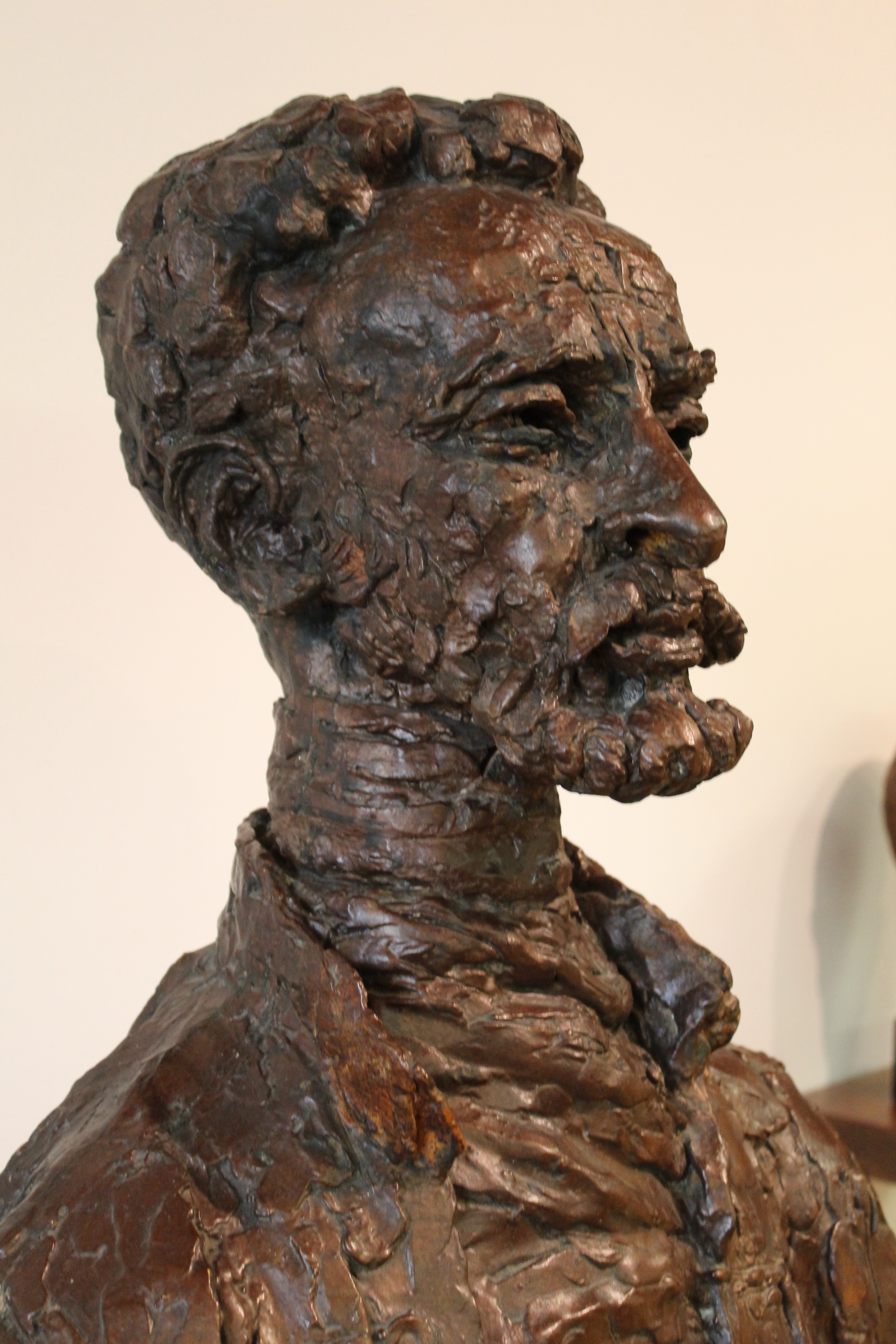
A plaster figure of Selassie by Jacob Epstein in 1936, The New Art Gallery Walsall, England

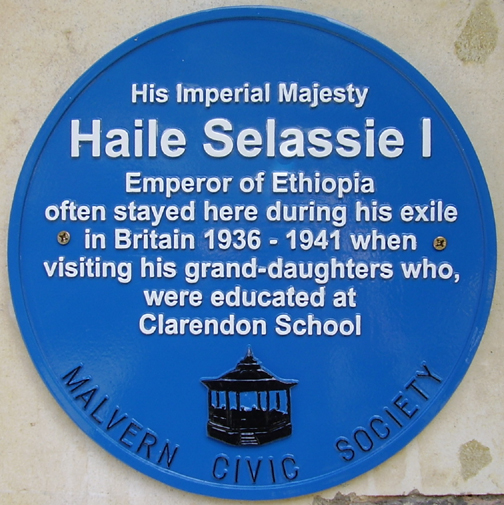
A blue plaque, unveiled in 2011 in Great Malvern, England

== Titles, styles, arms, and honours ==
Styles of Haile Selassie I of Ethiopia
- Reference style: His Imperial Majesty; Amharic: ግርማዊ; girmāwī
- Spoken style: Your Imperial Majesty; Amharic: ጃንሆይ; djānhoi; lit. "O [esteemed] royal"
- Alternative style: Our Lord (familiar); Amharic: ጌቶቹ; getochu; lit. "Our master" (pl.)

- 23 July 1892 – 1 November 1905: Lij Tafari Makonnen
- 1 November 1905 – 11 February 1917: Dejazmach Tafari Makonnen
- 11 February 1917 – 7 October 1928: Balemulu Silt'an Enderase Le'ul-Ras Tafari Makonnen
- 7 October 1928 – 2 November 1930: Negus Tafari Makonnen
- 2 November 1930 – 12 September 1974: By the Conquering Lion of the Tribe of Judah, His Imperial Majesty Haile Selassie I, King of Kings, Lord of Lords, Elect of God.

=== National orders ===
- Chief Commander of the Order of the Star of Ethiopia (1909)
- Grand Collar of the Order of Solomon (1930)
- Grand Cordon of the Order of the Seal of Solomon
- Grand Cordon with Collar of the Order of the Queen of Sheba
- Grand Cordon of the Order of the Holy Trinity
- Grand Cordon of the Order of Menelik II
- Order of Fidelity

Defender of the Faith Haile Selassie I
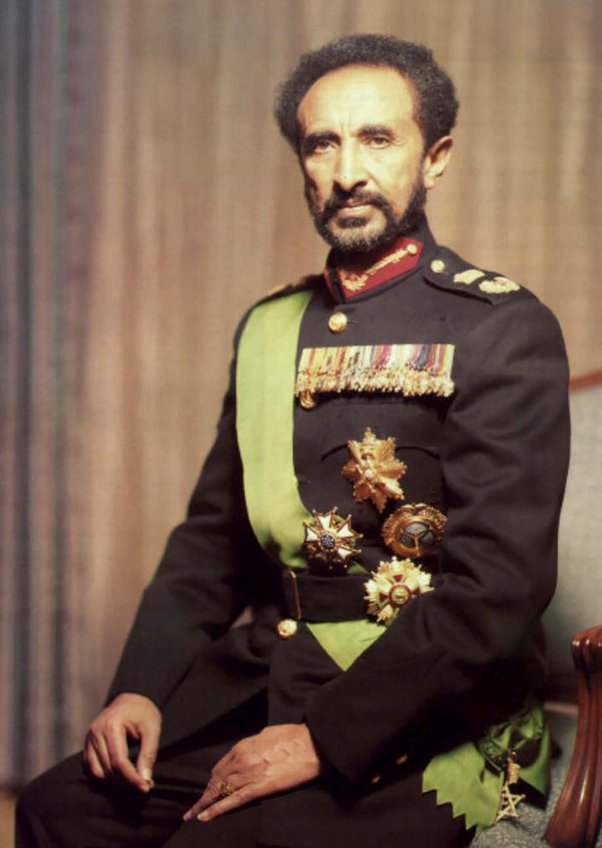

Emperor
- Resting place: Addis Ababa
- Venerated in: Oriental Orthodoxy: Armenian Apostolic Church; Ethiopian Orthodox Tewahedo Church; Coptic Orthodox Church; Indian Orthodox Church; Syriac Orthodox Church

=== As sovereign ===
Imperial Royal Standard for Haile Selassie I obverse

Imperial Royal Standard for Haile Selassie I reverse

=== Foreign Coat of Arms ===
Coat of arms in Spain under the order of Charles III of Spain

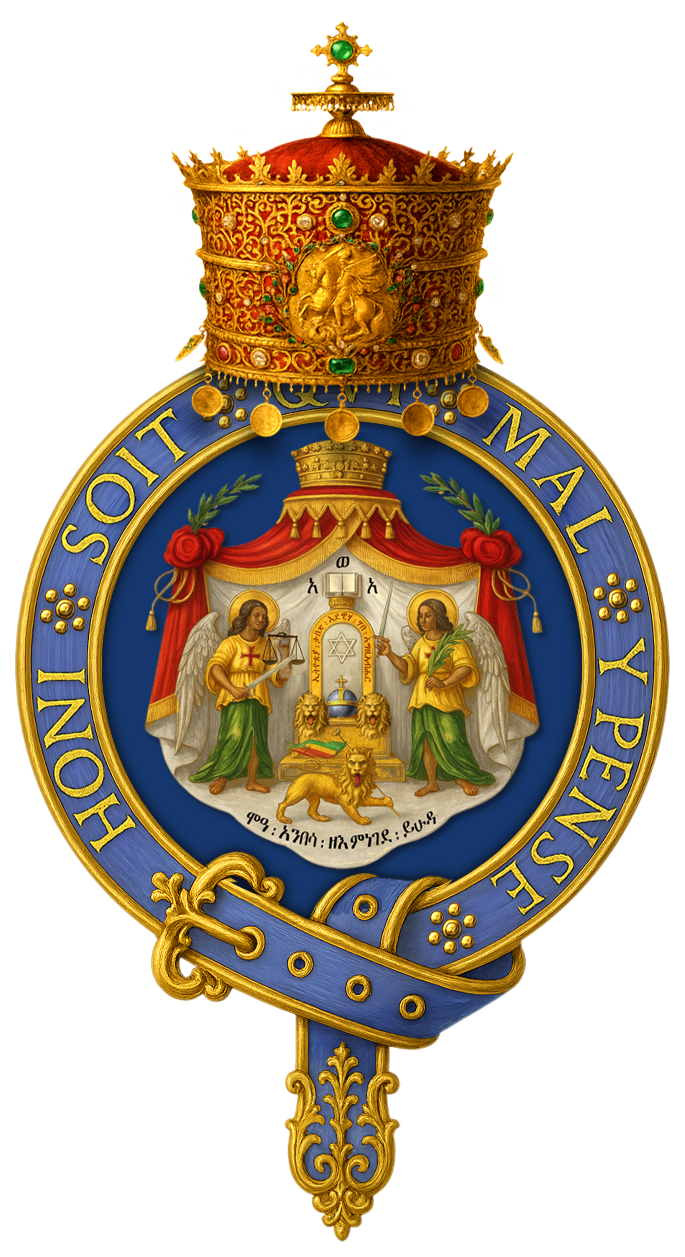
Coat of arms as Emperor in the United Kingdom under the Order of Garter

Coat of arms as Emperor in Sweden under the Order of the Seraphim

== Military ranks ==
Selassie held the following ranks:

- Field Marshal, Imperial Ethiopian Army
- Admiral of the Fleet, Imperial Ethiopian Navy
- Marshal of the Imperial Ethiopian Air Force
- Honorary Field Marshal, British Army, 20 January 1965

== Issue ==
Name	Birth	Death	Notes
Princess Romanework	1909	14 October 1940	Married Dejazmatch Beyene Merid in the late 1920s, had four children. Dejazmatch Beyene Merid died in 1937.
Princess Tenagnework	12 January 1912	6 April 2003	Married from 1924 to 1937 (death) to Ras Desta Damtew, had six children. Remarried to Andargachew Messai, who died in 1981, had two children.
Crown Prince Amha Selassie	27 July 1916	17 January 1997	Married Wolete Israel Seyoum in 1931, had one daughter. Amha and Wolete later divorced. Married Medferiashwork Abebe in 1945, had four children.
Princess Zenebework	25 July 1917	24 March 1934	Married Dejazmach Haile Selassie Gugsa, no issue
Princess Tsehai	13 October 1919	17 August 1942	Married Lij Abiye Abebe in 1941, had a stillborn daughter
Prince Makonnen, Duke of Harar	16 October 1924	13 May 1957	Married Sara Gizaw, had five children
Prince Sahle Selassie	27 February 1932	24 April 1962	Married Princess Mahisente Habte Mariam, had one son

== Ancestry ==
Ancestors of Haile Selassie

8. Dejazmach Wolde Malakot Yamana Krestos
4. Dejazmach Wolde Mikael Wolde Malakot Yamana Krestos
9. Woizero Kalama Worq
2. Ras Mäkonnen Wäldä-Mika'él Wolde Malakot Yamana Krestos
10. Negus (King) Sahle Selassie
5. Immabet Tenagnework Sahle Selassie
11. Woizero Yimegnushal Ayele
1. Haile Selassie I of Ethiopia
6. Dejazmach Ali Abba Jifar of Woreilu
3. Woizero Yeshimebet Ali Abba Jifar
14. Ato Yimeru of Gurage
7. Immabet-Hoy Walatta Ihata Giyorgis Yimeru
15. Woizero Araza-Aregai

Family of Haile Selassie
(Note: This family tree only includes the historical figures' paternal ancestries)

Legend
EMPEROR (bold, capital letters)

Marriage

Descent

Uncertain/purported/legendary descent

HOUSE OF DAVID
SOLOMON; King of Israel	MAKEDA; Queen of Sheba
MENELIK I Legendary first emperor
KINGS OF AXUM (mostly legendary genealogy)
DIL NA'OD; Last King of Axum
MARA TAKLA; HAYMANOT (1)	Masoba Warq	Mkhbara Widam (Mahbere-Widam)
ZAGWE DYNASTY
TATADIM (2)	JAN SEYUM (3)	GERMA SEYUM (4)	Agba Seyun (Yakob)
KEDUS HARBE (6)	GEBRE MESQEL; LALIBELA (7)	YEMREHANA; KRESTOS (5)	Sinfa Ar'ad
NA'AKUETO LA'AB (8)	YETBARAK (9)	Negus Zaré
Asfiha
Yakob
Bahr Seggad
Zagwe dynasty	Adam Asgad (Widma Asgad)
Tasfa Iyasus
YEKUNO AMLAK; 1270–1285
SOLOMONIC; DYNASTY
Yagbe'u Seyon (SALOMON I); 1285–1294	WEDEM ARAD; 1299–1314	Prince; Qidma Seggada
SENFA ARED IV; 1294–1295	HEZBA ASGAD; 1295–1296	QEDMA ASGAD; 1296–1297	JIN ASGAD; 1297–1298	SABA ASGAD; 1298–1299	AMDA SEYON I 1314–1344
NEWAYA KRESTOS; 1344–1372
DAWIT I 1382–1413	NEWAYA MARYAM; 1372–1382
TEWODROS I 1413–1414	YESHAQ I 1414–1429	TAKLA MARYAM; 1430–1433	ZARA YAQOB; 1434–1468
ANDREYAS; 1429–1430	SARWE IYASUS; 1433	AMDA IYASUS; 1433–1434	BAEDA MARYAM I 1468–1478
ESKENDER; 1478–1494	NA'OD; 1494–1507
AMDA SEYON II; 1494	DAWIT II; 1507–1540
GELAWDEWOS; 1540–1559	MENAS; 1559–1563	Prince Yakob
SOLOMONIC; DYNASTY; GONDAR BRANCH	SOLOMONIC; DYNASTY; SHEWA BRANCH
SARSA DENGEL; 1563–1597	Prince; Lesana Krestos	Prince Fasilidas	Prince; Segwa Qal
YAQOB; 1597–1603; 1604–1606	ZA DENGEL; 1603–1604	SUSENYOS I 1606–1632	Warada Qal
FASILIDES; 1632–1667	Lebsa Qal
YOHANNES I 1667–1682	Negasi Krestos; Ruler of Shewa
Princess Amlakawit	IYASU I 1682–1706	TEWOFLOS; 1708–1711	Sebestyanos; Ruler of Shewa
Delba Iyasus; Dejazmatch of Tigray	TEKLE HAYMANOT I 1706–1708	BAKAFFA; 1721–1730	DAWIT III; 1716–1721	YOHANNES II; 1769	Qedami Qal; Ruler of Shewa
YOSTOS; 1711–1716	IYASU II; 1730–1755	TEKLE; HAYMANOT II; 1769–1770; 1770–1777	TEKLE GIYORGIS I 1779–1784; 1788–1789; 1794–1795; 1795–1796; 1798–1799; 1800	Amha Iyasus; Ruler of Shewa
Prince Adigo	Prince Atsequ	IYOAS I 1755–1769	HEZQEYAS; 1789–1794	SALOMON III; 1796–1797; 1799	YOHANNES III; 1840–1841; 1845; 1850–1851	Asfa Wossen; Ruler of Shewa
SALOMON II; 1777–1779	IYASU III; 1784–1788	EGWALE SEYON; 1801–1818	IYOAS II; 1818–1821	IYASU IV; 1830–1832	Unascertainable claims of descent from Fasilides (intermediate generations omitted)	Wossen Seged; Ruler of Shewa
(alleged sons of Iyasu II)
BAEDA MARYAM II; 1795	SUSENYOS II; 1770	GIGAR; 1821–1826; 1826–1830	YONAS; 1797–1798	Gabre Masai	DEMETROS; 1799–1800; 1800–1801
GEBRE KRESTOS; 1832	SAHLE DENGEL; 1832–1840; 1841–1845; 1845–1850; 1851–1855	Sahle Selassie; Ruler of Shewa
BAEDA MARYAM III (1826) (unknown parentage)	YOHANNES; DYNASTY	TEWODROS; DYNASTY
Mirtcha Wolde Kidane; Shum of Tembien	TEWODROS II; 1855–1868	Haile Melekot; Ruler of Shewa	Princess; Tenagnework
ZAGWE DYNASTY (RESTORED)
TEKLE GIYORGIS II; 1868–1872	Empress Dinqinesh	YOHANNES IV; 1872–1889	Woizero Altash	MENELIK II; 1889–1913	Other wives	Ras Makonnen; Governor of Harar
Araya Selassie; King of Tigray	ZEWDITU; 1916–1930	Princess; Shoagarad	HAILE SELASSIE; 1930–1974
LIJ IYASU; 1913–1916 designated but uncrowned Emperor of Ethiopia	AMHA SELASSIE; 1989–1997; Crown Prince; Titular Emperor
ZERA YACOB; 1997–present Crown Prince; Titular Emperor

== See also ==
- Solomonic Dynasty
- Ethiopian Orthodox Tewahedo Church
- Black Lions
- Ethiopian Empire
- Emperor of Ethiopia
- List of Emperors of Ethiopia
- List of people who have been considered deities

== Notes ==
Haile Selassie House of Solomon Born: 23 July 1892 Died: 27 August 1975
Regnal titles
Preceded by Zewditu I	Emperor of Ethiopia; 2 November 1930 – 12 September 1974	Monarchy abolished
Titles in pretence
Loss of title Communist take-over	— TITULAR — Emperor of Ethiopia; 12 September 1974 – 27 August 1975	Succeeded by Crown Prince Amha Selassie
