= Gebre Tasfa =

Ethiopian governor (died 1815)

Gebre Tasfa (Note: In various sources also spelled as Gabre Tasfa) better known as Gebre of Semien (Gabriel of Semien) (Note: Cognate equivalent: Gabriel Also spelled in sources as: Guebra of Samen Gebru) (died May 1815) was the governor of Semien, Tsegede, Welkait and Wogera during the late 18th and early 19th century in Ethiopia. He held the title of Ras, and had an unusually long reign spanning 44 years during the tumultuous Zemene Mesafint when lords of each province and district continuously fought each other for supremacy. Ras Gebre was the primary backer of his son-in-law Emperor Tekle Giyorgis I claims to the throne.

== Ancestry ==
Gebre's family originated from the Semien mountains and belonged to the Amhara people. Ras Gebre's forebears, relatives and descendants even claimed Solomonic genealogy through a daughter of Emperor Susenyos.

Gebre was the son of Tasfa of Semien, his name was romanized as Tesfos of Samen in contemporary 18th century writings by James Bruce. Dejazmach Tasfa governed Semien Province and was loyal to Emperor Iyasu II. He fought valiantly during the three battles of Sarbakusa in May 1771 and played a crucial role in ending Mikael Sehul's short-lived influence over Gondar, after which Tasfa succumbed to his injuries.

His brother was Dejazmach Eraklis Tasfa (Note: Also spelled in sources as: Eraklis Tesfa, Eraklis of Semyen and Errocklis) his daughter was Setchen Eraklis, the first wife of Ras Wolde Selassie of Tigray.

Another brother was Dejazmach Wolde Eyob (Note: Also spelled in sources as: Welled Eyut); the governor of Segonet.

According to Nathaniel Pearce's journal, Ras Gebre was a follower of the catholic faith. However, in the same journal Pearce observed that Gebre also participated in Orthodox Christian holy days such as Meskel. His successors, Haile Maryam Gebre and Wube Haile Maryam were Orthodox Christians.

== Governor 1771-1815 ==
=== Dynastic marriage ===
In 1783 Dejazmach Gebre allowed the matrimony between his daughter Teshen Gebre and Emperor Tekle Giyorgis I (the last emperor until the advent of Tewodros II to wield his own authority) in a bid to undermine the growing Yejiu influence in Gondar. Tekle Giyorgis I relations with Ali I of Yejju soured after signs of independence on the part of the Emperor. Ali I fearful for his position and in the absence of Gebre, attacked and deposed the Emperor and had put Iyasu III on the throne. Tekle Giyorgis escaped to Semien, his father-in-law domain. Gebre would assist his son-in-law several times back to the throne.

=== 1789 ===
In 1789, Gebre gave refuge to Tekle Haymanot, one of the candidates nominated for Emperor who had fled Gondar following clashes with a rival faction led by Ras Ali I. As such in 1789 there were five puppet nominees for Emperor in Abyssinia (Atse Baeda Maryam, Ba'ala Segad, Iyasu III, Tekle Giyorgis I and Tekle Haymanot) each backed by powerful rival lords.

=== Ras Gebre ===
In September 1793, Emperor Hezqeyas distinguished Gebre Tasfa's rank and title from dejazmach to Ras, with the peculair side note, that this promotion occurred in the absence of the nominee, who was in his native Semien. Emperor Hezqeyas like his contemporary Gondarine rulers during the Zemene Mesafint were uneasy with their dependent positions on powerful lords, and as counterbalance sought support from other lords such as Gebre.

=== Kingmakers war ===
For the third time Tekle Giyorgis I was deposed as Emperor; on that occasion by Baeda Maryam II son of puppet Emperor Salomon II (r.1777-1779). Baeda Maryam II secured the support of Dejazmach Walda Gabre’el of Lasta, and took Gondar while Emperor Tekle Giyorgis I was in Sawre (Note: Sawre is near Jan Amora in Semien Province.) on a campaign north of the capital. Baeda Maryam II was enthroned Emperor on 18 May 1795. Walda Gabre'el of Lasta was elevated to Ras Bitwoded (highest ranked Ras).

Baeda Maryam II immediately set out to wage war against Ras Gebre, Tekle Giyorgis I supporter and father-in-law. Ras Gebre defeated Baeda Maryam II and Walda Gabre’el's armies in the Battle of Mount Mosabit near Sawada.

Another supporter of Emperor Baeda Maryam II turned up in the person of Ras Wolde Selassie of Tigray. Ras Gebre and his main army was still encamped in Sawada, when he received the news that Semien has been invaded by the Tigrayans, and laid waste to Segonet, Bagele, Hay and Tassan.

Ras Gebre and Ras Wolde Selassie eventually reconciled, with the latter visiting Inchetkaub the capital of Semien, and presented Ras Gebre with gifts in Emperor Tekle Giyorgis I presence. Baeda Maryam II with no powerful lords behind him aside from Walda Gabre’el of Lasta (who lost against Hailu Wand Bewossen of Lasta) was eventually sidelined. Tekle Giyorgis I regained the throne for the fourth time in December 1795.

=== Death of Abuna Yosef and war with Gugsa ===
In 1803, Abba Yosef the Abuna died, and Ras Gugsa of Yejju did the disgraceful act of pillaging the late patriarch's house and carried off with gold and valuables to the amount of five hundred wakeas (Note: Wakeas is also spelled as Waqet in various sources. A Wakeas was a unit of measurement and was often coin based, primarily for gold. Though of relative precision, there were variations of weight, One waqet of gold was weighted between 27 and 35 gram depending on location and era. After the introduction of Maria Theresa thaler, a waqet was weighted at 28.3 gram, equivalent to an ounce.) of gold, pretending they were church property and not the personal possessions of the dead ecclesiastic. Ras Gugsa was forced to disgorge the stolen valuables after Ras Wolde Selassie and Ras Gebre threatened to wage war for which Gugsa was unprepared.

Gugsa's pride, however, had received too severe a mortification to acquiesce what had taken place. He made preparations to wage wars against those who had humiliated him, and forged an alliance with Siban, son of Kollase of Michaelis, who was at the head of the Yejju Oromos. This united force was reported to be able to bring into the field thirty thousand cavalry, besides double that number of spearmen.

Gugsa's allied forces commenced its operations by an attack upon Ras Gebre, in his province of Semien. At the time of Henry Salt's writing, Ras Gebre was besieged in his mountain fortress Geshen-hai. Ras Gebre was said to have one thousand matchlocks in his army, with which he held out against Gugsa's coalition forces.

=== Englishmen on the run, audience with Gebre ===
According to contemporary traveller Henry Salt writings, his colleague and erstwhile fugitive Nathaniel Pearce sought sanctuary in Semien. The evening of 15 October 1807 brought him to Segonet, one of the principal towns in Semien, where he was received with attention by the governor Wolde Eyob, to whom he communicated his story, and in consequence Wolde Eyob after two days gave Pearce a letter of introduction to his brother Gebre, Ras of Semien. (Note: Gebre is spelled in its cognate equivalent Gabriel in Henry Salt's writings.), and sent a guide to help him on his way to Inchetkaub.

On the 18th of October 1807 Pearce and his travel companions reached Inchetkaub, where they sat down, according to custom, at the gate of Ras Gebre's mansion, and in less than an hour servants came and led the travellers to a hut, where they were provided with bread, meat and beverage.

Pearce was granted audience by Ras Gebre on the 19th of October 1807. When he entered the mansion the Ras was seated on his couch, surrounded by priests; A description of Ras Gebre by Pearce was as following;

a tall fine-looking man, about forty years of age (Note: Exact age couldn't be determined. However, given the longevity of his reign as governor, he was likely well over fifty years of age during his meeting with Pearce in 1807.), of a dark complexion, having a Roman nose, open features, and a remarkably strong expression in his eye.

Pearce told his whole story to Ras Gebre, stating his causes of complaint against Ras Wolde Selassie whose behaviour made the Englishmen to flee Tigray, and declared his wish to proceed to Gondar, and to enter into the service of Zewde (Note: Spelled as Zoldi in the source.) of Gojjam, or some other chiefs in Amhara.

On 21 October 1807 Pearce was admitted to a second audience, and found Ras Gebre's again encircled by priests. Pearce took note of Ras Gebre's piety, who was well versed in the scriptures.

Pearce recuperated in Inchetkaub for some time after a medical condition in his eyes took a turn for the worse. In December 1807, the medical disorder abated. Ras Gebre persuaded Pearce to return to Antalo, as Ras Gebre sought to mediate the quarrel between Pearce and Ras Wolde Selassie. Pearce took leave of Ras Gebre, for whom he entertained a great respect, and in return, the Ras, who enjoyed Pearce's company presented the Englishmen with some parting gifts, a mule, a quantity of powder and ball, and five wakeas of gold, and sent him with one of his confidential messengers, to speak in Pearce's favour to Ras Wolde Selassie.

== Death ==
On May 5, 1815, Ras Gebre death reached across regions and the date was documented in the journal of traveller Nathaniel Pearce; who wrote that Ras Gebre's death appeared much grieved.

He was succeeded by his son Haile Maryam Gebre in 1815.

=== Taytu's chronicle ===
Gebre is mentioned in his great-granddaughter's chronicle; Empress Taytu Betul, the spouse of Emperor Menelik II. The chronicler ensures Taytu's posterity will known that she descended from Susenyos (thus of Solomonic heritage) through Gebre's Semien line. The chronicle describes the longevity of his reign (of 44 years), the relative prosperity of Semien by making the shankella (a term for Sudanic tribes near the Ethiopian borderlands in the lowland areas) pay in gold, and Gebre's generosity towards his subjects.

== Notable descendants ==
Gebre kept more than sixty women. However, his official wife was Woizero Sahlitu Kefle Iyesus (Note: Also spelled as Sahlitu Kifle Yesus). Sahlitu herself had Solomonic Amhara ancestry with her genealogy tracing back to 16th century monarch Dawit II, through his daughter Sabana Giyorgis, the wife of Ras Bitwoded Yona’el of Amhara.

His children include: Haile Maryam Gebre, his son and successor; Batri Gebre, another son; Teshen Gebre was his daughter, wife of Emperor Tekle Giyorgis I; Wube Haile Maryam was his famous grandson. Merso Haile Maryam was his grandson. Betul Haile Maryam was his grandson. Yewub-dar Haile Maryam was his granddaughter. Taytu Betul was his great-granddaughter.

- Dagnew Wolde Selassie was the great, great-grandson of Wube Haile Maryam. A former Ethiopian Ambassador to Yemen, and former governor of Begemder.
