= Enderta Province =

Former province in northern Ethiopia

Enderta or Inderta (Ge'ez: እንደርታ) is a former historical province of Ethiopia; it is located in the eastern edge of the Tigray highlands. Enderta is bordered on the west by Tembien, on the south and southwest by Lasta and Wag, on the east by denkel (southern Red Sea region of Eritrea), and on the north by Agame and Adwa. Mekelle was formerly the capital of the province. Enderta's local administration of Denkel/Afar up to the edges of Aseb under its jurisdiction seems to have been highly, interlinked with the operation of the salt trade and its taxation system; the entire tasks of salt caravan organization being the responsibility of the bäalgada, title assumed by the governor of Endärta, since at least the Medieval period.

Notable Bea'al gadas included the mighty Ras Robel, grandfather of Emperor Sertse-Dengel as well as the paternal ancestor of Ras Suhul Mikael, Ras Faris the great, Ras Woldeselassie the great and Ras Araya Dimtsu, maternal uncle of Emperor Yohaness.

Historically, the province of Enderta had been ruled by its own hereditary governors, at least, since the restoration of the solomonic dynasty in 1270. Starting in 1855 and beginning with Ras Araya dimtsu of Enderta his immediate relations and descendants known collectively as Enderta Mesafint would rule the Tigrinya speaking provinces for more than 120 years until the down fall of the Ethiopian monarchy in 1974 from their capitals in Antalo first then from Mekelle both in Enderta; the last of these Enderta Mesafint being Ras Mengesha Seyoum, thus, making Enderta the center of power where important political, economical as well as governmental decisions were made for more than 120 years within Tigray.

== Capital ==
Hintalo (also known as Antalo) had originally been Enderta's capital city; it is located on a high plateau beneath the south face of Amba Aradam, making the town a natural fortress. Hintalo would remain for centuries as one of the most important cities in the empire of Abyssinia; However, when Emperor Yohannes IV moved his capital to Mek'ele, the political and social life for both the Tigray province as well as Enderta moved from Hintalo to Mek'ele instead. The hereditary chiefs of Enderta had their origins in Hintalo and it was from Hintalo that they ruled Enderta.

== History ==
=== Early history ===
After the fall of the Axumite empire some time in the late 9th century AD, the center of economical as well as political power shifted to the south, while the many provinces in the north were governed by the Tigray Mekonen based in Enderta. Before the restoration of the Solomonic dynasty, and during the time of the Zagwe dynasty, the chief of Enderta, Ingida Igzi, played a major role in supporting the Solomonids along with the chief priest of Aksum by the name of Tekeste Birhane; the two are listed among the most influential dignitires on the side of Yekuno Amlak. The province of Inderta/Enderta then began asserting its independence under the early Solomonic emperors, causing Emperor Amda Seyon to turn north and strengthen his control over areas that had gained more autonomy. During Yekuno Amlak's time Ingida Igzi was succeeded by his son, Tesfane Igzi; as governor of Enderta, Tesfane Igzi' had the most power among the northern provinces and held the title Hasgwa and Aqabé Tsentsen ('keeper of the fly whisks - an ancient Aksumite title) and threatened the Amhara-based lineage currently in power; as early as 1305, Tesfane Igzi' referred to Inderta as "his kingdom," his son and successor, Ya'ibika Igzi, did not even mention the Emperor Amda Seyon in his 1318/9 land grant. Ya'ibika Igzi among other things is credited for commissioning the writing and translation into Geez of one of the most distinguished books of Christian Ethiopia: Metsahafe kibre negist or " The book of the Glory of the Kings." Ya'ibika Igzi eventually rebelled, unsuccessfully inviting the governor of nearby Tembien to join him.^{[e]} Amda Seyon responded swiftly, killing the governor, dividing the titles, and awarding them to different individuals of lowly origin. The Emperor's appointees were unpopular, described as "men who were not born from Adam and Eve who were called Halestiyotat," a term literally meaning "bastard of mixed or low origins".

To consolidate his control in the region, Amda Seyon established a military colony of non Tigrayan troops at Amba Senayata, the center of the rebellion, and appointed his queen consort, Bilén Saba, as governor of Enderta, along with a new batch of officials below her. The Queen ruled indirectly however, which caused unrest in the province as the population heavily resented Amhara rule. This induced the Emperor to appoint one of his sons, Bahr Seged, as governor, who was later in 1328 also given control of the maritime provinces under the title of Ma'ikele Bahr ("Between the Rivers/Seas").

Enderta appears on indigenous maps of the northern Horn of Africa in the 15th century.

=== Notable men of Enderta of the 16th century ===
Abeto Rubel (Ras) and Bea'al gada, native of Selewea-Enderta, appointed as Tigray Mekkonen during the time of Emperor Minase (he was killed at Sambera Kware, 7 March 1529) he had a son, Abeto Aram Hedug, who is the father of Abeto Labasi, who fathered Abeto Wolde Hawaryat, who fathered Abeto Hezeqeyas [Isqias], who fathered H.H. Ra'asa ra'usan Mikael Sehul Isqias, Prince (Mesfin) of Tigray (s/o Ishate Mariam) 1748-1771 &1772-1779 H.H. Ra'asa ra'usan Mikael Sehul Isqias, Prince (Mesfin) of Tigray. b. ca. 1691, son of Abeto Hezeqeyas [Isqias] Wolde Hawaryot, by his wife, Woizero Ishate Mariam, daughter of Azzaz Yakub, educ. privately. A descendant of the mighty Ras Robel and Ras Faris the Great. Blattengeta to the Tigray Mekkonen, Ras Amda Haymanot, ca. 1720. Appointed as Dejazmatch of Tigray 20 September 1748 and of Semien 8 October 1757. Raised to the title of Ras and confirmed as Governor of Tigray, Semien, Seggada, Walqat and 44 other governments, 13 September 1759. Established his capital at Adowa. Invested as Ras Bitwodad and Enderase (Viceroy) of the Empire 22 January 1768. He died on 23 June 1779.

=== Zemene Mesafint ===
By the Zemene Mesafint, or Era of Princes (1769–1855), the province of Enderta assumed great prominence when its nobility ascended to power. The beginning of this period is set to the date Ras Mikael Sehul killed Emperor Iyoas (7 May 1769), Ras Suhul Michael after he was defeated by rebels at Sarbakusa in May 1771 however, he was chained, imprisoned for a year in Gondar and let go to Tigray. Upon hearing Michael's predicament, Dejazmach Kefla Yossous, the then hereditary governor of Enderta, challenged Michael for the over-lordship of Tigray and Merebmilash; in the ensuing battle Kefla Yossous was killed.

Wolde Selassie, the second son of Dejazmach Kefla Yessous was a young man. His brothers included Dejazmach Bilaten-Geta Mennase and Dejazmach Debbab who is the great-grandfather of Emperor Yohannes IV through his son Dejazmach Dimtsu Debbab who fathered Yohannese's mother Amate Selassie Dimtsu. Born in 1736 in Antalo Enderta, Wolde Selassie rose to prominence. He emerged as a heroic warrior after years of fighting; Nathaniel Pearce who lived with Ras Wolde Selasie for many years, describes an encounter where Wolde Selassie made a name for himself by single-handedly slaying the brothers Abel and Cail, "two of Ras Michael's choice men" who were sent by Michael to kill Wolde Selassie. Sehul Mikael was so impressed at Wolde Selassie's bravery he tried to make peace with him. However, Wolde Selassie remembered how the older man (Suhul Michael) had his father killed, and spent the years until the old Ras died in exile amongst the Wollo Oromo and in Gojjam. Upon the death of Michael, however, his grandson Wolde Gabriel succeeded the governorship, but was soon fiercely challenged by Kefla Yossous' son Wolde Selassie. Immediately, the two men went to war; Wolde Gabriel attempted to crush Wolde Selassie in Wogera, but according to Pearce, after besieging Wolde Selassie for 20 days Wolde Gabriel came off the worse and quickly made peace with Wolde Selassie by proclaiming him Balgadda or governor of the salt-making districts, but Wolde Selassie was aiming for the highest office in the land and when Wolde Gabriel was killed in a battle he waged against Ras Aligaz of Yejju, Wolde Selassie went after another powerful warlord of Tigray by the name of Ras Gebra Meskel.

The two fought many battles but Ras Gebra Meskel was on the losing side; this prompted Wolde Selassie to head for Gondar to claim the governorship of Enderta. When he petitioned the Emperor Tekle Giorgis for that office, the Emperor however, gave the position to Ras Gebra Meskel instead; this angered Wolde Selassie, and he soon quickly marched forth with a small army against Gebra Meskel. He defeated his troops, then entered Gebra Meskel's camp and took him prisoner. Wolde Selassie, after effectively clearing the way for the highest office for himself, headed back to Gondar and placed his claim to the throne. The two Emperors, Tekle Haymanot and Tekle Giyorgis, bestowed Wolde Selassie the titles of both Ras and Bitwoded of the Abyssinian Empire in 1790.

The family of Dejazmach Kefla Yessous and Wolde Selassie were of distinguished origin, and came from Antalo, in Enderta, of which place they were chiefs. Ras Wolde Selassie was known to be one of the bravest princes in the records of Abyssinia after engaging successfully in more than forty battles and rising to the level of Betwoded Enderase while a governor of all provinces as well as the major counties of Tigray, Gondar and Merebmilash (Eritrea) between 1790 and 1816. He was distinguished more for his intrepidity and firmness than by the politics and policy with which he had uniformly governed Abyssinia as Enderassie during the reign of Emperors Tekle Haymanot II, Tekle Giyorgis I and Egwale Seyon. His wives included Mentwab (died in 1812 from smallpox), the sister of Emperor Egwale Seyon; and Sahin, the daughter of Emperor Tekle Giyorgis.

Wolde Selassie made his seat of government in Chalacot, but maintained his capital at Hintalo in Enderta Province. He built four residential palaces at Chelekot, Hintalo, Mekelle and Felegdaro all within Enderta. He played a role in the politics of the Imperial Throne, in part by providing shelter to Emperor Tekle Giyorgis I in 1799 and 1800, and was visited by the former Emperor Baeda Maryam in 1813. Although at first he cooperated with Ras Aligaz, the Imperial Regent, after his power grew, Wolde Selassie came to challenge Aligaz for that office prior to Aligaz's death in 1803. The first years of the 19th century were disturbed by fierce campaigns between Ras Gugsa of Begemder, and Ras Wolde Selassie of Tigray, who fought over control of the figurehead Emperor Egwale Seyon. Wolde Selassie was eventually the victor, and practically ruled the whole country as Enderase until his death in 1816. Wolde Selassie, a conservative Christian who greatly valued Ethiopia's monarchical traditions, hated the Yeju parvenus. He hit out at them by effectively conquering the Azebo and Raya and by taking control over all the important passes in Lasta leading to Tigray. He then turned his attention to the coast, slowly but surely imposing his suzerainty over the Muslim authorities there until he finally could control and tax their trade inland; he used the revenues, to train, reform and re-equip his army and when the 19th century opened, Wolde Selassie was by far Abyssinia's leading figure and certainly the main champion of the Solomonic tradition. For 25 years, Ras Wolde Selassie was known to have had wielded the most power during his tenure as Ras exceeding formidable rases such as Ras Aligaz of Yejju, Ras Gugsa of Gojam and the Oromo chieftain Gojje; and throughout his vast districts, all kinds of crimes, grievances, rebellions, disputes and inheritances were directly referred to him and most wars were carried by himself in person.

According to Paul Henze, Ras Wolde Selassie was the first ruler of this period to have close contact with Europeans, hosting three British diplomats, George Annesley, Viscount Valentia, his secretary Henry Salt, and Pearce. Salt's arrival in Abyssinia culminated in the signing of a treaty of friendship with Wolde Selassie representing Abyssinia and the former representing Great Britain in 1805. Henry Salt also proposed inaugurating trade with Britain; Wolde Selassie was quick to see possible advantages in relations with Britain and promised to encourage such commerce with every means in his power. Revealing himself a realist, and speaking, Salt says, with 'great sincerity', he nevertheless expressed the fear that his country:

might not be able to supply any quantity of valuable commodities sufficient to recompense our merchants for engaging in so precarious a trade; more especially as the Abyssinians were not much acquainted with commercial transactions...Could any plan, however, be arranged for obviating these difficulties...he would most readily concur in carrying it into effect.

Wolde Selassie also touched on a major obstacle that the Abyssinians had faced, the Egyptians had control over the port of Massawa which they acquired from the Ottoman Empire and reminded King George that with their "naval superiority in the red sea" Abyssinia might find it difficult to gain access to the port. Wolde Selassie's effort, however, did bear fruit in the long term when his successors Dejazmatch Wube of Semien and Tigray and Emperor Yohanness of Ethiopia followed up on the treaty that was struck between him and the kingdom of Britain.

Nathaniel Pearce lived with Ras Wolde from about 1808 and the warlord's death. Pearce's diary of his stay is not only valuable for the history of this period, but also provides enormous detail about daily life in Ethiopia.

At the effort of Ras Wolde Selassie, Abyssinia received its bishop from Egypt at around 1816: Abuna Qerellos III (1816–1828) who made his residence in Antalo. Henry Salt who was one of the three British diplomats who visited Abyssinia both in 1805 and in 1810 was hosted by Ras Wolde Selassie at his residence in Antalo; he writes, "Ras Wolde Selassie ruled Abyssinia with firmness and a vigor of constitution that united the different ethnic groups of Abyssinia. When ever I have seen him in the exercise of his power, he has shown a vivacity of expression, a quickness comprehension, and a sort of commanding energy, that overawed all who approached him". Another British envoy, Mansfield Parkyns, adds, "Wolde Selassie reigned for twenty-five years, and during this long period obtained and maintained for himself the character of a good and wise prince". The Great Ras Wolde Selassie died at an advanced age in 1816 at his residence in Antalo, Enderta due to natural causes. His death was universally mourned.

=== The end of Zemene Mesafint ===
With the rise of Kassa Hailu of Quara known as Emperor Tewodros II of Ethiopia came the end of Zemene Mesafint. Originally little more than a bandit or an outlaw, surviving in the Ethiopian marches against the Sudan, Kassa won his way to control of first one province of Ethiopia, Dembiya, then following a series of battles beginning with Gur Amba (27 September 1852) and ending with Battle of Derasge (1855), came to control all of Ethiopia. With imperial power once again in the hand of a single man, Tewodros, the Zemene Mesafint had ceased to exist, and the beginning of a centralized authority had commenced.

==== The rise of Yohannes IV ====
Born into the family of the lords of Enderta and Tembien, Dejazmach Kassa Mercha, ascended the imperial throne in 1872 under the name Yohannes IV. He was born in 1831 to Mercha, Shum (or "governor") of Tembien, and his wife Woizero (or "Dame") Silass Dimtsu (Amata Selassie), who was the daughter of Dejazmach (roughly equivalent to "Duke") Dimtsu Debbab of Enderta the nephew of the powerful Ras Wolde Selassie of Enderta. With the death of Emperor Tewdros in 1868, Ethiopia was once again divided into three rival over lords: Wagshum Gobaze ruler of Amhara, Wag and Lasta, Dajazmtach Kasa Mercha of Tigray and Menilek, heir to the throne of Shawa. Wagshum Gobaze was immediately crowned Emperor Takla Giyorgis at Gondar. He was, however, soon effectively challenged by Dajazmach Kasa who was more powerful militarily, in part on account of the gift of arms he had received from the Napier expedition, and assistance given him by a former member of the British force, John Kirkham who had volunteered to train his army on European lines. Gobaze set out with 60,000 men to capture the city of Adwa, but Kassa, making good use of his British guns, defeated him at the battle of Assam, on 11 July 1871; He then proclaimed himself Emperor Yohannes IV, on 21 January of the following year. Yohannes was an uncompromising patriot, a staunch supporter of the church and a strong opponent of Christian missionaries. He accepted the existence of virtually independent rulers, provided that they recognized his overall suzerainty and paid him some occasional taxes. His reign coincided with the beginning of the age of Imperialism. Throughout his reign, Yohannes was embroiled in military struggles on his northern frontiers. First was from Khedive Isma'il Pasha of Egypt, who sought to bring the entire Nile River basin under his rule. The Egyptians marching from the port of Zeila occupied the city-state of Harar on 11 October 1875. The Egyptians then marched into northern Ethiopia from their coastal possessions around the port of Massawa. Yohannes pleaded with the British to stop their Egyptian allies, and even withdrew from his own territory in order to show the Europeans that he was the wronged party and that the Khedive was the aggressor. However, Yohannes soon realized that the Europeans would not stop the Khedive of Egypt. Yohannes responded by declaring war, and the Patriarch excommunicated in advance any soldiers who failed to respond to the call to arms. The powerful Egyptian army then crossed the Marab river into the heartland of Tegray, but were almost annihilated by the emperor's forces at the battle of Gundat (also called Guda-gude) on the morning of 16 November 1875; the Egyptians were tricked into marching into a narrow and steep valley and were wiped out by Ethiopian gunners surrounding the valley from the surrounding mountains. Virtually the entire Egyptian force, along with its many officers of European and North American background, were killed. News of this huge defeat was suppressed in Egypt for fear that it would undermine the government of the Khedive. The Khedive of Egypt Ismail, on learning of his unexpected reverse, assembled a much larger army of 15,000 to 20,000 men, armed with the most modern weapons. Yohannes mauled the invaders at the three-day battle of Gura, b/n 7 and 9 March 1876. His soldiers, who displayed great heroism, captured close on twenty cannon, as well as several thousand Remington rifles. His army as a result emerged as perhaps the first really well-equipped Ethiopian force in the country's history. The Egyptians aware of the extent of their defeats in 1875-6, as well as the apparent invincibility of the emperor's army, abandoned their expansionist ambitions in this part of Africa, as it turned out for ever. The Ethiopian victories of Gndat and Gura were important in that they helped to consolidate the internal political position of Yohannes, and assisted him forge a considerable measure of national unity. Yohannes went on to repel and quel on multiple occasions Italian and Sudan mahdist aggressions with his famed generals such as Ras Alula Aba Nega. In one of his last battles against the invading army of Mahdists who broke into the country, Yohannes hastened to Qallabat on the Sudan frontier to repel them, but, at the close of a victorious battle at Matamma on 9 March 1889, was mortally wounded by a sniper's bullet. He died on the following day, one of the last crowned heads in the world to die on the field of battle. According to Augustus B. Wylde who claimed to have heard the story from a priest who managed to escape the slaughter, wrote how Yohannes' uncle Ras Areya Dimtsu of Enderta stood beside the body of his dead master with "a few of his soldiers and the bravest of the king's servants, who had lost their all, and had no more prospects to live for". Ras Areya was last seen standing alongside the box containing the king's body, after having expended all his ammunition, with his shield and sword in his hands, defending himself, till at last he was speared by a Dervish from behind, and died fighting gamely like the fine old warrior that he was; according to Wylde, as he saw death come Ras Areya announced "that he was now old and done for, that his time had come, and it was useless at his age to serve another master that he knew little about, and it was better to die like a man fighting unbelievers, than like a mule in a stable."

Yohannes' successive struggles against foreign invaders, Egyptian, Dervis and Italian, left him moreover with little time for technological or other innovation. He nevertheless succeeded, in sending envoys on important diplomatic missions abroad. Yohannes was like wise the first Ethiopian ruler to appoint a foreign consul, a certain Samuel King, who served as his representative in London. Advancement in the medical field introduced mercury preparations for the treatment of syphilis came into extensive use at this time, at least in the principal Ethiopian towns. Yohannes also had in his court a Greek doctor, Nicholas Parisis. He was similarly the first Ethiopian monarch to be inoculated with modern-style smallpox vaccine, which was then beginning to replace the country's traditional inoculation.

=== Notable men of Enderta of the 18th-19th century AD ===
- Dejazmatch Weldo, hereditary chief of Enderta 1720–1747
- Dejazmatch Kefla Iyasus son of Amda Mikael, hereditary Chief of Enderta 1747–1773.
- Ras Wolde Selaassie Kefla Iyasus. Hereditary Chief of Enderta, b. Antalo (Hintalo), Enderta, 1736. The second son of Dejazmatch Kefla Iyasus, Governor of Endarta 1788–1790. Became ruler of Tigray, Gondar and most of the Mareb-Melash (Eritrea) from 1790 to 1816.
- Dejazmatch Debbab Kefla Iyasus, from Felegdaro-Enderta. Appointed as Kagnazmatch, 24 March 1799.
- Dejazmatch Blatengeta Mennasse Kifeleysous.
- Dejazmatch Gabre Mikael Sahlu, son of Shum sahlu (nephew of Ras Wolde Selassie Kefla Iyasus) Shum Temben 1814–1815, Governor of Semien 1815–1816, and Lieutenant-Governor of Tigray 1816–1822. Granted the title of Dejazmatch before 24 May 1815.
- Dejazmatch Wolde Rufael Debbab, second son of Dejazmatch Debbab Kefla Iyasus, Succeeded his paternal uncle (Ras Wolde Sellassie Kefla Iyasus) as ruler of Tigray, under the regency of Dejazmatch Gabre Mikael of Temben from 1816 to 1818.
- Dejazmatch Haile Mariam Gabre. son of Woizero Shlitu, daughter of Dejazmatch Kefla Iyasus of Enderta, Kagnazmatch 1811. Governor of Walqayt 1811–1812, and of Semien 1815–1826.
- Dejazmatch Dimtsu Debbab, grandfather of Emperor Yohaness IV and son of Dejazmatch Debbab Kifleyesous of Enderta. Hereditary Chief of Enderta, died in 1817.
- Ras Araya Dimtsu, b. Egrihariba, Enderta, in 1810. Son of Dejazmatch Dimtsu Debbab of Endarta and maternal unckle of Emperor Yohannes IV (through Ras Araya Dimtsu's sister Amate Sellassie Dimtsu). Succeeded his father, Dejazmach Dimtsu Debbaba as hereditary chief of Enderta. Governor of Tigray 1855–1863, imprisoned at Magdala 1863–1868, Chief crown Councillor to Emperor Yohaness 1868–1889 and a foremost and a distinguished statesman in Yohanese's government who was second to the Emperor only. An influential governor of Akale Guzay province of Mereb Milash (Eritrea) throughout the 1870s and 1880s. He was killed defending Emperor Yohannese's baggage train from the Mahdists, at Metemma, 11 March 1889.
- Emperor Yohannes IV, King of Seyon (Zion), King of Kings of Ethiopia. b. 11 July 1837, as Lij Kassa Mirtcha, Younger son of Dejazmatch Mirtcha Wolde Kidane, Shum Temben, by his wife, Woizero Amata Selassie of Chelekot-Enderta (daughter of Dejazmatch Dimtsu Debbab of Enderta the nephew of the powerful Ras Woldeselassie of Enderta). Fought and defeated Emperor Takla Giyorgis II at Assem (Adwa) and proclaimed as Emperor Yohannes IV, at Axum, 11 July 1871. Crowned at the Cathedral of St Mary of Zion, Axum, 21 January 1872 (the last Emperor to be crowned there), Emperor of Ethiopia, 1872–1889.
- Ras Bitwoded Gebremeskel Tsadik b. Qata, Enderta, A distinguished statesman, served as the right-hand man of Emperor Yohaness in government affairs, law, administration and diplomacy for the kingdom of Ethiopia as an Enderassie from 1872 to 1889. Ras Bitweded Gebremeskel died along with Ras Araya Dimtsu defending Emperor Yohannese's baggage train from the Mahdists, at Metemma, 11 March 1889.
- Ras Bitwoded Gabre Kidane Zammu, b. Hintalo, Enderta, son of Blattangeta Zammu of Hintalo Enderta. A distinughsed warrior, he commanded the Ethiopian army and defeated the Egyptians and Ottoman Turks at the battle of Quatit in 1884. A great politician, he was raised to the personal titles of Blattangata by Emperor Yohannes IV, and later promoted to Ras Bitwodad in 1872. Prime Minister of the Ethiopian empire 1872–1889. He is the husband of Empress Dinkinesh Mirtcha, the sister of Emperor Yohaness by whom he had three children including Dejazmach Seyoum Gebrekidan. He died in 1895 at Harar, Ethiopia.
- Negus Araya Selassie, born before September 1867. Son of Yohannes IV, King of Seyun, educ. privately. Raised to the title of Ras 1872. Granted the kingdom of Tigray with the title of Negus as his dowry, by his father in October 1882. Confirmed as Heir Apparent by his father, June 1884. Governor of Enderta 1872–1882, Governor-General of Wollo 1882–1886, and of Begamber and Dembiya 1886–1888.
- Le'ul Ras Seyum Mangasha, Prince of Tigray, b. 24 June 1897, only son of Ras Mangasha Yohannes, Prince of Tigray, educated privately. Field Marshal 1934, Governor-General of Tigray 1906–1921 and of Western Tigray 1921–1936.
- le'ul Ras Gugsa Araya Selassie. born in 1886. Son of Negus Araya Selassie, King of Tigray. Governor of Eastern Tigray (Mekelle) 1921–1933.

=== Woyane Rebellion ===
In an Imperial determination to weaken the power of the regional nobles and elites of Ethiopia, the Haile Selassie government in 1941 introduces a new regional administration. The law or edict provides for fourteen provinces (Teklay gizat), around 100 counties (Awrajas), and 600 districts (Woredas). Therefore, curbing the power of the hundreds of nobles and their provinces throughout the Empire. This then enabled Haile Selassie to centralize his authority and in effect rendered these nobles with their administrations dependent to the central government. Historians agree that "the basic policy of Haile Selassie was a centralizing one continuing the tradition of the great centralizing Emperors from 1855 onwards." The provision reduced the many provinces of Tigray into eight counties: Raya Azebo, Enderta, Tembien, Kilete Awla'lo, Agame, Adowa, Axum and Shire along with many districts under each of the counties' jurisdictions. After the liberation of Ethiopia from Italian occupation in 1941, Ethiopia saw many rebellions spread out in different parts of the empire. Among these rebellions however, the "Woyane Rebellion" in southern and eastern Tigray in 1943 had become a powerful and highly popular uprising that, within a few months it had shaken the government of Haile Selassie to its core and as a consequence, the Imperial government resorted in using aerial bombardment by collaborating with the British Royal Air Force so as to quell the rebellion. The woyane uprising in Tigray seems to have arisen when administrative corruption and greed ignited a situation of existing instability and insecurity, one awash with weaponry in the wake of the Italian defeat.

==== The rebellion ====
In 1943, open resistance broke out all over southern and eastern Tigray under the slogan, "there is no government; let's organize and govern ourselves." Throughout Enderta awraja including, Mekelle, Didibadergiajen, Hintalo, Saharti, Samre and Wajirat, Raya awraja, Kilete-Awlaelo awraja and Tembien awraja, local assemblies, called gerreb, were immediately formed. The gerreb sent representatives to a central congress, called the shengo, which elected leadership and established military command system.

The rebels established their headquarters at Wokro. During the rainy season of 1943 the rebels under the leadership of Fitawrari Yeebio Woldai and Dejazmach Neguise Bezabih, hailing from Enderta, which was the heart of the woyane rebellion, were busy organizing their forces; and after celebrating the Ethiopian New Year on 12 September, they went on the besieged government garrison at Quiha. The highly equipped government forces were to meet with the poorly equipped but determined rebels for the first time in the rebels' stronghold district of Didiba Dergiajen, Enderta in the village of Sergien; the rebels under the leadership of Fitawrari Yeebio Woldai (Wedi Weldai) and Dej. Neguisie Bezabih defeated the government forces decisively; they captured countless modern weapons that helped them attract many peasants to join the rebellion; and many government soldiers deserted and joined the rebellion. In the month of September 1943, on the government's second offensive in the village of Ara, also in Enderta, the woyane rebels under Wedi Weldai scored yet a second victory over the heavily armed government forces; this time, the rebels captured high level feudal chiefs including and killed many prominent Tigray and Amhara war lords that sided with the Emperor Haile Selassie's government. The rebels under Bashay Gugsa Mengesha also captured General Essyas and many of his commanders and imperial soldiers at Quiha. The rebel forces estimated at 20,000, moved eastward from Quiha to Enda Yesus, a fort overlooking the provincial capital, Mekelle. They captured the fort and then took Mekelle. The representatives of Haile Selassie's government fled. The woyanti issued a proclamation to the inhabitants of Mekelle which stated, inter alia:

"Our governor is Jesus Christ...
And our flag that of Ethiopia.
Our religion is that of Yohannes IV.
People of Tigray, follow the motto of Weyane."

==== The Pan Ethiopian nature of Woyanne ====
The slogans of the first Woyanne were clearly Pan Ethiopian and for equality and autonomy. Their proclamation after liberating Mekelle had five main points.

- Reduced tax
- Local leadership to collect tax
- Appointment of one's own leaders free of domination.
- Eradication of thieves and bandits (shiftas)
- Objection to payment of excessive taxation and payment to appointee of the Emperor

A similar victory was achieved by the rebels under the leadership of one of the top leaders of the woyane movement namely Dejazmach Negussie Bezabih and Bashay Gugsa Mengesha again in the district of Hintalo and Wajerat in Enderta; the rebels defeated the heavily armed government forces numbering in thousands and aided by British air power, the rebels were able to capture and acquire yet again heavy modern armaments. By 20 September the successful Weyane rebel army was ready to turn south to face an Ethiopian force attempting to advance to Tigray. Haile Selassie had ordered his minister of war Ras Abebe Aregai, to take charge of the campaign against the rebels. The Ras rushed northward and arrived at Korem, south of Maichew, on 17 September but his way was blocked by rebels. During the next three weeks, the Weyane forces fought hard against Ras Abebe's Ethiopian troops, who were bolstered by a small contingent of British officers and specialists. The fighting centered on the great natural fortress of Amba Alaji. Basha Gugusa, one of the first Woyanne leaders, led the battle of Ambalage in the month of September 1943 to victory over Imperial army which was well equipped and supported by British airpower. The Weyane forces outnumbered those of the government, but their advantage in numbers was offset by artillery and British air power. The woyane leaders precipitated the final decisive battle by launching a three-pronged attack on government positions with perhaps 10,000 men. The war is spread to Alaje in Raya, Wukro in Agame and Tembien whereby the rebels mostly peasants beat the huge government forces equipped with tanks and modern weapons led by Ras Abebe Aregai, General Abebe Damtew and aided by British Col. Pluck. The total annihilation of government forces heavily supported by the British army sent a signal to the Emperor, that "the Tigrians weren't only brave fighters but also astute strategist" said Hailemariam when he gave an interview to Wegahta magazine. Countless British officers were killed including Col. Pluck who was killed by a Woyane rebel. The inability to subdue the rebellion prompted the Emperor to authorize an aerial bombardment by collaborating with the British royal air force. On 6 14 October bombs and on the 14th 54 bombs were dropped in the provincial capital Mekelle respectively; on 7, 16 October bombs and on the 9th 32 bombs were dropped in Corbetta Raya and Hintalo Enderta respectively as well, though they were devastating mainly to civilians with thousands of people killed, they did not however, crush the rebellion. Although the rebels scattered and battle formations began to disintegrate on 7 October, uncertainty still affected the Ethiopian government forces and Ras Abebe did not personally move out of Korem until 9 October. He then moved systematically northward and entered Quiha and Mekelle on 14 October, capturing the erstwhile rebel headquarters at Wokro on 17 October. Ras Abebe Aregai was appointed as governor of Tigray and was given authority with the pacification of that province. His pacification was brutal. The punishment for the uprising severe as it may be with the aerial bombardment, the people were obliged to pay large sums of money and their land was confiscated and distributed to loyal gentry as a punishment and deterrent to future revolt. A new taxation was imposed that 'cost the peasants five times more than they had under the Italians during the occupation. Ten woyane rebel leaders were captured and sent to prison in Debrebirhan. Including the top leaders, Basha Gugsa Mengesha, Dej. Bezabih Negussie, and Hailemariam Reda. Bashay Gugsa was also not allowed to return to Tigray, because the central government feared his influence. However, the central government tried to make use of his military skills and sent him with a group of soldiers to suppress other rebellions in the southern Ethiopia. Although the Woyane rebellion of 1943 had shortcomings as a prototype revolution, historians however agree that, the Woyane rebellion had involved a fairly high level of spontaneity and peasant initiative. It demonstrated considerable popular participation, and reflected widely shared grievances. The uprising was unequivocally and specifically directed against the central amhara regime of Haile Selassie I, rather than the Tigrian imperial elite.

=== Notable men of Enderta of the 20th century AD ===
- Dejazmatch Hailu Araya (Son of Ras Araya dimtsu of Enderta). Governor of Enderta and Denkel-Afar and a longtime Bea'al Gada (title assumed by Enderta governors who administered the salt making districts of Denkel)
- Dejazmatch Tadla Araya [Abba Guben] (son of Ras Araya dimtsu of Enderta). A distinguished warrior and a Hero of the battle of Adwa who commanded the Endertan army at Mariam Shewito in Adwa against the Italians in 1896 and led his Endertan army to victory.
- Dejazmach Abraha Araya, 1872–1917, (Son of Ras Araya dimtsu of Enderta) a distinguished warrior and a notable contender to the overlordship of Tigray, governor of Raya Azebo, Enderta, Tembien and Kilete-awlalo, 1902–1909. Minister of the interior, 1911–1917. He built a magnificent palace at Mekelle "Abraha Castle"
- Le'ul Ras Mangasha Seyum. b. Dengolat, Enderta 7 December 1927. Son of Le'ul Ras Seyum Mengesha. Governor of Arussi 1952–1955, and Sidamo 1955–1958, Minister for Public Works 1958–1961. Recognised as hereditary Prince of Tigray after the death of his father, January 1961. Went into exile 1974. Founder and President Ethiopian Democratic Union (EDU).
- Dejazmach Maru Aram, from Enderta, Tigary. Governor of Enderta and Tembien in the 1940s. An Ethiopian patriot who fought against colonial fascist Italy from 1935 to 1941 for independence and freedom.
- Dejazmatch Atsebeha Tessema, from Saharti/Samre-Enderta. Governor of Selawa and Saharti. An Ethiopian patriot who fought against colonial fascist Italy from 1935 to 1941 for independence and freedom.
- Dejazmatch Alemayohu Habtu, from Enderta, Tigray. An Ethiopian patriot who fought against colonial fascist Italy from 1935 to 1941 for independence and freedom.
- Dejazmatch Teferi Aba Bula, from Enderta, Tigray. An Ethiopian patriot who fought against colonial fascist Italy from 1935 to 1941 for independence and freedom.
- Dejazmatch Beyene Woreta, from Enderta, Tigray. An Ethiopian patriot who fought against colonial fascist Italy from 1935 to 1941 for independence and freedom.
- Fitawrari Bisue Weldejiworgis, from Saharti-Enderta, Tigary. Governor of Saharti, an Ethiopian patriot who fought against colonial fascist Italy from 1935 to 1941 for independence and freedom.
- Fitawrari Hadgu Bogale, from Enderta, Tigray. An Ethiopian patriot who fought against colonial fascist Italy from 1935 to 1941 for independence and freedom.
- Fitawrari Alemayouh, from Enderta, Tigray. An Ethiopian patriot who fought against colonial fascist Italy from 1935 to 1941 for independence and freedom.
- Dejazmatch Liben, from Enderta, Tigray. An Ethiopian patriot who fought against colonial fascist Italy from 1935 to 1941 for independence and freedom.
- Fitawrari Eyasu Atsebaha, from Mekelle-Enderta, Tigray. An Ethiopian patriot who fought against colonial fascist Italy from 1935 to 1941 for independence and freedom.
- Gerazmach Abera Kebede Deress, from Mekelle-Enderta, Tigray. An Ethiopian patriot who fought against colonial fascist Italy from 1935 to 1941 for independence and freedom.
- Gerazmach Abebe Woldegiorgis, from Enderta, Tigray. An Ethiopian patriot who fought against colonial fascist Italy from 1935 to 1941 for independence and freedom.
- Fitawrari Assegu Seyufu, from Enderta, Tigary. An Ethiopian patriot who fought against colonial fascist Italy from 1935 to 1941 for independence and freedom.
- Kegnazmach Ambaye Fiseha, from Enderta, Tigary. An Ethiopian patriot who fought against colonial fascist Italy from 1935 to 1941 for independence and freedom.
- Fitwarari Berhe Engeda, from Enderta, Tigary. An Ethiopian patriot who fought against colonial fascist Italy from 1935 to 1941 for independence and freedom.
- Girazmatch Gebru Gebremesqel from Gembela/Gerealta-Enderta. A long time Negedras of Tigray throughout the 1920s, '30s and '40s.
- Girazmatch Berhe Kassa, from Da'mesqel/Mekelle-Enderta. A long time governor of Berahley, Reged, Arho and dallul in Denkel and Parliamentarian of Enderta awraja in the 1960s.
- Fitawrari Yeebio Woldai (Wedi Weldai), b. Samre-Enderta, Tigray. Chief leader and commander of the 1943 woyane rebellion in Tigray. He is also an Ethiopian patriot who fought against colonial fascist Italy from 1935 to 1941 for independence and freedom.
- Dejazamtch Bezabih Negusse (Wedi Mebrek), b. Da' Meskel-Mekelle, Enderta, Tigray. Top leader and commander of the 1943 woyane rebellion in Tigray. He is also an Ethiopian patriot who fought against colonial fascist Italy from 1935 to 1941 for independence and freedom. He was imprisoned by Italian occupying forces and was later freed by Ethiopian patriots in 1941.
- Bashay Gugsa Mengesha, b. Adi-seleste, Hintalo-Enderta, Tigray. Top leader and commander of the 1943 woyane rebellion in Tigray.
- Blata Hailemariam Reda, b. Dandera-Enderta, Tigray. Commander of the 1943 woyane rebellion in Tigray.
- Lieutenant General Tadesse Werede Tesfay. from Enderta, born in 1958 in Mekelle-Enderta, Tigray, Head of the Joint Training Department and Army Corps Commander, Ethiopian National Defense Force, Commander, United Nations Interim Security Force for Abyei, from 2011 to 2013. A veteran in the Ethiopian National Defense Force, holding various high-ranking positions from 1991 to 2014.
- Ato Gebru Asrat. b. Mekelle-Enderta, Tigray. Governor of Tigray region, 1991–2001.

Kagnazmatch Hadgu Tedela An Ethiopian patriot who fought against colonial fascist Italy from 1935 to 1941 for independence and freedom see Feodor Kon0valo "The battle of Tembien"

- Aselaf Desta who fought Italian invasion in the Tembien battles and was later killed by the Italians in Mekelle.

== Democratic tradition in Enderta ==
Tradition holds that seventy elders are elected from each local administration (ገረብ) of Enderta to serve as mediators and peace-makers among the inhabitants of the many districts (woredas) of Enderta in case of rivalries, uprising and disputes that might arise within Enderta (Erqi Enderta, as it is still called in Tigray). These seventy elders were also bestowed provincial authority by the governor of the province to legally represent Enderta and its people in a provincial level with neighboring districts, counties and provinces. This is a form of old age democratic process through which elected and assigned elders are representing their constituency in social, political, and governmental affairs within the empire of Ethiopia. In a communal or individual level, individual Endertans enjoyed self representation within the district, county and even the provincial level; in Enderta, jural independence included the right to claim farmland and to represent oneself in community councils and in court. In a household level, Endertans had a strong ethos of individualism and that households were more political than kin units, with non-kin recruited on a contractual basis for their labor. Important to this ethos of individualism was a man's construction of a Hidmo as a material statement of his ambition to be someone of consequence in his community, an ambition that could not be expressed through an inherited house which was (and often still is) destroyed. Within villages and major towns throughout Enderta during the monarchy time, many individuals became 'big men' by accumulating great wealth and acquiring a following of poorer households that were dependent for food and oxen, a debt repaid with labor and loyalty.

== Woredas ==
Enderta's historical woredas/districts and zone (Denkel) with their respective administrative centers include the following:

- Enderta – Meqele
- Dedeba Dergajen - Kwiha
- Gabat Melash – Hentalo
- Wenberta – Maimekden
- Bora-Selewa – Dala
- Saharti – Gijet
- Gere-alta – TsigeReda
- Waereb – Samre
- Wajerat – Debub
- Denkel, Zone two of Afar – Shekhet
