= Tekle Haymanot of Gondar =

Proclaimed Emperor of Ethiopia from 1786 to 1789

Tekle Haymanot
- nəgusä nägäst

Emperor of Ethiopia (proclaimed)
- Reign: 1787–1789
- Predecessor: Baeda Maryam
- Successor: Tekle Giyorgis I
- Dynasty: House of Solomon

Tekle Haymanot was proclaimed Emperor from February 1788 to 1789 by the Emperor Baede Maryam's courtiers. He established his palace in Gondar, and ruled there for around a year. He may be identical with the Emperor "Haimanot" mentioned by Henry Salt, who ruled for a year between Iyasu III and Hezqeyas and had died before 1810.

Tekle Haymanot of Gondar is sometimes given the title Atse, a less familiar Amharic word for "Emperor", to distinguish him from the other Emperors of Ethiopia with the same name. Since he was not recognized as a legitimate ruler, he is not assigned a number.
