= Atse Iyasu =

Emperor of Ethiopia from 1787 to 1788

Emperor of Ethiopia
- Reign: 1787 – 1788
- Predecessor: Iyasu III
- Successor: Baeda Maryam
- Dynasty: Ethiopian Empire

Iyasu or Joshua was a proclaimed emperor of Ethiopia from 1787 to 1788 in Tigray and Gojjam by enemies of Ras Ali I of Yejju. He was defeated in battle against Ras Ali.

== Reign ==
He is sometimes given the title Atse, a less familiar Amharic word for "Emperor", to distinguish him from the other emperors of Ethiopia with the same name.

He may be identical with the emperor "Yoas" mentioned by Nathaniel Pearce. Pearce reports that "Yoas" was living in Gondar at the time of his death (May, 1813), and died penniless "without leaving sufficient even to purchase a coffin to receive ... [his] remains, or money enough for fettart or toscar."

== Notes ==
Regnal titles
Preceded by Tekle Giyorgis	Emperor of Ethiopia; 1787–1788	Succeeded by Tekle Giyorgis
