= List of state leaders in 1800 =

This is a list of heads of state, heads of governments, and other rulers in the year 1800.

== Africa ==
- Akwa Akpa (Old Calabar) –
  - Ekpenyong Offiong Okoho, King of Akwa Akpa (1786–1805)
- Ashanti Empire –
  - Osei Kwame Panyin, Asantehene (1777–1803)
- Bunyoro –
  - Nyamutukura Kyebambe III, Omukama of Bunyoro (1786–1835)
- Kingdom of Burundi –
  - Ntare IV Rutaganzwa Rugamba (1796–1852)
- Kingdom of Dahomey –
  - Adandozan (1797–1818)
- Ethiopian Empire –
  - Demetros (1799–1800)
  - Tekle Giyorgis I (fifth reign, 1800)
  - Demetros (restored, 1800–1801)
- Gciriku –
  - Shimwemwe (1785-1805)
- Funj Sultanate - Ranfi (1798-1804)
- Kingdom of Kaffa -
  - Hoti Gaocho (1798-1821)
- Ketu –
  - Ajibolu, Oba of Ketu (1795–1816)
- Kingdom of Loango -
  - Tati, the Nganga Mvumbi (c. 1787 - c. 1801)
- Sultanate of Morocco –
  - Slimane (1792–1822)
- Sultanate of Ndzuwani –
  - Alawi bin Husain (1796–1816)
- Kingdom of Rwanda –
  - Yuhi III, Mwami (1797–1830)
- Beylik of Tunis –
  - Bey - Hammuda ibn Ali (1782–1814)
  - Grand Vizier – Yusuf Sahib al-Tabi (1800–1815)
- Wadai Empire –
  - Muhammad Salih Derret ibn Jawda (1795–1803)
- Wolof Empire –
  1. Mba Kompass (1763–1800)
  2. Mba Buri-Nyabu (1800–1818)
- Yauri Emirate –
  - Muhammadu Dan Ayi dan Ahmadu Jerabana Albishir, Emir of Yauri (1799–1829)
- Zulu –
  - Senzangakhona kaJama, King of the Zulu (1781–1816)

== Americas ==
- State of Muskogee –
  - William Augustus Bowles, Director General of Muskogee (1799–1803)
- United States
  - Head of State/Government -
    - John Adams, President of the United States (1797–1801)

== Asia ==
  - Afghanistan -
    - Zaman Shah, King of Afghanistan (1793–1801)
- Durrani Empire –
  - Zaman Shah (1793–1801)
- Alirajpur State - Pratap Singh I (1765-1818)
- China (Qing dynasty) –
  - Jiaqing Emperor (1796–1820)
- Jaipur - Pratap Singh (1778-1803)
- Empire of Japan
  - Monarch – Kōkaku (1780–1817)
  - Tokugawa
  - Shōgun Tokugawa Ienari (1786–1837)
  - Ryukyu Kingdom –
  - Shō On (1796–1802)
- Jodhpur State - Bhim Singh of Marwar (1793-1803)
- Khanate of Kokand –
  - 'Alim Khan (1800–1809)
- Korea (Joseon) –
  1. Jeongjo (1776–1800)
  2. Sunjo (1800–1834)
- Kingdom of Luang Phrabang - Anurutha (1794-1819)
- Sultanate of the Maldives – Mu'in ad-Din I Muhammad (1799–1835)
- Nepal – Girvan Yuddha Bikram Shah (1799–1816), Maharajadhiraja of Nepal
- Rajpipla State - Naharsinhji (1793-1803)
- Siam – Rama I (1782–1809)
- Đại Việt (Tây Sơn dynasty) –
  - Nguyễn Quang Toản (1792–1802)
- Tonk –
  - Amir Khan, Nawab of Tonk (1798–1834)

== Europe ==
- Principality of Abkhazia –
  - Kelesh Ahmed-Bey Shervashidze (1747–1806)
- Andorra –
  - Francesc Antoni de la Dueña y Cisneros, Bishop of Urgell (1797–1816)
- Batavian Republic –
  - Uitvoerend Bewind (1798–1801)
- Kingdom of Denmark–Norway
  - Monarch – Christian VII (1766–1808)
  - Minister of State - Christian Günther von Bernstorff (1797–1810)
- Kingdom of Etruria –
- French First Republic –
  - Napoleon Bonaparte, First Consul (1799–1804)
- Kingdom of Great Britain –
  - Monarch – George III (1760–1820)
  - Prime Minister – William Pitt the Younger (1783–1801)
- Helvetic Republic –
  1. Executive Directory (1798–January 1800)
  2. Provisional Executive Power (January 1800)
  3. Provisional Executive Commission (January–August 1800)
  4. Provisional Executive Commission (August 1800 – 1801)
- Holy Roman Empire –
  - Francis II (1792–1806)
  - Principality of Anhalt-Bernburg –
  - Alexius (1796–1834)
  - Principality of Anhalt-Dessau –
  - Leopold III (1751–1817)
  - Principality of Anhalt-Köthen –
  - Augustus Christian Frederick (1789–1812)
  - Margraviate of Baden –
  - Charles Frederick (1738–1811)
  - Electorate of Bavaria –
  - Maximilian IV Joseph (1799–1825)
  - Kingdom of Bohemia –
  - Francis I (1792–1835)
  - Electorate of Brandenburg –
  - Frederick William III (1797–1840)
  - Duchy of Brunswick-Wolfenbüttel –
  - Charles II (1780–1806)
  - Electorate of Cologne –
  - Maximilian Franz of Austria, Archbishop-Elector (1784–1801)
  - Electorate of Hanover –
  - George III (1760–1820)
  - Landgraviate of Hesse-Darmstadt –
  - Louis X (1790–1830)
  - Landgraviate of Hesse-Kassel –
  - William IX (1785–1821)
  - Duchy of Holstein-Oldenburg –
  - * Duke - Wilhelm (1785–1823)
  - * Prince-Regent – Peter of Holstein-Gottorp (1785–1823)
  - Electorate of Mainz –
  - Friedrich Karl Joseph von Erthal, Archbishop-Elector (1774–1802)
  - Duchy of Mecklenburg-Schwerin –
  - Frederick Francis I (1785–1837)
  - Duchy of Mecklenburg-Strelitz –
  - Charles II (1794–1816)
  - Duchy of Saxe-Coburg-Saalfeld –
    1. Ernest Frederick (1764–1800)
    2. Francis (1800–1806)
  - Duchy of Saxe-Gotha-Altenburg –
  - Ernest II (1772–1804)
  - Duchy of Saxe-Hildburghausen –
  - Frederick (1780–1826)
  - Duchy of Saxe-Meiningen –
  - George I (1763–1803)
  - Duchy of Saxe-Weimar –
  - Karl August (1758–1828)
  - Duchy of Saxe-Eisenach –
  - Karl August (1758–1828)
  - Electorate of Saxony –
  - Frederick Augustus III (1763–1827)
  - Electorate of Trier –
  - Clemens Wenzel of Saxony, Archbishop-Elector (1768–1802)
  - Duchy of Württemberg –
  - Frederick II (1797–1816)

- Kingdom of Hungary –
  - Francis I (1792–1835)
- Kingdom of Ireland –
  - George III (1760–1820)
- Kingdom of Naples –
  - Ferdinand IV (1759–1806)
- Ottoman (Turkish) Empire
  - Sultan - Selim III (1789–1807)
  - Grand Vizier – Yusuf Ziyaüddin Pasha (1798–1805)
- Papal States –
  - Pope Pius VII (1800–1823)
- Duchy of Parma –
  - Ferdinand (1765–1802)
- Kingdom of Portugal and the Algarves –
  - Monarch – Maria I (1777–1816)
  - Prince-Regent – Prince John (1792–1816)
- Kingdom of Prussia –
  - Frederick William III (1797–1840)
- Russian Empire –
  - Paul I, Tsar of Russia (1796–1801)
- Kingdom of Sardinia –
  - Charles Emmanuel IV (1796–1802)
- Kingdom of Sicily –
  - Ferdinand III (1759–1825)
- Kingdom of Spain –
  - Charles IV (1788–1808)
- Kingdom of Sweden –
  - Gustav IV Adolf (1792–1809)
- Grand Duchy of Tuscany –
  - Ferdinand III (1790–1801)
- United Kingdom of Great Britain and Ireland
  - Monarch – George III (1760–1820)
  - Prime Minister -
    - William Pitt (1783–1801)

== Middle East ==
- Abu Dhabi –
  - Shakhbut bin Dhiyab Al Nahyan, Shaikh of Abu Dhabi (1793–1816)
- Nakhichevan Khanate –
  - Kalbali Khan (1787-1823)
- Persia (Qajar dynasty) –
  - Fath-Ali Shah Qajar (1797–1834)

== Oceania ==
- Kingdom of Tahiti –
  - Pōmare I (1791–1803)
