= Egwale Seyon =

Emperor of Ethiopia from 1801 to 1818

Emperor of Ethiopia
- Reign: June 1801 – 12 June 1818
- Predecessor: Demetros
- Successor: Iyoas II
- Died: 12 June 1818
- Spouse: Walatta Iyasus
- Issue: 5 children
Names
- Gwalu
Regnal name
- Newaya Sagad
- Dynasty: House of Solomon
- Father: Hezqeyas
- Religion: Ethiopian Orthodox Tewahedo

Egwale Seyon (Ge'ez: እጓለ ጽዮን; died 12 June 1818), throne name Newaya Sagad (Ge'ez: ንዋየ ሰገድ), was Emperor of Ethiopia from June 1801 to 12 June 1818, and a member of the Solomonic dynasty. He was the son of Hezqeyas.

== Assumption of power and family ==
According to Henry Salt, after a period when the Imperial throne was held by a number of different appointees due to "the preponderance of the different provinces", Rasses Wolde Selassie of Tigray and Gugsa of Yejju, and chief of the Oromo, brought this rapid succession to an end by making Egwale Seyon Emperor. He then married Walatta Iyasus, the sister of Ras Gugsa, and they had five children. When Salt visited Ras Wolde Selassie at his palace in Chalacot in 1809/1810, the Emperor's brother, Kenyazmach Iyasu, was also a guest of the Ras.

== Reign ==
The writer of The Royal chronicle of Abyssinia notes that, after one brief campaign into Wegera with Ras Gugsa at the beginning of his reign, which was notable for Ewale Seyon's meeting with his father Hezqeyas, he never left Gondar. The chronicler later laments:

Nothing took place in the habitations, since nothing was done good or bad, no appointments and no dismissals; for there was an authority over the Negus in the hands of a Galla, who was called Dajazmach Gugsa.

From 1803 on, his reign was marked by constant civil war. Most of the battles were part of a three-sided struggle between Ras Gugsa, Ras Zewde of Gojjam, and Wolde Selassie. Egwale Seyon was also twice attacked at Gondar (1804 and 1808) by the disgraced Balambaras Asserat, who was supported by armies of the Oromo who lived south of the Abay River. Following the death of Abuna Yosab III in 1803, Ras Gugsa plundered the episcopal properties, but Ras Zewde forced him to return a part of what his men had stolen. A little more than five years later, Ras Zewde attempted to depose Egwale Seyon and replace him with the former Emperor Tekle Giyorgis, but on 24 February 1809 Ras Gugsa arrived and Ras Zewde's army refused to fight; Ras Zewde escaped on foot, and returned to his village.

Salt notes that throughout the turmoil of his reign, Egwale Seyon lived "neglected at Gondar, with a very small retinue of servants, and an income by no means adequate to the support of his dignity; so that, as he possesses neither wealth, power, nor influence in the state; royalty may be considered, for a time, almost eclipsed in the country." Nathaniel Pearce commented, following the Emperor's death, that Egwale Seyon "was always very sickly and of a weak constitution".

== Philanthropy ==
Despite his political impotence, one tangible accomplishment of Egwale Seyon's reign was his benefaction of Debre Berhan Selassie Church, known for its impressive collection of paintings; his patronage is proved by his numerous portraits in that church.

Regnal titles
Preceded by Demetros	Emperor of Ethiopia; 1801–1818	Succeeded by Iyoas II
