= Yonas =

Emperor of Ethiopia from 1797 to 1798

Emperor of Ethiopia
- Reign: 18 August 1797 – 4 January 1798
- Predecessor: Salomon III
- Successor: Tekle Giyorgis I
- Died: May 1813; Gojjam, Ethiopian Empire
- Dynasty: House of Solomon
- Father: Letezum
- Religion: Ethiopian Orthodox Tewahedo

Yonas (Ge'ez: ዮናስ; died May 1813) was Emperor of Ethiopia from 18 August 1797 to 4 January 1798, and a member of Solomonic dynasty. He was the son of Letezum, and the grandson of the Emperor Fasilides.

== Reign ==
According to E. A. Wallis Budge, Yonas was a figurehead, proclaimed Emperor by Ras Isra'el of Begemder, and deposed by Gugsa, a chieftain of the Yejju Oromo people. However, the Royal Chronicle records that he was proclaimed Emperor after the Emperor who controlled Gondar, Salomon III, had been defeated by the rebel Balambaras Asserat, who forced him to flee Gondar. However, during Yonas' reign the realm was afflicted by a famine in which "more men died than could be numbered." Yonas' son Mafu died 7 November, then his wife Esther, both apparently from this famine. Lacking any support or rationale for his rule, the major warlords of the time -- Ras Mare'ed, Dejazmach Hailu Eshte, Dejazmach Wolde Selassie, and Ras Guebra -- all successfully petitioned to Emperor Tekle Giyorgis to return from exile in Waldebba and become ruler once again. Upon learning of Tekle Giyorgis' approach when he was still one day's march away, Yonas fled to sanctuary in the Abuna's palace.

After months of hiding in the Abuna's palace, Yonas became a potential pawn when Waheldu, the brother of Asserat and also in conflict with the major warlords, attempted to have Yonas brought to him and used as his own candidate for Emperor. Tekle Giyorgis managed to foil this plot by giving amnesty to Yonas, and had him and Yonas' brother Goshu, "Dwell with him in friendship" in the Royal Enclosure.

By 1802, he was a prisoner in Lasta. Henry Salt is reported to have met with his son Fasilidas in Adowa 16 September 1805, and who "seemed anxious to have a private conversation [with Salt], but was prevented." Nathaniel Pearce reports that Yonas was living in exile in Gojjam at the time of his death, and died penniless "without leaving sufficient even to purchase a coffin to receive ... [his] remains, or money enough for fettart or toscar."

Regnal titles
Preceded by Salomon III	Emperor of Ethiopia; 1797–1798	Succeeded by Tekle Giyorgis I
