= Iyoas II =

Emperor of Ethiopia from 1818 to 1821

Emperor of Ethiopia
- Reign: 14 June 1818 – 3 June 1821
- Predecessor: Egwale Seyon
- Successor: Gigar
- Died: 3 June 1821
- House: House of Solomon
- Father: Hezqeyas
- Religion: Ethiopian Orthodox Tewahedo

Iyoas II (Ge'ez: ኢዮአስ, died 3 June 1821) was Emperor of Ethiopia from 14 June 1818 to 3 June 1821, and a member of the Solomonic dynasty. He was the son of Hezqeyas.

== Reign ==
The Royal chronicle provides very little information about his reign: only the date of his elevation and the year of his death. According to Nathaniel Pearce, Iyoas was selected Emperor over his nephews Zerobabel and Merrit by Ras Gugsa and Kenyazmach Akli Meru due to the nephews' bad characters. Prior to his elevation, he had been living as a monk in Waldebba.

Samuel Gobat, a near-contemporary of Iyoas, states he was "efficiently sustained by Ras Gugsa, who was his firm support, or rather his superior." With Iyoas' death an interregnum of several months followed.

== Notes ==
Regnal titles
Preceded by Egwale Seyon	Emperor of Ethiopia; 1818–1821	Succeeded by Gigar
