= Demetros =

Emperor of Ethiopia intermittently between 1799 and 1801

Emperor of Ethiopia
- Reign: 25 July 1799 – 24 March 1800
- Predecessor: Salomon III
- Successor: Tekle Giyorgis I
- Reign: June 1800 – June 1801
- Predecessor: Tekle Giyorgis I
- Successor: Egwale Seyon
- Died: 1802
- Burial: Ba'ata, Ethiopia
- Dynasty: House of Solomon
- Father: Arqedewos
- Religion: Ethiopian Orthodox Tewahedo

Demetros (died 1802) was Emperor of Ethiopia intermittently between 1799 and 1801, and a member of the Solomonic dynasty. He was the son of Arqedewos. He may be the same person as the "Adimo" mentioned in the account of the traveler Henry Salt who was dead by the time of Salt's visit to northern Ethiopia in 1809/1810.

== Reign ==
Demetros was elevated as Emperor by Dejazmach Gugsa and his brother Alula, who put his predecessor Emperor Salomon III in chains. Four days later he made Gugsa Dejazmach over Begemder, and five days after that Demetros appointed Alula Kenyazmach. However, in March of the next year, Tekle Giyorgis returned to Gondar, supported by Ras Wolde Selassie, and while Tekle Giyorgis made a point of not entering the palace, Demetros is commonly considered to have been deposed at that point.

The re-establishment of Demetros was not a somber event. According to the Royal Chronicle of Abyssinia, Demetros was taken against his will to the Royal Palace where he was crowned king when Tekle Giyorgis was away from Gondar warring in the provinces. "After that they turned him out and bringing in Takla Giyorgis King of Kings made him King over the other and even yet a third time drove him out of the Royal Palace when he had done nothing."

On this rapid succession of emperors at the will of the powerful warlords, the writer of The Royal Chronicle lamented,

I indeed am sad and stricken on account of this persecution of those revered kings. Who shall restore the dominion of the kingdom to you as of old he restored the kingdom from the Zagwe to the house of David, through the prayer of Iyasus Mo'a, and the covenant of Abuna Takla Haymanot, may he grant us this day that he restore the Kingdom. Amen.

The Royal Chronicle records his death late in 1802. He was buried at Ba'ata.

== Notes ==
Regnal titles
Preceded by Salomon III	Emperor of Ethiopia; 1799–1800	Succeeded by Tekle Giyorgis I
Preceded by Tekle Giyorgis I	Emperor of Ethiopia; 1800–1801	Succeeded by Egwale Seyon
