= Tekle Giyorgis I =

Emperor of Ethiopia intermittently between 1779 and 1800

Tekle Giyorgis I ተክለ ጊዮርጊስ
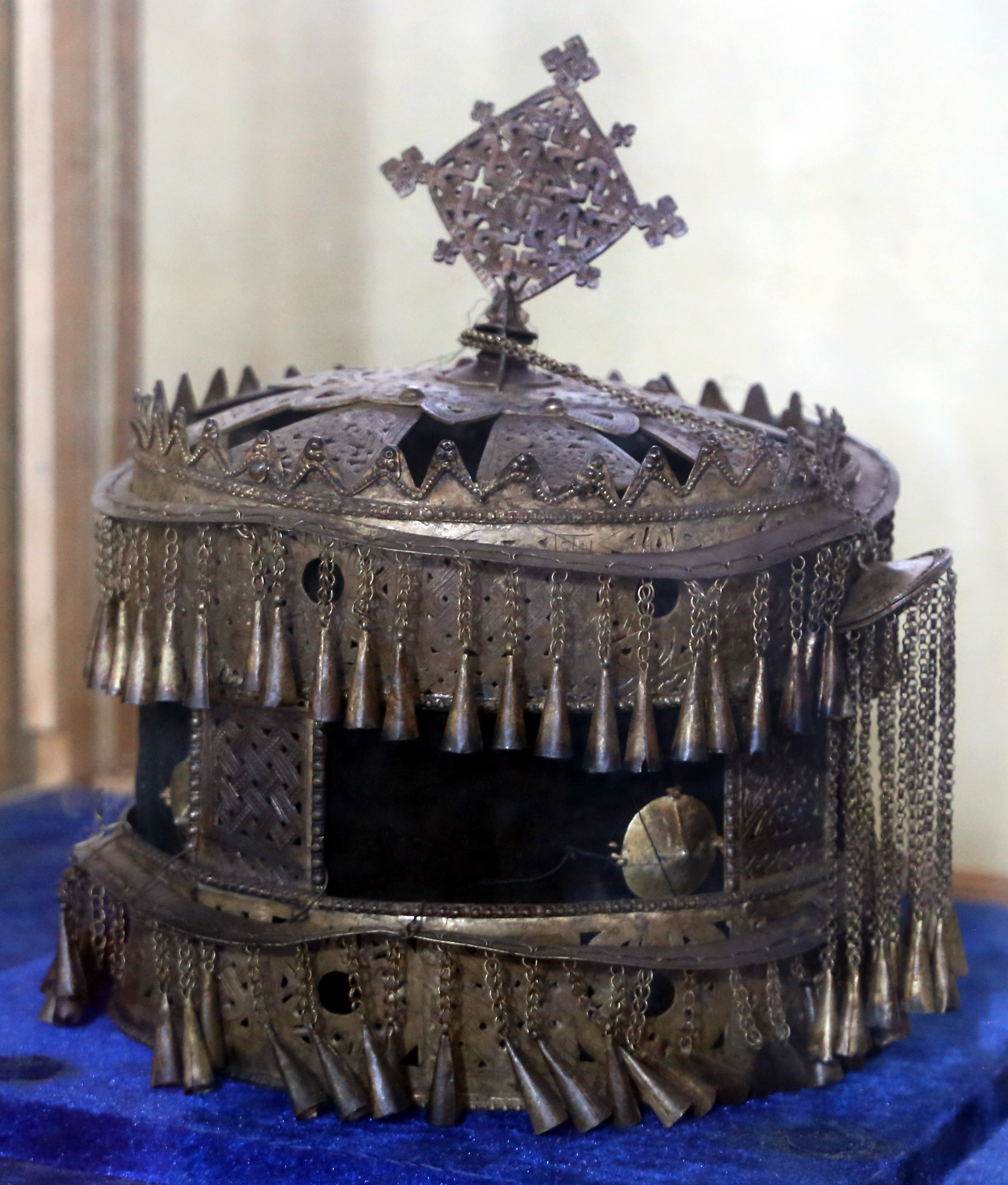
- Crown of Tekle Giyorgis I in Ura Kidane Mehret Church

Emperor of Ethiopia
- Reign: 20 July 1779 – 1784
- Predecessor: Salomon II
- Successor: Iyasu III
- Reign: 1788–1789
- Predecessor: Iyasu III
- Successor: Hezqeyas
- Reign: 1794–1795
- Predecessor: Hezeqeyas
- Successor: Baeda Maryam II
- Reign: 1795–1796
- Predecessor: Baeda Maryam II
- Successor: Salomon III
- Reign: 1798–1799
- Predecessor: Yonas
- Successor: Salomon III
- Reign: 1800 – June 1800
- Predecessor: Demetros
- Successor: Demetros
- Born: c. 1751; Tigray, Ethiopian Empire
- Died: 12 December 1817 (aged 65–66)
Regnal name
- Feqr Sagad
- Dynasty: House of Solomon
- Religion: Ethiopian Orthodox Tewahedo

Tekle Giyorgis I (Ge'ez: ተክለ ጊዮርጊስ; c. 1751 – 12 December 1817), throne name Feqr Sagad, was Emperor of Ethiopia intermittently between 20 July 1779 and June 1800, and a member of the Solomonic dynasty. He was the youngest son of Yohannes II and Woizoro Sancheviyer, and the brother of Tekle Haymanot II.

According to Sven Rubenson, who described Tekle Giyorgis as the last emperor to exercise authority on his own, "It is not without justification that he has in Ethiopian tradition received the nickname Fiṣame Mengist, 'the end of the Kingdom'". Tekle held multiple separated reigns due to quarrels against his rivals for the crown, he continually pursued to restore himself to the throne in his later life.

== Physical description ==
English explorer Nathaniel Pearce, who lived in Ethiopia during the 1810s, was acquainted with Tekle Giyorgis and described the emperor, at age 66, as

"tall, and stout in proportion, always wears his hair long and plaited; has large eyes, a Roman nose, not much beard, and a very manly and expressive countenance, though he is a great coward"
He has a dark, shining skin which is very singular, as ... [his parents and brother], were very fair
for Abyssinians ...while he, the youngest son, is as dark as mahogany. The Ras [i.e. Wolde Selassie] who knew the whole family, often remarked this, and repeated "Black without and black within."

Pearce continues his description on the next page, noting that Tekle Giyorgis

"is remarkably proud of his person: though a little bald at the top of his head, he manages to have the hair, which is nearly a span long, so plaited and disposed as to hide the bald part. He always wears silver or gold bodkin with a large head, called wolever, upon his forehead; and round the instep, and below the ancle, a string of oval silver or gold beads, such as are worn by all women rich and poor, and which are called aloo".

Then the Englishman concludes this description with an account of the former Emperor's character, by writing, "I shall begin by stating, in plain English, that he is a great liar and a great miser, and from his childhood has been remarkable for his changeable and deceitful temper, and utter disregard of his oath." Pearce illustrates this by his treatment of Wolde Gabriel, the son of Ras Mikael Sehul, who had restored him to the throne after the Rasses Ali and Meru rebelled against him: when Wolde Gabriel protested that his men were exhausted after their campaign against the rebels, and could not march forth with the Emperor to Shewa, Tekle Giyorgis conspired with his captured foes to arrest Wolde Gabriel and kept him in chains, until he had ransomed himself with "the last article of value he possessed".

== Life ==
Of Amhara descent, Tekle Giyorgis gained and lost the Imperial throne five times after Hailu Adara and Kenfu Adam had him brought down from the royal prison at Wehni and made him emperor in 1779. According to E. A. Wallis Budge, the emperor proved unpopular from the beginning, and until he was deposed for the first time on 8 February 1784 by Ras Abeto of Gojjam, he was forced at times to seek a safe haven with Ras Wolde Selassie.

However, the Royal Chronicle presents a very different picture, with the chronicler Alaqa Gabru stating that public opinion in Yebaba forced Kenfu Adam to elevate Tekle Giyorgis. In the first year of his reign he and Kenfu Adam had a falling out over the behavior of Kenfu's son-in-law Bajrond Tsadalu Egabet, who soon after his appointment was defeated in battle and had the signs of his office, the nagarit war drums, taken from him. Then an ally of Kenfu Adam, Gadlu, rebelled in Wolqayt and on 14 January 1780 the Emperor Tekle Giyorgis marched on Gadlu, putting the rebel's amba under siege and blocking access to the amba's water supply. Negotiations for Gadlu's surrender dragged on fitfully until 18 March when Gadlu fled with a small group of his men to Bergetta. At that point Tekle Giyorgis' was forced to disengage when he learned that Kenfu Adam had brought the former emperor, Salomon II, down from Wehni to be his candidate to replace Tekle Giyorgis. Tekle Giyorgis broke camp to face this threat, only to receive word that one of his other loyal nobles, Dejazmach Mebaras Boqatu, had defeated Kenfu Adam at Maryam Weha on 25 May, and both Kenfu Adam and Hailu Adara were now in custody.

Later in 1780, Kenfu Adam escaped from his imprisonment and made his way to Gojjam; Tekle Giyrogis marched from Gondar on 4 November in pursuit. By 27 June 1781 he had reached Dangila, where he learned that Kenfu Adam had been recaptured. Although Kenfu Adam and his brother Hailu Adara could have been executed for their acts instead, out of leniency, Tekle Giyorgis had them blinded.

That November, Tekle Giyrogis undertook another campaign to Wollo, with the intent of visiting Shewa and forcing its ruler, Asfa Wossen, to submit. It was during this campaign that Tekle Giyorgis ordered the construction of Debre Metmaq Maryam church in Gondar, delegating the direct management of its building to Ras Ayadar. Richard Pankhurst notes that this church is the last example of Imperial patronage in Gondar in that century.

The emperor's first step was to secure his flank against the hostile Oromo, whom he defeated at Wuchale 14 March 1782. At the same time he had to suppress a plot against him by putting Dejazmach Wolde Gabriel in chains. But once they reached the Bashilo, his men mutinied at the prospect of crossing into Shewa, and he was forced to turn back; within three weeks, he was holding court in Aringo. The tribute from Asfa Wossen which reached him months later was small compensation for this failure.

Alaqa Gabru continues Tekle Giyorgis' chronicle only until the beginning of his fifth regnal year, or mid-October 1782; from this point, the Royal chronicle is taken up with the biography of one of the warlords of the Zemene Mesafint, Hailu Eshte. The fall of Tekle Giyorgis from his throne is told tersely: Ras Ali I and Ras Haile Yosadiq conspired to depose the emperor. Tekle Giyorgis marched from Gondar to Gojjam, where he expected to deal with Ras Hailu first, but Hailu managed to evade him and cross the Abay to join Ras Ali. The emperor withdrew across the Abay to Afarwanat, where he was defeated in battle and forced to flee into exile at Ambasell. Relations between Ras Ali I soured after Tekle Giyorgis married Teshen, a daughter of Ras Gebre of Semien. Ras Ali fearing for his position, attacked the Emperor and deposed him. Tekle Giyorgis fled to his father in law in Semien.

== Second reign ==
Before Tekle Giyorgis was restored as emperor on 24 April 1788, two rivals for the throne had appeared: Iyasu and Baeda Maryam, supported by rivals of Ras Ali. Until he lost the throne 26 July 1789, Tekle Giyorgis was one of six Emperors ruling in Ethiopia in the years of 1788 and 1789 – the other three being Iyasu III, Tekle Haymanot, and Hezqeyas.

== Third reign ==
In January 1794, Tekle Giyorgis defeated the warlord Ras Haile Yosadiq, and once again was Emperor. He went to the province of Dembiya in the northwestern part of Begemder to seek the support of Dejazmach Gadlu, but the Dejazmach would not receive him; however, Ras Aligaz the brother of Ras Ali and who had a large army encamped at Chat Weha did receive him, and with his help Tekle Giyorgis was able to hold onto the throne until 15 April 1795.

== Later reigns ==
Tekle Giyorgis was restored as emperor a fourth time December 1795, and remained Emperor until 20 May 1796. His fifth period as emperor was from 4 January 1798 to 20 May 1799, and his last ran from 24 March 1800 into June of that year. He lived the rest of his life in Waldebba and Tigray.

Despite the fact that the imperial throne had little power or income, Tekle Giyorgis continued to work towards his restoration. Pearce recounts how the common wisdom, while he lived in Ethiopia, expected Ras Wolde Selassie to restore Tekle Giyorgis to the throne. He notes a meeting the former emperor and the Ras had at Axum 17 January 1814, but the Ras declined to help the former ruler. Tekle Giyorgis then left for the court of Wolde Selassie's rival, Ras Gebre, and stirred up trouble between the two until Wolde Selassie met Gebre, and was undeceived; Ras Wolde Selassie took custody of Tekle Giyorgis and afterwards exiled him to Axum, where he was kept under close watch until the death of the Ras. Having fled to Axum after the death of his patron the Ras, Pearce found the former king doing quite well in that city, selling noble titles to the victorious warlords in return for shares of their plunder; only Sabagadis refused to take a part in this trade. He died of natural causes at Axum, and was buried in the churchyard of Mariam Zion of that city.

Regnal titles
Preceded by Salomon II	Emperor of Ethiopia; 1779–1784	Succeeded by Iyasu III
Preceded by Iyasu III	Emperor of Ethiopia; 1788–1789	Succeeded by Hezqeyas
Preceded by Hezqeyas	Emperor of Ethiopia; 1794–1795	Succeeded by Baeda Maryam II
Preceded by Baeda Maryam II	Emperor of Ethiopia; 1795–1796	Succeeded by Salomon III
Preceded by Yonas	Emperor of Ethiopia; 1798–1799	Succeeded by Salomon III
Preceded by Demetros	Emperor of Ethiopia; 1800	Succeeded by Demetros
