= Hezqeyas =

Emperor of Ethiopia from 1789 to 1794

Emperor of Ethiopia
- Reign: 26 July 1789 – January 1794
- Predecessor: Tekle Giyorgis I
- Successor: Tekle Giyorgis I
- Died: 13 September 1813
- Dynasty: House of Solomon
- Father: Iyasu III

Hezqeyas (died 13 September 1813) was Emperor of Ethiopia from 26 July 1789 to January 1794, and a member of the Solomonic dynasty. He was the son of Iyasu III.

== Reign ==
Hezqeyas was brought down from the Royal prison on Wehni by Azaj Dagale and Kantiba Ayadar, who made him Emperor, while the reigning Emperor, Tekle Giyorgis, was in the field campaigning against several revolts. Tekle Giyorgis started from Aringo to suppress this threat, but the Dejazmaches Amade and Ali Borshe, with detachments of Ras Aligaz's followers, met him at the village of Salam, and tried to encircle his army; Tekle Giyorgis managed to escape and crossed over the Abay to find refuge in Gojjam. Meanwhile, one of the first acts of Hezqeyas made as emperor was to appoint Ras Haile Yosadiq governor of Gojjam and Fitawrari Ikonyan Dejazmach of Damot.

According to E. A. Wallis Budge, in the early years of his reign Hezqeyas provided a refuge for Selasse, who had raided Tigray. Hezqeyas made raids towards the frontier with Sennar, which he plundered and lay waste to. However the Royal Chronicle provides a different narrative. Shortly after his elevation Emperor Tekle Giyorgis marched on Gondar, and upon learning of his advance Hezqeyas fled from the city. When Hezqeyas reached Kemekem, he was joined there by Dejazmach Hailu Eshte, Fitawrari Ikonyan, Dejazmach Hailu Terbenos, and others; reinforced, Hezqeyas marched back to Gondar and Tekle Giyorgis abandoned the city, proceeding to Gojjam by way of Dengel Ber, where he was joined by Ras Haile Yosadiq, and together they marched on Gondar. But once there, at the last moment Tekle Giyorgis declined to engage Hezqeyas in battle and instead proceeded to Mount Wehni, where he released his relatives from the Royal prison. Hezqeyas' supporters attempted to restore him to Gondar, but found Qegnazmach Gualej had occupied it; they defeated Gualej who fled to Sar Weha.

For much of the first year of Hezqeyas' rule the Ras Betwodded Aligaz could not directly intervene to support this emperor because he had his hands full consolidating his own position: he faced armed resistance to succeeding his brother Ras Ali, including members of his own family such as Dejazmach Alula, the Fitawrari Sadiq, and the Jantirar Yasufe. When he was able to resolve these challenges, he supported the Emperor Hezqeyas by sending the Maqet Azmach Wolde Mikael to assist him. Despite this, although the majority of the great lords supported Hezqeyas, Tekle Haymanot made his own appointments from his refuge in Gojjam, undermining Hezqeyas' authority, "for the Kingdom was split in two."

The following year Tekle Giyorgis had a falling out with his primary supporter Ras Tekle Yosadiq; Tekle Giyorgis fled Gojjam, seeking the support of another noble, Dejazmach Gadlu, who refused to receive him; Tekle Giyorgis then turned to Ras Aligaz for help who responded positively, but once Tekle Haymanot arrived at Aligaz's palace at Filakit Gereger he was imprisoned at Emakina. Hezqeyas then spent the rainy season of 1790 at Filakit Gereger before returning to Gondar. The only action emperor Hezqeyas took that the chronicler felt was worth recording in 1791 was to send a general's robe to Ras Aligaz and spend the rainy season in Gondar.

It appears that in 1792 Emperor Hezqeyas acted against his primary supporter, Ras Aligaz: that year Hezqeyas, Abuna Yosab and Ichege Wolde Iyasus held a council where they declared that they will "not submit to the Galla"—a clear reference to either Aligaz or his family; the Royal Chronicle records that later that year a battle was fought near Gondar where the Emperor and the two leaders of the Ethiopian church were defeated. "And on the coming of the Galla all that was what was done." Not long after this, Haile Wand Bewossen went to Emakina and freed Tekle Giyorgis; they proceeded to Lalibela where the Emperor resided for a while, apparently mustering his supporters. When Hezqeyas heard that his rival had left Emakina, he advanced at the head of an army from Gondar, first to Tsenjana, then to the house of Dejazmach Haile Eshte where they were joined by Ras Aligaz, where they "took counsel together."

Several battles then followed, ending with Hezqeyas fleeing to Dengel Ber. The restored Emperor Tekle Giyorgis then met with his supporters to decide on their next step, but a lack of consensus led to Tekle Giyorgis going to Wegera and Dejazmach Gabriel going to Begemder late in 1793. The Royal Chronicle records that towards the end of his reign one of the warlords, Dejazmach Wolde Gabriel, entered Gondar and "made appointments and dismissals without leave of the Negus [Hezqeyas]." A few months later the disgruntled Balambaras Asserat entered the capital city to expel the Dejazmach, and in the fighting his men set fire to the Gan Takal, part of the Royal Enclosure.

Hezqeyas made one last attempt to retain the throne, before the end of 1793, entering Gondar with the support of Qegnazmach Mare'ed, Dejazmach Gugsa, and Dejazmach Aklog. However, Hezqeyas immediately returned to Ras Aligaz's camp, while Mar'ed and Aklog remained in Gondar for one more month before leaving for their provinces.

The Royal chronicle notes Hezqeyas met his son the Emperor Egwale Seyon in 1802, as he was travelling from Zage to Gondar. His son then escorted him for the rest of his journey and conducted him to the house of the Ichege. The traveler Henry Salt notes that Hezqeyas was still alive at the time of his visit to northern Ethiopia in 1809/1810.

== Notes ==
Regnal titles
Preceded by Tekle Giyorgis I	Emperor of Ethiopia; 1789–1794	Succeeded by Tekle Giyorgis I
