= Gebre =

Gebre (Gäbrä) ገብረ
- Gender: Male (given name)

Origin
- Origin: Ge'ez
- Meaning: "Servant of"
- Region of origin: Ethiopia, Eritrea

Other names
- Variant forms: Gabra, Ghebre, Ghevre
- Related names: Gebru

Gebre (Ge'ez: ገብረ, Gäbrä) is a common masculine Ethiopian and Eritrean name, meaning "servant" in Ge'ez. It is used as both a stand-alone given name and, frequently, as a prefix (or stem) in religiously themed compound names; e.g. Gebreselassie ("Servant of the Trinity"), Gebremeskel ("Servant of the Cross"), or Gebremariam ("Servant of Mary"). Gebru is a variant, often seen in Tigrinya.

As with other such compound names, when written in transliteration in a Latin script, it is often abbreviated as "G/" (e.g. G/Selassie for Gebreselassie). It may likewise also be transliterated with a hyphen or a space connecting it to the root, potentially obscuring the nature of the name.

== List of people named Gebre or variant ==
- Afevork Ghevre Jesus (1868–1947), Ethiopian writer, wrote the first novel in Amharic
- Ghebreselassie Yoseph (fl. late 20th century), Minister of Finance of Eritrea from February 1997 to 2001
- Bogaletch Gebre (195x, exact year unknown–2019), Ethiopian women's-rights activist
- Debretsion Gebremichael (fl. early 21st century), Ethiopian politician, former president of Tigray Region
- Eleni Gabre-Madhin or Eleni Zaude Gabre-Madhin, Ethiopian economist, chief executive officer of the Ethiopia Commodity Exchange (ECX)
- Gabra Manfas Qeddus, Ethiopian Christian saint, founder of the monastery of Zuqualla
- Gebregziabher Gebremariam (born 1984), Ethiopian long-distance runner
- Gebrehiwot Baykedagn – Ethiopian economist (1886–1919)
- Aleqa Gebre Hanna (fl. late 19th century), debtera of the Ethiopian Church
- Gebre Krestos (fl. 1830s), Emperor of Ethiopia
- Gebre Kristos Desta (1932–1981), Ethiopian modern artist
- Gebre Meskel Lalibela, king of Ethiopia
- Gebre Tasfa – Ethiopian governor (died 1815)
- Girma Bekele Gebre (born 1992), Ethiopian runner
- Girmawit Gebrzihair Gebru – Ethiopian long-distance runner (born 2001)
- Haile Gebrselassie (born 1973), Ethiopian athlete
- Sebhat Gebre-Egziabher (1936–2012), Ethiopian writer
- Tedros Adhanom Ghebreyesus (born 1965), Ethiopian politician, academic, and public-health authority, Director-General of the World Health Organization since 2017
- Tesfaye Gebre Kidan (1935–2004), Ethiopian general and politician
- Tewolde Berhan Gebre Egziabher (1940–2023), Ethiopian scientist
- Tewolde-Medhin Gebre-Medhin (1860–1930), Eritrean pastor, educator and translator
- Theodor Gebre Selassie (born 1986), Czech footballer
- Timnit Gebru (born 1983), Ethiopian computer scientist
- Tsadkan Gebretensae – Ethiopian military officer
- Tsegaye Gabre-Medhin or Tsegaye Gebre-Medhin (1936–2006), Ethiopian poet, playwright and essayist

== See also ==
- Gebre Guracha, town in central Ethiopia
- Gebroek
- Gibret
- Jebres
