= Salomon II of Ethiopia =

Emperor of Ethiopia from 1777 to 1779

Salomon II

Emperor of Ethiopia
- Reign: 13 April 1777 – 20 July 1779
- Predecessor: Tekle Haymanot II
- Successor: Tekle Giyorgis I
- Dynasty: House of Solomon
- Father: Abeto Adigo
- Religion: Ethiopian Orthodox Tewahedo

Salomon II (Ge'ez: ሰሎሞን) was Emperor of Ethiopia from 13 April 1777 to 20 July 1779. He was the son of Abeto Adigo. He may be identical with the Emperor Solomon whom the traveler Henry Salt lists as one of the Emperors still alive at the time of his visit in 1809/1810.

Richard Pankhurst credits him with the construction of Qeddus Fasilides ("St. Basilides," literally "Holy Basilides") church in Gondar. The chronicler Alaqa Gabru appears to suggest, in a confusing passage, that Salomon was blinded before he was deposed.

== Reign ==
Salomon was made Emperor by Ras Haile Yosadiq, Dejazmach Wand Bewossen, and Dejazmach Kenfu Adam after they deposed Tekle Haymanot II. One of Salomon's first acts as Emperor was to make a series of appointments: Ras Ayadar became the Ras Betwoded, Kenfu Adam governor of Damot, Wand Bewsossen governor of Begemder, Dejazmach Hailu Adara governor of Gojjam, Dejazmach Hailu Eshte governor of Semien, and Basha Mebaras Boqatu deputy to the Blattengeta.

Despite the consensus of the major nobles of the Empire to support Salomon, Azaj Salassie Barya brought Tekle Giyorgis from the royal prison on Wehni as a pretender to the throne. Salomon responded by marching out from Gondar; Tekle Giyorgis then fled to Tigray, whence he emerged in the month of Sane at the head of an army which was rumored to be "a large force". Tekle Giyorgis was defeated outside of Gondar and once again confined at Wehni.

This victory was followed, however, with a battle at Sabisabar between Ras Haile Yosadiq and Kenfu Adam. Kenfu Adam was victorious, and Emperor Salomon, who was with Ras Haile Yosadiq, was captured by Kenfu Adam and became Kenfu's figurehead. Salomon shortly afterwards convinced Dejazmach Hailu Eshte to join forces with him and Kenfu; the Dejazmach did so after peace was first established between the two enemies. Together the allies raided Filakit Gereger, then the capital of Begemder province; Boqatu, who had succeeded his brother Wand Bewossen as governor on the latter's death, was forced to flee his palace in Felakit Gereger.

Not long after a second battle was fought against Boqatu, which went badly for Salomon and his supporters. Kenfu Adam and Hailu Adara then conspired to make Tekle Giyorgis emperor and brought him down from Wehni once again. Kenfu Adam went to Dera, against the wishes of Emperor Salomon, then attempted to seize Ras Hailu Yosadiq but failed; peace was made between them. At this point, Kenfu took both the Emperor and Tekle Giyorgis to his province of Damot, and on 17 July 1779 at Yebaba proclaimed Tekle Giyorgis the new emperor and announced that Salomon had become a monk.

The latest chronological mention of Salomon in the Royal chronicle is when Emperor Tekle Giyorgis learned on 25 March 1780 that Kenfu Adam had brought Salomon down from Wehni to replace him as Emperor. However Kenfu Adam was defeated in battle 25 May at Maryam Weha by Boqatu, leading Kenfu Adam to being imprisoned and Salomon presumably returned to the Royal prison on Wehni.

== Notes ==
Regnal titles
Preceded by Tekle Haymanot II	Emperor of Ethiopia; 1777–1779	Succeeded by Tekle Giyorgis I
