= Tekle Haymanot II =

Emperor of Ethiopia from 1769 to 1777

Emperor of Ethiopia
- Reign: 18 October 1769 – August 1770
- Predecessor: Yohannes II
- Successor: Susenyos II
- Reign: December 1770 – 13 April 1777
- Predecessor: Susenyos II
- Successor: Salomon II
- Born: 1754
- Died: 7 September 1777 (aged 22–23)
- Dynasty: House of Solomon
- Father: Yohannes II
- Mother: Sancheviyar
- Religion: Ethiopian Orthodox Tewahedo

Tekle Haymanot II (Ge'ez: ተክለ ሃይማኖት), throne name: Admas Sagad III (Ge'ez: አድማስ ሰገድ; 1754 – 7 September 1777) was Emperor of Ethiopia from 18 October 1769, when he ascended the throne at the age of 15, until 13 April 1777. He was the son of Yohannes II by Woizero Sancheviyar, born at the Imperial prison of Mount Wehni.

The Scottish explorer James Bruce (who was in Ethiopia from September 1769 to November 1771) described his appearance as follows:

He was a prince of a most graceful figure, tall for his age, rather thin, and of the whitest shade of Abyssinian colour, for such are all those princes that are born in the mountain. He was not so dark in complexion as a Neapolitan or Portuguese, had a remarkably fine forehead, large black eyes, but which had something very stern in them, a straight nose, rather of the largest, thin lips, and small mouth, very white teeth and long hair. His features, even in Europe, would have been thought fine. He was particularly careful of his hair, which he dressed in a hundred different ways. He had an excellent understanding, and prudence beyond his years. He was said to be naturally of a very warm temper, but this he had so perfectly subdued, as scarcely ever to have given an instance of it in public. He entered into Ras Michael's views entirely, and was as forward to march out against Fasil, as his father had been averse to it.

—

== Reign ==
Tekle Haymanot became Emperor at the age of 15 when his father Yohannes was killed by Ras Mikael Sehul, the aged warlord of Tigray. He lost the throne briefly in 1770 when he and Ras Mikael left the capital city of Gondar for Tigray, and Susenyos II was made Emperor by rival warlords in Gondar, but regained it when Ras Mikael returned to Gondar on 23 December of that year.

Upon returning to the capital, Ras Mikael immediately killed a troop of travelling actors who had performed a satire of him. A number of former rebels, who had switched sides, brought to him a number of prisoners, including the Aqabe sa'at Abba Salama; after a show trial, Ras Mikael had them brutally executed. In the days that followed, Ras Mikael wrought his vengeance on all who had opposed him; as James Bruce wrote:

Fifty-seven people died publicly by the hand of the executioner in the course of a few days; many disappeared, and were either murdered privately, or sent to prisons, no one knew where. The bodies of those killed by the sword were hewn to pieces and scattered about the streets, being denied burial. I was miserable, and almost driven to despair, at seeing my hunting dogs, twice let loose by the carelessness of my servants, bringing into the courtyard the head and arms of killed men … the quantity of carrion, and the stench of it, brought down the hyaenas in hundreds from the neighbouring mountains; and, as few people in Gondar go out after dark, they enjoyed the streets to themselves, and seemed ready to dispute the possession of the city with the inhabitants.

The next year saw Ras Mikael Sehul defeated in the Three battles of Sarbakusa against his adversaries near Teda in May, which forced the Ras to retreat to Gondar, where he surrendered to Wand Bewossen on 4 June 1771. Wand Bewossen imprisoned Ras Mikael for a year, then sent him back to Tigray to live out his last years as governor of that province. Emperor Tekle Haymanot managed to avoid his mentor's fate at that time, and Wand Bewossen only brought him into his power when the warlord surprised him at Qaroda, capturing him while he and his men were eating. Yet Wand Bewossen's control of the Ethiopian government was short-lived; he was defeated in 1772 by the coalition of Fasil, Ras Goshu, and Dejazmach Hailu Eshte at Checheho and forced to retreat to Lasta.

Over the subsequent years, Tekle Haymanot struggled against the shifting conflicts between the four paramount nobles of Ethiopia—Fasil, Ras Goshu, Hailu Eshte, and Wand Bewossen—who would form alliances against each other, only to break them and join with their former enemies whenever it was to their immediate benefit. Wand Bewossen went as far as to bring Tekle Giyorgis I down from Wehni as his candidate for emperor; Tekle Haymanot managed to defeat Wand Bewossen at Emakina and returned Tekle Giyorgis to the Imperial prison.

Weary of the continuing power struggles with his nobles, and after a final conference with Ras Haile Yosadiq, Wand Bewossen and Kenfu Adam failed to gain a plausible promise of their support for his rule, he repudiated the throne 13 April 1777. Tekle Haymanot became a monk and lived as a hermit in Waldebba, where he died a few months later.

Despite this political turmoil, art and scholarship flourished in Gondar. Richard Pankhurst credits the construction of seven churches built in or near that city as being built during his reign. The most important was Ba'eta Maryam, built in 1775, which originally had a large bronze cross on its roof that towered over all of Gondar; the others include: Qeddus Qirqos (dedicated to St. Cyriacus), Qeddus Petros we Pawlos (dedicated to Ss. Peter and Paul), Farta Lideta ("the Nativity of Mary") at Farta, Yohannes Wolde Nagwadgwad (dedicated to St. John the Evangelist), Abajale Tekle Haymanot (dedicated to St. Tekle Haymanot), and Debre Tibab ("the Mount of Knowledge").

Regnal titles
Preceded by Yohannes II	Emperor of Ethiopia; 1769–1770	Succeeded by Susenyos II
Preceded by Susenyos II	Emperor of Ethiopia; 1770–1777	Succeeded by Salomon II
