= Filakit =

Filakit, (Amharic: ፍላቂት) is a town in northern Ethiopia. The town sometimes called as Filakit Geregera. Filakit is located in the North Wollo Zone of the Amhara Region, it has a latitude and longitude of 11°45′N 38°45′E and an elevation of 2865 meters above sea level. The town is the administrative center of Meket woreda. Filakit Geregera town has two kebeles, Kebele 01 (Filakit) and Kebele 02 (Geregera) which are serving mainly as government administrative and business towns respectively.

== History ==
One of the earliest mentions of Gereger is in the Royal Chronicle of Susenyos, where the Emperor stopped during his campaign against the rebel Yona'el in 1620. The Emperor Yohannes I also alighted in this town while returning to Aringo, which he reached 11 December 1677.

During the later 18th century, Filakit Gereger served as the capital of Begemder, and was where Ras Ali died in 1788.

By 1964, Gereger was the administrative center of Shedeho Mekiet woreda.

== Demographics ==
Based on figures from the Central Statistical Agency in 2005, Filakit Gereger has an estimated total population of 5,517 of whom 2,623 are men and 2,894 are women. The 1994 census reported this town had a total population of 3,194 of whom 1,380 were men and 1,814 were women
