= Zewde =

Zewde or Zewdie is a male given name of Ethiopian origin that may refer to:

- Alem Zewde Tessema (died 1974), Ethiopian military figure
- Sahle-Work Zewde, 5th President of Ethiopia
- Terefe Maregu Zewdie (born 1982), Ethiopian long-distance runner
- Hailu Zewde (born 1974), Ethiopian male middle-distance runner at the 1992 Summer Olympics
- Zewdie Hailemariam (born 1962 or 1972), Ethiopian female middle-distance runner at the 1992 Summer Olympics
