= Baeda Maryam II =

Emperor of Ethiopia in 1795

Emperor of Ethiopia
- Reign: 15 April – December 1795
- Predecessor: Tekle Giyorgis I
- Successor: Tekle Giyorgis I
- Dynasty: House of Solomon
- Father: Salomon II
- Religion: Ethiopian Orthodox Tewahedo

Baeda Maryam II was Emperor of Ethiopia from 15 April to December 1795. He may have been the son of Salomon II. Although E. A. Wallis Budge, in his book A History of Ethiopia: Nubia and Abyssinia, notes some authorities believe Baeda Maryam was the same person as Salomon III, Nathaniel Pearce, who met the former Emperor when he visited Ras Wolde Selassie 20 January 1813, states that he had been Emperor only once, for nine months.

== Reign ==
Pearce provides a short account of Baeda Maryam's reign. He had been made Emperor by Dejazmach Wolde Gabriel, and after he was deposed by Ras Aligaz, Baeda Maryam found refuge with Ras Guebra. The Royal chronicle provides further details: when Emperor Tekle Giyorgis I was absent from Gondar raiding near Shawra, Baeda Maryam was proclaimed emperor over the protests of Abuna Yosab III and the Ichege. At the same time Wolde Gabriel was elevated to Ras and Betwodded. However, according to the Royal chronicle Baeda Maryam found little support beyond Wolde Gabriel: not long after his coronation, retainers of Ras Guebra at Shawada and Mosabit clashed with the retainers of Wolde Gabriel; Dejazmach Wolde Selassie appeared to support Baeda Maryam as emperor, but he sent a secret message to Dejazmach Haile Wand Bewossen of support. Both Ras Wolde Gabriel and Emperor Baeda Maryam campaigned in the provinces in a show of strength, but by the rainy season Baeda Maryam had returned to Gondar.

Towards the end of 1795, Dejazmach Haile Wand Bewossen marched from Lasta, supported by Oromo from Wollo, and defeated Wolde Gabriel in battle at Felaqit Saturday 8 Teqemt. Wolde Gabriel retreated towards the Checheho pausing at Maryam Weha and his enemies at Agala. When Wolde Gabriel attempted to retire towards Sabisabar, he was attacked and defeated once again at Tsanfa Gumara. Wolde Gabriel withdrew to Quratsa, where the monks made peace between him and Haile Wand Bewossen. Wolde Gabriel then went to the monastery at Mahdere Maryam while Haile marched on Gondar, where he summoned Tekle Giyorgis to resume the throne.

By 1802, Baeda Maryam was reportedly a prisoner in Semien. By January 1813, he was still in Semien, at which time he visited Ras Wolde Selassie to seek his help in being restored to the throne, but the Ras declined to help. Pearce later notes that Wolde Selassie was thought to be supporting the claims of another former Emperor, Tekle Giyorgis, but did not act because "he is persuaded to wait for the Abuna from Egypt and take him with him."

== Notes ==
Regnal titles
Preceded by Tekle Giyorgis I	Emperor of Ethiopia; 1795	Succeeded by Tekle Giyorgis I
