= Mikael Sehul =

Nobleman and central figure of Zemene Mesafint in Ethiopia (1692–1784)

- Ras
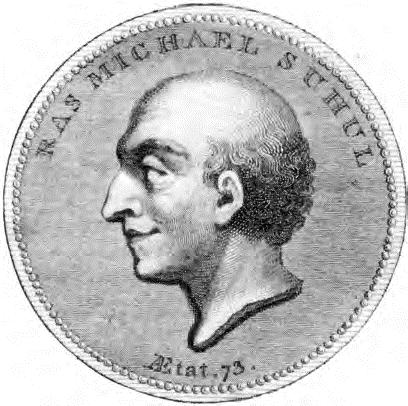
- Ras Mikael Sehul purported burst coin

Governor of Tigray Province
- Reign: 1748–1784
- Predecessor: probably Takle
- Successor: Wolde Selassie
- Born: Blatta Mikael; 1692; Naeder, Tigray Province, Ethiopian Empire
- Died: 1784 (aged 91–92)
- Issue: Ras Faris the Great
- Father: Abeto Hezeqeyas Wolde Hawaryot
- Mother: Woizero Ishate Mariam
- Religion: Ethiopian Orthodox Tewahedo

Mikael Sehul (born Blatta Mikael; 1692 – 1784) was a nobleman who ruled Ethiopia for a period of 25 years as regent of a series of emperors. He was also a Ras or governor of Tigray 1748–71 and again from 1772 until his death. He was a major political figure during the reign of Emperor Iyasu II and his successors until almost the time of his death.

The Scottish explorer James Bruce met Mikael during his stay in Ethiopia, and recorded the following description of the Ras when he granted Bruce an audience:

"We went in, and saw the old man sitting upon a sofa; his white hair was dressed in many short curls. He appeared to be thoughtful, but not displeased; his face was lean, his eyes quick and vivid, but seemed to be a little sore from exposure to the weather. he seemed to be about six feet high, though his lameness made it difficult to guess with accuracy. His air was perfectly free from constraint, what the French call degagée. In face and person he was liker my learned and worthy friend, the Count de Buffon, than any two men I ever saw in the world. They must have been bad physiognomists that did not discern his capacity and understanding by his very countenance. Every look conveyed a sentiment with it: he seemed to have no occasion for other language, and indeed spoke little."

== Biography ==
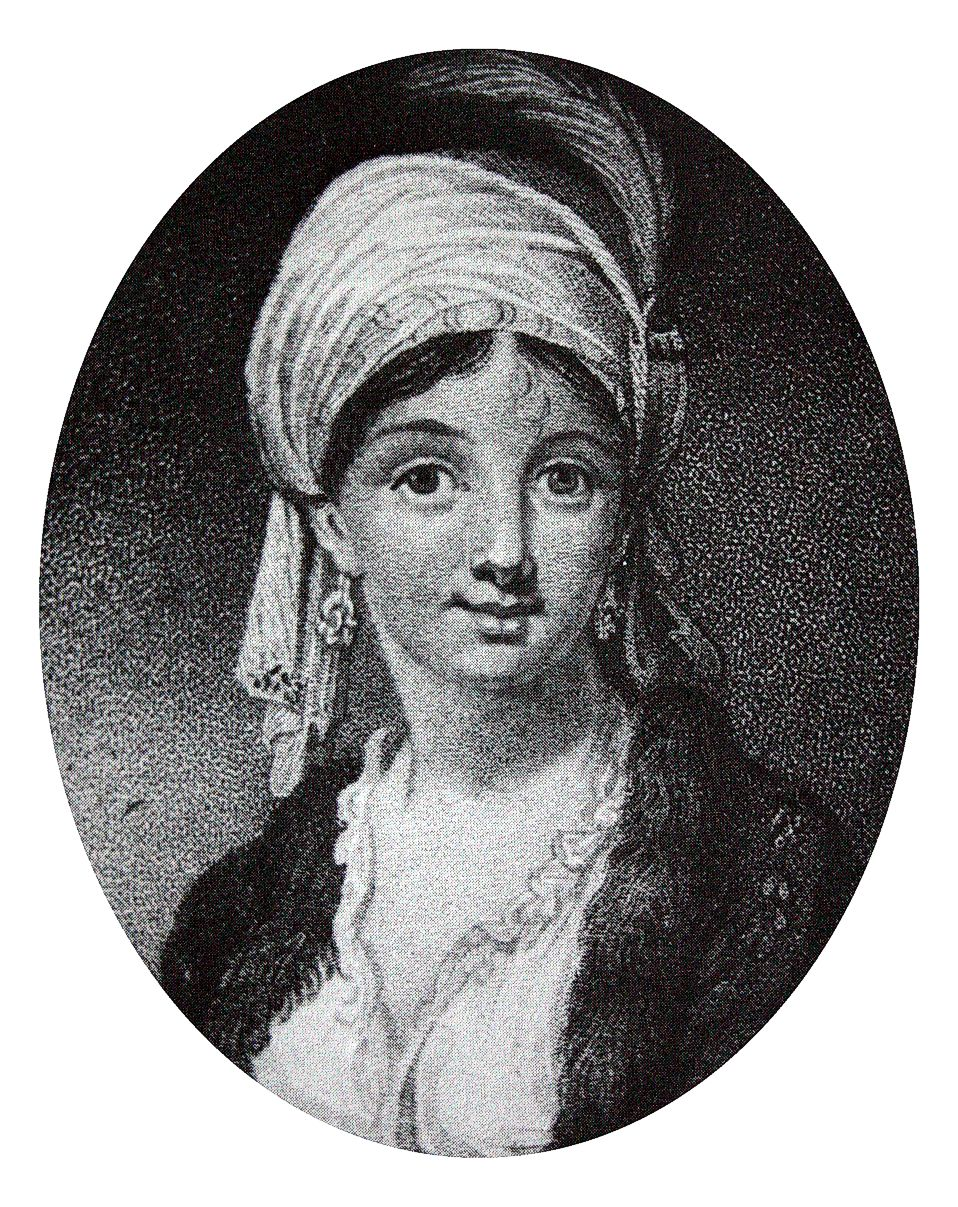
Princess Aster of Gondar

Mikael was born to Abeto Hezeqeyas Wolde Hawaryot and Woizero Ishate Mariam, the daughter of Azzaz Yakub in the district of Na'eder. Both of his parents claimed descent from the Solomonic dynasty through his ancestor Ras Faris the Great, and his father used the title Abeto, a prince of imperial cadet line. Mikael's first official wife was WoizeroWalatta Gabr'el (died at Adwa after 1766); his second was Princess Aster, daughter of Empress Mentewab.

Sehul first enters history as having played a part in some of the difficulties that were experienced by the delegation sent to Cairo to obtain a new Abuna (bishop) for the empire in 1745. On their outbound trip, the party had been held up at Massawa by the local Naib for six months, and only released them after they gave him half of their funds. On the return trip, Abuna Yohannes was held for ransom at Arqiqo until the abbot of the monastery of Debre Bizen helped him to escape. This affront was too serious to be overlooked, and the then Dejazmach Mikael was subjected to a punitive campaign by the Emperor Iyasu II. However Dejazmach Mikael remained too powerful, and he was soon forgiven.

Dejazmach Mikael was offended by the behavior of his superior Ras Anda Haymanot king of Midre Bahri during a hunting expedition, and returned to Adwa which he fortified, and rebelled from Anda Haymanot. Eventually Mikael fought, captured, then executed his one-time master in 1759. Adwa was located at a strategic point on the trade route between Massawa and Gondar, and from the fees and duties he extracted he was able to recruit an army of 8000 men and arm them with muskets.

During the reign of Iyasu II's successor Iyoas I, Dejazmach Mikael found himself the beneficiary of two dynastic ties to the Imperial house: Empress Mentewab in 1769 married him to her daughter Aster, and Mikael's son, Wolde Hawaryat, was married to another daughter of the Empress, Altash. It was at this time that Mikael was granted the title of Ras.

Upon the death of Iyasu II, his son Iyoas took the throne and rivalry exploded between the mother of the late Emperor and his widow. Empress Mentewab had been crowned co-ruler when her then underage son had succeeded her husband. Now that her son was gone, she believed that she was entitled to remain as co-ruler. However, Iyasu's widow, Welete Bersabe (known as Wubit), strongly believed that it was her turn to take the leading role at the court of her son Iyoas as her mother-in-law had done during the previous reign. The young Emperor took the side of his mother against his grandmother. Empress Mentewab gathered her relatives from her native Qwara and their forces flooded into Gondar to support her claims. When news of the arrival of the Qwaran troops arrived, Welete Bersabe also summoned her relatives from Yejju, and throngs of soldiers arrived from that district to uphold her claims. The city of Gondar was swamped by these two tense armies, and a bloodbath seemed imminent.

To resolve the standoff, Empress Mentewab looked to her son-in-law Ras Mikael to intervene. Mikael Sehul arrived with an army of 26,000 promising to mediate the dispute between the two queens and their followers. He took control of the capital city of Gondar and assumed an increasingly dominant role.

On 22 January 1768, Mikael was made Ras Bitwodad and Enderase of the Empire. His growing power alarmed Emperor Iyoas, and after secretly exchanging messages with Fasil the Emperor ordered Ras Mikael to return to Tigray. The Ras disobeyed and defeated Fasil's army. He returned to Gondar and demanded an assembly of the nobility so Ras Mikael Sehul could show his proof that the Emperor Iyoas had plotted to have him killed while he was defending his throne for him.

The assembly was presented with testimony, and agreed that it was a grievous crime, deserving of death. However, Ethiopian law stated that a monarch could not be killed, so they merely confined the Emperor to his palace. Mikael Sehul then ordered the Emperor killed; as it was considered wrong to pierce the heir of Solomon with a spear, cut him with a sword, or to strike him with bullets, Mikael Sehul ordered the Emperor strangled with a length of silk in imperial red in January 1769. This murder of Emperor Iyoas I devastated both dowager queens, Empresses Mentewab and Welete Bersabe, and Mentewab secluded herself at her palace at Qusquam where she buried her grandson with much pomp and grandeur, never again participating in state affairs which she had run since the death of her husband Emperor Bakaffa. Empress Welete Bersabe retired to Yejju in her grief, but her Yejju relatives would later return to prominence seizing the regency in subsequent reigns. Some historians date the beginning of the "Zemene Mesafint" era of the decline of the monarchy and the rise of the regional aristocracy and the fragmentation of state power, to the murder of Emperor Iyoas I at the order of Mikael Sehul.

Ras Mikael then appointed the next two emperors: Yohannes II, who proved to be a nonentity and was quickly gotten rid of; then Tekle Haymanot II. Despite his power over the throne, the populace rebelled; Ras Mikael responded with a reign of terror over Gondar (1770), but failed to control the countryside where the armies of Fasil, Goshu of Amhara, and Wand Bewossen of Begemder allied to fight him. The parties met south of Teda in the Three battles of Sarbakusa; Ras Mikael was defeated and surrendered to Wand Bewossen on 4 June 1771. Wand Bewossen imprisoned Mikael Sehul for a year, then either sent him back to Tigray to live out his last years as governor of that province, or Ras Mikael voluntarily retired to that province.

He was succeeded, each briefly, by his son Wolde Samuel of Tigray, then by his grandson Wolde Gabriel, and by his nephew Gabre Maskal who lost to Ras Wolde Selassie of Enderta.

Ras Mikael intervened in the Ethiopian Church, and was a champion of the Karva Haymanot doctrine.
