= Wolde Selassie =

Ethiopian governor (1736–1816)

Governor of the Tigray province
- Reign: 1788 – 18 May 1816
- Predecessor: Mikael Sehul
- Successor: Sabagadis Woldu
- Born: 1736; Enderta, Tigray Province, Ethiopian Empire
- Died: 28 May 1816 (aged 79–80); Antalo, Enderta, Tigray Province, Ethiopian Empire
- Burial: Selassie Monastery, Chalaqot, Tigray Province
- Father: Dejazmach Kefla Iyasus

Wolde Selassie (Tigrinya: ወልደሥላሴ; c.1736 – 28 May 1816) was Ras of the Tigray province between 1788 and 1816, and Regent of the Ethiopian Empire between 1797 and 1800. John J. Halls, in his Life and Correspondence of Henry Salt, preserves a description of this powerful warlord, as "small in stature, and delicately formed, quick in his manner, with a shrewd expression, and considerable dignity in his deportment." Nathaniel Pearce also notes that Ras Wolde was an avid chess player, and "would play at from morning till night".

== Life ==
Wolde Selassie, who descended from the nobility of Antalo in Enderta, emerged as the ruler of Tigray, Hamasien and Mareb Melash (Eritrea) after years of fighting; Nathaniel Pearce describes an encounter where he made a name for himself by single-handedly slaying the brothers Abel and Cail, "two of Ras Michael's choice men" who were sent by Michael to kill Wolde Selasse. Despite the fact Ras Mikael Sehul was so impressed at this act of bravery that he tried to make peace with him, but Wolde Selassie remembered how the older man had killed his father, and until the old Ras died he spent his years in exile in Wollo and Gojjam.

Wolde Gabriel, grandson of Ras Mikael, attempted to crush Wolde Selassie when the later was in Wogera, but according to Pearce after besieging Wolde Selassie for 20 days Wolde Gabriel came off the worse, and made peace by proclaiming him Balgadda, or governor of the salt-making districts. After Wolde Gabriel's death in battle against Ras Aligaz of Yejju the then Imperial regent of Abyssinia, Wolde Selassie petitioned Emperor Tekle Giyorgis for the governorship of his kingdom, Enderta, but the Emperor "according to his usual bad faith" made another warlord, Ras Gebre Masqal, governor of Enderta instead. Wolde Selassie then quickly marched forth with a smaller army against the Ras, which he defeated, then entered Gebre Masqal's camp and took the Ras prisoner. Shortly afterwards he marched on Gondar. The two Emperors, Tekle Haymanot and Tekle Giyorgis bestowed Wolde-Sillasie the titles of both Ras and Bitwoded of the Abyssinian empire in 1790.

Wolde Selassie made his seat of government in Chalacot, but maintained his capital at Antalo in Enderta Province. He built four palaces, at Chelekot, Antalo, Felegdaro and Mekelle, all in Enderta. He played a role in the politics of the Imperial Throne, in part by providing shelter to Emperor Tekle Giyorgis I in 1799 and 1800, and was visited by the former Emperor Baeda Maryam in 1813. Although at first he cooperated with Ras Aligaz, the Imperial Regent, after his power grew, Wolde Selassie came to challenge Aligaz for that office prior to Aligaz's death in 1803. The first years of the 19th century were disturbed by fierce campaigns between Ras Gugsa of Begemder, and Ras Wolde Selassie of Tigray, who fought over control of the figurehead Emperor Egwale Seyon. Wolde Selassie was eventually the victor, and practically ruled the whole country as Enderase till his death in 1816.

Wolde Selassie, a conservative Christian who greatly valued Ethiopia's monarchical traditions, hated the Yeju parvenus. He hit out at them by effectively conquering the Azebo and Raya and by taking control over all the important passes in Lasta leading to Tigray. He then turned his attention to the coast, slowly but surely imposing his suzerainty over the Muslim authorities there until he finally could control and tax their trade inland; he used the revenues, to train, reform and re-equip his army and when the 19th century opened, Wolde Selassie was by far Abyssinia's leading figure and certainly the main champion of the Solomonic tradition. Ras Wolde Selassie was known to have had wielded the most power during his reign, exceeding formidable rases such as Ras Aligaz of Yejju, Ras Gugsa of Gojam and the Yejju chieftain Gojje; and throughout his vast provinces and districts, all kinds of crimes, grievances, rebellions, disputes and inheritances were directly referred to him and most wars were carried by himself in person.

According to Paul Henze, Ras Wolde Selassie was the first ruler of this period to have close contact with Europeans, hosting three British diplomats, George Annesley, Viscount Valentia, his secretary Henry Salt, and Pearce. Salt's arrival in Abyssinia culminated in the signing of a treaty of friendship with Wolde Selassie representing Abyssinia and the former representing Great Britain in 1805. Henry Salt also proposed inaugurating trade with Britain; Wolde Selassie was quick to see possible advantages in relations with Britain and promised to encourage such commerce with every means in his power. Revealing himself a realist, and speaking, Salt says, with "great sincerity", he nevertheless expressed the fear that his country might not be able to supply any quantity of valuable commodities sufficient to recompense our merchants for engaging in so precarious a trade; more especially as the Abyssinians were not much acquainted with commercial transactions...Could any plan, however, be arranged for obviating these difficulties...he would most readily concur in carrying it into effect.

Wolde Selassie also touched on a major obstacle that the Ethiopians had faced, the Egyptians had control over the port of Massawa which they acquired from the Ottoman Empire and reminded King George that with their "naval superiority in the red sea" Abyssinia might find it difficult to gain access to the port. Wolde-Sillasie's effort however, did bear fruit in the long term when his successors Dejazmatch Wube of Semien and Tigray and Emperor Yohannes of Ethiopia followed up on the treaty that was struck between him and the kingdom of Britain.

Nathaniel Pearce lived with Ras Wolde from about 1808 and the warlord's death. Pearce's diary of his stay is not only valuable for the history of this period, but also provides enormous detail about daily life in Ethiopia.

After a period of internal wars in Tigray province, a half-Tigrayan, half-Irob warlord Sabagadis Woldu was victorious and became the new lord of the province in 1822.

== Reputation ==
At the effort of Ras Wolde Selassie, Ethiopia received its first Abuna, or titular religious leader, from Egypt since the death of Yosab in 1804: Qerellos III (1816–1828), who made his residence in Antalo.

The British diplomat Henry Salt described Wolde-Sillasie as "distinguished still more for his intrepidity and firmness than by the policy with which he has uniformly ruled the country under his command; having been successfully engaged in upwards of forty battles, and having evinced on these occasions even too great a disregard of his own personal safety in action." Another British traveller, Mansfield Parkyns adds, “Wolde Selasie reigned for twenty-five years, and during this long period obtained and maintained for himself the character of a good and wise prince”.

== Family and descendants ==
Ras Wolde Selassie was the son of Dejazmach Kefla Iyasus, governor of Enderta province, and his wives included Mentewab (died 1812 from smallpox), the sister of Emperor Egwale Seyon; and Sahin, the daughter of Emperor Tekle Giyorgis I. His brothers included Dejazmach Bilaten-Geta Mennase, Sebhato (Sevatu), Dejazmach Debbab, the great-grandfather of Emperor Yohannes IV, and Ato Gabre Massea (youngest brother of Wolde Selassie, and son of Kefla Iyasus, by another wife). had a son called Gebre Egziabher 1801

The Ras died at the age of 80 due to natural causes at his residence in Hintalo, Enderta.,
