= Iyasu III =

Emperor of Ethiopia from 1784 to 1788

Emperor of Ethiopia
- Reign: 16 February 1784 – 24 April 1788
- Predecessor: Tekle Giyorgis I
- Successor: Salomon III
- Dynasty: House of Solomon
- Father: Abeto Azequ
- Religion: Ethiopian Orthodox Tewahedo

Iyasu III was Emperor of Ethiopia from 16 February 1784 to 24 April 1788, and a member of the Solomonic dynasty. His throne name was Ba'ala Segab. He was the son of Abeto Azequ, and the grandson of Iyasu II.

== Reign ==
He was set upon the throne by a number of high nobles, and after the generals swore their allegiance to him in the presence of the Abuna Yosab and the Ichege, Iyasu made a number of promotions foremost of which were: Qegnazmach Tsadalu was made Ras Betwodded, Ras Haile Yosadiq governor of Gojjam and the Agaw, Balambaras Ali Dejazmach of Begemder, and Dejazmach Wolde Gabriel was released from his chains and made Dajazmach of Tigray. His reign of four years was disrupted by feuds between Wolde Selassie, Ras Haile Yosadiq, and others.

According to E.A. Wallis Budge, one of the governors deposed Iyasu, who shortly afterwards died from smallpox. However, according to the contemporary account of the Royal chronicle, not long after Dejazmach Ali brought Tekle Giyorgis I back from exile at Ambassel and restored him to the throne, Ras Haile Yosadiq marched from Gojjam on Gondar, intending to restore Iyasu. Although Ras Haile entered the city with his candidate, Tekle Giyorgis having carefully fled beforehand, when Dejazmach Ali responded by marching on Gondar, Ras Haile abandoned Iyasu, and Dejazmach Guebra was forced to escort Iyasu to safety in Tigray. After the defeat of Ras Haile Yosadiq's alliance at Madab later in 1788, one of the individuals captured by the victorious Dejazmach Ali was Iyasu. In any case, according to Henry Salt, Iyasu had died by 1810.

== Notes ==
Regnal titles
Preceded by Tekle Giyorgis I	Emperor of Ethiopia; 1784–1788	Succeeded by Tekle Giyorgis I
