= Emperor of Ethiopia =

Title of the ruling monarch of Ethiopia from 1270 to 1974/1975

- ዐፄ
- Imperial
- Imperial coat of arms

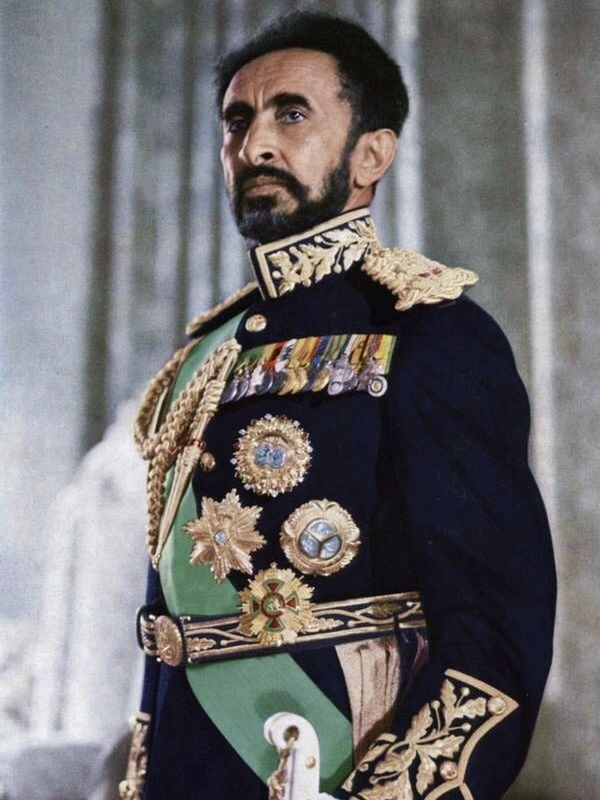
- Longest and last to reign Haile Selassie; 2 April 1930 – 12 September 1974

Details
- Style: His Imperial Majesty
- First monarch: Menelik I (Mythical); Yekuno Amlak (Historical)
- Last monarch: Haile Selassie
- Formed: 1270 AD
- Abolished: 21 March 1975
- Residence: Menelik Palace
- Appointer: Hereditary
- Pretenders: Zera Yacob Amha Selassie; Girma Yohannes Iyasu

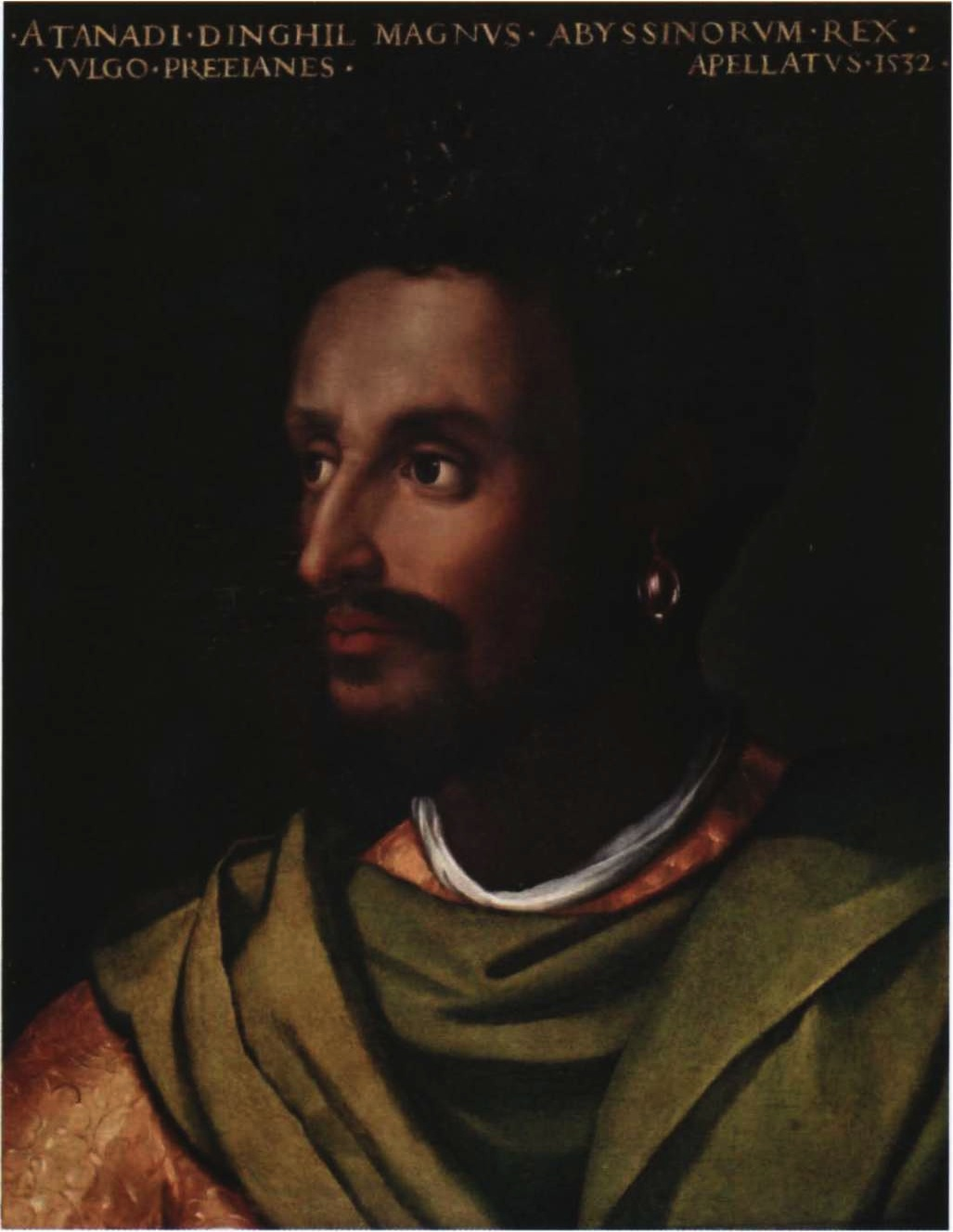
Lebna Dengel, nəgusä nägäst (emperor) of Ethiopia and a member of the Solomonic dynasty.

The emperor of Ethiopia (Ge'ez: ንጉሠ ነገሥት, romanized: nəgusä nägäst, "King of Kings"), also known as the Atse (Amharic: ዐፄ, "emperor"), was the hereditary ruler of the Ethiopian Empire, from at least the 13th century until the abolition of the monarchy in 1975. The emperor was the head of state and head of government, with ultimate executive, judicial and legislative power in that country. A National Geographic article from 1965 called Imperial Ethiopia "nominally a constitutional monarchy; in fact it was a benevolent autocracy".

== Title and style ==
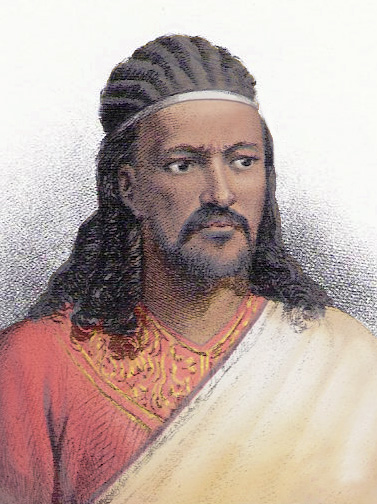
Emperor Tewodros II (1855–1868)

The title "King of Kings", often rendered imprecisely in English as "emperor," dates back to ancient Mesopotamia, but was used in Axum by King Sembrouthes (c. AD 250). However, Yuri Kobishchanov dates this usage to the period following the Persian victory over the Romans in 296–297. The most notable pre-Solomonic usage of the title Nəgəsä Nägäst was by Ezana of Axum. Despite this, prior to the beginning of the Solomonic Dynasty, most Axumite and Zagwe rulers went by negus. Ezana conquered Meroë, capital of the Kushites, after which he assumed the title of "King of Ethiopia" prior to the rise of the medieval Ethiopian Empire. This practice would continue into the modern period.

The Ge'ez predecessor to the title Atse, recorded in Arabic by Ibn Hawqal as Haḍani, was Haṣ́ani, which would later become Hatse. The Emperors at least from the time of Yekuno Amlak were thus known as Hatse in the region. In 1436 Ibn Taghribirdi wrote a passage referring to the emperor as the "Lord of Amhara, the Hatse, the Abyssinian King, the infidel and the Lord of the Amhara in Abyssinia."

Its use meant that both subordinate officials and tributary rulers, notably the gubernatorial vassals of Gojjam (who ranked 12th in the states non-dynastic protocol as per 1690), Welega, the seaward provinces and later Shewa, received the honorific title of nəgus, a word for "king."

The consort of the emperor was referred to as the ətege. Empress Zewditu used the feminized form Nəgəstä Nägäst ("Queen of Kings") to show that she reigned in her own right, and did not use the title of ətege.

== Succession ==
On the death of a monarch any male or female descendant of the various dynastic lines could claim succession to the throne. Though in many cases the practice favoured primogeniture for at least one subsequent succession to the imperial throne, it often, as in the case of Emperor Yohannes IV of Tigray's claim to the throne after the death of Emperor Tewodros II from Gondar, would leave the direct lineage of one royal family in favor of another.

The system developed two approaches to controlling the succession: the first involved the selection of emperors by a council of vassal regional royals and powerful clergy members from throughout the country who supported their claim to the Imperial throne; the combined military and religious strength would use their influence to contain and put down any competing claims. The second involved interning all of the emperor's possible rivals in a secure location, which drastically limited their ability to disrupt the empire with revolts or to dispute the succession of an heir apparent. Ethiopian traditions do not all agree as to exactly when the custom started of imprisoning rivals to the throne on a "Mountain of the Princes". One tradition credits this practice to the Zagwe king Yemrehana Krestos (fl. 11th century), who allegedly received the idea in a dream; Taddesse Tamrat discredits this tradition, arguing that the records of the Zagwe dynasty betray too many disputed successions for this to have been the case. Another tradition, recorded by historian Thomas Pakenham, states that this practice predates the Zagwe dynasty (which ruled from c. AD 900), and was first practiced on Debre Damo, which was captured by the 10th-century queen Yodit or "Gudit", who then isolated 200 princes there to death; however, Pakenham also notes that when questioned, the abbot of the monastery on Debre Damo knew of no such tale. Taddesse Tamrat argues that this practice began in the reign of Wedem Arad (1299–1314), following the struggle for succession that he believes lies behind the series of brief reigns of the sons of Yagbe'u Seyon (reigned 1285–1294). A constructivist approach states that the tradition was used on occasion, weakened or lapsed sometimes, and was sometimes revived to full effect after some unfortunate disputes – and that the custom started in time immemorial as Ethiopian common inheritance patterns allowed all agnates to also succeed to the lands of the monarchy – which however is contrary to keeping the country undivided.

The potential royal rivals were incarcerated at Amba Geshen until the site was destroyed in 1540 during the Ethiopian-Adal war; then, from the reign of Fasilides (1632–1667) until the mid-18th century, at Wehni. Rumors of these royal mountain residences were part of the inspiration for Samuel Johnson's short story, Rasselas.

Although the emperor of Ethiopia had theoretically unlimited power over his subjects, his councillors came to play an increasing role in governing Ethiopia, because many emperors were succeeded either by a child, or one of the incarcerated princes, who could only successfully leave their prisons with help from the outside. As a result, by the mid-18th century the power of the emperor had been largely transferred to his deputies, like Ras Mikael Sehul of Tigray (c. 1691 – 1779), who held actual power in the empire and elevated or deposed emperors at will.

== Ideology ==
The emperors of Ethiopia derived their right to rule based on two dynastic claims: their descent from the kings of Axum, and their descent from Menelik I, the legendary son of Solomon and Makeda, Queen of Sheba.

The claim to their relationship to the Kings of Axum derives from Yakuno Amlak's claim that he was the descendant of Dil Na'od, through his father, although he defeated and killed the last Zagwe king in battle. His claim to the throne was also helped by his marriage to that king's daughter, even though Ethiopians commonly do not acknowledge claims from the distaff side. The claim of descent from Menelik I is based on the assertion that the kings of Axum were also the descendants of Menelik I; its definitive and best-known formulation is set forth in the Kebra Nagast.

However, there is no historical evidence supporting the legends or Yekuno Amlak's ancestry. There is no credible basis to the claims that the Aksumite royal house was descended from Solomon (or that any Aksumite king even claimed such an ancestry) or that Yekuno Amlak was descended from the Aksumite royal house. Solomon is dated to the 10th century BCE, hundreds of years before the founding of Aksum. Historian Harold G. Marcus describes the stories of the Kebra Nagast as a "pastiche of legends" created to legitimize Yekuno Amlak's seizure of power. David Northrup notes that

the Kebra Nagast's imaginative and emotive account of a line of descent from Solomon and Sheba to the kings of Aksum and the new Solomonic dynasty is highly improbable and unsupported by evidence. It is a myth.

Although the story originated as a medieval political myth, it nevertheless became embedded in the Ethiopian sense of nationhood. This and the dynasty's continued propagation of the myth was reflected in the 1955 Ethiopian constitution, which declared that the emperor "descends without interruption from the dynasty of Menelik I, son of Queen of Ethiopia, the Queen of Sheba and King Solomon of Jerusalem".

== History ==
The Solomonic dynasty, which claimed descent from the old Aksumite rulers, ruled Ethiopia from the 13th century until 1974.

=== Modern era ===
The Amhara warrior turned emperor, Kassa of Qwara, Gonder, in 1855 took complete control over Ethiopia and was crowned Emperor Tewodros II. Of the valley nobility, he claimed paternal descent from Emperor Fasilides, by way of one of the aforementioned emperor's daughters. After Emperor Tewodros' reign, one of the many rebels leaders that helped the British in their expedition into Abyssinia was Dejazmatch Kassa, he was rewarded with articles of war for his services and went on to assume power through his claim of Solomonic descent from his mothers Gondarian ancestry and was crowned Emperor Yohannes IV. Sahle Maryam of Shewa, who descended from Solomonic emperors directly paternally through the Shewan Branch (junior only to the Gondar line), ascended the imperial throne following Emperor Yohannes IV's death and thus, purporting to restore the male-line Solomonic tradition, for which he adopted the throne name of Menelik II.

The Emperor Tewodros spent his youth fighting with invading Ottoman Egyptians (termed 'Turks' by the Ethiopians), then unifying the empire after the dark age of the 'Zemene Mesafint' (Era of the Princes). Emperor Yohannes IV defeated an invading Egyptian army in modern day Eritrea and died while working to address the situation regarding the Mahdist presence in Ethiopia. Emperor Menelik II achieved a major military victory against Italian invaders in March 1896 at the Battle of Adwa and conquered the modern borders of Ethiopia.

=== Italian occupation of Ethiopia ===
Italy under Benito Mussolini attacked Ethiopia in 1935, starting the Second Italo-Ethiopian War. Italian successes in the war caused the emperor Haile Selassie to be voted into exile by his nobles in 1936; he pled Ethiopia's case against Italy before the League of Nations, but aid from the League was not forthcoming. Italy added Ethiopia to its already existing colonies of Eritrea and Italian Somalia, creating the new dependent state of Italian East Africa and was the first to associate Ethiopia as part of the Horn of Africa.

On 9 May 1936, King Victor Emmanuel III of Italy proclaimed himself emperor of Ethiopia, replacing Haile Selassie. He was recognised as emperor in the following year by all the countries in the world (with the exception of the USSR).

Victor Emmanuel's claim to emperorship was not entirely accepted, with the Soviet Union never considering the Italian conquest legitimate, and Haile Selassie continuing to contest the occupation from exile in the United Kingdom. With Italy's entry on the side of the Axis powers in World War II, the African part of the British Empire aided Haile Selassie and anti-Italian Ethiopian forces in the East African campaign. Italy was defeated and Selassie restored to the throne, with most combat in Ethiopia ending in 1941. The Armistice of Cassibile was signed in September 1943 with the Kingdom of Italy's surrender, and Victor Emmanuel III officially renounced his title as emperor of Ethiopia in November 1943.

=== Return of Haile Selassie, post-war period, and end of the monarchy ===
In January 1942, Haile Selassie was officially reinstated to power in Ethiopia. The position of the emperor and the line of succession were strictly defined in both of the constitutions adopted during the reign of Selassie: the one adopted on July 16, 1931; and the revised one of November 1955.

Haile Selassie was the last Solomonic monarch to rule Ethiopia. He was deposed by the Derg, the committee of lower-ranking military and police officials on September 12, 1974. The Derg offered the throne to Selassie's son Amha Selassie, who – understandably mistrustful of the Derg – refused to return to Ethiopia to rule. The Derg abolished the monarchy on 21 March 1975. In April 1989, Amha Selassie was proclaimed emperor in exile at London, with his succession backdated to the date of Haile Selassie's death in August 1975 rather than his deposition in September 1974. In 1993 a group called the "Crown Council of Ethiopia", which included several descendants of Haile Selassie, affirmed Amha as emperor and legal head of Ethiopia. However, the 1995 Constitution of Ethiopia confirmed the abolition of the monarchy.

== Symbols ==
The conquering Lion of Judah, a title of the Ethiopian emperor and a national symbol of Ethiopia.

Coat of arms of the Emperor of Ethiopia

Imperial Standard of Haile Selassie (obverse)

Imperial Standard of Haile Selassie (reverse)

== Family tree ==
Family of Emperor of Ethiopia
(Note: This family tree only includes the historical figures' paternal ancestries)
style="border-spacing: 2px; border: 1px solid darkgray;"

Legend
EMPEROR (bold, capital letters)

Marriage

Descent

Uncertain/purported/legendary descent

HOUSE OF DAVID
SOLOMON; King of Israel | MAKEDA; Queen of Sheba
MENELIK I Legendary first emperor
KINGS OF AXUM (mostly legendary genealogy)
DIL NA'OD; Last King of Axum
MARA TAKLA; HAYMANOT (1) | Masoba Warq | Mkhbara Widam (Mahbere-Widam)
ZAGWE DYNASTY
TATADIM (2) | JAN SEYUM (3) | GERMA SEYUM (4) | Agba Seyun (Yakob)
KEDUS HARBE (6) | GEBRE MESQEL; LALIBELA (7) | YEMREHANA; KRESTOS (5) | Sinfa Ar'ad
NA'AKUETO LA'AB (8) | YETBARAK (9) | Negus Zaré
Asfiha
Yakob
Bahr Seggad
Zagwe dynasty | Adam Asgad (Widma Asgad)
Tasfa Iyasus
YEKUNO AMLAK; 1270–1285
SOLOMONIC; DYNASTY
Yagbe'u Seyon (SALOMON I); 1285–1294 | WEDEM ARAD; 1299–1314 | Prince; Qidma Seggada
SENFA ARED IV; 1294–1295 | HEZBA ASGAD; 1295–1296 | QEDMA ASGAD; 1296–1297 | JIN ASGAD; 1297–1298 | SABA ASGAD; 1298–1299 | AMDA SEYON I 1314–1344
NEWAYA KRESTOS; 1344–1372
DAWIT I 1382–1413 | NEWAYA MARYAM; 1372–1382
TEWODROS I 1413–1414 | YESHAQ I 1414–1429 | TAKLA MARYAM; 1430–1433 | ZARA YAQOB; 1434–1468
ANDREYAS; 1429–1430 | SARWE IYASUS; 1433 | AMDA IYASUS; 1433–1434 | BAEDA MARYAM I 1468–1478
ESKENDER; 1478–1494 | NA'OD; 1494–1507
AMDA SEYON II; 1494 | DAWIT II; 1507–1540
GELAWDEWOS; 1540–1559 | MENAS; 1559–1563 | Prince Yakob
SOLOMONIC; DYNASTY; GONDAR BRANCH | SOLOMONIC; DYNASTY; SHEWA BRANCH
SARSA DENGEL; 1563–1597 | Prince; Lesana Krestos | Prince Fasilidas | Prince; Segwa Qal
YAQOB; 1597–1603; 1604–1606 | ZA DENGEL; 1603–1604 | SUSENYOS I 1606–1632 | Warada Qal
FASILIDES; 1632–1667 | Lebsa Qal
YOHANNES I 1667–1682 | Negasi Krestos; Ruler of Shewa
Princess Amlakawit | IYASU I 1682–1706 | TEWOFLOS; 1708–1711 | Sebestyanos; Ruler of Shewa
Delba Iyasus; Dejazmatch of Tigray | TEKLE HAYMANOT I 1706–1708 | BAKAFFA; 1721–1730 | DAWIT III; 1716–1721 | YOHANNES II; 1769 | Qedami Qal; Ruler of Shewa
YOSTOS; 1711–1716 | IYASU II; 1730–1755 | TEKLE; HAYMANOT II; 1769–1770; 1770–1777 | TEKLE GIYORGIS I 1779–1784; 1788–1789; 1794–1795; 1795–1796; 1798–1799; 1800 | Amha Iyasus; Ruler of Shewa
Prince Adigo | Prince Atsequ | IYOAS I 1755–1769 | HEZQEYAS; 1789–1794 | SALOMON III; 1796–1797; 1799 | YOHANNES III; 1840–1841; 1845; 1850–1851 | Asfa Wossen; Ruler of Shewa
SALOMON II; 1777–1779 | IYASU III; 1784–1788 | EGWALE SEYON; 1801–1818 | IYOAS II; 1818–1821 | IYASU IV; 1830–1832 | Unascertainable claims of descent from Fasilides (intermediate generations omitted) | Wossen Seged; Ruler of Shewa
(alleged sons of Iyasu II)
BAEDA MARYAM II; 1795 | SUSENYOS II; 1770 | GIGAR; 1821–1826; 1826–1830 | YONAS; 1797–1798 | Gabre Masai | DEMETROS; 1799–1800; 1800–1801
GEBRE KRESTOS; 1832 | SAHLE DENGEL; 1832–1840; 1841–1845; 1845–1850; 1851–1855 | Sahle Selassie; Ruler of Shewa
BAEDA MARYAM III (1826) (unknown parentage) | YOHANNES; DYNASTY | TEWODROS; DYNASTY
Mirtcha Wolde Kidane; Shum of Tembien | TEWODROS II; 1855–1868 | Haile Melekot; Ruler of Shewa | Princess; Tenagnework
ZAGWE DYNASTY (RESTORED)
TEKLE GIYORGIS II; 1868–1872 | Empress Dinqinesh | YOHANNES IV; 1872–1889 | Woizero Altash | MENELIK II; 1889–1913 | Other wives | Ras Makonnen; Governor of Harar
Araya Selassie; King of Tigray | ZEWDITU; 1916–1930 | Princess; Shoagarad | HAILE SELASSIE; 1930–1974
LIJ IYASU; 1913–1916 designated but uncrowned Emperor of Ethiopia | AMHA SELASSIE; 1989–1997; Crown Prince; Titular Emperor
ZERA YACOB; 1997–present Crown Prince; Titular Emperor

== See also ==
- Kebra Nagast
- Fetha Negest
- History of Ethiopia
- Monarchies of Ethiopia
- List of emperors of Ethiopia
