= Yeshaq I =

Emperor of Ethiopia from 1414 to 1429

Yesehaq I ቀዳማዊ ዐፄ ይሥሐቅ

Emperor of Ethiopia
- Reign: 23 June 1414 – 1429
- Predecessor: Tewodros I
- Successor: Andreyas
- Dynasty: House of Solomon
- Father: Dawit I
- Religion: Ethiopian Orthodox

Yeshaq I (Ge'ez: ይሥሐቅ), throne name: Gabra Masqal II (Ge'ez: ገብረ መስቀል) was Emperor of Ethiopia from 1414 to 1429/1430, and a member of the Solomonic dynasty. He was the second son of Emperor Dawit I.

== Ancestry ==
Of Amhara lineage. Yeshaq I was a son of Emperor Dawit I, probably by Seyon Mogasa, one of Dawit's wives.

Yeshaq had several notable brothers among them Emperor Tewodros I who he succeeded in 1414. His younger brothers included Emperor Takla Maryam and Emperor Zara Yaqob.

== Sources ==
Much of the details of Yeshaq's reign is found in the works of the medieval Arab historian Al-Maqrizi as well as in scattered Geʽez sources, and in an early Amharic poetic text. The overall image of Yeshaq which emerges from the sources is one of a powerful and confrontational Christian leader who fought his enemies, both political and religious, on several fronts.

== Reign ==
Yeshaq's reign was marked by a revolt of the Beta Israel. In response, the Emperor marched into Wegera, where he defeated the rebels at Kossoge some 30 kilometres (19 mi) north of Gondar, thereby ending the revolt. He also had the church Debre Yeshaq built there to commemorate his victory. Yeshaq also invaded the Shanqella region beyond Agawmeder, and to the southeast he fought against Mansur ad-Din and Jamal ad-Din II.

Yeshaq, according to the Islamic historian al-Maqrizi, hired a group of Mamluks led by al-Tabingha to train his army in gunnery and swordfighting, they also taught him the secrets of Greek fire. This is the earliest reference to firearms (Arabic naft) in Ethiopia. About the same time another Egyptian visitor, a Copt, "reorganized the kingdom," according to al-Maqrizi, "and collected so much wealth for the Hati [the Emperor] that he enjoyed the king's authority." This unnamed Copt also introduced the practice of the Emperor dressing in "splendid" clothes and carrying a cross, which made him stand out from his subjects.

Further, George Wynn Brereton Huntingford suggests that it was during Yeshaq's reign that the rulers of Ethiopia ceased having permanent capitals; instead, their courts were held in their encampments as they progressed around their realm.

Yeshaq made the earliest known contact from post-Axumite Ethiopia to a European ruler. He sent a letter by two dignitaries to Alfonso V of Aragon, which reached the king in 1428, proposing an alliance against the Muslims and would be sealed by a dual marriage, that would require Infante Peter to bring a group of artisans to Ethiopia, where he would marry Yeshaq's daughter. It is not clear how or if Alfonso responded to this letter, although in a letter that reached Yeshaq's successor Zara Yaqob in 1450, Alfonso wrote that he would be happy to send artisans to Ethiopia if their safe arrival could be guaranteed, for on a previous occasion a party of thirteen of his subjects traveling to Ethiopia had all perished.

A notable example of Ethiopian literature that has survived from this period is a panegyric addressed to Yeshaq, which Enrico Cerulli singled out as a gem of Ethiopian poetry. The first mention of the Yem people is found (under the now pejorative exonym "Jangero") in the victory song of Yishaq I, with them stated as paying tribute in the form of horses to the king. The first mention of the ethnonym "Somali" dates to the reign of Emperor Yishaq who had one of his court officials compose a hymn celebrating a military victory over the Sultan of Ifat's and his eponymous troops. Along with this, the Shanqella first appear where they're listed at the very beginning when the regions and tribes of the kingdom are evoked.

E. A. Wallis Budge states that he was assassinated, and "buried in Tadbaba Maryam", a convent in Sayint, while Ethiopian historian Tadesse Tamrat believes that the primary sources mask Yeshaq's death in battle against the Muslim Adalites under the Adal Sultan Jamal ad-Din II.

Sultan of Adal Jamal ad-Din II later undertook a further expedition in which it is recorded that he killed or took prisoners of everyone within twenty-days journey of his frontier. The Emperor's forces countered by attacking three different parts of Adal and threatening its capital where the royal family resided. Jamal ad-Din rushed home covering the distance of what was twenty days of journey in only three days. He met the imperial army at Harjah, where Yeshaq's army, though exhausted, fought well but was eventually defeated. The Emperor Yeshaq according to Maqrizi was killed in this battle. His death like that of Dawit, and perhaps for the same reason, is not recorded for the same reason that the royal Ethiopian chronicles suppressed the violent deaths of their kings whose reigns they extolled.

The principal antagonist of the Sirat Sayf ibn Dhi-Yazan, a 15th century Arabic epic set during the Axumite conquest of Yemen, is named Sayf Ar'ed (Sword of terror). Likely inspired by the Negus due to his wars with neighboring Muslims, this reference to the emperor played a crucial role in dating the medieval work. How the protagonist is built up as a hero propagating Islam was doubtlessly encouraged by the event that triggered the writing of the Sīrat, which was according to Jean-Claude Garcin the capture of Zeila in modern-day Somalia by Yeshaq I in 1415 and the jihād that followed it until 1445 without the Muslims getting the upper hand over the Ethiopian power. As a criticism of contemporary Mamluk politics the sīrat could provide comfort to the Egyptians despite their lack of victories. The hero of the plot has the mission to redirect the waters of the Nile, held by the Ethiopians, back towards Egypt. This was doubtlessly inspired to the same threats made by contemporary emperors to the Egyptians.

Regnal titles
Preceded by Tewodros I	Emperor of Ethiopia; 1414–1429	Succeeded by Andreyas
