= Salomon of Ethiopia =

Salomon or Solomon of Ethiopia may refer to:

- Salomon I of Ethiopia, also called Yagbe'u Seyon (r. 1285–1294)
- Salomon II of Ethiopia (r. 1777–1779)
- Salomon III of Ethiopia (r. 1796–1797)
