= Wedem Arad =

Emperor of Ethiopia from 1299 to 1314

Wedem Arad ዐፄ ወደም አራድ

Emperor of Ethiopia
- Reign: 1299–1314
- Predecessor: Saba Asgad
- Successor: Amda Seyon I
- Died: 1314
- Dynasty: House of Solomon
- Religion: Ethiopian Orthodox

Wedem Arad (Ge'ez: ወደም አራድ; died 1314) was Emperor of Ethiopia from 1299 to 1314 and a member of the Solomonic dynasty. He was the brother of Yagbe'u Seyon, and seized power from his nephews.

== Reign ==
Only one military action is recorded for this ruler. In the first year of his reign, one Sheikh Abu-Abdallah had gathered a large following and proclaimed a jihad against Wedem Arad's realm. Wedem Arad sent a number of agents into Abu-Abdallah's camp, who were able to persuade most of his followers to defect. Without sufficient manpower, Abu-Abdallah was forced to agree to a treaty with Wedem Arad, in return for providing "them with all their needs until they are completely satisfied". Taddesse Tamrat suggests this involved giving them land to settle on, and notes that on the edge of the territory of Shewa there is a locality known as "Abdalla", which might be that settlement.

In 1306, Wedem Arad sent an embassy of 30 envoys to Europe seeking the "king of the Spaniards" (probably Castile and Aragon). Perhaps hearing of the Christians' successes against Al-Andalus in Iberia, Wedem Arad sought to negotiate a mutual defense pact with them against their common Muslim enemies. Whether or not the envoys reached their destination is unknown, but they did visit Rome and got as far as Avignon. Delayed on their way home, they spent some time in Genoa, where they were interviewed by the geographer Giovanni da Carignano. Giovanni's account of their country based on the interviews is lost, but was summarized by Jacobus Philippus Foresti da Bergamo in his Supplementum Chronicarum; this is the first text that associates the legendary figure of Prester John with Ethiopia.

G.W.B. Huntingford speculates that the settlement of Tegulet first became the capital of Ethiopia during Wedem Arad's reign.

Regnal titles
| Preceded by Saba Asgad | Emperor of Ethiopia; 1299–1314 | Succeeded by Amda Seyon I |
