= Emperor Theodore =

Emperor Theodore (or Fedor, Theodoros, et cetera) may refer to:

- Feodor I of Russia, son of Ivan the Terrible
- Feodor II of Russia, son of Boris Godunov
- Feodor III of Russia, older brother of Peter the Great
- Theodore I Laskaris, a Byzantine emperor
- Theodore II Laskaris, a Byzantine emperor
- Tewodros I of Ethiopia
- Tewodros II of Ethiopia
