= Andreyas =

Emperor of Ethiopia from 1429 to 1430

Andreyas ዐፄ አንድሬያስ

Emperor of Ethiopia
- Reign: September 1429 – March 1430
- Predecessor: Yeshaq I
- Successor: Takla Maryam
- Died: March 1430
- House: House of Solomon
- Father: Yeshaq I
- Religion: Ethiopian Orthodox Church

Andreyas (Ge'ez: አንድሬያስ) was Emperor of Ethiopia from 1429 to 1430, and a member of the Solomonic dynasty. He was a son of Yeshaq I, succeeded his father when he was very young. According to Al-Maqrizi, his reign lasted only four months, whereas the short chronicles states he reigned for a period of six months. His uncle Takla Maryam reigned after him.

The British explorer James Bruce, who wrote one of the earliest European histories of Abyssinia, reports little more than Andreyas was buried with his father at the Tadbaba Maryam monastery.

Regnal titles
Preceded by Yeshaq I	Emperor of Ethiopia; 1429–1430	Succeeded by Takla Maryam
