= Haqq ad-Din II =

Haqq ad-Din II حق الدين الثاني
- Sultan of Ifat
- Reign: late 14th century
- Predecessor: Ahmed Harb 'Arad
- Successor: Sa'ad ad-Din II
Names
- Haqq ad-Din II
- Dynasty: Walashma dynasty
- Religion: Islam

Haqq ad-Din II (Arabic: حق الدين الثاني) (ruled late 14th century) was a Sultan of the Ifat Sultanate, the brother of Sa'ad ad-Din II, and the son of Ahmad ibn Ali.

He was the first Sultan to move the capital of Ifat to the Harar plateau (Adal) hence Taddesse Tamrat credits him as "the founder of the kingdom of Adal as we know it in its protracted struggle with the Christian kingdom [of Abyssinia]"

== Reign ==
Although Al-Maqrizi states that both Haqq ad-Din and his brother Sa'ad ad-Din II were born at the Ethiopian court, both grew up to be the strongest champions of Islam in the Ethiopian region. According to Tamrat Taddesse, due to the antipathy the rest of the Walashmas had to his father Ahmad for his collaboration over the Ethiopians, Haqq started his career as an outlaw at odds with both his grandfather Ali ibn Sabr ad-Din and his uncle Mola Asfah. Taddesse Tamrat credits him with a great deal of Islamic learning, and in time became the leader of the militant Islamic group in the region.

Once surrounded by numerous followers, he declared war on his two male relatives. They turned to the Ethiopian Emperor Newaya Krestos for help, but in a series of engagements he defeated their combined army, and his uncle Mola Asfah was killed in battle. The Ethiopian Emperor triumphantly entered the city of Ifat, where he magnanimously confirmed his grandfather as titular ruler of the city; although he founded a new capital at Wahal. (Trimingham calls this new city Wafat.) Taddesse Tamrat notes that while this new location helped preserve Ifat's autonomy under Ethiopia, it had a cost in that it gave up all of the dynastic political influence over Shewa and the neighboring Muslim kingdoms of Dawaro, Hadiya and Bale.

== Death ==
Haqq ad-Din ruled for ten years, until he was killed in action against soldiers of the Ethiopian Emperor. The date of his death is disputed: in the account of Al-Maqrizi, Haqq ad-Din was killed in AH 776 (= AD 1373/1374); however, the chronicle of the Walashma dynasty states he died in AD 1386. The matter is not helped by the fact Al-Maqrizi says the Emperor who ruled at the time of Haqq ad-Din's death was Dawit I, while Ethiopian sources state that the Sultan's reign began in the reign of Emperor Newaya Krestos. Taddesse Tamrat argues that Al-Maqrizi was right about Haqq's year of death, but confused Emperor Newaya Maryam with his more famous successor Dawit I; Richard Pankhurst, on the other hand, accepts the chronicle's date and al-Makrizi's identification of Dawit I.

== See also ==
- Walashma dynasty
- Haqq ad-Din I
- Gadabuursi Ughazate

== Notes ==
Preceded by Ali ibn Sabr ad-Din	Walashma dynasty	Succeeded by Sa'ad ad-Din II
