= Solomon III =

Solomon III may refer to:

- Solomon III (bishop of Constance) (r. 890–919)
- Salomon III of Ethiopia (r. 1796–1797)
