= Sons of Yagbe'u Seyon =

Five consecutive Emperors of Ethiopia from 1294 to 1299

Emperors of Ethiopia
- Reign: 1294–1299
- Predecessor: Yagbe'u Seyon
- Successor: Wedem Arad
- Dynasty: House of Solomon
- Father: Yagbe'u Seyon
- Religion: Ethiopian Orthodox Tewahedo

Five men known as sons of Yagbe'u Seyon ruled as Emperor of Ethiopia in succession between 1294 and 1299. Their names were:

- Seyfa Ared (Amharic: ሰይፈ አርድ ፬ኛ) (1294–1295) (Throne name – Bahr Asgad)
- Hezba Asgad (Amharic: ሕዝበ አስግድ) (1295–1296)
- Qedma Asgad (Amharic: ቅድመ አስግድ) (1296–1297)
- Jin Asgad (Amharic: ጅን አስግድ) (1297–1298)
- Saba Asgad (Amharic: ሳባ አስግድ) (1298–1299)

Though later tradition remembered them as sons of Yagbe'u Seyon, their actual relationship is not clear, though they did succeed him.

== Reigns ==
Yagbe'u Seyon's five successors ruled Ethiopia between his reign and that of Wedem Arad. Although all of the primary sources agree that Yagbe'u Seyon and Wedem Arad were sons of Yekuno Amlak, sources disagree about how the five Emperors who reigned between them are related. There are multiple different interpretations:

- Both James Bruce and the traditions collected by Antoine d'Abbadie state that these were the sons of Yekuno Amlak.
- The oldest surviving list of Ethiopian kings lists four of these five (omitting Saba Asgad) without any mention of their filial relationship.
- A regnal list quoted by Pedro Páez did not name these five monarchs directly, but simply stated that Yagbe'u Seyon was followed by two sons who reigned for three years in total, followed by three grandsons of Yagbe'u Seyon who reigned for two years in total.
- The Gadla of Saint Basalota Mika’el states that Qedma Asgad was the son of Yekuno Amlak.

Historians disagree over the situation that his successors experienced. Paul B. Henze states that Yagbe'u Seyon could not decide which of his sons should inherit his kingdom, and instructed that each would rule in turn for a year. Taddesse Tamrat, on the other hand, records that his reign was followed by dynastic confusion, during which each of his sons held the throne. E.A. Wallis Budge adds the tradition that Jin Asgad initiated the use of Amba Geshen as a royal prison for troublesome relatives of the Emperor, when he was forced to imprison his treacherous brother Saba Asgad; at the same time he imprisoned his other three brothers and his own sons in Amba Geshen.

Whatever the succession situation truly was, it came to an end when Wedem Arad seized the throne.

Preceded by Yagbe'u Seyon	Emperor of Ethiopia	Succeeded by Wedem Arad
