= Ahmad ibn Ali =

Ahmad ibn Ali أحمد بن علي
- Governor of Ifat
- Reign: mid-14th century
- Successor: Haqq ad-Din II
- Dynasty: Walashma dynasty
- Religion: Islam

Ahmad Harb 'Arad (Arabic: أحمد بن علي) (flourished mid-14th century) was the son of Jamal ad-Din I. The Emperor of Ethiopia Newaya Krestos made him Governor of Ifat after his father Ali ibn Sabr ad-Din unsuccessfully revolted against the Emperor and was put into prison.

== Reign ==
Ahmad accepted his role as a vassal to Emperor Newaya Krestos and hence regarded very poorly by the Walashma family. His father Ali was released from imprisonment after eight years and restored to the governorship, whereupon he treated Ahmad as a traitor, excluding him from all positions of authority. Ahmad called on the intervention of Emperor Newaya Krestos to gain a position over a single district; and his sons were considered outcasts by the rest of the Walashma family

== See also ==
- Walashma dynasty

== Notes ==
Preceded by Jamal ad-Din I	Walashma dynasty	Succeeded by Haqq ad-Din II
