= Ali ibn Sabr ad-Din =

Ali ibn Sabr ad-Din علي بن صابر الدين زنكي
- Governor of Ifat
- Reign: after 1344
- Successor: Ahmad ibn Ali
Names
- Ali ibn Sabr ad-Din
- Religion: Islam

Ali ibn Sabr ad-Din (Arabic: علي بن صابر الدين زنكي) (fl. after 1344) was the son of Sabr ad-Din I. The Emperor of Ethiopia Newaya Krestos made him Governor of Ifat after the death of his father.

== Reign ==
According to Taddesse Tamrat, Al-Maqrizi describes Ali as "the first to revolt from the customary allegiance to the Hati [Emperor]", a claim that Taddesse Tamrat explains as meaning that Ali was the first of his family to revolt since the death of Emperor Amda Seyon I.

His revolt was unsuccessful due to lack of support from his subjects. Ali was captured, and he and all of his sons except for Ahmad imprisoned. Emperor Newaya Krestos subsequently made Ahmad governor of Ifat. However, after eight years Ali was released from prison and returned to power. Ahmad and his sons were excluded from power, and it took the direct intervention of the Emperor for Ahmad to obtain a position over a single district.

In the end, his grandson Haqq ad-Din II led a rebellion that ended Ali's power, although Haqq allowed his grandfather to retain the title of ruler over the city of Ifat. Richard Pankhurst mentions that Ali had a son, Mola Asfah, who fought against his cousin Haqq ad-Din, and was killed in this rebellion.

There is some disagreement over the exact length of Ali's reign. Al-Maqrizi in one place in his Historica Regum Islamiticorum in Abyssinia states that Ali was released after eight years of imprisonment, but in another place writes that he was in prison for a total of 30 years and died during the reign of his grandson Sa'ad ad-Din II. To further complicate the evidence, the chronicle of the Walashma dynasty gives him a reign of 40 years, and his son Ahmad a reign of only two.

== See also ==
- Walashma dynasty

== Notes ==
Preceded by Jamal ad-Din I	Walashma dynasty	Succeeded by Ahmad ibn Ali
