= Amda Iyasus =

Emperor of Ethiopia from 1433 to 1434

Amda Iyasus ዐፄ ዐምደ ኢየሱስ
- Negusa nagast

Emperor of Ethiopia
- Reign: November 1433 – June 1434
- Predecessor: Sarwe Iyasus
- Successor: Zara Yaqob
- Dynasty: Solomonic dynasty
- Father: Takla Maryam
- Religion: Ethiopian Orthodox

Amda Iyasus (Ge'ez: ዐምደ ኢየሱስ; died June 1434) was Emperor of Ethiopia for one year, from 1433 to 1434. His throne name Badel Nan (Ge’ez: በድል ናኝ) and a member of the Solomonic dynasty. He was the younger son of Takla Maryam.

E. A. Wallis Budge notes that Amda Iyasus ruled for eight months, and left no children. The royal chronicles also do not relay his deeds during his brief tenure atop the throne. Al-Maqrizi was reportedly puzzled by the quick turnover in Kings.

Regnal titles
| Preceded by Sarwe Iyasus | Emperor of Ethiopia; 1433–1434 | Succeeded by Zara Yaqob |
