= Giacomo Filippo Foresti =

Italian monk, chronicler and Biblical scholar (1434–1520)

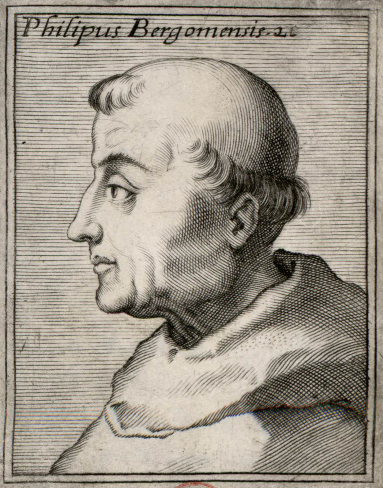
Giacomo Filippo Foresti, called Philippe de Bergamo

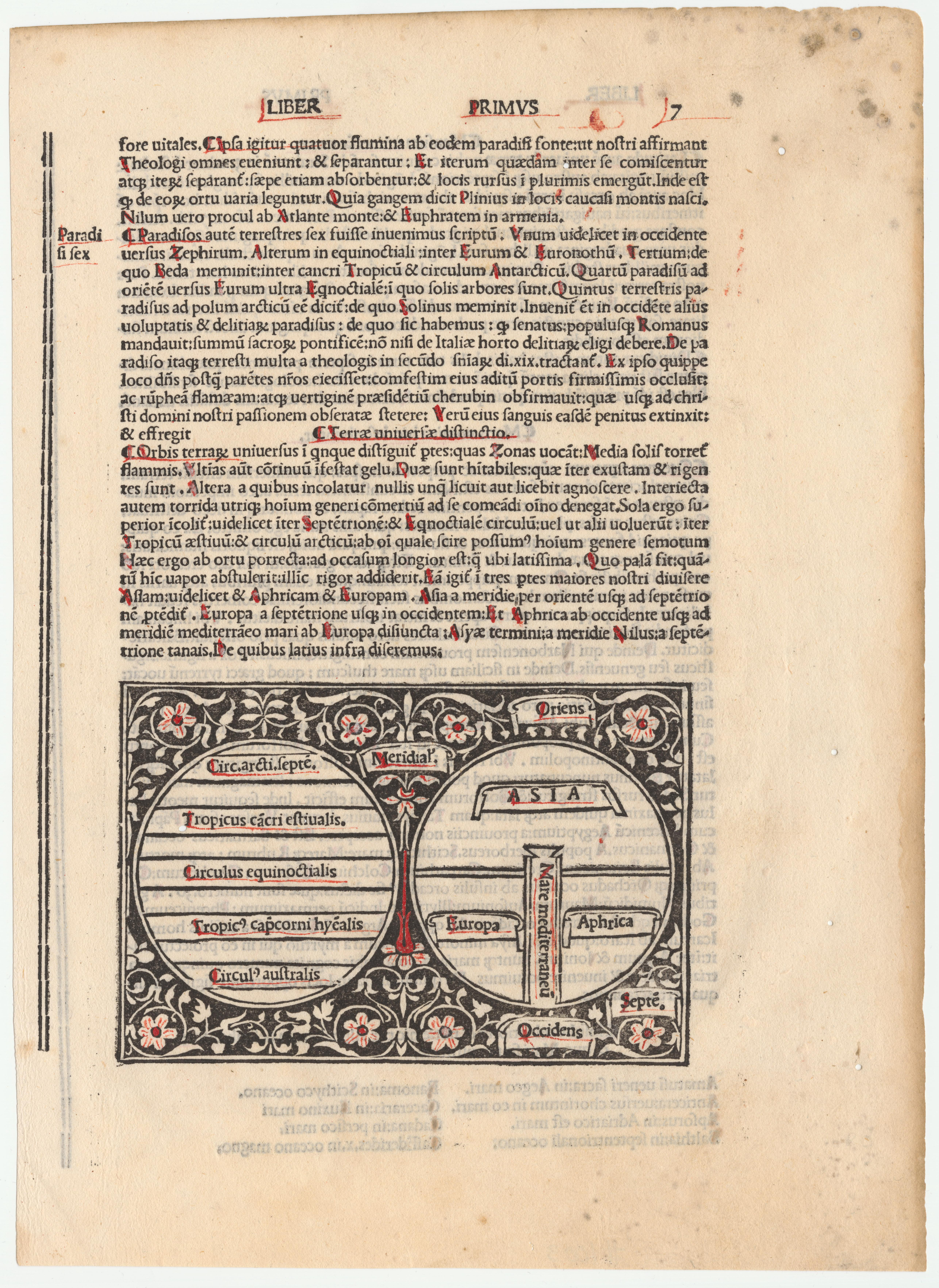
A T-O World Map by Jacobus, P. (1503). Novissime hystoriarum omnium repercussiones. Venetiis: Albertinus di Lissona.

Giacomo Filippo Foresti da Bergamo (1434–1520) was an Augustinian friar, known as the author of several significant early printed works. He was a chronicler and Biblical scholar.

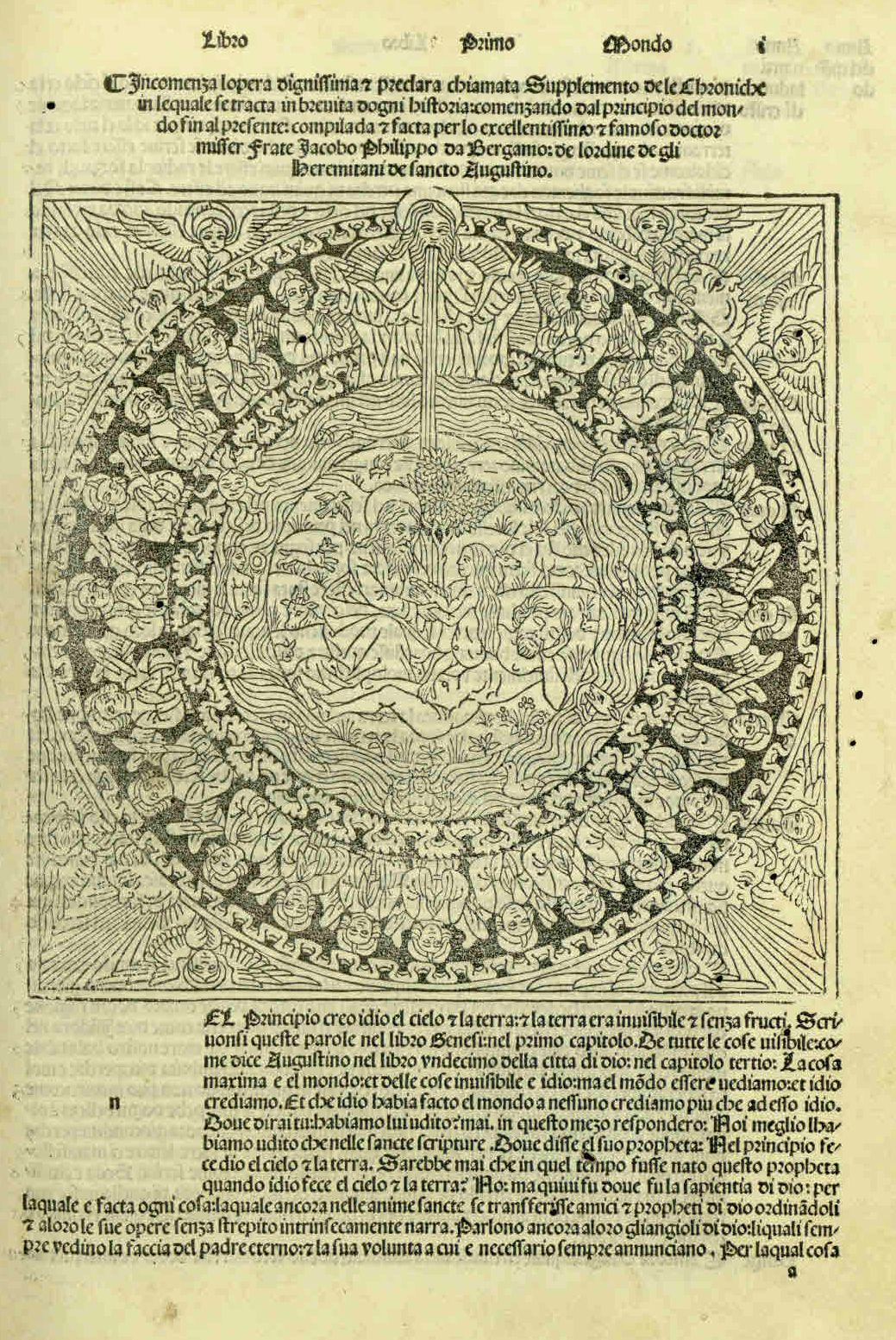
Supplementum chronicarum, 1491

== Biography ==
Giacomo Filippo Foresti was born in 1434 in Solto Collina, near Bergamo, into a noble family. After completing his studies, he entered the Order of the Hermits of Saint Augustine in 1451, receiving the religious habit from Giovanni Nibbia of Novara, one of the founders of the order's Lombard congregation. From then on, Foresti divided his time between his religious duties and the study of historical sources concerning the Middle Ages. He compiled extensive collections of historical material, which later served as an important basis for his own writings. He aimed to bring together the accounts of different historians, reconcile their narratives, and thereby produce a comprehensive universal history.

His Supplementum chronicarum (first printed at Venice, 1483) was a supplement to the usual universal chronicle; it ran to numerous subsequent editions. Though it mixes mythological figures, treated euhemeristically as historical ones, on an equal footing with Christian cultural heroes, with additional chapters on the Sibyls and the Trojan War, amongst other things, it was thought to contain Giovanni da Carignano's lost work on papal contacts at Avignon in 1306 with Ethiopian visitors. Recent research has both drawn attention to the Legenda Aurea and the letter of Prester John as possible sources for Foresti's narration of the episode, casting doubt on the veracity of an Ethiopian embassy to Europe at this date, as well as a section in the Cronica Universalis of Galvano Fiamma, indicating conversely that this section of Foresti's account is entirely and directly based, to exclusion of other sources, on the cartographic treatise of Giovanni da Carignano.

His De claris mulieribus updated the work of Boccaccio of the same title. It was dedicated to Beatrice of Aragon. This book, as well as the Supplementum, influenced many subsequent publications.

He also wrote a well-known confessional.

== Works ==
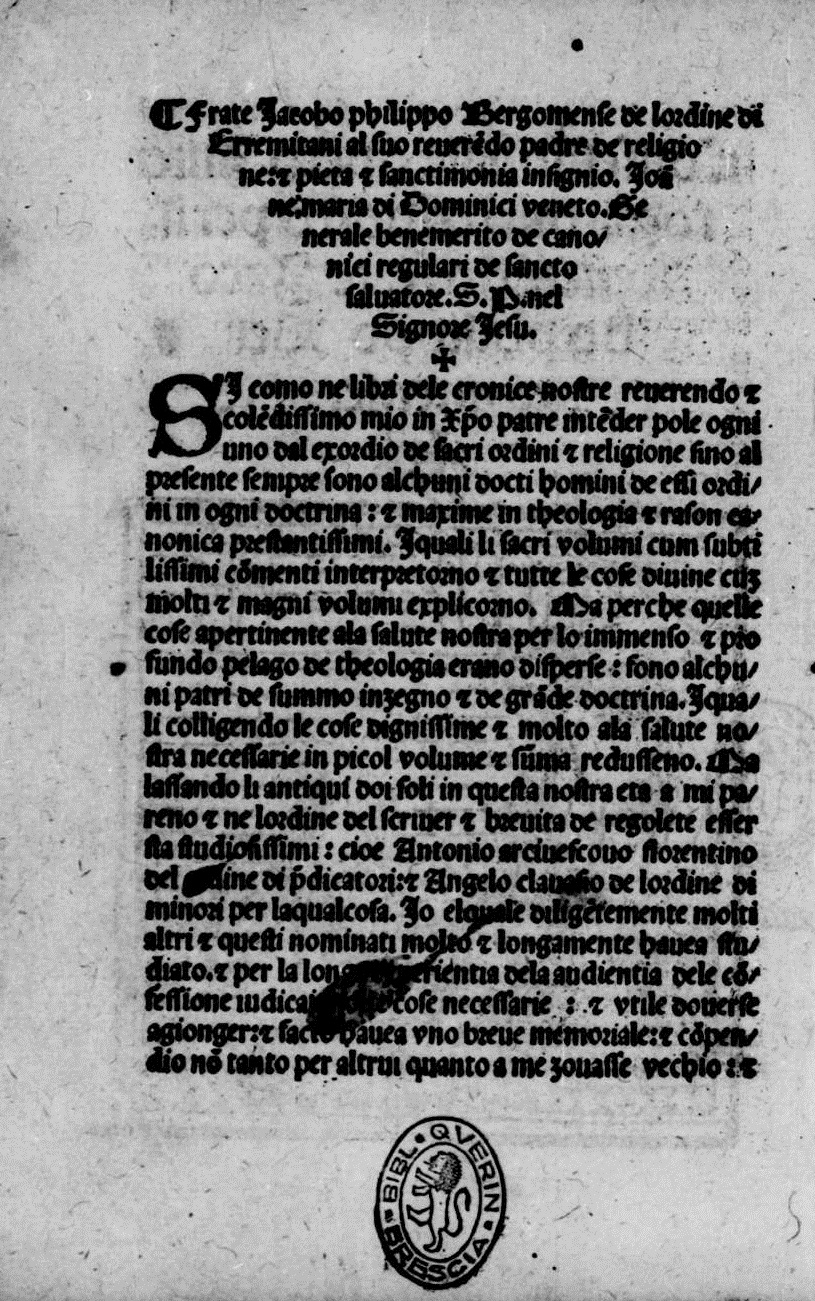
Confessionale seu interrogatorium, 1520

- Supplementum chronicarum, Bernardino Benali, Venice 1483
- De plurimis claris selectisque mulieribus, Lorenzo de Rubeis, Ferrara 1497
- Confessionale seu interrogatorium (in Italian). Venice: Alessandro Bindoni. 1520.
