= Sarwe Iyasus =

Emperor of Ethiopia in 1433

Sarwe Iyasus ዐፄ ሣርወ ኢየሱስ

Emperor of Ethiopia
- Reign: June – November 1433
- Predecessor: Takla Maryam
- Successor: Amda Iyasus
- Dynasty: House of Solomon
- Father: Takla Maryam
- Religion: Ethiopian Orthodox Church

Sarwe Iyasus (Ge'ez: ሣርወ ኢየሱስ), throne name Mehreka Nañ (Ge'ez: ምሕርከ ናኝ), was Emperor of Ethiopia in 1433, and a member of the Solomonic dynasty. He was the older son of Takla Maryam.

According to E. A. Wallis Budge, Sarwe Iyasus ruled for either four or eight months, and died of plague. According to James Bruce, some of the Ethiopian lists of rulers omit his name.

Regnal titles
Preceded by Takla Maryam	Emperor of Ethiopia; 1433	Succeeded by Amda Iyasus
