= Mehal Sayint =

Mehal Sayint መኻል ሣይንት
- Woreda
- Flag
- Country: Ethiopia
- Region: Amhara
- Zone: South Wollo

Area
  - Total: 1,437.30 km^{2} (554.94 sq mi)

Population (2012 est.)
  - Total: 156,940
  - Density: 109.19/km^{2} (282.80/sq mi)

Mehal Sayint (Amharic: መኻል ሣይንት)s one of the woredas in the Amhara Region of Ethiopia. It is named after the historic district of Sayint. Part of the Debub Wollo Zone, Mehal Sayint is bordered on the south by Debre Sina, and on the north and east by Sayint. Mehal Sayint was separated from Sayint.

== Demographics ==
A 2012 estimate puts the population at 156,940. This gives a population density of 109.19 people per square kilometer (282.80 people per square mile), given its area of 1,473.30 square kilometers (554.94 square miles), much lower than the South Wollo Zone average of 161.49 people per square kilometer (418.56 people per square mile).

Based on the 2007 national census conducted by the Central Statistical Agency of Ethiopia (CSA), this woreda has a total population of 73,432, of whom 36,369 are men and 37,063 women. The majority of the inhabitants said they practiced Ethiopian Orthodox Christianity, with 96.19% reporting that as their religion, while 3.79% of the population were Muslim.
