= Takla Maryam =

Emperor of Ethiopia from 1430 to 1433

Takla Maryam ዐፄ ተክለ ማርያም

Emperor of Ethiopia
- Reign: March 1430 – June 1433
- Predecessor: Andreyas
- Successor: Sarwe Iyasus
- Issue: Sarwe Iyasus; Amda Iyasus
- Dynasty: House of Solomon
- Father: Dawit I
- Religion: Ethiopian Orthodox Church

Takla Maryam (Ge'ez: ተክለ ማርያም), throne name Hezbe Nañ (Ge'ez: ሕዝበ ናኝ) was Emperor of Ethiopia from 1430 to 1433, and a member of the Solomonic dynasty. He was the third son of Dawit I.

Manoel de Almeida remarks that the descendants of Takla Maryam had been taken from Amba Geshen by Emperor Zara Yaqob and "exiled to hot lands where there are many diseases"; when his son Emperor Baeda Maryam I, early in his reign, attempted to redress this injury by recalling them from exile, they slew his messengers. Although Baeda Maryam I promptly took punitive measures (which included decapitating 80 of their members), in de Almeida's day they were "still rigorously watched".

== Notes ==
Regnal titles
Preceded by Andreyas	Emperor of Ethiopia; 1430–1433	Succeeded by Sarwe Iyasus
