= Solomonic dynasty =

Imperial Ethiopian dynasty (1270–1974)

Solomonic dynasty ሰሎሞናዊው ሥርወ መንግሥት Sälomonawīwi širiwä menigišiti House of Solomon
- Country: Ethiopian Empire
- Origin: Bete Amhara
- Founded: 1270 AD
- Founder: Menelik I (Mythical); Yekuno Amlak (Historical)
- Current head: Zera Yacob Amha Selassie
- Final ruler: Haile Selassie
- Titles: Emperor of Ethiopia -- Atse; King of Kings/Queen of Kings -- Negusa Nagast/Negesta Nagastat; Negus; Elect of God; King of Zion; King of Abyssinia; Duke; Ras; Leul
- Deposition: 12 September 1974
- Cadet branches: Gondarine Branch (later forms the Tigrean & Gojjam regional families); Shewan Branch

The Solomonic dynasty was the ruling dynasty of the Ethiopian Empire from the 13th to 20th centuries. The dynasty was founded in 1270 AD, by Yekuno Amlak. The dynasty remained in power until 1974, when its last Emperor Haile Selassie I was overthrown by the Derg in the 1974 Ethiopian Revolution.

== Origins (1270 AD - 1606 AD) ==
=== Foundation ===
The Solomonic dynasty is the name given by modern historians to the line of Ethiopian Orthodox Christian monarchs that ruled Ethiopia from the late 13th century to 1974. The dynasty was founded by Yekuno Amlak, a noble from the Kingdom of Shewa. During his ascent, he overthrew the last ruler of Ethiopia's Zagwe dynasty, established his capital at Bete Amhara (modern-day South Wollo Zone and North Shewa Zone) in 1270 and seized power over the previously-Zagwe northern provinces.

=== Solomonic origin myth ===
Ethiopian mythology states that Yekuno Amlak is a direct male line descendant of the royal house of the Kingdom of Aksum. The Aksumite kings had ruled much of Ethiopia from the 1st to the 10th centuries AD when they had been replaced by the Zagwe dynasty. Through the Aksumite royal house, it was also claimed that he was a descendant of the legendary king Menelik I, the son of the biblical King Solomon and the Queen of Sheba of the Davidic line. The canonical form of the claim was set out in legends recorded in the Kebra Nagast, a 14th-century text. According to this, the Queen of Sheba, who supposedly came from Aksum, visited Jerusalem where she conceived a son with Solomon. On her return to her homeland of Ethiopia, she gave birth to the child, Menelik I. He and his descendants (which included the Aksumite royal house) ruled Ethiopia until overthrown by the Zagwe usurpers. Yekuno Amlak, as a supposed direct descendant of Menelik I, was therefore claimed to have "restored" the Solomonic line.

In reality, King Solomon is dated to the 10th century BCE, hundreds of years before the founding of Aksum. Historian Harold G. Marcus additionally describes the stories of the Kebra Nagast as a "pastiche of legends" created to legitimize Yekuno Amlak's seizure of power. David Northrup notes that

the Kebra Nagast's imaginative and emotive account of a line of descent from Solomon and Sheba to the kings of Aksum and the new Solomonic dynasty is highly improbable and unsupported by evidence. It is a myth.

Nevertheless, the origin story became embedded in the Ethiopian sense of nationhood. This and the dynasty's continued propagation of the myth was reflected in the 1955 Ethiopian constitution, which declared that the emperor "descends without interruption from the dynasty of Menelik I, son of Queen of Ethiopia, the Queen of Sheba and King Solomon of Jerusalem".

During much of the dynasty's existence, its effective realm was the central and northern highlands present-day Ethiopia, the Ethiopian Highlands with its capitals (which shifted around) remained firmly in the Amhara Region. Its first capital-region was in Bete Amhara under Yekuno Amlak in 1270. Then Emperor Zera Yaqob I established the first capital city at Debre Birhan on March 7, 1456. With the instability occurring in the area, Emperor Fasilides moved the capital to Gondar in the north in 1636. Finally with the ascent of Emperor Menelik II in 1889, the capital was moved to Addis Abeba in the Kingdom of Shewa (prior to this, Yohannes IV held the capital at Mekelle for 17 years before his death). The Empire's exterior boundaries expanded and contracted over the centuries, sometimes incorporating parts of modern-day Eritrea, Sudan and South Sudan, and coastal areas of the Red Sea and Gulf of Aden. The southern and eastern regions of modern Ethiopia were permanently incorporated during the last two centuries, by the emperors Menelik II and Haile Selassie I. Although part of the eastern regions regions were previously incorporated into the empire under Amda Seyon I and Zara Yaqob, peripheral areas were lost after the invasion of Ahmad Ibrahim.

== Gondarine Period (1606 AD - 1889 AD) ==
The Gondarine Amhara line, starting with Susenyos I in 1606 (although often credited to his son Fasilides who established his capital at Gondar) ended its rule with the death of Yohannes IV in 1889.

Prior to Yohannes, however was Tewodros II. Despite his large legacy on the Solomonic empire, his claim to royal Solomonic descent was never entirely determined. Following Tewodros, Wagshum Gobeze claimed the throne linking himself to the last independent Gondarine emperors through his mother, Aychesh Tedla, a descendant of Iyasu I, and reigned as emperor of Ethiopia with the title Tekle Giyorgis II for some years, highly investing in the renovation of churches and monuments in Gondar. Being also an heir to the Zagwe throne, his reign was meant to be a unification of both dynasties in the enthronement of a king bearing both lineages. Tekle Giyorgis II's position became increasingly complicated to assert ascension especially with competing rivals Ras Kassa (who became Yohannes IV) and Sahle Maryam (who became Menelik II). Ras Kassa who had sided with the British during the Battle of Magdala, received substantial quantities of firearms, artillery and ammunition, which significantly strengthened his military and prepared him to ultimately defeat Tekle Giyorgis II and receive the throne at the Battle of Assam. Yohannes IV in 1872 was crowned Emperor of Ethiopia, with his legitimacy stemming from his Gondarine royal blood cognatically (through female lines) via his paternal grandmother, Woizero Workewoha KaleKristos of Adwa. He ruled for 17 years, and was killed at the Battle of Gallabat with the Mahdists in 1889. His heirs returned to Tigray and ruled locally until the Ethoipian Revolution of 1974 toppled all forms of monarchy in Ethiopia.

== Shewan Period (1889 - 1974) ==
The Shewan Amhara line, then rose to the imperial throne starting with Menelik II, who was king of Shewa from 1866 to 1889 and Emperor of Ethiopia from 1889 to his death in 1913. His daugther Zewditu, ruled in succession. As she died without an heir, she would be the last of the Ethiopian monarchs who could claim uninterrupted direct male descent from Solomon of Israel and the Queen of Sheba (both Lij Iyasu and Haile Selassie were in the female line, Lij Iyasu through his mother Shewarega Menelik, and Haile Selassie through his paternal grandmother, Tenagnework Sahle Selassie).

=== Fall of the Empire ===
The Solomonic Dynasty continued to rule Ethiopia with few interruptions until 1974, when the last emperor, Haile Selassie, was deposed. The Imperial family is currently non-regnant. Members of the family in Ethiopia at the time of the 1974 Ethiopian Revolution were imprisoned; some were executed and others exiled. In 1976, ten great-grandchildren of Haile Selassie were extracted from Ethiopia in an undertaking later detailed in a book by Jodie Collins, titled Code Word: Catherine. The women of the dynasty were released by the regime from prison in 1989, and the men were released in 1990. Several members were then allowed to leave the country in mid-1990, and the rest left in 1991 upon the fall of the communist régime. Many members of the Imperial family have since returned to live in Ethiopia.

The Shewan line was next on the Imperial throne with the coronation of Menelik II, previously Menelik King of Shewa, in 1889. The Shewan Branch of the Imperial Solomonic dynasty, like the Gondarine line, could trace uninterrupted male line descent from King Yekonu Amlak, though Abeto Negassi Yisaq, the grandson of Dawit II by his youngest son Abeto Yaqob. The direct male line ended with Menelik II, who was succeeded first by the son of his daughter Lij Iyasu from 1913 to 1916, then by his daughter Zewditu until 1930, and finally by the son of a first cousin in the female line, Haile Selassie. Haile Selassie's reign lasted until 1974, when the dynasty was removed from power. His grandson Prince Zera Yacob is his legal heir and therefore the current head of the Imperial dynasty.

During the Zemene Mesafint the Yejju Oromo dynasty did not destroy the regional autonomy of Gojjam. They instead replaced these defiant leaders with their own kinsmen (like Gugsa's son, Alula) or assimilated local elites who would ensure Gojjam's political instituions were in line with Yejju political trajectories. Ultimately it was Ras Goshu Zewde (Dejazmach Zewde's own son) who became the first prince, establishing the House of Gojjam. In this sense, it can be described as a regional house, separate from the two major branches (Gondar and Shewa) of the Solomonic Dynasty. Its most recent members include Tekle Haymanot of Gojjam; his son Leul Ras Hailu Tekle Haimanot, who was the most senior Ethiopian noble who submitted to the Italian occupation of 1936–1941; and his nephew Leul Ras Hailu Belew, who was a noted figure in the resistance against the Italian occupation.

== Coat of arms ==
Flag of the Imperial Standard of the Solomonic dynasty with the Lion of Judah (a symbol of the dynasty dating back to medieval times), otherwise known as the imperial flag (1870?–1936, 1941–1974). It remains popular with the Rastafari movement, monarchists, and Ethiopian nationalists.

The Imperial coat of arms was adopted by Haile Selassie I, and is currently held by his direct heir in the male line, Prince Zera Yacob, and by the Crown Council of Ethiopia. The arms are composed of an Imperial Throne flanked by two angels, one holding a sword and a pair of scales, the other holding the Imperial sceptre. The throne is often shown with a globus cruciger and a Star of David, representing the Christian and Jewish traditions. It is surmounted by a red mantle with the Imperial Crown, and before the throne is the Lion of the Tribe of Judah. The Lion of Judah was the central emblem of the Ethiopian tricolour during the reign of the monarchy, and now serves as the chief symbol of the Ethiopian monarchist movement. The Lion of Judah has also been adopted as the leading religious symbol for the Rastafari movement (a Western, African diasporic religious movement) that regards Emperor Haile Selassie as divine.

The phrase "Moa Ambassa ze imnegede Yehuda" (Conquering Lion of the Tribe of Judah) appeared on the arms, and always preceded the Emperor's official style and titles. The official Imperial Dynastic motto was "Ityopia tabetsih edewiha habe Igziabiher" (Ethiopia stretches her hands unto God), a quote from the Psalm 68:31.

The full title of the Emperor of Ethiopia was Negusa Nagast and Seyoume Igziabeher (Ge'ez: ሥዩመ እግዚአብሔር; "Elect of God"). The title Moa Anbessa Ze Imnegede Yehuda ("Conquering Lion of the Tribe of Judah") always preceded the titles of the Emperor. It was not a personal title but rather referred to the title of Jesus and placed the office of Christ ahead of the Emperor's name in an act of Imperial submission. Until the reign of Yohannes IV, the Emperor was also Neguse Tsion (Ge'ez: ንጉሠ ጽዮን, 'nəgusä tsiyon)', "King of Zion"), whose seat was at Axum, and which conferred hegemony over much of the north of the Empire (see: Ethiopian aristocratic and court titles).

== List of Rulers ==
The leaders of Ethiopia from 1270 to 1974:

Term	Birth Name	Throne Name	Notes
Early Solomonic Period (1270 AD - 1606 AD)
1270 to 1285	Yekuno Amlak	Tasfa Iyasus	
1285 to 1294	Yagbe'u Seyon	Salomon I	
1294 to 1295	Senfa Ared IV		
1295 to 1296	Hezba Asgad		
1296 to 1297	Qedma Asgad		
1297 to 1298	Jin Asgad		
1298 to 1299	Saba Asgad		
1299 to 1314	Wedem Arad		
1314 to 1344	Amda Seyon I	Gabra Masqal I	
1344 to 1372	Newaya Krestos	Sayfa Ar`ed	
1372 to 1382	Newaya Maryam	Wedem Asfare; or Gemma Asfare	
1382 to 1413	Dawit I (David)		
1413 to 1414	Tewodros I (Theodore)	Walda Ambasa	Ruled 9 months
1414 to 1429	Yeshaq I (Isaac)	Gabra Masqal II	
1429 to 1430	Andreyas (Andrew)		
1430 to 1433	Takla Maryam	Hezba Nan	
1433	Sarwe Iyasus	Mehreka Nan	
1433 to 1434	Amda Iyasus	Badel Nan	
1434 to 1468	Zara Yaqob	Kuestantinos I (Constantine I)	Dating becomes certain here
1468 to 1478	Baeda Maryam I		
1478 to 1494	Eskender (Alexander)	Constantine II	
1494	Amda Seyon II		
1494 to 1508	Na'od		
1508 to 1540	Dawit II (David II)	Lebna Dengel	
1540 to 1559	Gelawdewos (Claudius)	Asnaf Sagad I	
1559 to 1563	Menas	Admas Sagad I	
1563 to 1597	Sarsa Dengel	Malak Sagad I	
1597 to 1603	Yaqob (Jacob)	Malak Sagad II	
1603 to 1604	Za Dengel	Asnaf Sagad II	
1604 to 1607	Yaqob (Jacob)	Malak Sagad II	Restored
1607 to 1632	Susenyos	Malak Sagad III	Crowned March 18, 1608
Gondarine Period (1606 AD - 1889 AD)
1632 to 1667	Fasilides (Basilides)	`Alam Sagad	
1667 to 1682	Yohannes I (John I)		
19 July 1682 to 13 October 1706	Iyasus I (Iyasus the Great)	Adyam Sagad II	
1685	Yeshaq Iyasu ?		In opposition
27 March 1706 to 30 June 1708	Tekle Haymanot I	Le`al Sagad	
September 1707	Amda Seyon		A usurper
1 July 1708 to 14 October 1711	Tewoflos (Theophilus)	Walda Ambasa	
1709 to July 1710	Nebahne Yohannes		In opposition
14 October 1711 to 19 February 1716	Yostos (Justus)	Sahay Sagad	A usurper
8 February 1716 to 18 May 1721	Dawit III (David)	Adabar Sagad	
18 May 1721 to 1730	Bakaffa	Asma Sagad or Masih Sagad	
19 September 1730 to 26 June 1755	Iyasus II (Jesus II)	Adyam Sagad	
1736 to 1737	Hezqeyas		In opposition
26 June 1755 to 7 May 1769	Iyoas (Joas)		
7 May to 18 October 1769	Yohannes II (John II)		
18 October 1769 to June 1770	Tekle Haymanot II		
June to December 1770	Susenyos II		
18 October 1769 to 13 April 1777	Tekle Haymanot II		Restored
13 April 1777 to 20 July 1779	Salomon II (Solomon II)		
20 July 1779 to 8 February 1784	Tekle Giyorgis		
16 February 1784 to 24 April 1788	Iyasus III (Jesus III)		
1787 to 1788	Iyasus		In opposition
1787 to 1788	Baeda Maryam		In opposition
February 1788 to 1789	Tekle Haymanot		In opposition
24 April 1788 to 26 July 1789	Tekle Giyorgis		Restored
26 July 1789 to January 1794	Hezqeyas (Hezekiah)		
January 1794 to 15 April 1795	Tekle Giyorgis		Restored
15 April to December 1795	Baeda Maryam II		
December 1795 to 20 May 1796	Tekle Giyorgis		Restored
20 May 1796 to 15 July 1797	Salomon III (Solomon III)		
18 August 1797 to 4 January 1798	Yonas (Jonah)		
4 January 1798 to 20 May 1799	Tekle Giyorgis		Restored
20 May 1799 to 1799	Salomon III (Solomon III)		Restored
1799 to 24 March 1800	Demetros (Demetrius)		
24 March to June 1800	Tekle Giyorgis		Restored
June 1800 to June 1801	Demetros		
June 1801 to June 3, 1818	Egwale Seyon		
June 19, 1818 to June 3, 1821	Iyoas II (Joas II)		
June 3, 1821 to April 1826	Gigar		
April 1826	Baeda Maryam III		
April 1826 to June 18, 1830	Gigar		Restored
18 June 1830 to 18 March 1832	Iyasus IV (Jesus IV)		
18 March 1832 to 1832	Gebre Krestos		
1832	Sahle Dengel		
1832 to 8 June 1832	Gebre Krestos		Restored
October 1832 to 29 August 1840	Sahlae Dengel		Restored
1832	Egwale Anbesa		In rebellion
30 August 1840 to October 1841	Yohannes III (John III)		
October 1841 to 1845	Sahle Dengel		Restored
1845	Yohannes III (John III)		Restored
1845 to 1850	Sahle Dengel		Restored
1850 to 1851	Yohannes III (John III)		Restored
1851 to 11 February 1855	Sahle Dengel		Restored
9 February 1855 to 13 April 1868	Kasse Hailu	Tewodros II (Theodore II)	
11 June 1868 to 11 July 1871	Wagshum Gobeze	Tekle Giyorgis II	
11 July 1871 to 9 March 1889	Kassa Mercha	Yohannes IV (John IV)	Tigrean through parentage, but descended from the Gondarine Branch
Shewan Period (1889 AD - 1974 AD)
9 March 1889 to 12 December 1913	Sahle Maryam (dejazmach)	Menelik II	
12 December 1913 to 27 September 1916	Lij Kifle Yaqub	Iyasu V	Deposed by nobles with the sanction of the Ethiopian Orthodox Church
27 September 1916 to 2 April 1930	Askala Maryam	Zewditu, Empress	♀
2 April 1930 to 2 May 1936	Tafari Makonnen	His Imperial Majesty, Emperor Haile Selassie, King of Kings, Lord of Lords, Elect of God, Conquering Lion of the Tribe of Judah	Crowned 2 November 1930

== Gallery ==
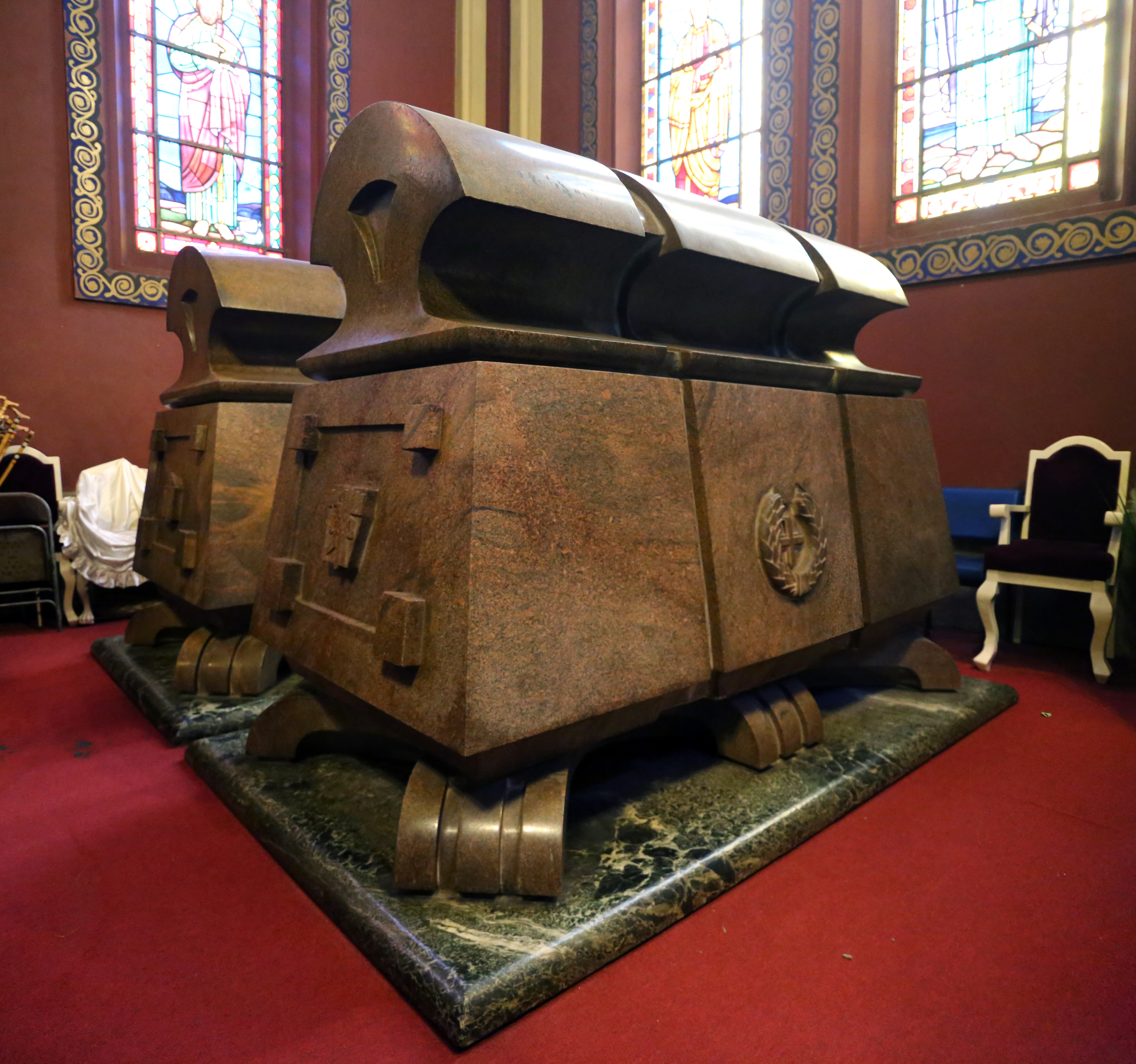
Imperial sarcophagi of the Solomonic Dynasty Emperor Haile Selassie I and his wife at the Holy Trinity Cathedral

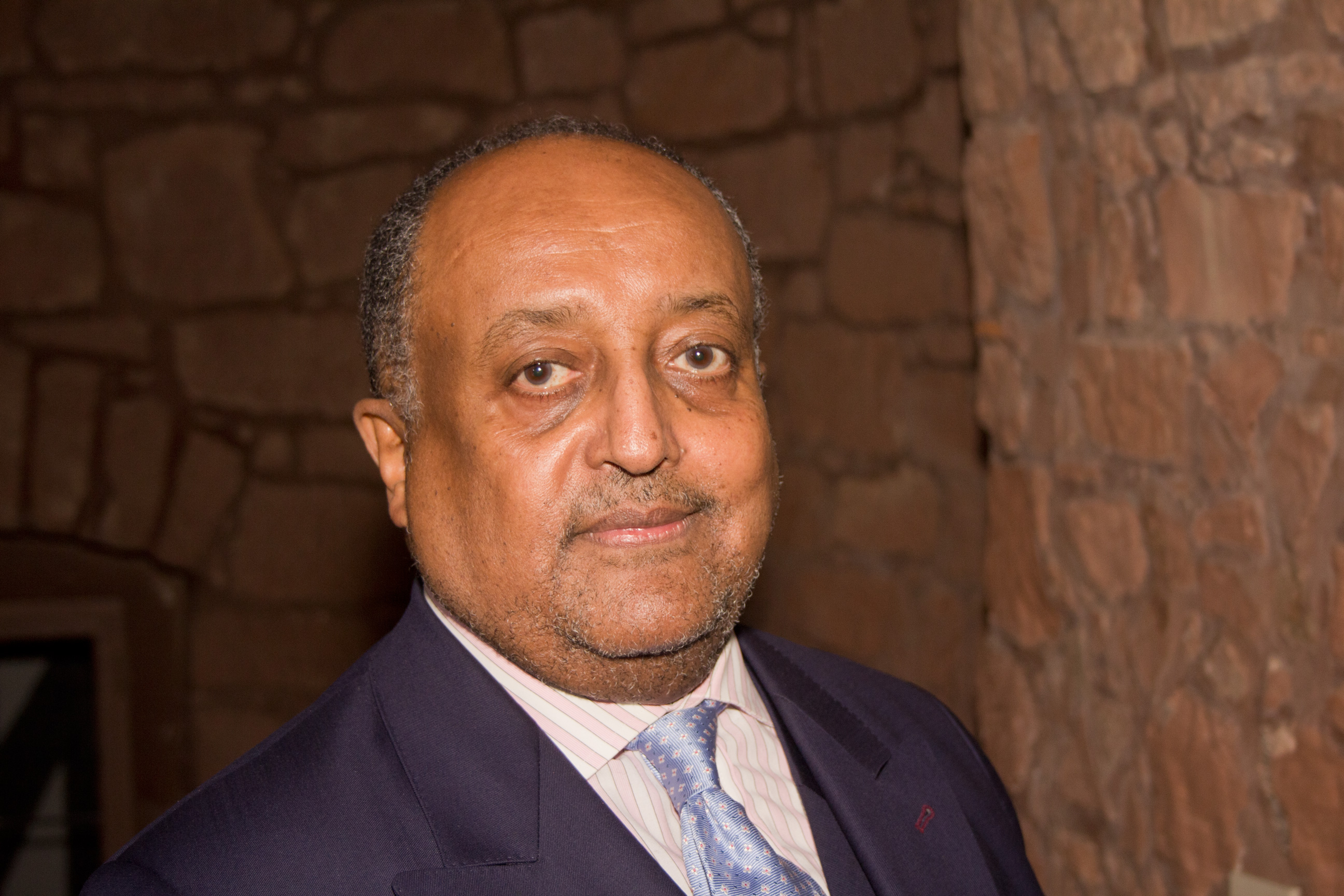
Prince Asfa-Wossen Asserate, a member of the Solomonic dynasty

Imperial Standard (obverse)

Imperial Standard (reverse)

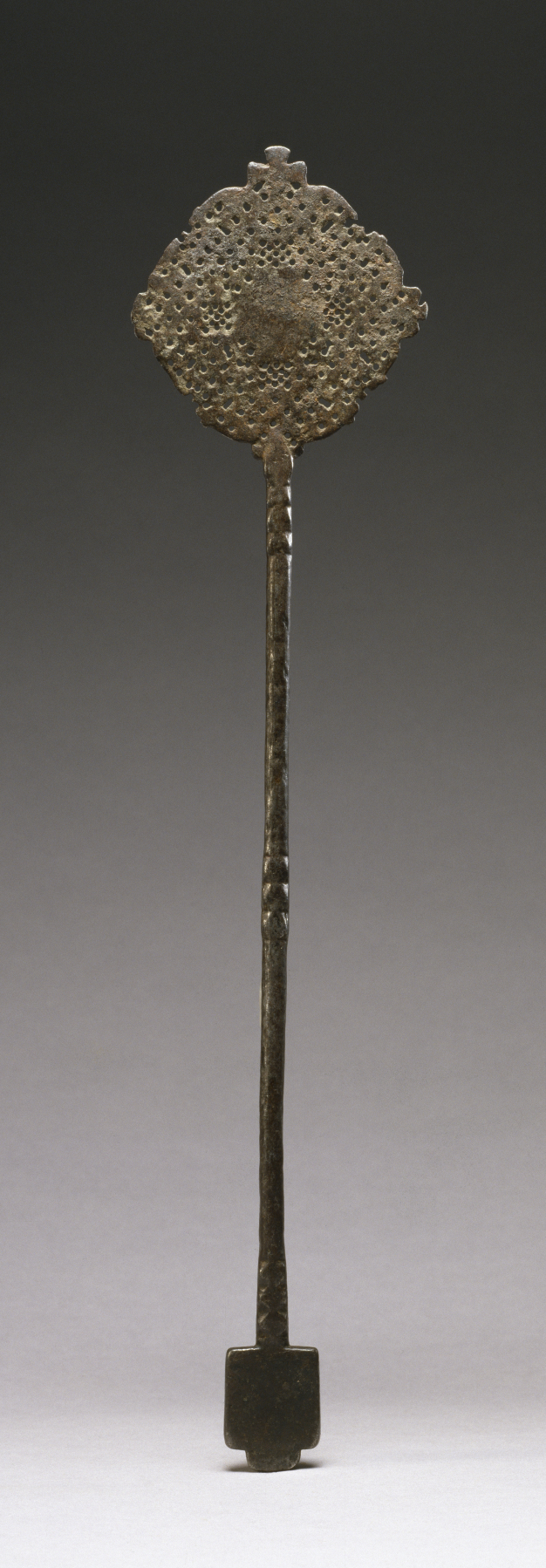
13th-century Solomonic hand cross

European depiction of the symbol of Ethiopia, a lion holding a patriarchal cross

== See also ==
- List of emperors of Ethiopia
  - Emperors of Ethiopia Family tree
- Ethiopian aristocratic and court titles
- Crown Council of Ethiopia
- Order of Solomon
- Order of Saint Mary of Zion
- Regnal lists of Ethiopia

== Bibliography ==
- Marie-Laure Derat, Le domaine des rois éthiopiens (1270–1527), Paris, Publications de la Sorbonne, 2003, 383 pp.
