= Newaya Maryam =

Emperor of Ethiopia from 1372 to 1382

Newaya Maryam ዐፄ ንዋየ ማርያም

Emperor of Ethiopia
- Reign: 1372–1382
- Predecessor: Newaya Krestos
- Successor: Dawit I
- Dynasty: Solomonic dynasty
- Father: Newaya Krestos
- Religion: Ethiopian Orthodox

Newaya Maryam (Ge'ez: ንዋየ ማርያም; throne name Wedem Asfare or Gemma Asfare) was Emperor of Ethiopia from 1372 to 1382, and a member of the Solomonic dynasty. He was the eldest son of Newaya Krestos.

== Reign ==
During his reign, Haqq ad-Din II of the Walasma dynasty gained control of the kingdom of Ifat on the southeastern frontier of Ethiopia in 1376, declared himself independent and began raids against the Ethiopian Empire. Haqq ad-Din was eventually defeated and killed by the forces of the Emperor Newaya Maryam in 1386. According to E. A. Wallis Budge, the Royal Chronicles state that "little was known about" Newaya Maryam, and he died without issue. He was buried at Asar, but his descendant Emperor Baeda Maryam I had his body re-interred at the church of Atronsa Maryam.

== Notes ==
Regnal titles
Preceded by Newaya Krestos	Emperor of Ethiopia; 1372–1382	Succeeded by Dawit I
