= Tadbaba Maryam =

Church in South Wollo Zone, Amhara Region, Ethiopia

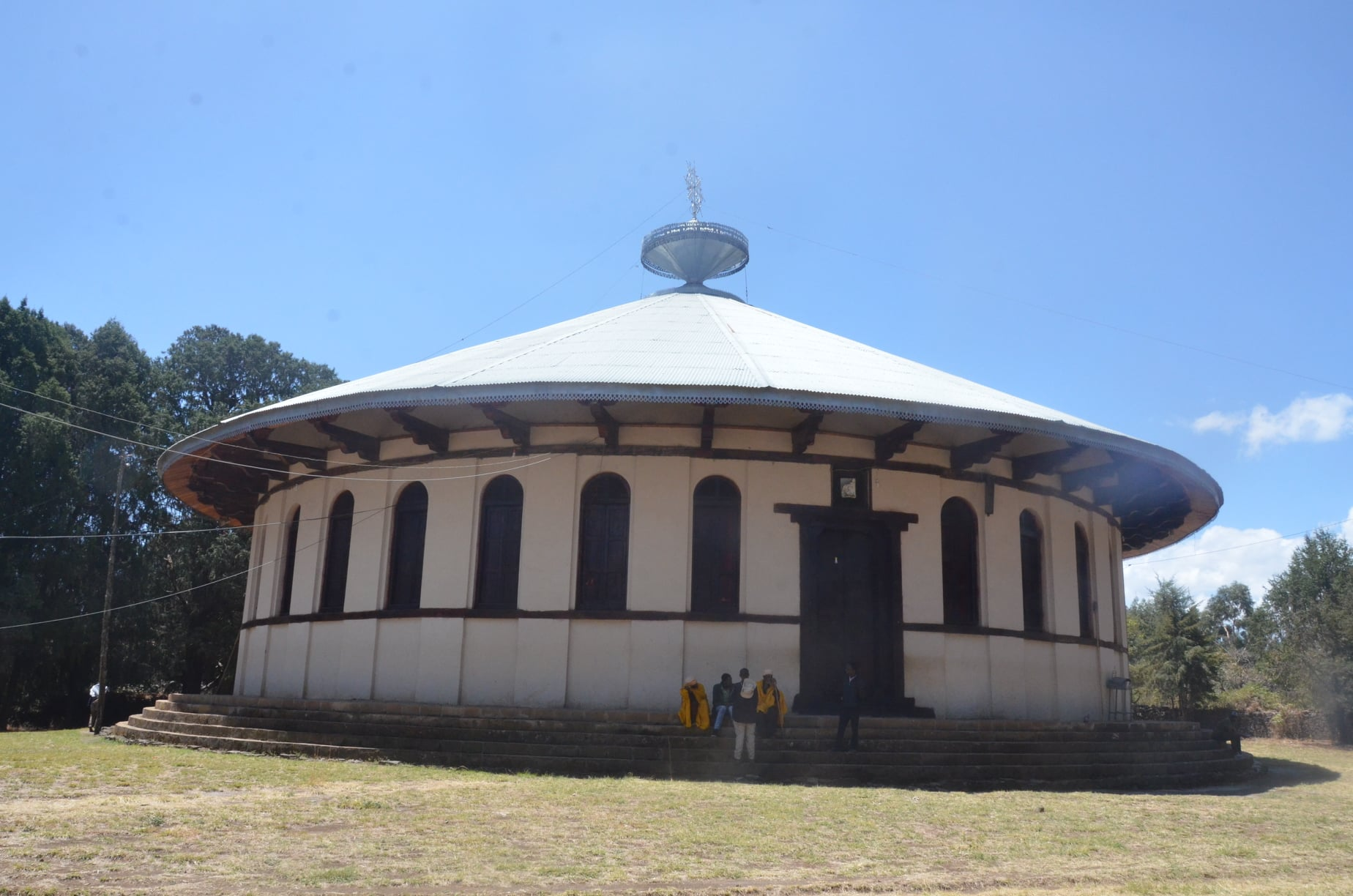
- Main church building

- Location within Ethiopia

Religion
- Affiliation: Ethiopian Orthodox Tewahedo Church
- Status: Active

Location
- Location: Sayint, South Wollo, Amhara Region, Ethiopia
- Interactive map of Tadbaba Maryam
- Coordinates: 11.114074°N 38.753427°E

Architecture
- Style: Medieval Ethiopian architecture
- Founder: Gelawdewos
- Established: 982 BCE

Tadbaba Maryam, (Ge'ez: ተድባበ ማርያም/ጽዮን) also called Tadbaba Zion in ancient times (meaning "Umbrella of St Mary/Zion"), is an Ethiopian Orthodox Tewahedo church located in the place of Sayint in South Wollo, Amhara Region, Ethiopia. The current church bears the title in full "Head of Churches and Monasteries Tadbaba Maryam" (also in Amharic: ርዕሰ አድባራት ወገዳማት ተድባበ ማርያም).

== History ==
Tadbaba Maryam was amongst the first four Temples where sacrificial offerings were implemented in Ethiopia before birth of Jesus. The name is a combination two Ge'ez words: Tadbaba means Tabernacle, Maryam/ Tsion means Zion which gives 'The Tabernacle of Zion'. According to the chronicle of the Tadbaba Maryam, the Ark of Tadbaba Maryam arrived in 982 BCE which coincides with disappearance of the Ark of the Covenant or the reign of King Solomon (between 970 and 931 BCE).

== Construction ==
The current church of Tadbaba Maryam is spectacular in its design and was built by Emperor Gelawdewos after he won the war with Ahmad ibn Ibrahim al-Ghazi, the Battle of Wayna Daga. The Ark was carried into the Battle of Wayna Daga, the final battle against Ahmad ibn Ibrahim al-Ghazi, where Gelawdewos cut off the Imam's head. Prior to Gelawdewos, while kept in the Tabernacle, the Ark was moved around, but was eventually placed in the Temple founded by King Gelawdewos.

The church is a circular complex with four doors (>3m height) and 32 windows (>2m height) on the outside. By design, the church is arranged in concentric circles with three sections. The inner most section at the center being the inner sanctum (Holy of Holies) and is about 24 meters in diameter. This is where the Ark of the Covenant is believed to be kept, explicitly inside a tent (Tabernacle). In its current form, the church overall measures about 34 meters in diameter.

== Religious activity ==
The high priest are always selected from tribes of the priestly class, believed to be descendants of Jews. In additions, Deacons, only under the age of 9, are allowed to deliver service. Most of the relics and utilities used in the church are made of pure gold including incense burner (censer with chain). When entering the Holy of Holies, a rope is tied to high priest to enable assistants to safely pull body of the high priest out of the inner-sanctum in the event of mishap. Abuna Takla Haymanot, 3rd Patriarch of EOC, attempted to enter the Holy of Holies and was pulled out by a rope, but died a year later in 1988.

A story is told about a plague that infested the land following an event of mishap in front of the Ark during an annual festivity. Later the people of the land were also afflicted of boils and disease. Since then, the Ark has never been carried outside of its tent or shown to the people during congregation.

== Treasures gallery ==
Tadbaba Maryam possesses a huge collection of treasures, some of them date back to the time of the Old Testament. The collections are now displayed in a museum inside the churches compound. The most known relics include:

- An ancient cross with special design on it in the form of a Sheep. Also called Na'wa Bagu, (Behold the Lamb).
- The Shield of Atse Kaleb used in defeating the rebellious faction in Yemen.
- Hebrew Synodus.
- Liturgy in Aramaic language.
- Books written in Aramaic language.
- Several books written in Ge'ez and Arabic language.
- Gospel decorated with Gold.
- Hand cross used by the first Ethiopian Patriarch.
- Cross Used by St. John the Baptist.
- Hand cross used by Abune Echege Yohannes.
- Hand cross used by Abune Anorios.
- Hand cross used by Abune Kerlos.
- A section of the hair of Saint Anne (the mother of St. Mary).
- A collection of remains of innocent children massacred by king Herod.
- Relics of St. George (the thumb bone).
- Relics of other unspecified martyrs (about 28 skeletons).
- Remains of more than 6 kings including Galawdewos.
- Throne of Emperor Dawit I
- The Book of Adam.
- More than 1000 unspecified manuscripts.
- St. Luke Ikons of St. Mary. Also called Se'el Adheno (The Saving Picture).
- Several unspecified hand crosses.
- Various unspecified ancient relics.
- Gifts provided by various kings and Patriarchs.
- A signed collection of the Miracles of Mary, paintings by Brancaleon.
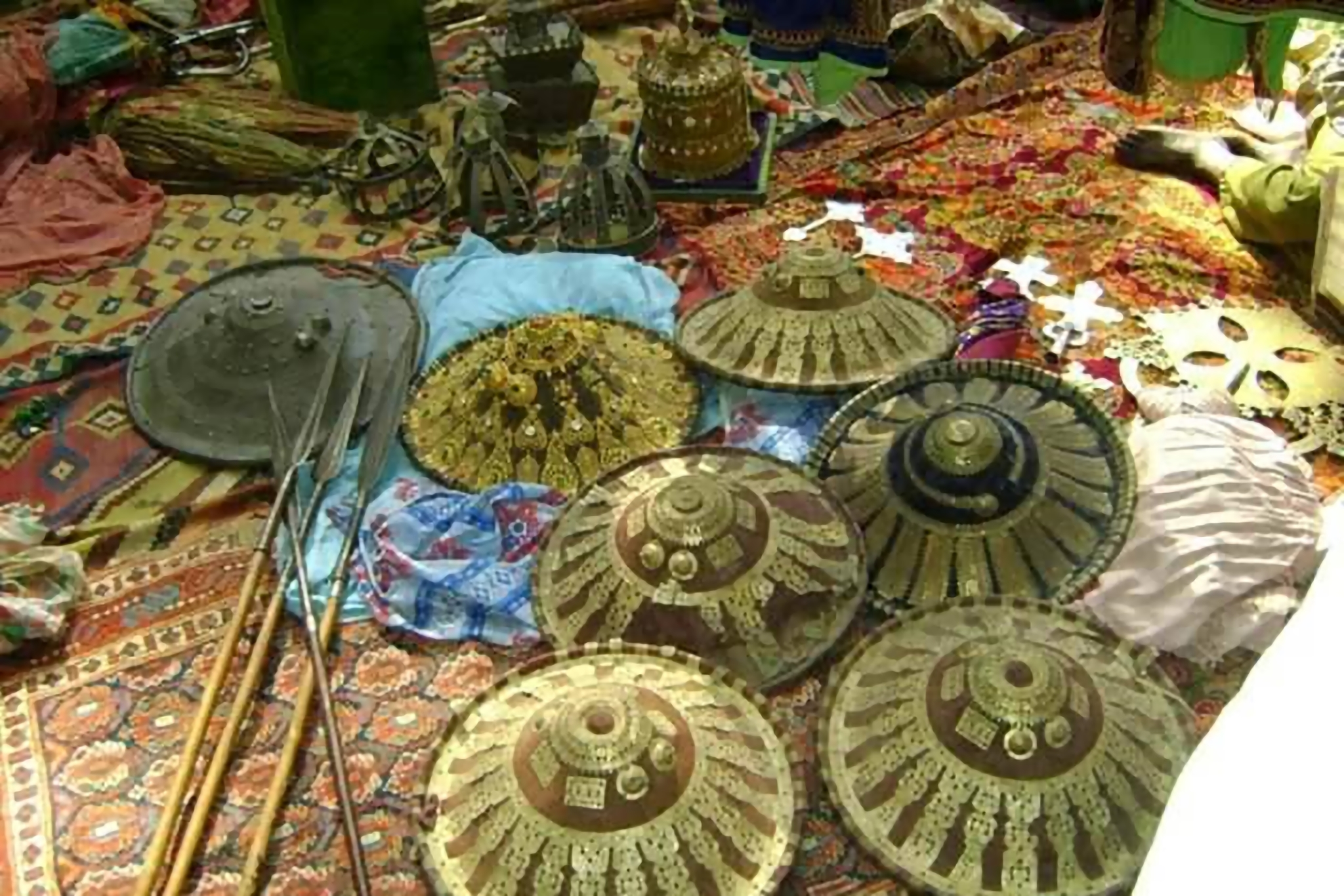
Display of some of the thesaurus of Tadbaba Maryam

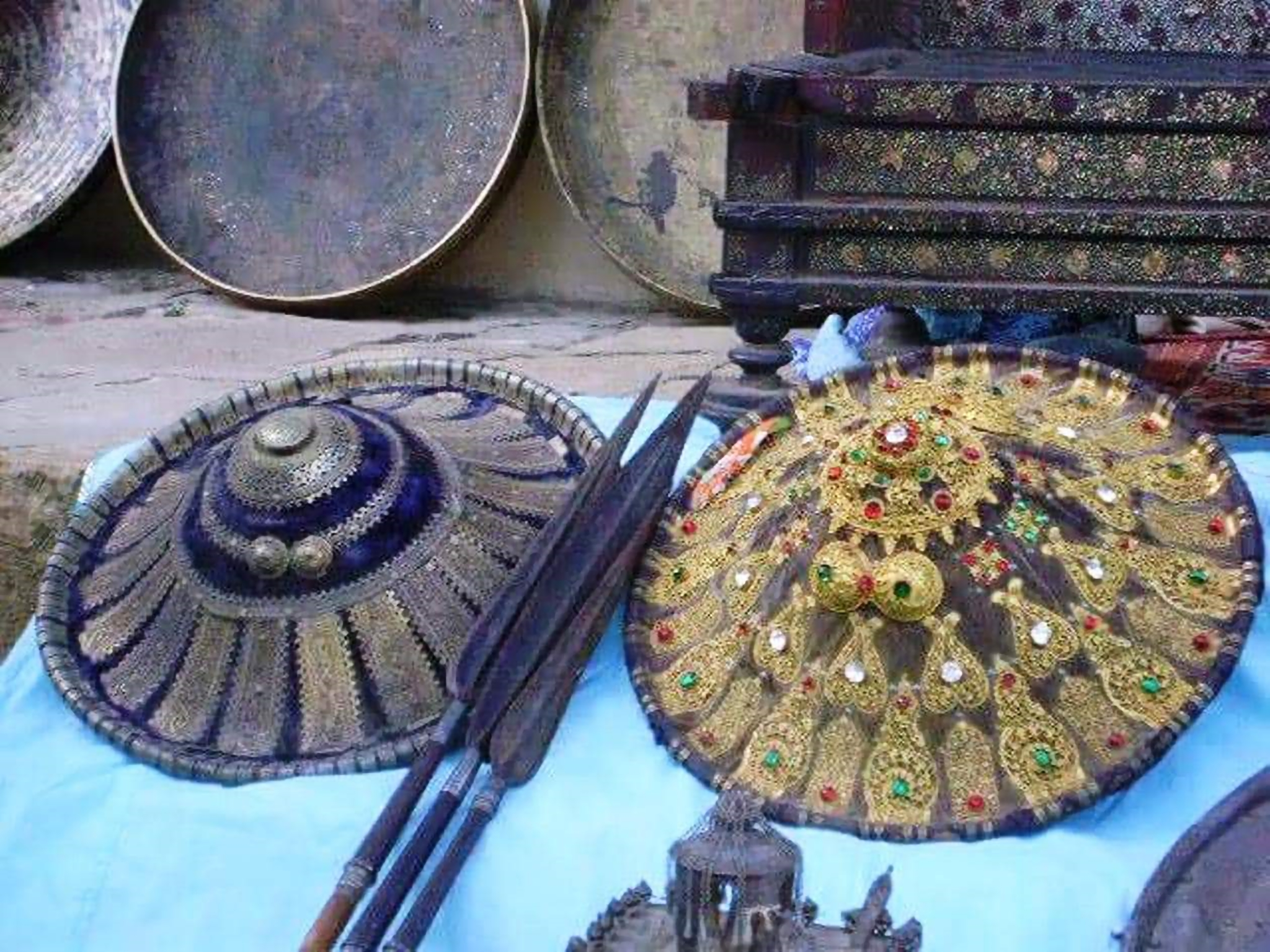
Various gifts from Ethiopian Emperors

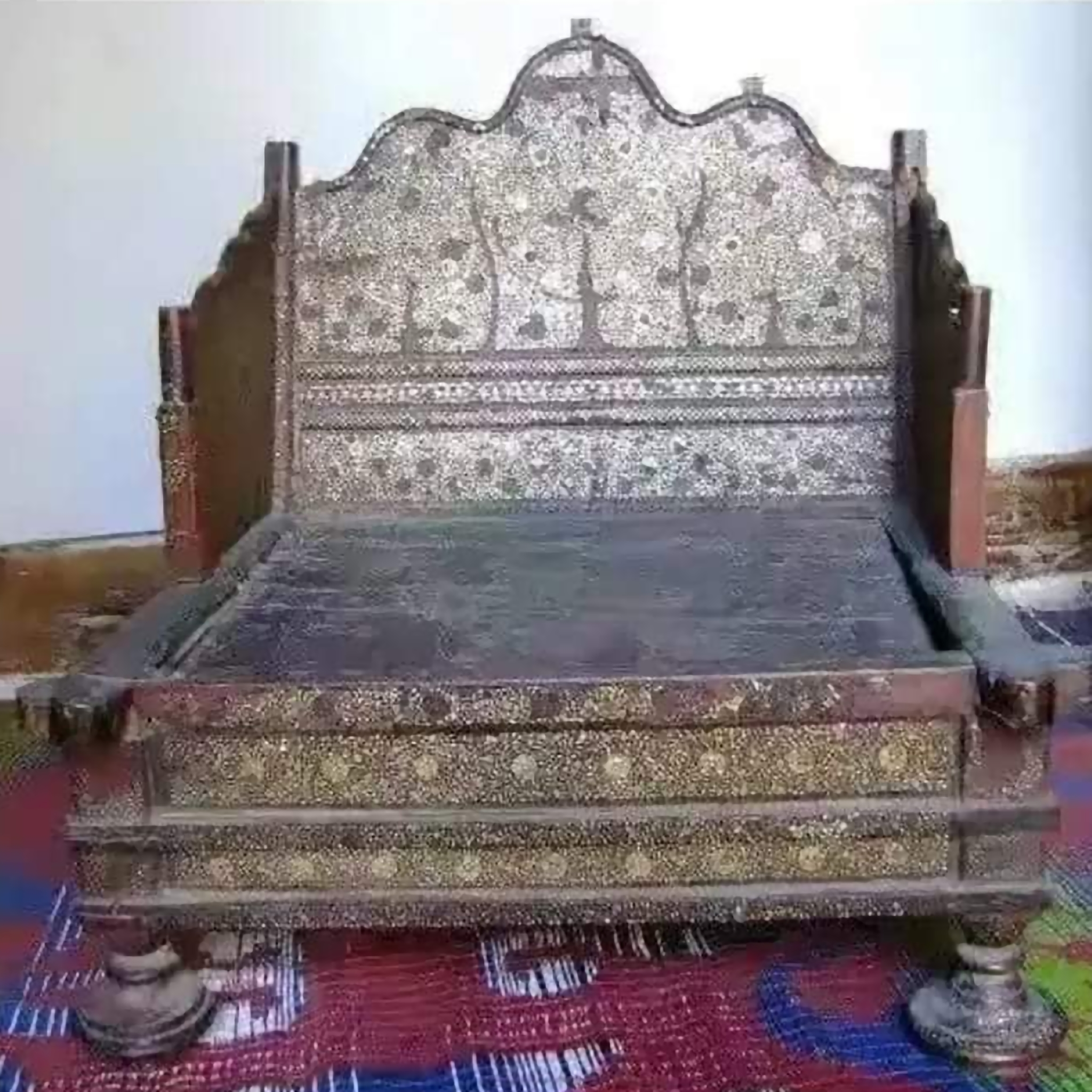
The Throne of King Dawit made of Whale skin

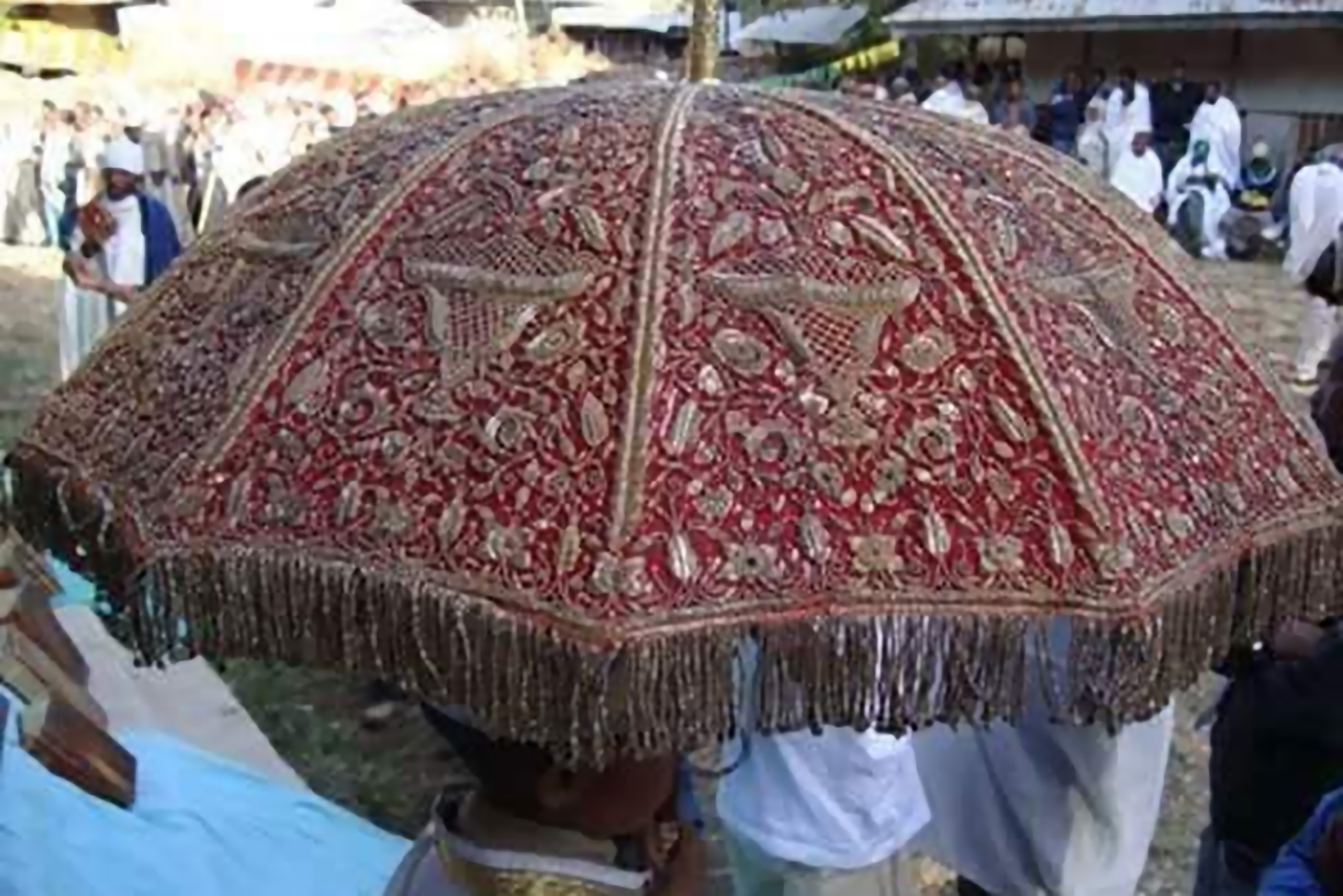
An old traditionally crafted umbrella veneered with gold and red velvet

== See also ==
- Church of Our Lady Mary of Zion
