= Giovanni da Carignano =

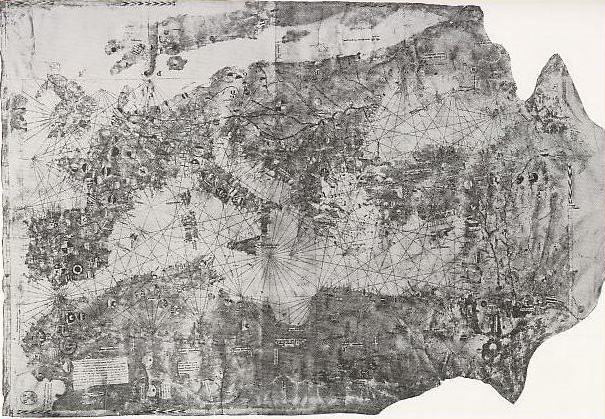
Portolan chart of Giovanni da Carignano

Giovanni da Carignano (Genoa, c. 1250 – Genoa, 1329) was a priest and a pioneering cartographer from Genoa.

There is little certain information about his life. There is a Genoese document (dated June 9, 1291) referring to a certain Johannes de Mauro de Calignano, that is, Giovanni, son of Mauro, from Carignano. Other fragments suggest he had two brothers, Giacomo, a notary, and Anselmo, a doctor. Further documents suggest he was still alive in September 1329, but dead by May 1330.

From 1293 to 1329, Giovanni da Carignano was the rector of the church of San Marco al Molo ("Saint Mark at the Pier"), a parish in Genoa, just a few meters away from the bustling port of Genoa, arguably the most important seaport in the Mediterranean Sea at the time.

Carignano is important to the history of cartography as the author of an early 14th-century nautical portolan chart, depicting, with much skill, most of the world as then known to his Italian contemporaries (Europe, North Africa, Mediterranean, Black Sea and much of the Middle East). Although the northern reaches of Europe are unclear, it contains possibly the first depiction of Scandinavia as a peninsula. Carignano's portolan has been variously dated between 1305 and 1327.). If the earlier dates are accepted, then it might be the first known portolan signed by its author (i.e. before Pietro Vesconte's portolan of 1311). The signature read: Presbiter Johannes Rector sancti Marci de portu Ianue me fecit.

The Carignano chart was long held by the Archivio di Stato in Florence, Italy. Unfortunately, already fragile, the chart was destroyed in 1943 during a bombing of Naples, where it was temporarily on display. All that remains of it are a set of photographs and notes by earlier scholars.

A second mysterious Carignano map, dated 1306, is mentioned routinely in 19th-century lists, but without indication of its location or description of its content, and thus either never existed beyond rumor, or has long been lost.

In this map he joins the theological tradition that placed Jerusalem in the centre of a T-in-O scheme and the more accurate and up-to-date information.

In the port of Genoa (1306) he interviewed the ambassadors of the Abyssinian negus Wedem Arad; some scholars, as Silverberg, presume he was the first European to locate the legendary Prester John's Kingdom in Africa (Ethiopia) rather than in northern Asia.

== Bibliography ==
- ALMAGIÀ Roberto, Intorno alla più antica cartografia nautica catalana, in "Bollettino della Società Geografica Italiana", volume 81, 1945, pp. 20–27, p. 25.
- ASTENGO Corradino, La cartografia nautica medievale. Problemi vecchi e nuove ricerche, in "Mundus Novus", Genova, 2007, pp. 211–224.
- ASTENGO Corradino, Elenco di carte ed atlanti nautici medievali di autore genovese, in "Annali di ricerche e studi di geografia", XLVI (1990), pp. 4 s.
- ASTENGO Corradino, Giovanni da Carignano, in "Cartografi in Liguria (secoli XIV-XIX), Dizionario Storico dei Cartografi Italiani", a cura di M. Quaini e L. Rossi, Genova, Brigati, 2007, p. 45.
- CAMPBELL Tony, "Portolan Charts from the Late Thirteenth Century to 1500," in The History of Cartography, volume one, Cartography in Prehistoric, Ancient, and Medieval Europe and the Mediterranean, edited by J.B. Harley and David Woodward. Chicago: University of Chicago Press, 1987, pp. 371–463, in particular pp. 404–407.
- CAPACCI Alberto, La toponomastica nella cartografia nautica di tipo medievale, Genova, Brigati, 1994
- CARACI Giuseppe, Cimeli cartografici sconosciuti esistenti a Firenze – VII – VIII – IX, in "La Bibliofilia", 1927, p. 50.
- CARACI Giuseppe, Segni e colori degli spazi medievali. Italiani e catalani nella primitiva cartografia nautica medievale, a cura di Ilaria Luzzana Caraci, Reggio Emilia, Diabasis, 1993, pp. 46–58.
- DE ANNA Luigi, Conoscenza e immagine della Finlandia e del Settentrione nela cultura classico-medievale, in "Annales Universitatis Turkuensis", serie B, tomo 180, Turku 1988, in particolare pp. 327–333.
- DESIMONI Cornelio, Elenco di carte ed atlanti nautici di autore genovese oppure in Genova fatti o conservati in "Giornale Ligustico", II, 1875, pp. 41–71, in esp.p.44–45.
- Due mondi a confronto 1492-1728: Cristoforo Colombo e l’apertura degli spazi, a cura di Giuseppe Cavallo, Roma, IPZS, 1992, 2 vv.
- DUKEN A. J., Die mathematische Rekonstruktion der Portolankarte des Giovanni Carignano (ca. 1310). Bückeburg 1984, partially reproduced in DUKEN, A. J.: Reconstruction of the portolan chart of G. Carignano (c. 1310), in: "Imago Mundi", Vol 40 (1988), pp. 86–95.
- EDSON Evelyn, and SAVAGE SMITH, Emily, Medieval Views of the Cosmos, Oxford, The Bodleian Library, 2004.
- EDSON Evelyn, Mapping Time and Space: How Medieval Mapmakers viewed their World, London, British Library, 1997.
- FERRO Gaetano, La tradizione cartografica genovese e Cristoforo Colombo, in "Nuova Raccolta Colombiana", a cura di P.E. Taviani, XIII, Roma 1992, pp. 30–34
- GALLIANO Graziella, in "Dizionario Biografico degli Italiani", Roma, IPZS, article under letter M: "Mauro, Giovanni di Mauro da Carignano".
- GALLIANO Graziella, Le vie del Sudan, in "Caraci Le Americhe annunciate. Viaggi ed esplorazioni liguri prima di Colombo", a cura di I. Luzzana Caraci, Reggio Emilia 1991, pp. 133 s
- GASPAR Joaquim Alves: Dead reckoning and magnetic declination: unveiling the mystery of portolan charts. "e-Perimetron", Vol.3, No.4, 2008 [191-203], www.e-perimetron.org
- GAUTIER DALCHÉ Patrick, Carte marine et portulan au XIIe siècle. Le Liber de existencia rivieriarum et forma maris nostri Mediterranei, Pise, circa 1200, Roma, École Française de Rome, 1995, p. 10, p. 26 e p. 36.
- NANSEN Fridtjof, In Northern Mists; Arctic Exploration in Early Times, trans. Arthur G. Chater, New York, 1911, vol. 2, p. 221 e p. 235.
- NORDENSKIÖLD Adolf Erik von: Facsimile-atlas to the early history of cartography: with reproductions of the most important maps printed in the XV and XVI centuries, Stockholm 1889.
- NORDENSKIÖLD Adolf Erik von: Periplus : an essay on the early history of charts and sailing-directions; with numerous reprod. of old charts and maps, Stockholm 1897
- PUJADES I BATALLER Ramon J.: Les cartes portolanes: la representaciò medieval d'una mar solcada [With an English version of the text entitled, 'Portolan charts: the medieval representation of a ploughed sea', pp. 401–526]. (Barcelona: Institut Cartogràfic de Catalunya; Institut d'Estudis Catalans; Institut Europeu de la Mediterrània; Lunwerg, 2007).
- REVELLI Paolo, Cristoforo Colombo e la scuola cartografica genovese, Genova, CNR (Stabilimenti Italiani Arti Grafiche), 1937.
- Silverberg, Robert, The Realm of Prester John (Athens: Ohio University Press, 1972), pp. 164–165. ISBN 0-8214-1138-1.
- UZIELLI Gustavo and AMAT DI SAN FILIPPO Pietro, Studi biografici e bibliografici sulla storia della geografia in Italia, vol. II: Mappamondi, carte nautiche, portolani ed altri monumenti cartografici specialmente italiani dei secoli XIII-XVII, Roma, Società Geografica Italiana, 1888, pp. 49–50 (scheda numero 9).

Some photographic reproductions of the map (lost in 1943) in: ONGANIA, Ferdinando, Raccolta di mappamondi e carte nautiche dal XIII al SVI secolo, Venezia, 1875–1882, n.3; NORDENSKIÖLD, Adolf Erik von: Periplus: an essay on the early history of charts and sailing-directions; with numerous reprod. of old charts and maps, Stockholm 1897, table V note 14.
