= Newaya Krestos =

Emperor of Ethiopia from 1344 to 1372

Newaya Krestos ዐፄ ንዋየ ክርስቶስ

Emperor of Ethiopia
- Reign: 1344–1372
- Predecessor: Amda Seyon I
- Successor: Newaya Maryam
- Issue: Newaya Maryam, Dawit I
- Dynasty: Solomonic dynasty
- Father: Amda Seyon I
- Religion: Ethiopian Orthodox

Newaya Krestos (Ge'ez: ንዋየ ክርስቶስ; throne name: Sayf Ar'ed, lit. "sword of terror") was Emperor of Ethiopia from 1344 to 1372, and a member of the Solomonic dynasty. He was the eldest son of Amda Seyon I.

The principal antagonist of the Sirat Sayf ibn Dhi-Yazan, a 15th century Arabic epic set during the Axumite conquest of Yemen, is named Sayf Ar'ed. Likely inspired by the Negus due to his wars with neighboring Muslims, this reference to the emperor played a crucial role in dating the medieval work. The hero of the plot has the mission to redirect the waters of the Nile, held by the Ethiopians, back towards Egypt. This was doubtlessly inspired to the same threats made by contemporary emperors to the Mamluks, and that these conflicts were effectively an Egyptian proxy war.

== Reign ==
According to James Bruce, Newaya Krestos was present at his father's campaign against Salih, the king of Mora and Adal, which took place after Amda Seyon had put down the rebellion of Sabr ad-Din I of Ifat.

On the death of his father, Newaya Krestos had agreed to the entreaties of Abuna Yaqob to recall the monks his father had exiled and live a monogamous life unlike his polygamous predecessors; but he went back on his word, marrying three women. When Abuna Yaqob and the monastic leaders protested, the Emperor sent the Abuna back to Egypt, and exiled the monks to the southern parts of his kingdom.

During his reign Ali ibn Sabr ad-Din of the Walashma dynasty revolted. In response, Newaya Krestos campaigned along the eastern frontier of Ethiopia in the territories of Adal and Ifat. Due to lack of support from his subjects, Ali ad-Din's revolt was unsuccessful, and he was captured with all of his sons, effectively destroying the Sultanate of Ifat as an independent state. Newaya Krestos imprisoned Ali ad-Din and all of his sons except for Ahmad, whom the emperor made governor of Ifat. However, after eight years Ali was released from prison and returned to power; Ahmad and his sons were excluded from power, and it took the direct intervention of the Emperor for Ahmad to obtain a position over a single district.

Once the new Ifat Sultan Haqq ad-Din II was surrounded by numerous followers, he declared war on his two male relatives. They turned to the Ethiopian Emperor Newaya Krestos for help, but in a series of engagements Sultan Haqq ad-Din II defeated their combined army, and his uncle Mola Asfah was killed in battle. Haqq ad-Din triumphantly entered the city of Ifat, where he magnanimously confirmed his grandfather as titular ruler of the city; although he founded a new capital at Wahal. (Trimingham calls this new city Wafat.) Taddesse Tamrat notes that while this new location helped preserve Ifat's autonomy, it had a cost in that it gave up all of the dynastic political influence over Shewa and the neighboring Muslim kingdoms of Dawaro, Hadiya and Bale.

Despite his earlier actions against the Ethiopian Church, towards the end of his reign he aggressively helped the Patriarch of Alexandria Mark IV, who had been imprisoned by Al-Salih, the Sultan of Egypt. One step Newaya Krestos took was to imprison the Egyptian merchants in his kingdom; the other was to march on Egypt at the head of a numerous army. Tradition states that Patriarch Mark was freed and sent a delegation to convince the Emperor to return to his kingdom. Newaya Krestos did return, but he kept the delegation with him as his unwilling guests.

Newaya Krestos is also credited for rebuilding the ancient church Debre Igziabher that overlooks Lake Hayq. The structure was pillaged and burned by Imam Ahmad ibn Ibrahim al-Ghazi's forces in 1531. Copies of three charters first composed during his reign survive, which G.W.B. Huntingford uses as evidence that his rule extended as far north as Serae and Tigray.

== Notes ==
Regnal titles
Preceded by Amda Seyon I	Emperor of Ethiopia; 1344–1372	Succeeded by Newaya Maryam
