= Tewodros I =

Emperor of Ethiopia from 1413 to 1414

Tewodros I ቀዳማዊ ዐፄ ቴዎድሮስ

Emperor of Ethiopia
- Reign: 12 October 1413 – 23 June 1414
- Predecessor: Dawit I
- Successor: Yeshaq I
- Died: 2 July 1414
Regnal name
- Walda Anbasa
- House: House of Solomon
- Father: Dawit I
- Mother: Seyon Mangasha
- Religion: Ethiopian Orthodox Church

Tewodros I (Ge'ez: ቴዎድሮስ), throne name Walda Anbasa (Ge'ez: ወልደ ዐንበሳ; died 2 July 1414) was Emperor of Ethiopia from 1413 to 1414, and a member of the Solomonic dynasty. He was the son of Dawit I by Queen Seyon Mangasha.

== Reign ==
Despite the fact it only lasted nine months (from 12 October 1413 to 23 June 1414), Tewodros's reign acquired a connotation of being a golden age for Ethiopia. The explorer James Bruce later commented,

There must have been something very brilliant that happened under this prince, for though the reign is so short, it is before all others the most favourite epoch in Abyssinia. It is even confidently believed, that he is to rise again, and reign in Abyssinia for a thousand years, and in this period all war is to cease and everyone, in fulness, to enjoy happiness, plenty and peace.

E. A. Wallis Budge repeats the account of the Synaxarium that Emperor Tewodros was "a very religious man, and a great lover of religious literature". Budge adds that Tewodros wished to make a pilgrimage to Jerusalem, but was convinced not to make the journey by the Abuna Mark, "who feared for his safety." Despite this, Budge notes that he annulled the agreement of his ancestor Yekuno Amlak that granted a third of the country to the Ethiopian Church.

Tewodros died beyond the Awash river. Taddesse Tamrat suspects that chroniclers of this era tried to suppress the violent death of the Emperors. Tewodros supposedly fell in battle against the Adalites in Adal. He was first buried at the church of Tadbaba Maryam, but his nephew, Emperor Baeda Maryam I had his body re-interred at Atronsa Maryam.

Regnal titles
Preceded by Dawit I	Emperor of Ethiopia; 1413–1414	Succeeded by Yeshaq I
