= Salomon III of Ethiopia =

Emperor of Ethiopia intermittently between 1796 and 1799

Salomon III

Emperor of Ethiopia
- Reign: 20 May 1796 – 15 July 1797
- Predecessor: Tekle Giyorgis I
- Successor: Yonas
- Reign: 16 June – 25 July 1799
- Predecessor: Tekle Giyorgis I
- Successor: Demetros
- Dynasty: House of Solomon
- Father: Tekle Haymanot II

Salomon III (Ge'ez: ሰሎሞን) was Emperor of Ethiopia intermittently between 1796 and 1797, and a member of the Solomonic dynasty. He was the son of Tekle Haymanot II. He may be identical with the Emperor Solomon whom the traveler Henry Salt lists as one of the Emperors still alive at the time of his visit in 1809/1810. E. A. Wallis Budge notes some authorities believe he was the same person as Baeda Maryam II.

== Life ==
He was largely a figurehead, appointed Emperor by Ras Wolde Selassie of Tigray and Ras Mare'ed in 1796. He spent the next year struggling with his rival, and brother, the former Emperor Tekle Giyorgis I; while he was preoccupied with Tekle Giyorgis, Gondar was surrounded in May 1797 by the rebel Balambaras Asserat, who did not have the military strength to enter the capital city, and limited his destruction to burning the property of Tekle Giyorgis in Gondar. Salomon was forced to flee Gondar, and took refuge in Axum where he lived under the protection of Ras Wolde Selassie. The Ras then supported the restoration of Salomon's brother Tekle Giyorgis. Not long afterwards, Salomon was invited to live with his brother as his guest.

In May 1797, while Tekle Giyorgis was campaigning in Begemder, Salomon disappeared from Tekle Giyorgis' camp and made his way back to Gondar where he received by Ras Mare'ed. Ras Mare'ed and Ras Guebre then restored Salomon as Emperor the following month. However, Ras Wolde Gabriel marched on Gondar and a battle was fought between him and Ras Mare'ed on 22 July; both Wolde Gabriel and Mare'ed were killed, but Salomon's supporters were defeated. Salomon was deposed and put into chains by Dejazmach Gugsa and Dejazmach Alula, who were in the victorious army, and replaced him five days later with Demetros, the great-grandson of Emperor Fasilides. In 1802, Salomon was reportedly still a prisoner, but at that time in Tigray.

== Notes ==
Regnal titles
Preceded by Tekle Giyorgis I	Emperor of Ethiopia; 1796–1797	Succeeded by Yonas
Preceded by Tekle Giyorgis I	Emperor of Ethiopia; 1799	Succeeded by Demetros
