= Dawit I =

Emperor of Ethiopia from 1382 to 1413

Dawit I ቀዳማዊ ዐፄ ዳዊት

Emperor of Ethiopia
- Reign: 1382 – October 6, 1413
- Predecessor: Newaya Maryam
- Successor: Tewodros I
- Spouse: Seyon Mangasha 'Egzi'e Kebra
- Issue: Tewodros I Yeshaq I Takla Maryam; Zara Yaqob; Dil Mengesha
- Dynasty: House of Solomon
- Father: Newaya Krestos
- Mother: Lazzab Warqa
- Religion: Ethiopian Orthodox

Dawit I (Ge'ez: ዳዊት; throne name Qwestantinos) was Emperor of Ethiopia from 1382 until his death on October 6, 1413, and a member of the Solomonic dynasty.

A younger son of Emperor Newaya Krestos (known by his throne name Sayfa Ar'ad) and Lazzab Warqa, Dawit was never meant to ascend the throne. He took the throne from his older brother Newaya Maryam, probably with the help of his sister Dil Sefa, a move that led to conflict among the monastic clergy. There is no royal chronicle covering the years he ruled, so what is known about the period has been pieced together from hagiographies, land grants, and later liturgical and historiographical sources. Historians see Dawit's 33-year reign, which followed the territorial expansion achieved by his predecessors, as a period of consolidation for the Solomonic kingdom.

In the early years of his reign, Dawit invaded Egypt to protect the persecuted Coptic Christians of Upper Egypt under Muslim rule, but was persuaded to turn back by the Patriarch of Alexandria. In later years he remained on good terms with the Sultan's successor, Berkuk, the first Mamluk sultan of the Burji dynasty. On his eastern border, Dawit fought the Muslim sultanate of Ifat on much the same terms as his predecessors, setting up permanent royal camps at Tobya and Tilq and strengthening the garrisons at Bali, Dawaro, and Hadiya. He is said to have pursued Sultan Sa'ad al-Din of Ifat to an island near Zeila and killed him there. Older scholarship places this event in 1402/03, within Dawit's own reign, or in 1415, crediting his son and successor Yeshaq instead; more recent research using Yemeni Rasulid court records redates it to 1408/09, still within Dawit's reign.

Dawit also clashed with the Ewostathian monastic movement over Sabbath observance, imprisoning and later reconciling with its leadership, and he sponsored religious manuscripts and is credited with bringing a fragment of the True Cross to Ethiopia.

He died on 6 October 1413, reportedly after being kicked in the head by a horse. He was buried first at Zion, before his remains were later moved, eventually reaching the monastery of Daga Estifanos on Lake Tana.

== Reign ==
Dawit was one of the sons of King Newaya Krestos, whose throne name was Sayfa Ar'ad, and Lazzab Warqa. In 1372, Dawit did not become emperor, since the throne passed instead to his elder brother Newaya Maryam following the death of their father. It was around 1379/80 that Dawit took the throne and named himself Qwestantinos, with the help of his sister Dil Sefa, according to the History of the Patriarchs of the Egyptian Church. Such an unusual succession drew criticism within monastic circles, particularly at Asbo (Debre Libanos of Shewa), whose abbot was Tewodros. However, the abbot of Debre Hayq Estifanos supported Dawit and was rewarded with grants of land, along with other monasteries further to the north such as Debre Damo and Debre Halleluya.

Early in his reign, around 1380, Dawit campaigned against Egypt. He initiated this campaign in an attempt to assist the Coptic Christians of Upper Egypt who he thought were being oppressed under Muslim rule and he felt he had the duty to protect them as he saw himself as the protector of Orthodox Christianity in East Africa. In response, the Emir forced the Patriarch of Alexandria, Matthew I, to send a deputation to Dawit to persuade him to retire back to his kingdom. "There seems to be little or no doubt that, on the eve of the advent of the Burji dynasty of Mamluk Egypt, King Dawit had in fact led his troops beyond the northern frontiers of his kingdom, and created much havoc among the Muslim inhabitants of the area who had been within the sphere of influence of Egypt since the thirteenth century." The Emperor apparently had a much friendlier relationship with the Sultan's successor, for according to the medieval historian al-Maqrizi, Dawit sent 22 camels laden with gifts to Berkuk, the first Sultan of the Burji dynasty.

One of the gifts sent to the Mamluk court was an enslaved court eunuch, Jawhar al-Qunuqba'i, sent to Berkuk between 1386 and 1387; he went on to become an important treasury official in Cairo, one of the few Ethiopian-born eunuchs who reached this level of status in this period.

He dealt with raids on his eastern border by attacking the kingdoms responsible for them. Along with establishing royal encampments at Tobya, in north-western Ifat, and Tilq, in Fatagar (both places his successors would later use as royal encampments as well), Dawit stationed soldiers in Bali, Dawaro, and Hadiya against the threat posed by Adal.

Sources have differed on the date of Sultan Sa'ad ad-Din's death, the ruler responsible, and even the exact location where it took place. According to al-Maqrizi's Kitab al-Ilmam, this event occurred in 1402/03, during Dawit's reign, on an island near Zeila, whereas a separate Walasma dynastic chronicle dates it to 1415 and attributes it to Emperor Yeshaq. In 2020, Amélie Chekroun re-dated the sultan's death to 1408/09 after examining previously unstudied Rasulid Yemeni court records documenting the arrival of Sa'ad ad-Din's sons in Ta'izz shortly after his death. She also supported this conclusion with a sixteenth-century Ge'ez synaxarion that refers to the conquered territory as "the country of Dawit's Adal."

A 2011 archaeological and textual study of Zeila found no conclusive evidence that either the port of Zeila or the nearby island were besieged and sacked, and suggested that if the siege occurred, the year 1415, during Emperor Yeshaq's reign was most likely. The authors state that this would have entailed crossing all of the eastern Muslim territories up to the Gulf of Aden. They note the absence of a precise Ge'ez record, suggesting that the account may be the result of a later local elaboration. (Note: No complete critical edition or modern translation of al-Maqrīzī's Kitāb al-Ilmām incorporating all known manuscripts has been published; the text is known mainly through F.T. Rinck's 1790 Latin edition and an unpublished 1955 English translation of that Latin version by G.W.B. Huntingford. A critical edition, announced under Manfred Kropp (with Franz-Christoph Muth credited in earlier notices) for Brill's Bibliotheca Maqriziana series, remains listed as forthcoming as of 2026.) However, some liturgical antiphons composed for Dawit contain repeated references to a successful military campaign that reached the Red Sea coast; Jonas Karlsson has suggested that these possibly allude to the same victory over the Ifatite sultan at Zeila, though he notes this connection is not made explicit in the texts themselves and remains uncertain.

Dawit sent an embassy to Europe, which had reached Venice by 23 June 1402, requesting that a number of artisans are sent to his domain. Carlo Conti Rossini assembled the surviving documents concerning this visit in 1927, which record that five artisans departed with the Ethiopian envoy that August, but not if they arrived in Ethiopia. However, Marilyn E. Heldman found evidence of a "silver-gilt chalice" made in Venice, which, if it was the one Francisco Álvares described as seeing in Ethiopia, did reach Dawit. Another possible sign of their arrival is an itinerary of a journey from Venice by Rhodes, Cyprus, Jerusalem, Cairo and Axum to the court of Preste John in Shewa. which O. G. S. Crawford dates to Dawit's reign. Crawford considers this document the "first unambiguous account of Abyssinian geography which has survived; it certainly refers to the journey of a European, and the route followed can be identified pretty accurately."

Dawit was later drawn into a long-standing dispute within the Ethiopian Church about the followers of Ewostatewos, who observed both Saturday and Sunday as Sabbaths. In 1400, working with the metropolitan bishop, he sent envoys to summon their leaders and had one of them, Abba Filipos of Debre Bizen, imprisoned at Debre Hayq. In 1404, after the death of his counselor at Debre Hayq, Dawit changed his position on the advice of Giyorgis of Sagla, a priest who educated the king's children and composed some of the earliest Ethiopian anaphoras; he freed Filipos and issued a decree permitting the Saturday Sabbath to be observed in Ewostathian monasteries.

A notable horseman, Dawit was killed when his horse lashed out and kicked him in the head. Scottish traveller James Bruce stated that the mark of the horse's hit was still visible on the emperor's skull by the time he visited it. According to another tradition, ascribed to al-Maqrizi, Dawit was said to have been defeated, captured, and slain by the sultan of Adal, Mansur ad-Din, at Yedaya. This is difficult to reconcile with Dawit's death date given above, since Mansur ad-Din's reign over Adal is generally placed around 1422–1424, roughly a decade after Dawit's death in 1413. Richard Pankhurst noted that his death however, although presumed to be an event of major importance, is not recorded by the Ethiopian Chronicles. The overwhelming majority of historians such as Taddesse Tamrat, Mohammed Hassen, J. Spencer Trimingham, E.A. Wallis Budge and more, place the end of Dawit's reign at 1411-1412, a decade before the supposed battle takes place.

Dawit was said to have been buried first in "the country of Zion." His body was later moved by Zara Yaqob to the royal tomb he had founded, Debre Nagwadgwad, and was moved again several decades later to the monastery of Daga Estifanos on Lake Tana, the same place where James Bruce reported seeing the mark left by the kick.

He was succeeded by his son Tewodros I, who reigned for only around nine months instead of the three years listed in later chronologies. According to a synaxarion of the sixteenth century written in Ge'ez at the monastery of Däbrä Bizän, Tewodros died during an expedition east of the Awash River, in what it calls "the land of Dawit's Adal," and his body was transported back across the river by his troops.

== Other events ==
The Emperor Dawit was an enthusiastic Christian. He dealt with a revolt of the Beta Israel in Semien, and encouraged missionary work in Gojjam. Early in his reign, he led a campaign against Upper Egypt after hearing stories that the native Orthodox Copts were being mistreated under Muslim rule. During this campaign, his troops were forced to retreat back to their kingdom after the Sultan of Egypt made peace with Dawit. According to E. A. Wallis Budge, during Dawit's reign, a piece of the True Cross arrived in Ethiopia. The modern theory regarding the origin of the relic suggests the Coptic Patriarch Matthew I (1378–1408) as its source, though its veneration is thought to date only from the reign of Dawit's son Zara Yaqob. He also made endowments to the Ethiopian Church: three charters survive of grants he made of lands in Wolqayt, Serae, Adiyabo, Shire, Addi Arkay, northern Semien, the Gar'alta, Manbarta, and Karnesem which lies north of present-day Asmara.

Dawit's daughter, Dil Mengesha, established the large basilica church of Beta Lehem Maryam in the Gayint region around 1400. The church was distinguished by its size and by an altarpiece painting resembling the Ark of the Covenant. Another charter, preserved in a fourteenth-century gospel manuscript, records Dawit's grant of land to the church.

During Dawit's time atop the throne, two surviving examples of illustrated manuscripts were produced. One is a translation of the Miracles of Mary, which had been written in Arabic, done at the command of Emperor Dawit. This is the oldest surviving illustrated book commissioned by an Ethiopian Emperor. The other, described as "one of the most beautiful illustrated books of the period", is a copy of the gospels, which is now preserved at the monastery of Saint Gabriel on Kebran Island in southern Lake Tana.

== Notes ==
Regnal titles
Preceded by Newaya Maryam	Emperor of Ethiopia; 1382–1413	Succeeded by Tewodros I
