= Sayint =

District in Amhara Region, Ethiopia

Coordinates: 11°15′N 38°40′E

Sayint ሣይንት
- Woreda
- Flag
- Interactive map of Sayint
- Country: Ethiopia
- Region: Amhara
- Zone: South Wollo

Area
  - Total: 1,437.30 km^{2} (554.94 sq mi)

Population (2012 est.)
  - Total: 156,940

Sayint (Amharic: ሣይንት), also known as Amhara Sayint (Amharic: አማራ ሣይንት), is a district in the Amhara Region, Ethiopia. It is named after the historical district of Amhara Sayint which was located in the same area. Part of the South Wollo Zone, Sayint is bordered on the south by Debre Sina and Mehal Sayint, on the west by the Blue Nile that separates it from the East Gojjam Zone, on the northwest by the Bashilo River that separates it from the South Gondar Zone, on the north by Magdala, on the east by Tenta and on the southeast by Legambo. The major town in Amhara Sayint is Ajibar. Mehal Sayint was created by separating it from the historic Amhara Sayint woreda.

The altitude of this district ranges from 500 metres (1,600 ft) above sea level at the bottom of the canyon of the Abay to 4,247 metres (13,934 ft); the highest point in this district, as well as in the South Wollo Zone, is Mount Tabor, which lies on the border with Legambo. The Abay is crossable at Daga ford, which connects this woreda with Enbise Sar Midir in Misraq Gojjam. Notable landmarks include the monastery of Tadbaba Maryam, which was founded during the reign of emperor Minilik I. Holding the tabot of Tadbaba Mariam, Emperor Gelawdewos defeated the Imam Ahmad ibn Ibrahim in the Battle of Wayna Daga, near Dembiya woreda in Begemdir. According to Hormuzd Rassam, Tewodros II's mother, Atitegeb Wondbewossen, was a native of Amhara Sayint.

== Demographics ==
Based on the 2007 national census conducted by the Central Statistical Agency of Ethiopia (CSA), this woreda has a total population of 144,972, a decrease of 25.12% over the 1994 census, of whom 71,979 are men and 72,993 women; 5,474 or 3.78% are urban inhabitants. With an area of 1,437.30 square kilometers, Amhara Sayint has a population density of 100.86, which is less than the Zone average of 147.58 persons per square kilometer. A total of 34,999 households were counted in this woreda, resulting in an average of 4.14 persons to a household, and 33,604 housing units. The majority of the inhabitants said they practiced Orthodox Tewahedo, with 98% reporting that as their religion, while 2% of the population were Muslim.

The 1994 national census reported a total population for this woreda of 193,616 in 47,189 households, of whom 96,754 were men and 96,862 were women; 2,068 or 1.07% of its population were urban dwellers. The largest ethnic group reported in Amhara Sayint were the Amharas (99.96%). Amharic was spoken as a first language by 99.97%. The majority of the inhabitants professed Orthodox Tewahedo, with 98% of the population having reported they practiced that belief, while 2% of the population said they were Muslim.
