= Yagbe'u Seyon =

Emperor of Ethiopia from 1285 to 1294

Yagbe'u Seyon ዐፄ ይግባ ጽዮን
- King of Kings
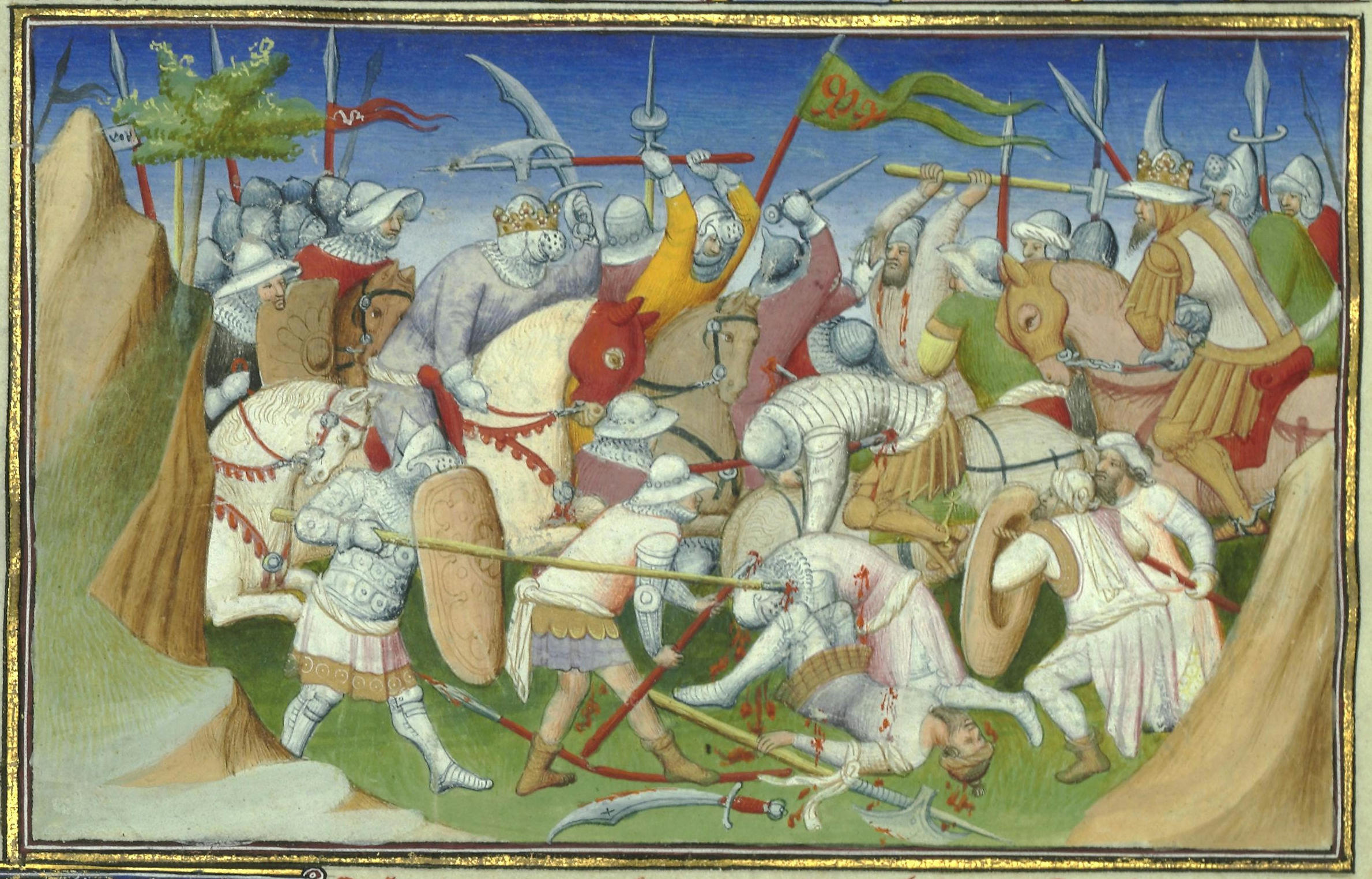
- Painting of Emperor Yagbea-Sion (left) and his troops battling a sultan and his men from Le livre des Merveilles

Emperor of Ethiopia
- Reign: 18 June 1285 – 1294
- Predecessor: Yekuno Amlak
- Successor: Senfa Ared IV
- Died: 1294
Regnal name
- Salmon
- Dynasty: House of Solomon
- Father: Yekuno Amlak
- Religion: Ethiopian Orthodox Church

Yagbe'u Seyon (Amharic: ይግባ ጽዮን, died 1294), throne name Salomon, was Emperor of Ethiopia from 18 June 1285 to 1294, and a member of the Solomonic dynasty. He succeeded his father Yekuno Amlak.

== Reign ==
Yagbe'u Seyon served as co-ruler with his father Yekuno Amlak for the last few years of his reign, which eased his succession. A Memorandum in the Four Gospels of Iyasus Mo'a of a gift of vestments and utensils to Istifanos Monastery in Lake Hayq states these gifts were in the name of both Yekuno Amlak and his son Yagbe'u Seyon. He sought to improve the relations of his kingdom with his Muslim neighbors; however, like his father, he was unsuccessful in convincing the powers in Egypt to ordain an abuna or metropolitan for the Ethiopian Orthodox Church. A letter from him to the Sultan of Egypt, dated Ramadhan A.H. 689 (towards the end of AD 1289) is mentioned in Etienne Marc Quatremère's Mémoires géographiques et historiques sur l'Égypte... sur quelques contrées voisines (Paris, 1811), where he protests the Sultan's treatment of his Christian subjects, stating that he was a protector of his own Muslim subjects.

Marco Polo mentions that one of the "princes" of Ethiopia planned in 1288 to make a pilgrimage to Jerusalem, following the practice of a number of his subjects; he was dissuaded from this project, but sent his "bishop" in his place. On his return leg, this bishop was detained by the "Sultan of Adem", who attempted to convert the ecclesiastic to Islam; failing to do so, the sultan then had the bishop circumcised before releasing him. The "prince" then marched upon Aden, and despite support from two other Muslim allies, the sultan was defeated and his capital captured. A number of historians, including Trimingham and Pankhurst, identify the ruler with Yagbe'u Seyon.

Another incident during his reign was the revolt of Yi'qebene, who attempted to take the Imperial throne from Yagbe'u Seyon. This threat is recorded in Yagbe'u's own words in a note he wrote in the Four Gospels of Iyasus Mo'a:

I, Yagba-Siyon, whose regnal name is Solomon, adorned this book of the Four Gospels and gave it to (the church of St.) Stephen. After that, there came Yi' qäbänä and he wanted to take away my throne; but I defeated him and destroyed him with the power of Christ, my God.

Historians are divided over the situation that his successors faced following Yagbe'u Seyon's death. The CIA operative Paul B. Henze repeats the tradition that Yagbe'u Seyon could not decide which of his sons should inherit his kingdom, and instructed that each would rule in turn for a year. Taddesse Tamrat, on the other hand, records that his reign was followed by dynastic confusion, during which each of his sons held the throne.

Regnal titles
| Preceded by Yekuno Amlak | Emperor of Ethiopia; 1285–1294 | Succeeded by Senfa Ared IV |
