= Bulga (Ethiopia) =

Historical province in central Ethiopia

Bulga (Amharic: ቡልጋ) is a historical region of Ethiopia in the central part of Shewa. It was bounded by the Germama river to the south, which formed the historical boundary between it and Minjar in the south. It presently encompasses the modern woredas of Hagere Mariamna Kesem, Asagirt, and Berehet.

== History ==
According to religious tradition and hagiographies, the area known as Bulga had historically been inhabited by Christians since Axumite times, where Christian Amhara families had migrated there from the north around the time of the decline of Axum. Amongst these was the family of the widely revered Saint Tekle Haymanot, who was born in the district of Zorare, in Silalish, an ancient name for Bulga in 1215 and where he first launched his first evangelisations.

While Silalish seems to have been the name for the southern part of Bulga, Sarmat is thought to have the ancient name of the northern and central parts. Around the time of Tekle Haymanot in the 13th century, the area according to his hagiography had been under the control of Damot and its ruler Motolemi. Soon however it became one firmly under the control of the Christian Kingdom and was appointed regional bishops by Abba Filipos, Echege of Debre Libanos becoming one of the earliest traditional Christian localities of central Ethiopia. The region of Fetegar, (modern Menjarna Shenkora) was bordered by it in the south, although according to Johann Ludwig Krapf, Bulga was considered a part of Fetegar by 1842

After the Islamic invasions led by Ahmad ibn Ibrahim al-Ghazi in the 16th century and the subsequent Oromo migrations that followed Bulga, like the rest of Shewa was invaded and conquered by the Oromos, who settled there as newcomers, forcing its inhabitants to live in gorges and becoming isolated from the rest of the Ethiopian Kingdom, which by then had relocated its base to the Lake Tana region in Gonder. It was not until Meridazmach Amha Iyasus had reconquered Bulga from the Kereyu Oromos in the mid 18th century that it incorporated with the rest of the historical Amhara regions of Shewa along with Merhabete, Angolala, Tegulet and others. By the 20th century, Emperor Haile Selassie had incorporated Bulga with the historical region of Tegulet to create the woreda known as Tegulet ena Bulga, and in 1993, the EPDRF divided it into the Hagere Mariamna Kesem, Asagirt, and Berehet woredas.

== Notable individuals ==
- St. Tekle Haymanot, monk and patron saint of Ethiopia
- Emperor Fasilidas, Emperor of Ethiopia from 1632 to 1667
- St. Kristos Samra, Ethiopian Orthodox saint
- Tesfa Gebreselassie (Ze-Biher Bulga), writer
- Tekle-Tsadik Mekuria, notable historian and author
- Aklilu Habte-Wold, Prime Minister from 1961 to 1974
