= Angolalla Terana Asagirt =

Coordinates: 9°40′N 39°20′E

Angolalla Terana Asagirt was one of the 105 woredas in the Amhara Region of Ethiopia. It is named in part after one of the capitals of the former principality of Shewa, Angolalla. Located at the eastern edge of the Ethiopian Highlands in the Semien Shewa Zone, Angolalla Terana Asagirt was bordered on the southwest by Hagere Mariamna Kesem, on the west by the Oromia Region, on the north by Basona Werana, on the northeast by Ankober, and on the southeast by Berehet. Angolalla Terana Asagirt was divided for Angolalla Tera and Asagirt woredas.

The administrative center of this woreda was Chacha; other towns in Angolalla Terana Asagirt included Choki and Gina Ager. Elevations in this woreda range from 1000 to 2100 meters above sea level. The highest point in Angolalla Terana Asagirt is Mount Megezez.

== Demographics ==
Based on figures published by the Central Statistical Agency in 2005, this woreda has an estimated total population of 120,283, of whom 60,288 are men and 59,995 are women; 7,308 or 6.08% of its population are urban dwellers, which is less than the Zone average of 11.8%. With an estimated area of 992.35 square kilometers, Angolalla Terana Asagirt has an estimated population density of 121.2 people per square kilometer, which is less than the Zone average of 134.37.

The 1994 national census reported a total population for this woreda of 88,117 in 17,091 households, of whom 44,375 were men and 43,744 were women; 4,220 or 4.79% of its population were urban dwellers. The two largest ethnic groups reported in Angolalla Terana Asagirt were the Amhara (80.61%), and the Oromo (18.33%); all other ethnic groups made up 1.06% of the population. Amharic was spoken as a first language by 80.92%, and Oromiffa was spoken by 19.02%; the remaining 0.08% spoke all other primary languages reported. The majority of the inhabitants practiced Ethiopian Orthodox Christianity, with 98.43% reporting that as their religion, while 1.5% were Muslim.
