= Verzeri =

Verzeri is a surname. Notable people with the surname include:

- Ignazia Verzeri (1801–1852), Italian Benedictine nun
- Juan Verzeri (born 1963), Uruguayan football manager
