= Minjarna Shenkora =

District in Amhara Region, Ethiopia

Coordinates: 9°10′N 39°20′E

Minjarna Shenkora ምንጃርና ሸንኮራ
- Woreda
- Flag
- Interactive map of Minjarna Shenkora
- Zone: Semien Shewa
- Region: Amhara

Area
  - Total: 1,509.93 km^{2} (582.99 sq mi)

Population (2012 est.)
  - Total: 140,639
  - Density: 93.1427/km^{2} (241.239/sq mi)

Minjarna Shenkora (Amharic: ምንጃርና ሸንኮራ, lit. 'Minjar and Shenkora'), also Menjarna Shenkora is a woreda in the Amhara Region, Ethiopia. It is named in part after the historic Shewan district of Minjar, which was the southernmost district of Shewa and near the location of the modern woreda. Located at the southern end of the Semien Shewa Zone, Minjarna Shenkora is bordered on the east, south and west by the Oromia Region, on the northwest by Hagere Mariamna Kesem, and on the northeast by Berehet; the Germama (or Kesem) river forms the boundary between this woreda and Hagere Mariamna Kesem and Berehet. The administrative center of this woreda is Arerti; other towns in the woreda include Balchi and Eranbuti.

This woreda is served by the Addis Ababa - Djibouti Railway with a station at Malka Jilo. It is the only woreda in the Amhara Region with a train station.

== Demographics ==
A 2012 estimate puts the population at 140,639. This gives a population density of 93.14 people per square kilometer (241.24 people per square mile), given its area of 1509.93 square kilometers (582.99 square miles), lower than the North Shewa Zone average of 126.20 people per square kilometer (326.87 people per square mile).

Based on the 2007 national census conducted by the Central Statistical Agency of Ethiopia (CSA), this woreda has a total population of 128,879, an increase of 29.65% over the 1994 census, of whom 66,918 are men and 61,961 women; 12,237 or 9.49% are urban inhabitants. With an area of 1,509.93 square kilometers, Menjarna Shenkora has a population density of 85.35, which is less than the Zone average of 115.3 persons per square kilometer. A total of 29,359 households were counted in this woreda, resulting in an average of 4.39 persons to a household, and 28,221 housing units. The 1994 national census reported a total population for this woreda of 99,402 in 17,787 households, of whom 51,537 were men and 47,865 were women; 8,378 or 8.43% of its population were urban dwellers.

The three largest ethnic groups reported in Menjarna Shenkora were the Amhara (93.78%), the Oromo (3.11%), and the Argobba (2.65%); all other ethnic groups made up 0.46% of the population. Amharic was spoken as a first language by 96.93%, and Oromiffa was spoken by 2.76%; the remaining 0.31% spoke all other primary languages reported. The majority of the inhabitants practiced Ethiopian Orthodox Christianity, with 94.74% reporting that as their religion, while 5.15% were Muslim. By 2007 That had remained largely the same, with 94% reporting Ethiopian Orthodox Christianity as their religion, while 5.73% of the population said they were Muslim.
