= Debre Birhan =

City in Amhara Region, Ethiopia

Debre Berhan ደብረ ብርሃን
- City
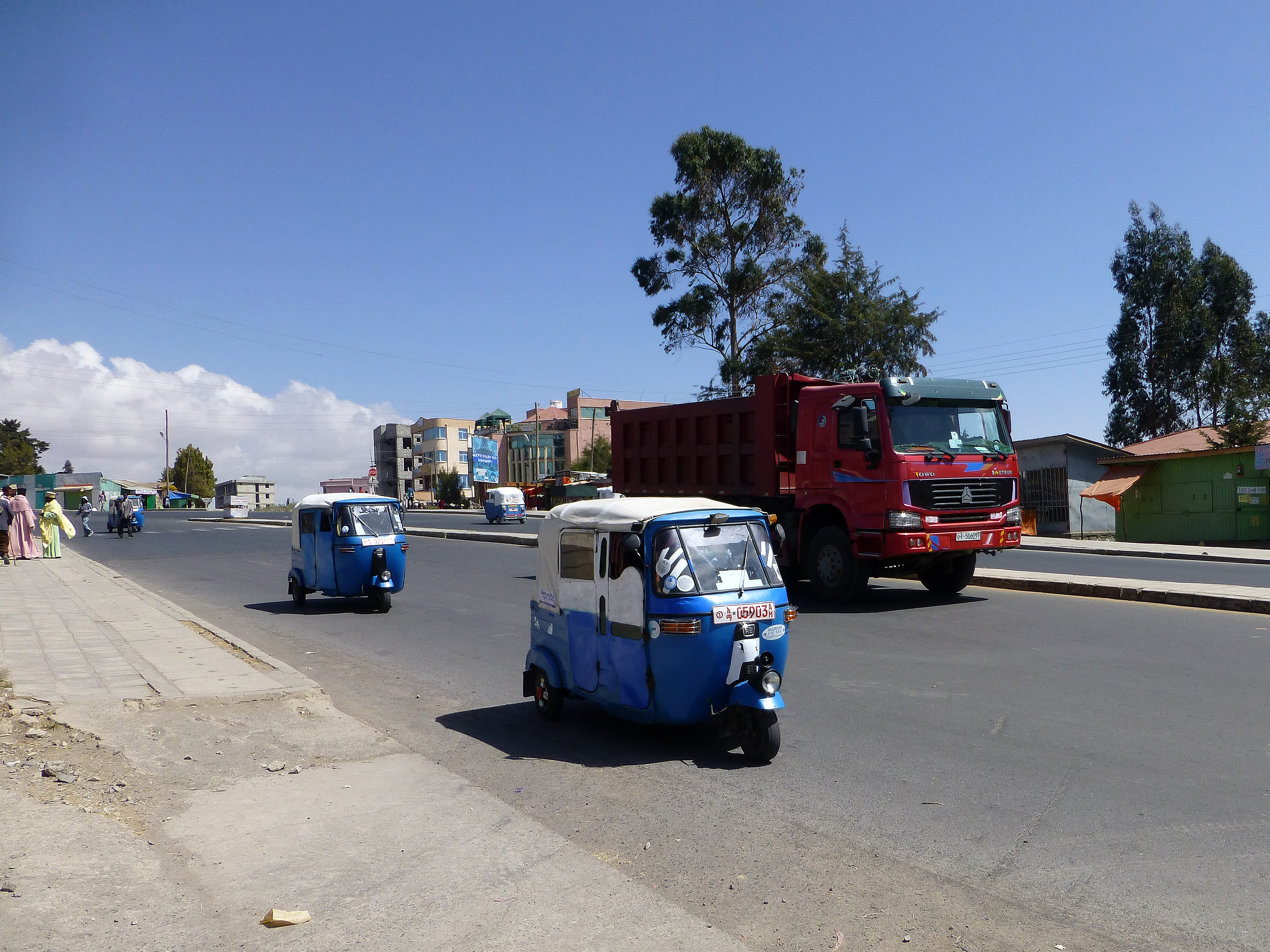
- A street in Debre Berhan

- Location within Ethiopia
- Coordinates: 9°41′N 39°32′E
- Country: Ethiopia
- Region: Amhara
- Zone: North Shewa
- Founded: 7 March 1456
- Founder: Zara Yaqob

Area
  - Total: 124 km^{2} (48 sq mi)
- Elevation: 2,840 m (9,320 ft)

Population (2026)
  - Total: 436,711
  - Estimate (2026): 436,711
  - Density: 3,520/km^{2} (9,120/sq mi)
- Time zone: UTC+3 (EAT)

Debre Berhan (Amharic: ደብረ ብርሃን) is a city in north central Ethiopia. Located in the Semien Shewa Zone of Amhara Region, about 130 kilometers north east of Addis Ababa on Ethiopian highway 2, the town has an elevation of 2,840 meters, which makes it the highest town in Africa. It was an early capital of Ethiopia and afterwards, with Ankober and Angolalla, was one of the capitals of the kingdom of Shewa. Today, it is the administrative center of the North Shewa Zone of the Amhara Region.

== History ==
=== Origins ===
Debre Birhan was founded by Emperor Zara Yaqob, in response to a miraculous light that was seen in the sky at the time. Believing this was a sign from God showing his approval for the death by stoning of a group of heretics 38 days before, the emperor ordered a church built on the site, and later constructed an extensive palace nearby, and a second church, dedicated to Saint Cyriacus. Zara Yaqob spent 12 of the last 14 years of his life in Debre Birhan.

Historian Richard Pankhurst offers the date of 1456 for the date of the founding of this church, providing a plausible argument that the light in the sky was Halley's Comet, which could have been seen in Shewa that year, although the traditional dates (10th day of the month of Maggabit, i.e. 6 or 7 March) do not coincide with the days that the comet was most visible (13 through 17 June).

While his son Baeda Maryam did spend the first part of his reign in Debre Birhan, eventually Baeda Maryam returned to the established itinerant practice of living in a permanent encampment that was constantly on the move through the realm. The departure of the court led to a decline in the population and importance of this town. Pankhurst explains that the needs of the imperial court and army—who numbered in the thousands—for firewood and food was so burdensome that, "it could not remain in any one locality for more than four months, nor return to the same place in less than 10 years due to the resultant shortage of food", which prevented the growth of any capital city in this period.

=== 16th-18th century ===
While little more than a large village, Debre Birhan is mentioned a few times in the 16th century, the first time as a mustering center by Emperor Lebna Dengel against the invading armies of Ahmad ibn Ibrahim. After he had defeated Lebna Dengel at the Battle of Amba Sel, Ahmad mustered his troops twice in Debre Birhan before leading them on campaigns deeper into Ethiopian territory. At the second mustering in 1535, he proclaimed before his followers, "Thanks be to God, Abyssinia is conquered. Only Tigray, Begemder and Gojjam are left... Shall we march against them, or shall we stay on in this region for a year until we have settled it down?" then led them into the Ethiopian Highlands.

=== 19th century ===
The village regained importance in the reign of Asfaw Wossen (1775–1808), Meridazmach of Shewa, who built a palace there, and divided his time amongst this town, Ankober and Angolalla. The succeeding Meridazmaches prized Debre Birhan as a hunting lodge for its surrounding plains, and used it as a riding place. His son Sahle Selassie rebuilt Debre Birhan after it had been ravaged by Abichu Oromo at the beginning of his reign, and built a church dedicated to the Selassie ("Trinity") in this capital.

When then Negus Menelik submitted to Emperor Yohannes IV in the treaty of Wadara of 1878, it was also stipulated that the capital of Shewa would be moved from Liche to Debre Birhan.

The Debre Birhan market in the 1880s was considered important for mules and horses. The Selassie church was rebuilt by Emperor Menilek in 1906 and contains many mural paintings. David Buxton believes that it was inevitable that Debre Berhan would regain importance, "Although a somewhat cold and inhospitable place," he writes about the town, "it has an obvious advantage as commanding what must always have been an important focus of routes. Even in modern times it was inevitable that the Asmara road should be brought through this easy passage, avoiding the impassable gorges on the other."

=== 20th century ===
Debre Berhan received electricity in 1955 when a 90 kW hydro-electric power station was put into service; by 1965, the installed electrical capacity in the town was 125 kVA and annual production 103,000 kWh. On 26 April 1957, Emperor Haile Selassie opened the Community Teacher Training School in the town. By 1958 it was one of 27 places in Ethiopia ranked as First Class Township.

On 2 July 1994 it was broadcast that nine people were killed and eleven captured in an exchange of fire with security forces in Asagirt woreda. The people were alleged to have broken into the Debre Berhan prison before that, setting a number of prisoners free. According to the police, Andale Melaklu, the Debre Berhan representative of the All-Amhara People's Organization was one of the "bandits" killed in the fire exchange.

== Demographics ==
Based on the 2007 national census conducted by the Central Statistical Agency of Ethiopia (CSA), this town has a total population of 65,231, of whom 31,668 are men and 33,563 women. The majority of the inhabitants practiced Ethiopian Orthodox Christianity, with 94.12% reporting that as their religion, while 3.32% of the population said they were Muslim and 2.15% were Protestants.

The 1994 national census reported a total population for Debre Birhan of 38,717 in 8,906 households, of whom 17,918 were men and 20,799 were women. The five largest ethnic groups reported in the town were the Amhara (90.12%), the Oromo (3.94%), the Tigrayan (1.81%), the Gurage (1.60%), and the Argobba (1.20%); all other ethnic groups made up 1.33% of the population. Amharic was spoken as a first language by 93.81%, Oromiffa was spoken by 3.04%, and 1.50% spoke Tigrinya; the remaining 1.65% spoke all other primary languages reported. The majority of the inhabitants practised Ethiopian Orthodox Christianity, with 94.59% reporting that as their religion, while 4.05% were Muslim, and 1.02% reported as Protestant.

== Climate ==
Debre Birhan is one of the coolest cities found in the subtropical zone of Ethiopia. The city has a typical subtropical highland climate (Köppen Cwb). The average annual temperature of the city during day and night hour is 20.7 °C and 8.2 °C respectively with precipitation 964mm.

Climate data for Debre Birhan, elevation 2,820 m (9,250 ft)
Month	Jan	Feb	Mar	Apr	May	Jun	Jul	Aug	Sep	Oct	Nov	Dec	Year
Mean daily maximum °C (°F)	19.3 (66.7)	19.3 (66.7)	20.7 (69.3)	21.8 (71.2)	23.3 (73.9)	23.2 (73.8)	19.6 (67.3)	20.2 (68.4)	20.7 (69.3)	19.2 (66.6)	18.7 (65.7)	18.7 (65.7)	20.4 (68.7)
Daily mean °C (°F)	12.1 (53.8)	13.1 (55.6)	14.3 (57.7)	15.3 (59.5)	17.0 (62.6)	16.8 (62.2)	14.5 (58.1)	15.6 (60.1)	15.3 (59.5)	13.3 (55.9)	13.1 (55.6)	11.8 (53.2)	14.4 (57.8)
Mean daily minimum °C (°F)	5.0 (41.0)	6.9 (44.4)	8.0 (46.4)	8.8 (47.8)	10.6 (51.1)	10.6 (51.1)	9.3 (48.7)	11.1 (52.0)	9.8 (49.6)	7.4 (45.3)	7.3 (45.1)	5.0 (41.0)	8.3 (47.0)
Average precipitation mm (inches)	6 (0.2)	18 (0.7)	55 (2.2)	43 (1.7)	34 (1.3)	68 (2.7)	320 (12.6)	293 (11.5)	98 (3.9)	28 (1.1)	13 (0.5)	4 (0.2)	980 (38.6)
Source: FAO

== Local economy ==
Debre Birhan is located along Ethiopian Highway 2, which connects Addis Abeba with the north of the country. The gravel road between Debre Birhan and Ankober, 42 kilometers in length, was overhauled in May 2009.

The Debre Birhan Wool Factory, the first wool factory in Ethiopia, started production was 1 January 1965 with 120 spindles and 6 looms, having the capacity to process one metric ton of wool daily. In its first six months, the factory produced 7,065 blankets in a single-shift operation with a labor force of about 200, of whom 45% were women. The Derg government announced 3 February 1975 that the Debre Birhan Wool Factory was among 14 textile enterprises to be fully nationalised.

Debre Birhan is also a famed center of rug making.

== Education ==
Debre Berhan University is located in Debre Berhan city. Amhara Region, Ethiopia. It is one of thirteen new universities which were established in 2007 by the Ethiopian government.

== Landmarks ==
Despite its historical importance, none of the buildings Emperor Zara Yaqob built exist today due to the fact that the sixteenth century Adal leader Ahmed ibn Ibrahim al-Ghazi ordered their destruction, and no obvious 19th century construction is visible. The present church, although located on the site of the 15th century church, was built in 1906 at the orders of Emperor Menelik II.

== International relations ==
Debre Birhan is twinned with (sister city of)

- Le Blanc-Mesnil in France
