= Amha Iyasus =

Ethiopia noble (r. circa 1744–1775)

Amha Iyasus Kidane Kale, better known as Ammehayes (reigned c. 1744 – c. 1775), was a Meridazmach of Shewa, an important Amhara noble of Ethiopia. He was the son of Kidane Kale, and a sister of Goshu of Amhara.

The Meridazmach made a diplomatic visit to the Emperor's court at Gondar in 1771, during the first decades of the chaotic Zemene Mesafint ("Era of The Princes"), where the Scots explorer James Bruce met him. Calling him "Yasous", Bruce describes Amha Iyasus as "the son of the governor of Shoa", "a man from twenty-six to twenty-eight years of age, tall, and of a just degree of corpulence, with arms and legs finely made; he had a very beautiful face, small features, and the most affable manners."

== Reign ==
The reign of Amha Iyasus was long and prosperous. New lands were conquered, new settlements founded, new churches built. Mordechai Abir writes, "It was during the reign of Ammehayes that the reconquest of the territories held by the Galla really seriously began." He imported a number of firearms from the northern parts of Ethiopia, and used them to assert his primacy over his neighboring Christian states including Tegulet, Menz, Efrata and Bulga. He moved his capital to Doqaqit in Ifat, whence he raided the lands of the Afar to the east. He renewed the war with the Karayu Oromo, but had more success with the Abichu Oromo, conquering their tribes as far west as the Chia Chia river near Angolalla. According to British travelor James Bruce, Amha was also in conflict with the leaders of the Harar Emirate.

Amha Iyasus was the creator of the policy, followed by the rulers of Shewa into the middle of the next century, of avoiding being drawn into the struggles around control of the Imperial throne. An important part of this policy was leaving the district of Wollo between the Geshen and Samba Rivers untouched as buffer between Shewa and the territories of Ethiopia controlled from Gondar.

Abir notes that upon his arrival at Gondar, he was received "more like an honoured ally than a vassal" by the then 17-year-old Emperor Takla Haymanot II. According to Bruce, the Meridazmach led a thousand horsemen in support of the Emperor Tekle Haymanot in the Three battles of Sarbakusa.

=== Legacy ===
When Amha Iyasus died, he left his son Asfaw Wossen what had by then become the vast principality of a new Shewa.

== Notes ==
Preceded by Qedami Qal	Rulers of Shewa	Succeeded by Asfaw Wossen
