= Asfaw Wossen (ruler of Shewa) =

Ethiopian noble; ruler of Shewa (c. 1770 to 1808)

- Merid Azmach

Ruler of Shewa
- Reign: c. 1770 – c. 1808
- Predecessor: Amha Iyasus
- Successor: Wossen Seged
- Burial: Ankober, Amhara Region, Ethiopia
- Father: Amha Iyasus

Asfa Wossen (Amharic: አስፋ ወሰን, Amharic pronunciation: [wɔsːən]) was a ruler of Shewa of the Ethiopian Empire from about 1770 to 1808, an important Amhara noble of Ethiopia. He was the son of Amha Iyasus; Mordechai Abir notes that he was one of Amha Iyasus' 48 offspring.

== Reign ==
According to Donald Levine, Asfa Wossen spent his youth in a monastery in Menz, where he became proficient at the traditional Amharic poetic genre known as qene.

During his reign, Shewan control over the tributary states of Geshe, Antzioka, Efrata, Moret and Marra Biete were strengthened. One step in this process led Asfa Wossen to follow the advice of his father confessor and embrace the doctrine of the Sost Lidet in order to absorb the key state of Marra Biete.

Abir considers Asfa Wossen "more of an administrator than a war leader", noting the Meridazmach's administrative innovations of Shewa. "However, when the need arose, Asfa Wossen proved himself to be as brave and talented a warrior as he was a good administrator." Levine concurs in this assessment: "As a ruler he resembled many of Gondar's monarchs, preferring to spend his time in religious pursuits and the embellishment of his capital (Ankobar) than on the warpath." Once he secured his control over the Christian parts of Shewa, Asfa Wossen campaigned viciously against the Oromo of the plains of Shewa, the Tulama Oromo, the Mogar Oromo, the Abichu who dwelled at the headwaters of the Awash River, and the Oromo tribes living in the mountains of Garra Korfu.

According to Henze, some of Asfa Wossen's administrative measures included tax reforms, and placing a personal representative in each district. Henze quotes the opinion of a contemporary chronicler, who wrote that "under Asfa Wossen a small group of five or six Amhara could travel without danger from Bulga to Debre Libanos, taking the shortest route through the Galla [Oromo] area." Levine explains this benevolence was the result of "a monkish prophecy that his life would be short"; but by emptying the state coffers "he lived to fill them time and again."

About the time Asfa Wossen had made some progress in consolidating his hold on Shewa, the Imperial power at Gondar cast its shadow across Shewa. The army of Emperor Tekle Giyorgis I defeated the Oromo of Wuchale in 1784, and were encamped on the banks of the Bashilo, poised to cross into Shewa. According to the Royal Chronicles only the refusal of the Emperor's troops kept him from advancing and the Emperor Tekle Giyorgis "hardening his heart destroyed the gates of the monasteries and broke the spears and their swords and marched to the frontiers of Shewa." According to Mordechai Abir, mutual friends (and the pressure of his general Wolde Selassie upon the Emperor) made peace between the two. Donald Levine adds that Asfa Wossen "handled the situation with characteristic Shoan adroitness": on the one hand he argued that if he extended his domains it was the expense of their common enemy, the Oromo; on the other, he "heaped gifts upon the emperor and his lieutenants". Meridazmach Asfa Wossen paid tribute to the Emperor, who then returned to Gondar; this was the last time an Emperor exacted tribute from Shewa until the reign of Tewodros II.

In his last years Asfa Wossen lost his sight, and underwent a period of suffering. Following his death, his body was buried in his capital of Ankober.

== Notes ==
Preceded by Amha Iyasus	Rulers of Shewa	Succeeded by Wossen Seged
