= Asagirt =

Asagirt አሳግርት
- Woreda
- Flag
- Zone: Semien Shewa
- Region: Amhara Region

Area
  - Total: 500.31 km^{2} (193.17 sq mi)

Population (2012 est.)
  - Total: 52,281
  - Density: 104.50/km^{2} (270.65/sq mi)

Asagirt (Amharic: አሳግርት) is one of the woredas in the Amhara Region of Ethiopia. Located at the eastern edge of the Ethiopian Highlands in the Semien Shewa Zone, Asagirt is bordered on the southwest by Hagere Mariamna Kesem, on the northwest by Angolalla Tera, on the north by Basona Werana, on the northeast by Ankober, on the east by the Afar Region, and on the southeast by Berehet. The administrative center of this woreda is Gina Ager. Asagirt was part of former Angolalla Terana Asagirt woreda.

== Demographics ==
A 2012 estimate puts the population at 52,281. This gives a population density of 104.50 people per square kilometer (270.65 people per square mile), given its area of 500.31 square kilometers (193.17 square miles), lower than the North Shewa Zone average of 126.20 people per square kilometer (326.87 people per square mile).

Based on the 2007 national census conducted by the Central Statistical Agency of Ethiopia (CSA), this woreda has a total population of 48,371, of whom 24,674 are men and 23,697 women; 1,278 or 2.64% are urban inhabitants.

The majority of the inhabitants practiced Ethiopian Orthodox Christianity, with 94.92% reporting that as their religion, while 5.01% of the population said they were Muslim.
