= Debre Birhan University =

Public university in Debre Birhan, Amhara Region, Ethiopia

- Type: Public
- Established: 2007
- President: Nigussu Tadesse
- Academic staff: 524
- Total staff: 1,286
- Students: 5,387
- Location: Debre Birhan, Amhara Region, Ethiopia; 09°39′26″N 39°31′17″E
- Language: English
- Website: www.dbu.edu.et
- Location in Ethiopia

Debre Birhan University (DBU) is a public university in the city Debre Birhan, Amhara Region, Ethiopia. It is one of thirteen new universities which were established in 2007 by the Ethiopian government.

== History ==
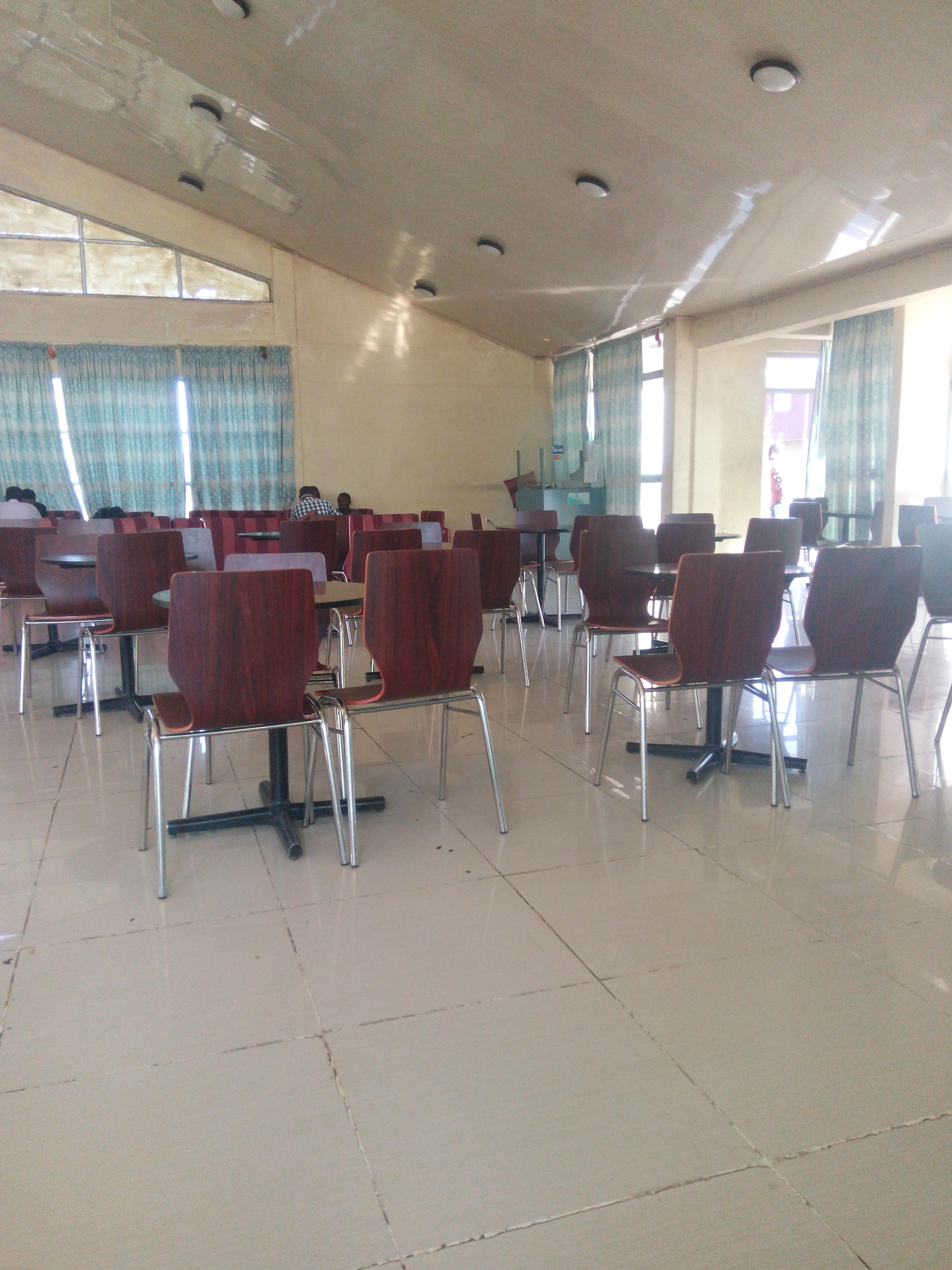
Lounge in staff of Debre Birhan University

The foundation of the university was laid down in May 2005 and the building of the first phase was started in May 2006. Instruction began in January 2007 with the enrolment of 725 students in the Faculty of Education with two streams, namely Businesses Education and Natural Science teaching. In the academic year of 2007/8, three additional Faculties (Business and Economics, Health Science and Agriculture) were opened, and the enrolment reached 2483. Furthermore, the university broadened its program and enrolled 393 summer/students and 500 Extension/evening students in 2006 and 2007 respectively. After three more construction phases, in 2012 there were about 10,000 students at the university.

== See also ==
- List of universities and colleges in Ethiopia
- Education in Ethiopia
