= Berehet =

Coordinates: 9°20′N 39°30′E

Berehet በረኸት
- Woreda
- Flag
- Interactive map of Berehet
- Zone: Semien Shewa
- Region: Amhara Region

Area
  - Total: 791.44 km^{2} (305.58 sq mi)

Population (2012 est.)
  - Total: 38,089
  - Density: 48.13/km^{2} (124.65/sq mi)

Berehet (Amharic: በረኸት) is one of the woredas in the Amhara Region of Ethiopia. Part of the Semien Shewa Zone, Berehet is bordered on the south by the Germama River which separates it from Menjarna Shenkora, on the west by Hagere Mariamna Kesem, on the north by Asagirt, and on the east by the Afar Region. The major town in Berehet is Metiteh Bila.

Berehet is the location of the Battle of Bereket, fought 19 November 1855. In this battle, the last Shewan nobles to resist Emperor Tewodros II were defeated by his general Ras Ingida, and seeing that further defiance was futile they surrendered the young heir to the Shewan throne, Menelik. Also during 1933 there was a battle between patriots and Italian army near Metiteh Bila; finally they were bombed. That area was prohibited from farming activity for a long time, and finally a memorial was built in 2013.

== Demographics ==
A 2012 estimate puts the population at 38,089. This gives a population density of 48.13 people per square kilometer (124.65 people per square mile), given its area of 791.44 square kilometers (305.58 square miles), less than half the North Shewa Zone average of 126.20 people per square kilometer (326.87 people per square mile).

Based on the 2007 national census conducted by the Central Statistical Agency of Ethiopia (CSA), this woreda has a total population of 34,810, an increase of 13.07% over the 1994 census, of whom 17,669 are men and 17,141 women; 3,978 or 11.43% are urban inhabitants. With an area of 791.44 square kilometers, Berehet has a population density of 43.98 people per square kilometer (398.35 people per square mile), which is less than the Zone average of 115.3 people per square kilometer (298.63 people per square mile). A total of 7,658 households were counted in this woreda, resulting in an average of 4.55 persons to a household, and 7,221 housing units. The 1994 national census reported a total population for this woreda of 30,786 in 5,741 households, of whom 15,789 were men and 14,997 were women; 1,328 or 4.31% of its population were urban dwellers.

The two largest ethnic groups reported in 1994 in Berehet were the Amhara (80.26%), and the Argobba (19.47%); all other ethnic groups made up 0.27% of the population. Amharic was spoken as a first language by 99.75%. The majority of the inhabitants practiced Ethiopian Orthodox Christianity, with 79.21% reporting that as their religion, while 20.75% were Muslim. By 2007 this was nearly identical, with 79.62% reporting Ethiopian Orthodox Christianity as their religion, while 20.19% of the population said they were Muslim.
