= Ankober (woreda) =

Coordinates: 9°45′N 39°40′E

Ankober አንኮበር
- Woreda
- Interactive map of Ankober
- Country: Ethiopia
- Region: Amhara
- Zone: North Shewa

Area
  - Total: 672.80 km^{2} (259.77 sq mi)

Population (2012 est.)
  - Total: 59,810
  - Density: 88.90/km^{2} (230.24/sq mi)

Ankober (Amharic: አንኮበር) is a woreda in the Amhara Region of Ethiopia. Located at the eastern edge of the Ethiopian Highlands in the North Shewa Zone, Ankober is bordered on the south by Asagirt, on the west by Basona Werana, on the north by Termaber, and on the east by the Afar Region. Towns in Ankober include Aliyu Amba, Ankober, Gorgo and Haramba.

Roads in this Ankober include one built in June 1985 to link the village of Dinki with the rest of the woreda, as part of a "Food-for-Work" program to help victims of the 1984–1985 famine. Until the road was completed, Dinki could only be reached by a two-day mule ride from Debre Berhan down steep mountain slopes. Three years after the road had been completed, two water mills had been established at the village, as well as new fruit plantations and the traditional cotton spinning and weaving industry had been revived.

== Demographics ==
A 2012 estimate puts the population at 59,810. This gives a population density of 88.90 people per square kilometer (230.24 people per square mile), given its area of 672.80 square kilometers (259.77 square miles), lower than the North Shewa Zone average of 126.20 people per square kilometer (326.87 people per square mile).

Based on the 2007 national census conducted by the Central Statistical Agency of Ethiopia (CSA), this woreda has a total population of 76,510, an increase of 14.09% over the 1994 census, of whom 38,790 are men and 37,720 women; 4,403 or 5.75% are urban inhabitants. With an area of 672.80 square kilometers, Ankober has a population density of 113.72 people per square kilometer (294.53 people per square mile), which is less than the Zone average of 115.3 people per square kilometer (298.63 people per square mile). A total of 18,274 households were counted in this woreda, resulting in an average of 4.19 persons to a household, and 17,633 housing units. The 1994 national census reported a total population for this woreda of 67,061 in 14,430 households, of whom 33,491 were men and 33,570 were women; 3,802 or 5.67% of its population were urban dwellers.

The two largest ethnic groups reported in 1994 in Ankober were the Amhara (92.77%), and the Argobba (7.04%); all other ethnic groups made up 0.19% of the population. Amharic was spoken as a first language by 98.94%, and Argobba was spoken by 0.9%; the remaining 0.16% spoke all other primary languages reported. The majority of the inhabitants practiced Ethiopian Orthodox Christianity, with 92.52% reporting that as their religion, while 7.41% were Muslim. This had changed little by 2007, with 92.73% reporting Ethiopian Orthodox Christianity as their religion, while 7.15% of the population said they were Muslim.
