= Basona Werana =

District in Amhara Region, Ethiopia

Coordinates: 9°50′N 39°20′E

Debre Berhan Zuria ደብረ ብርሃን ዙሪያ
- Woreda
- Flag
- Interactive map of Debre Berhan Zuria
- Zone: Semien Shewa
- Region: Amhara Region

Area
  - Total: 1,208.17 km^{2} (466.48 sq mi)

Population (2012 est.)
  - Total: 130,403
  - Density: 107.93/km^{2} (279.55/sq mi)

Debre Berhan Zuria or Basona Werana ("Baso and Werana"; Amharic: ደብረ ብርሃን ዙሪያ) is a woreda in the Amhara Region of Ethiopia. Located at the eastern edge of the Ethiopian Highlands in the Semien Shewa Zone, Basona Werana is bordered on the south by Angolalla Tera, on the southwest by the Oromia Region, on the west by Siyadebrina Wayu, on the northwest by Moretna Jiru, on the north by Mojana Wadera, on the northeast by Termaber, and on the east by Ankober. The town and woreda of Debre Berhan is an enclave inside this woreda. Towns in this woreda include Gudoberet.

This woreda was originally named Debre Berhan Zuria ("Greater Debre Berhan"), the name used in the 1994 national census, but it was changed before the Ethiopian Agricultural Sample Survey in October 2001, which used the present name.

The Battle of Segale was fought on 27 October 1916 in this woreda. In this battle, the supporters of Lij Iyasu of Ethiopia were defeated, which secured the outcome of the palace coup the previous month, in which Zewditu had been proclaimed Empress.

== Demographics ==
A 2012 estimate puts the population at 130,403. This gives a population density of 107.93 people per square kilometer (279.55 people per square mile), given its area of 1208.17 square kilometers (466.48 square miles), lower than the North Shewa Zone average of 126.20 people per square kilometer (326.87 people per square mile).

Based on the 2007 national census conducted by the Central Statistical Agency of Ethiopia (CSA), this woreda has a total population of 120,930, an increase of 7.81% over the 1994 census, of whom 61,924 are men and 59,006 women; 1,219 or 1.01% are urban inhabitants. With an area of 1,208.17 square kilometers, Basona Werana has a population density of 100.09 people per square kilometer (259.24 people per square mile), which is less than the Zone average of 115.3 people per square kilometer (298.63 people per square mile). A total of 27,753 households were counted in this woreda, resulting in an average of 4.36 persons to a household, and 26,918 housing units.The 1994 national census reported a total population for this woreda of 112,173 in 24,307 households, of whom 56,868 were men and 55,305 were women; the census reported no urban dwellers.

The largest ethnic group reported in Basona Werana in 1994 was the Amhara (99.46%), and Amharic was spoken as a first language by 99.33%. The majority of the inhabitants practiced Ethiopian Orthodox Christianity, with 99.96% reporting that as their religion. In 2007 this was approximately identical, with 99.93% reporting that as their religion.
