= Hagere Mariamna Kesem =

District in Amhara Region, Ethiopia

Coordinates: 9°20′N 39°15′E

Hagere Mariamna Kesem ሀገረ ማርያም ከሰም
- Woreda
- Flag
- Interactive map of Hagere Mariamna Kesem
- Zone: Semien Shewa
- Region: Amhara

Area
  - Total: 1,509.93 km^{2} (582.99 sq mi)

Population (2012 est.)
  - Total: 59,810
  - Density: 39.61/km^{2} (102.59/sq mi)

Hagere Mariamna Kesem (Amharic: ሀገረ ማርያም ከሰም) or alternatively called Hagere Mariam and Kesem, is a woreda in Amhara Region, Ethiopia. Part of the Semien Shewa Zone, Hagere Mariamna Kesem is bordered on the south by the Germama (or Kesem) river which separates it from Menjarna Shenkora, on the west by the Oromia Region, on the north by Angolalla Tera, on northeast by Asagirt, and on the east by Berehet. The administrative center of this woreda is Shola Gebeya; other towns include Kese Koremash.

== Demographics ==
A 2012 estimate puts the population at 59,810. This gives a population density of 39.61 people per square kilometer (102.59 people per square mile), given its area of 1509.93 square kilometers (582.99 square miles), lower than the North Shewa Zone average of 126.20 people per square kilometer (326.87 people per square mile).

The two largest ethnic groups reported in Hagere Mariamna Kesem were the Amhara (96.78%), and the Oromo (3.09%); all other ethnic groups made up 0.13% of the population. Amharic was spoken as a first language by 96.74%, and Oromiffa was spoken by 3.17%; the remaining 0.31% spoke all other primary languages reported. The majority of the inhabitants practiced Ethiopian Orthodox Christianity, with 99.87% reporting that as their religion.

Based on the 2007 national census conducted by the Central Statistical Agency of Ethiopia (CSA), this woreda has a total population of 55,235, an increase of 20.72% over the 1994 census, of whom 28,394 are men and 26,841 women; 2,187 or 3.96% are urban inhabitants. With an area of 689.87 square kilometers, Hagere Mariamna Kesem has a population density of 80.07 people per square kilometer (94.74 people per square mile), which is less than the Zone average of 115.3 people per square kilometer (298.63 people per square mile). A total of 11,891 households were counted in this woreda, resulting in an average of 4.65 persons to a household, and 11,499 housing units.

The 1994 national census reported a total population for this woreda of 45,754 in 8,642 households, of whom 23,554 were men and 22,200 were women; 1,149 or 2.51% of its population were urban dwellers.
