= Ignazia Verzeri =

Italian Roman Catholic Benedictine nun

Saint Ignazia Verzeri
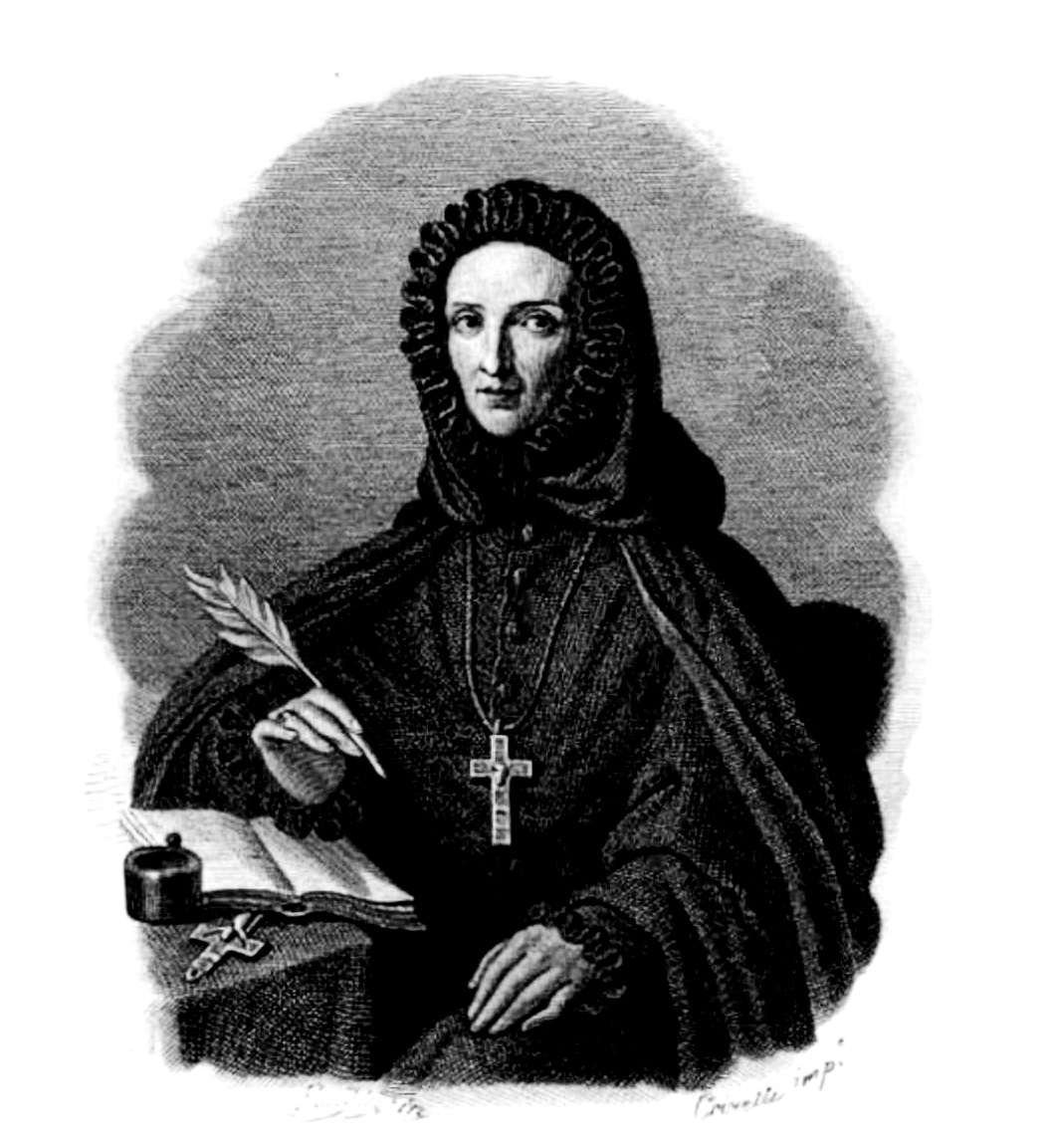

Nun
- Born: 31 July 1801; Bergamo, Cisalpine Republic
- Died: 3 March 1852 (aged 50); Brescia, Kingdom of Lombardy–Venetia
- Venerated in: Roman Catholic Church
- Beatified: 27 October 1946, Saint Peter's Basilica, Vatican City by Pope Pius XII
- Canonized: 10 June 2001, Saint Peter's Square, Vatican City by Pope John Paul II
- Feast: 3 March; 27 October (Brescia & Bergamo)
- Attributes: Religious habit
- Patronage: Daughters of the Sacred Heart of Jesus; Educators

Ignazia Verzeri (31 July 1801 – 3 March 1852) was an Italian Roman Catholic who became a Benedictine nun and established the Daughters of the Sacred Heart of Jesus. Her dedication to the needs of girls and their education was one of her top priorities. She established orphanages and provided assistance to the old and the ill. She assumed the name of "Teresa Eustochio" after she became a Benedictine.

She was beatified on 27 October 1946 after the recognition of two miracles attributed to her intercession and a third allowed for her canonization on 10 June 2001.

== Life ==
Ignazia Verzeri was born in Bergamo in 1801 as the eldest of seven children of Antonio Verzeri and Countess Elena Pedrocca-Grumelli. Her aunt Antonia Grumelli was a Franciscan Poor Clare nun and prophesied that she would enter into religious service: "God has destined you for this state to become the mother of holy children". Her brother was Girolamo Verzeri who would become the Bishop of Brescia on 30 September 1850.

Canon Giuseppe Benaglio, the Vicar General of Bergamo, oversaw her studies; later she studied with the Benedictine nuns of Santa Grata in Bergamo. A devout and intelligent child, Verzeri desired nothing more than to pursue a life of service to God and to discover that her vocation lay in religious life despite originally being apprehensive about what her vocation would entail.

On 8 February 1831, with the assistance of Benaglio, she founded the Daughters of the Sacred Heart of Jesus. She aimed for this new congregation to be a group that would focus on the lives of girls, particularly their education. Benaglio died in 1836, leaving her the task of leading the congregation alone. She worked tirelessly to establish orphanages and provided assistance in many ways to the old and to the sick.

Verzeri died on 3 March 1852 in Brescia.

== Legacy ==
Verzeri's congregation continued to flourish after her death and expanded on an international scale to places in Latin America such as Brazil, Argentina and Bolivia. It also expanded to Asia in India and to Africa in Cameroon and the Central African Republic. It also expanded in Europe to places such as Albania.

== Canonization ==
The canonization process opened on 23 August 1883 under Pope Leo XIII who granted her the title of Servant of God. Two processes were held both in Bergamo and in Rome. Pope Pius XI approved her life of heroic virtue and granted her the title of Venerable.

Two miracles attributed to her intercession allowed for Pope Pius XII to hold her beatification on 27 October 1946 and a third miracle attributed to her allowed for Pope John Paul II to canonize her on 10 June 2001.
