= Kristos Samra =

15th century Ethiopian saint

Saint Kristos Samra
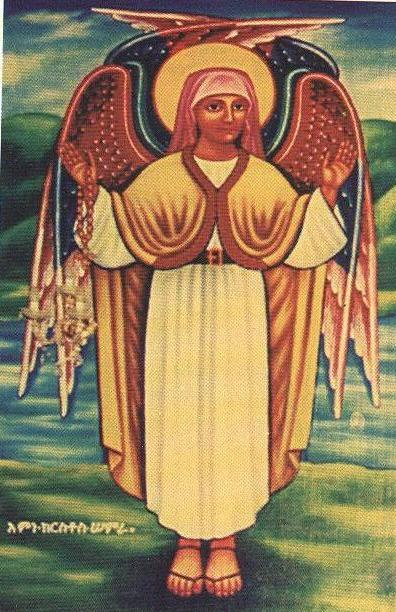
- Born: 15th century Bulga, Shewa, Ethiopian Empire
- Venerated in: Ethiopian Orthodox Tewahedo Church; Eritrean Orthodox Tewahedo Church; Coptic Orthodox Church of Alexandria
- Feast: 30 August (nehasə 24 in Ethiopian calendar)
- Attributes: Woman with two-sided wings
- Patronage: Ethiopians

Kristos Samra (Ge'ez: ክርስቶስ ሠምራ, romanized: Kristos Šemra, c. 15th century) was an Ethiopian female saint who founded an eponym monastery in Lake Tana.

She is one of Ethiopians over two-hundred indigenous saints and the earliest of about fourteen Ethiopian female saints.

She is venerated by both the Eritrean Orthodox Tewahedo Church, the Ethiopian Orthodox Tewahedo Church, and the Coptic Orthodox Church of Alexandria, with her feast day on 30 August.

== Life ==
Kristos Samra lived in the 15th century (no exact dates of her birth or death appear in her hagiography).

The main source on her life is the Gadle Kristos Samra (The Life of Kristos Samra), a hagiography written in Ethiopic by a scribe named Filippos about her around 1508. Before she died, she told Filippos her biography and thirty of her visions. He wrote her hagiography at the monastery of Debre Libanos sometime between 1450 and 1508. A translation of two portions of the hagiography are available in English; a print version translated into Amharic is also available.

According to her hagiography, the only contemporaneous source on her life, she was born into a wealthy and pious family from a frontier province in the Christian Ethiopian empire and married to the son of the emperor's own priest (priests can be married in the Ethiopian Orthodox Tewahedo Church). She gave birth to eight sons and two daughters.

When she was around forty years old, one day she became enraged with a badly behaved maidservant and thrust a firebrand down her throat and the maidservant died. Then Kristos Samra felt terrible and guilty and prayed for God to restore the life of the maidservant. Fortunately, her prayer was answered and the maid was brought back to life. Kristos Samra, amazed by what happened, ansked herself "if God hears my prayer while I'm in this worldly life, how much will he answer my prayer in a monastery?"

She decided to be a nun and started her journey to a spiritual life. But when she arrived at the monastery with her infant son, they told her that no males were allowed into the nunnery. She was traveling with that maidservant, who was carrying her baby son and insisted on being with Kristos Samra when she headed to the monastery. Then she left the child outside and by God's will another nun came and saved the boy and raised him. Another version has that Saint Michael the Archangel took the child to heaven.

Kristos Samra spent two years as a novice before becoming a nun. She then left for Lake Tana, a place known for its many monasteries and ascetic monks and nuns, to live the life of a hermit. As her first remarkable act, she spent twelve years praying while standing several hours a day in the shallow waters of the lake near the shore, an act common among devout Ethiopians. Living in solitude, she moved around the lake, staying at monasteries, including Narga Sellase and Tana Qirqos. During this period, she had visions, speaking with angels and saints as well as Christ and his mother the Virgin Mary.

In her most well-known vision, she traveled to heaven and hell to plead with Christ and Satan to reconcile themselves to each other so that human beings would no longer suffer due to their enmity.

Then the biblical Patriarchs came to her in a dream and told her to settle at Gʷangut, located on the southwestern end of Lake Tana. They told her that the entire world would come there to prostrate themselves at her feet. In response, she gave up the life of a hermit and founded a monastery.

A monk named Yishaq helped her by building a church, training female novices, and celebrating the liturgy. Eventually, she withdrew once again into solitude, standing in a pit for three years and in the lake for another three years.

She was buried at Gʷangʷət, after which her monastery is named at this place.

== Popularity ==
Some scholars, such as Ephraim Isaac, consider her to be one of the first female philosophers in Ethiopia, and many other countries. Her contemporary, Zara Yacob of 17th century Ethiopia is also seen as the first philosopher of Ethiopia, and Africa.

One scholar has stated that her hagiography is one of only "ten known biographies of African women written by Africans before the nineteenth century." Additionally, due to it is an "as-told-to" biography, "it is more of an intellectual autobiography, the narrative of one woman’s philosophy and her belief in the possibilities for healing a broken world".

Kristos Samra is such visionary medieval women saints as Julian of Norwich and Margery Kempe, Rabia of Basri and Lalla Aziza, and Mirabai.

In modern times, Kristos Samra is the most venerated saint in Ethiopia. With feast day of 30 August, her pilgrimage attracts thousand travellers in Lake Tana.
