= Daughters of the Sacred Heart of Jesus =

The Daughters of the Sacred Heart of Jesus (Italian: Figlie del Sacro Cuore di Gesù; Latin: Institutum Filiarum Sacratissimi Cordis Jesu; abbreviation: F.S.C.G.) is a religious institute of pontifical right for women, whose members profess public vows of chastity, poverty, and obedience and follow the evangelical way of life in common.

Their mission includes missionary work, pastoral ministry, education of youth, care of the sick.

This religious institute was founded in Bergamo, Italy, in 1831, by Ignazia Verzeri and Giuseppe Benaglio.

The sisters have houses in Albania, Argentina, Bolivia, Brazil, Cameroon, Central African Republic, India, Italy and Ivory Coast. The Generalate of the Congregation can be found in Rome, Italy.

On 31 December 2005 there are 595 sisters in 83 communities.
