= Germama River =

Germama River Kessem, Kesem
- Location within Ethiopia
- Etymology: "Frisky"

Location
- Country: Ethiopia
- Regions: Amhara, Oromia, Afar

Physical characteristics
- Source: Ethiopian Highlands
  - coordinates: 9°06′37″N 39°11′49″E
  - elevation: 1,989 m (6,526 ft)
- Mouth: Awash River
  - coordinates: 9°13′22″N 40°08′38″E
  - elevation: 754 m (2,474 ft)
- Length: 173 km (107 mi)
- Basin size: 3,744 km^{2} (1,446 sq mi)
- Discharge
  - location: Mouth
  - average: 13.9 m^{3}/s (490 cu ft/s)
  - minimum: 1.15 m^{3}/s (41 cu ft/s)
  - maximum: 79.8 m^{3}/s (2,820 cu ft/s)

Basin features
- Progression: Awash → Lake Abbe
- River system: Awash Basin
- Population: 640,000

The Germama (or Kesem or Kessem) River, is a tributary of the Awash River in Ethiopia. The name Germama comes from the [Afaan Oromoo language] word which means "frolicking", "boisterous", or "frisky".

The Germama is not a navigable stream, and flows with a great volume during the rainy season. It rises west of Kese Koremash, flowing east to the Awash, its course delineating a few kilometres of the northern boundary of the Awash National Park. The Kessem River passes an altitude drop from more than 2,000 m on a flow length of ca.130 km. The steep gradient of the river profile is the reason for its turbulent flow regime, which is also reflected in its name. The lowlands of the upper Germama was the location of the former Shewan district of Bulga; the lower course defines the northern boundary of the Shewan district of Menjar.

The Ethiopian Ministry of Water Resources began construction of a dam on the Germama in 2005, which would help irrigate areas along both sides of the river, and in the Dofen and Kebena Mountains. The dam was completed, however its water controlling gates were not fully functional. The dam was shut down in order to fix this issue, and was expected to resume full capacity within a year of January, 2024.
