= Angolalla Tera =

Angolalla Tera አንጎለላ ጠራ
- Woreda
- Flag
- Zone: Semien Shewa
- Region: Amhara Region

Area
  - Total: 782.49 km^{2} (302.12 sq mi)

Population (2012 est.)
  - Total: 89,533
  - Density: 114.42/km^{2} (296.35/sq mi)

Angolalla Tera (Amharic: አንጎለላ ጠራ) is one of the woredas in the Amhara Region of Ethiopia. It is named in part after one of the capitals of the former principality of Shewa, Angolalla. Located at the eastern edge of the Ethiopian Highlands in the Semien Shewa Zone, Angolela Tera is bordered on the south by Hagere Mariamna Kesem, on the west by the Oromia Region, on the north by Basona Werana, and on the southeast by Asagirt. The administrative center of this woreda is Chacha. Angolela Tera was part of former Angolalla Terana Asagirt woreda.

== Demographics ==
A 2012 estimate puts the population at 89,533. This gives a population density of 114.42 people per square kilometer (296.35 people per square mile), given its area of 782.49 square kilometers (302.12 square miles), lower than the North Shewa Zone average of 126.20 people per square kilometer (326.87 people per square mile).

Based on the 2007 national census conducted by the Central Statistical Agency of Ethiopia (CSA), this woreda has a total population of 82,349, of whom 41,849 are men and 40,500 women; 5,644 or 6.85% are urban inhabitants.

The majority of the inhabitants practiced Ethiopian Orthodox Christianity, with 99.1% reporting that as their religion.
