= Shewa =

Historical region of Ethiopia

Shewa: ሸዋ (Amharic); Shawaa (Oromo)
- Historical region of Ethiopia
- Map of Shewa
- Coordinates: 9°00′N 39°00′E
- Country: Ethiopia
- Largest City: Addis Ababa
- Regions: Oromia, Amhara, Central Ethiopia Regional State

Population
  - Estimate (2007): c. 15.6 Million
- Time zone: UTC+3 (East Africa Time)

Shewa (Amharic: ሸዋ; Oromo: Shawaa; Arabic: شيوا, Italian: Scioà), formerly romanized as Shua, Shoa, Showa, Shuwa, is a historical region of Ethiopia which was formerly an autonomous kingdom within the Ethiopian Empire. The modern Ethiopian capital Addis Ababa is located at its center.

== History ==
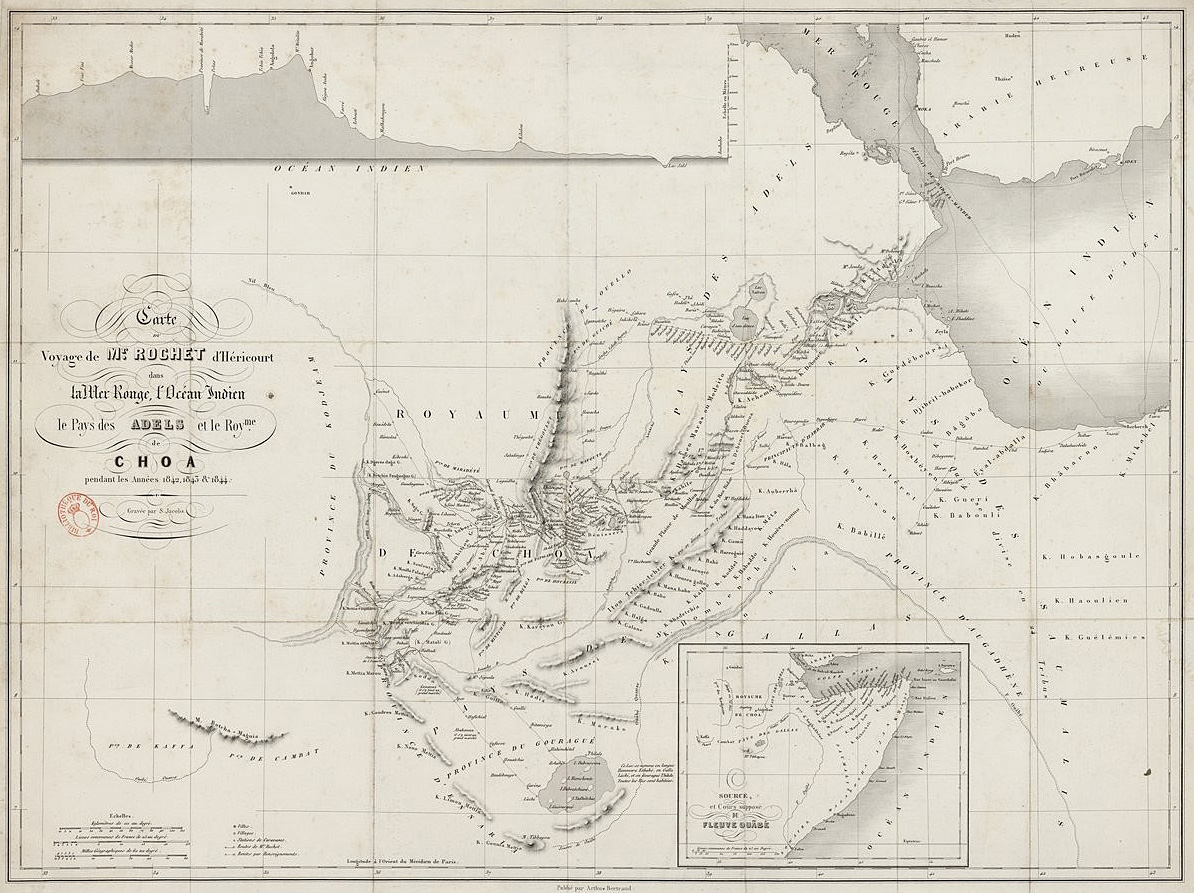
Rochet d'Héricourt's map of his 1842–1844 expedition, showing the Rouyam de Choa (Kingdom of the Choa)

Following the decline of the Kingdom of Aksum in the 10th century, the central highlands of Shewa became a primary refuge for the Aksumite royal line. Traditional Ethiopian historiography, supported by accounts in the Kebra Nagast, states that King Anbesa Wudm and his people fled to Shewa to escape the incursion of Queen Gudit. Shewa had maintained a pre-existing Amhara cultural landscape in the rugged highlands of Menz and Tegulet. Christianity was introduced to Shewa at a very early stage, most likely between the fourth and seventh centuries. It spread southward through a combination of trade routes, monastic travel, and the efforts of Aksumite missionaries. This period saw the emergence of numerous independent Christian groups that functioned as small, self-governing entities. While these communities followed the theological and liturgical traditions of the Aksumite Empire, they maintained their own distinct political sovereignty from Aksum and were led by their own local clergy and monastic figures. After the fall of Aksum, Shewa functioned as a "kingdom in exile" for the Solomonic line that fled Aksum while the Zagwe dynasty ruled from Lasta in the north.

The word "Shewa" is traditionally derived from the Amharic root for "rescue" or "to save", commemorating its role as a haven for the imperial lineage. The name Shewa first appears in the Makhzumi Chronicles, a 13th-century manuscript documenting the Makhzumi dynasty. The chronicle documents a significant conflict in 1128 AD between the Makhzumi dynasty and the Amhara, confirming that the Christian Aksumite descendants were already a dominant and organized military force in the highlands. These Arab merchants and immigrants, who claimed genealogical descent from the Makhzumi clan of the Quraysh, had settled in some parts of east Shewa.

The name Shewa appears in historical record as a location where Arab immigrants and merchants who claimed lineage from the Makhzumi dynasty settled. In 2006, a team of French archaeologists uncovered three urban centers believed to have been remnants of the former Sultanate of Ifat, with the Nora site in eastern Shewa being the most notable among them. While the Makhzumi dynasty ruled the region they settled in, the Amhara had a pre-existing presence and were already the dominant local force in the central highlands.

In 1270, Yekuno Amlak, a prince of the Shewan-based Aksumite lineage, overthrew the Zagwe dynasty and re-established the Solomonic Empire, with Shewa serving as its administrative heart. based his uprising against the Zagwe dynasty from an enclave in Shewa.

He claimed Solomonic forebears, direct descendants of the pre-Zagwe Axumite emperors, who had used Shewa as their safe haven when their survival was threatened by Gudit and other enemies. This is the reason why the region got the name "Shewa" which means 'rescue' or 'save'. This claim is supported by the Kebra Nagast, a book written under one of the descendants of Yekuno Amlak, which mentions Shewa as part of the realm of Menelik I. Aksum and its predecessor Dʿmt were mostly limited to Northern Ethiopia and Eritrea during the 1st millennium BCE. However, Shewa eventually became a part of Abyssinia upon the rise of the Amhara Solomonic dynasty.

Dawit I and his successors stayed in Fatagar (part of Shewa) for a long time in Tobya (Yifat, Fatagar). The province served as the birthplace of the future emperors Zara Yaqob and Dawit II. Zara Yaqob and Na'od would then make Debre Berhan and Zeway their capitals respectively. In 1528 Shewa was overrun by Muslim invaders from the Sultanate of Adal to the east, and its ancient cities were destroyed. According to "The Glorious Victories," the soldiers of Amda Seyon were from "Amhara and Sewä and Gojjam and Dämot, (men) who were trained in warfare, and dressed in gold and silver and fine clothes archers, spearmen, cavalry, and infantry with strong legs, trained for war. When they go to war they fight like eagles and run like wild goats; the (movement) of their feet is like the rolling of stones, and their sound is like the roaring of the sea, as says the prophet Herege'el: "I have heard the sound of the wings of the angels, as the noise of a camp." Such were the soldiers of 'Amda Seyon, full of confidence in war."

Most of Shewa was overrun by the Oromos during the late 16th century. Its eastern fringe was reportedly inhabited by the Harla people according to the Karrayyu Oromo. According to oral traditions, Shewa had a powerful king named Sarako, who prevented the people from bearing arms. A certain giant arose against Sarako, and his children, and destroyed them. When the clans of the Borana, Gombichu and Ada, entered Shewa, they found no-one to stop them, since the children of Sarako had been killed. Enrico Cerulli believes that this tradition is related to the Amhara tradition of an arrogant king, which is attributed to Emperor Dawit II. However, he also notes that Sarako is the Gurage name for Emperor Zara Yaqob, from this he concludes that the Oromo acquired the Sarako tradition through their contact with the Gurage.

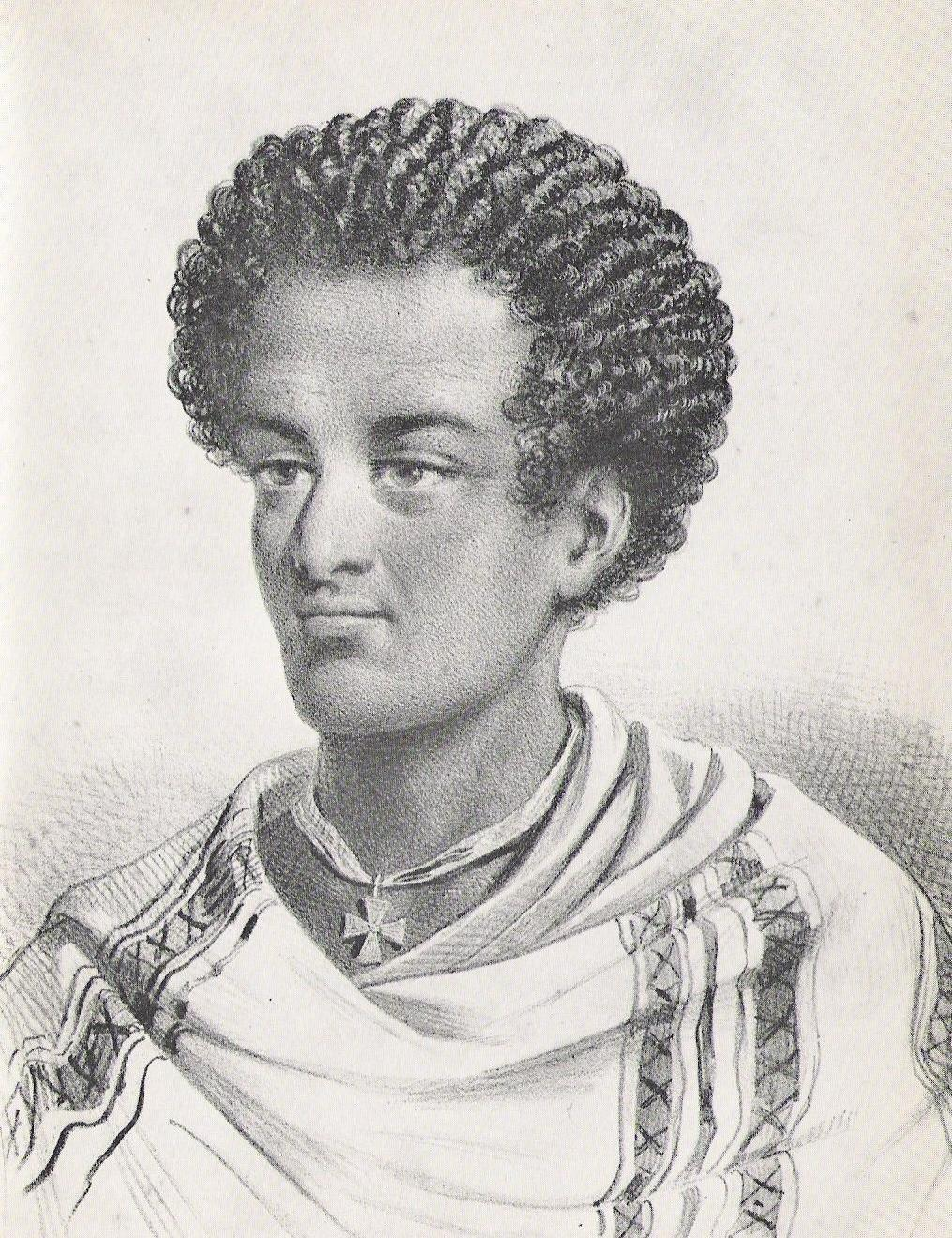
Sahle Selassie, king of Shewa from 1813 to 1847

The Amhara Shewan ruling family was founded in the late 17th century by Negasi Krestos, who consolidated his control around Ifat after expelling remnants of the Adalite polity and re-established a powerful Amhara dynasty in Shewa, centered on the historic districts of Menz, Tegulet, and Merhabete. These districts had long been centers of Amhara political power; Tegulet, for example, was associated with the early Solomonic dynasty, with Yekuno Amlak traditionally identified as a prince of Tegulet. Upon rising to power, Sahle Selassie aligned himself to the Abichu Oromo and turn his attention to the Tulama Oromo, whom he defeated in the early 1820s. He followed this victory by rebuilding Debre Birhan, which had been burned in an Oromo raid, as well as a number of other towns and consolidated his hold by founding a number of fortified villages, like Angolalla, in the Abichu territory. He extended the frontier of Shewa into Bulga and Karayu, to the southeast into Arsi, and as far south as the territories of the Gurage. After a few years, Sahle Selassie felt his position secure enough that he proclaimed himself Negus, or king, of Shewa, Ifat, the Oromo and the Gurage peoples, without the authority of the Emperor of Ethiopia in Gondar. During the nineteenth century, the regions to the immediate east of Shewa were predominantly influenced by the adjacent state, Emirate of Harar.

In 1841, the British entered into a free trade agreement with Shewa, designating the town of Aliyu Amba as a market center for Abyssinia. After the death of Sahle Selassie in 1847, Shewa fell under the rule of his son, Haile Melekot. Shewa soon attracted the attention of Emperor Tewodros II, who mobilized his army in Wollo and advanced into Shewa in October 1855. The Emperor advanced into Tegulet and around the same time the Oromo seized the opportunity to rebel and burnt Ankober to the ground. Haile Melekot, decided to prevent Debre Berhan from falling into the hands of his enemy and had the town put to flames, he then fled to a nearby hill where he hoped to hide but soon died of an illness on November 10. After Haile Melekot' death, Tewdoros' opponents rallied behind the late king's son, Menelik II. Tewdoros left his camp at Debre Berhan and pursued the boy to Bakarat where he was captured and imprisoned at his mountain stronghold in Amba Mariam. After crushing the Amhara opposition in the province, Tewdoros then turned his attention towards the Oromo and according to Zanab "exterminated all the Gallas, from Debre Berhan to Ankober so that their corpses covered the ground like a carpet."

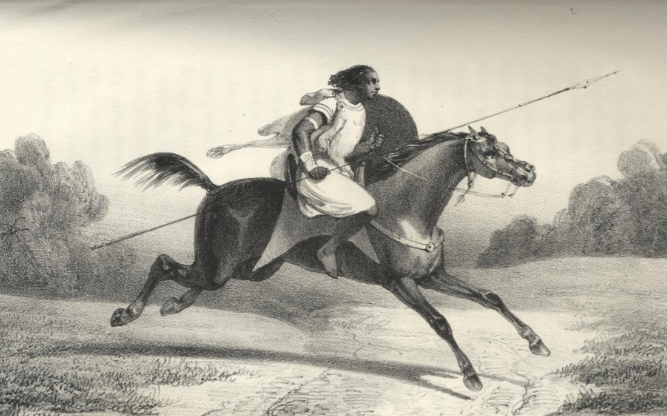
A sketch by Charles-Xavier Rochet d'Héricourt depicting a warrior from Shewa, 1841

Menelik II, who escaped from Amba Mariam at the end of June 1865 when he was twenty one years old, quickly returned to war-ravaged Shewa. During the first part of his reign, he ordered the reconstruction of various fortified towns such as Ankober, Debre Birhan and Warra Ilu. These sites had the advantage of being in the center of his realm, enabling him to remain in contact with the Christians to the south and the Muslim Oromos in the northeast. The area around these town moreover had rich pastures capable of feeding numerous cavalry and other livestock. After the Egyptian-Ethiopian War, Emperor Yohannes IV, who was angered over Menelik's claim to be the Emperor, marched into Shewa and ravaged the towns. Menelik, realizing that resistance was futile, was forced to submit to Yohannes.

Escaping influence from Yohannes, Menelik moved his capital south from Ankober to Mount Entoto in 1884. There, his wife Taytu Betul was attracted to a nearby spring known as Finfinne by the local Oromo inhabitants. In the spring of 1886, Menelik chose the site for Addis Ababa, his future capital. Building began at once, and, when Menelik became emperor of the whole country in 1889, Addis Ababa became the capital of Ethiopia.

== Notable people ==
- Meridazmatch and Negus of Shewa
- People from Addis Ababa

== See also ==
- North Shewa Zone (Amhara)
- History of Ethiopia
