= List of emperors of Ethiopia =

Imperial flag of Ethiopia

Imperial coat of arms of Ethiopia

This article lists the emperors of Ethiopia, from the founding of the Ethiopian Empire and the Solomonic dynasty in 1270 by Yekuno Amlak, until the Ethiopian Revolution of 1974 when the last emperor, Haile Selassie, was deposed in a coup d'état.

Earlier kings of the Dʿmt, Axum and Zagwe kingdoms are listed separately due to numerous gaps and large flexibility in chronology.

For legendary and archeologically unverified rulers of Ethiopian tradition, see Regnal lists of Ethiopia and 1922 regnal list of Ethiopia.

Names in italics indicate rulers who were usurpers or not widely recognized.

== Solomonic dynasty ==
Name	Lifespan	Reign start	Reign end	Notes	Family	Image
Yekuno Amlak: ይኩኖ አምላክ	Died 19 June 1285	10 August 1270	19 June 1285	Claimed to be descendant of Dil Na'od	Solomonic	Yekuno Amlak of Ethiopia
Yagbe'u Seyon: ይግብአ ጽዮን	Died 1294	19 June 1285	1294	Son of Yekuno Amlak	Solomonic	Yagbe'u Seyon of Ethiopia
Senfa Ared IV: ሰይፈ አርድ		1294	1295	Son of Yagbe'u Seyon	Solomonic	
Hezba Asgad: ሕዝበ አስግድ		1295	1296	Son of Yagbe'u Seyon	Solomonic	
Qedma Asgad: ቅድመ አስግድ		1296	1297	Son of Yagbe'u Seyon	Solomonic	
Jan Asgad: ጃን አሰግድ		1297	1298	Son of Yagbe'u Seyon	Solomonic	
Saba Asgad: ሳባ አሰገድ		1298	1299	Son of Yagbe'u Seyon	Solomonic	
Wedem Arad: ወደም አራድ	Died 1314	1299	1314	Brother of Yagbe'u Seyon	Solomonic	
Amda Seyon I: ዐምደ ጽዮን ቀዳማዊ	Died 1344	1314	1344	Son of Wedem Arad	Solomonic	Amda Seyon I of Ethiopia
Newaya Krestos: ንዋየ ክርስቶስ	Died 1372	1344	1372	Son of Amda Seyon I	Solomonic	
Newaya Maryam: ንዋየ ማርያም	Died 1382	1372	1382	Son of Newaya Krestos	Solomonic	
Dawit I: ዳዊት ቀዳማዊ	Died 6 October 1413	1382	6 October 1413	Son of Newaya Krestos	Solomonic	
Tewodros I: ቴዎድሮስ ቀዳማዊ	Died 1414	12 October 1413	23 June 1414	Son of Dawit I	Solomonic	
Yeshaq I: ይሥሓቅ ቀዳማዊ	Died 1429	1414	September 1429	Son of Dawit I	Solomonic	
Andreyas: እንድርያስ	Died March 1430	September 1429	March 1430	Son of Yeshaq I	Solomonic	
Takla Maryam: ተክለ ማርያም	Died 1433	March 1430	June 1433	Son of Dawit I	Solomonic	
Sarwe Iyasus: ሥርወ ኢየሱስ	Died 1433	June 1433	November 1433	Son of Takla Maryam	Solomonic	
Amda Iyasus: ዐምደ ኢየሱስ	Died June 1434	November 1433	June 1434	Son of Takla Maryam	Solomonic	
Zara Yaqob: ዘርአ ያዕቆብ	1399 – 26 August 1468 (aged 69)	19/20 June 1434	26 August 1468	Son of Dawit I	Solomonic	Zara Yaqob of Ethiopia
Baeda Maryam I: ቀዳማዊ በእደ ማርያም	1448 – 8 November 1478 (aged 30)	26 August 1468	8 November 1478	Son of Zara Yaqob	Solomonic	
Eskender: እስክንድር	15 July 1471 – 7 May 1494 (aged 22)	1478	7 May 1494	Son of Baeda Maryam I	Solomonic	
Amda Seyon II: ዐምደ ጽዮን	c. 1487 – 26 October 1494 (aged ≈ 7)	1494	26 October 1494	Son of Eskender	Solomonic	
Na'od: ናዖድ	Died 31 July 1508	1494	31 July 1508	Son of Baeda Maryam I	Solomonic	
Dawit II or Libne Dengel: ዳዊት ዳግማዊ or ልብነ ድንግል	1501 – 2 September 1540 (aged 39)	1508	2 September 1540	Son of Na'od	Solomonic	Dawit II of Ethiopia
Gelawdewos: ገላውዴዎስ	1521/1522 – 23 March 1559 (aged 38–37)	3 September 1540	23 March 1559	Son of Dawit II	Solomonic	Gelawdewos of Ethiopia
Menas: ሚናስ	Died 1 February 1563	1559	1 February 1563	Son of Dawit II	Solomonic	Minas of Ethiopia
Sarsa Dengel: ሠርጸ ድንግል	1550 – 4 October 1597 (aged 47)	1563	4 October 1597	Son of Menas	Solomonic	Sarsa Dengel of Ethiopia
Yaqob: ያዕቆብ	c. 1590 – 10 March 1606	1597; 1604	September 1603; 10 March 1606	Son of Sarsa Dengel	Solomonic	
Za Dengel: ዘድንግል	Died 24 October 1604	September 1603	24 October 1604	Nephew of Sarsa Dengel	Solomonic	
Susenyos I: Susenyos the Catholic; ሱስንዮስ ቀዳማዊ	1572 – 17 September 1632 (aged 60)	1606	17 September 1632	Grandson of Dawit II	Solomonic	Susenyos I of Ethiopia

=== Gondarine period ===
Name	Lifespan	Reign start	Reign end	Notes	Family	Image
Fasilides: ፋሲለደስ	20 November 1603 – 18 October 1667 (aged 63)	1632	18 October 1667	Son of Susenyos I	Solomonic	Fasilides of Ethiopia
Yohannes I: ዮሐንስ ቀዳማዊ	c. 1640 – 19 July 1682 (aged ≈ 42)	18 October 1667	19 July 1682	Son of Fasilides	Solomonic	Yohannes I of Ethiopia
Iyasu I: Iyasu the Great; ኢያሱ ቀዳማዊ	1654 – 13 October 1706 (aged 52)	19 July 1682	13 October 1706	Son of Yohannes I	Solomonic	Iyasu I of Ethiopia
Yeshaq Iyasu	Died 1685	1685	1685	Claimed to be grandson of Susenyos I	Claimed Solomonic	
Tekle Haymanot I: Tekle Haymanot the Cursed; ተክለ ሃይማኖት ቀዳማዊ	28 March 1684 – 30 June 1708 (aged 24)	27 March 1706	30 June 1708	Son of Iyasu I	Solomonic	
Amda Seyon	Died September 1707	September 1707	September 1707		Non-dynastic	
Tewoflos: ቴዎፍሎስ	Died 14 October 1711	1 July 1708	14 October 1711	Son of Fasilides	Solomonic	
Nebahne Yohannes		1709	July 1710		Non-dynastic	
Yostos: ዮስጦስ	Died 1716	14 October 1711	19 February 1716	Grandson of Iyasu I	Solomonic	
Dawit III: Dawit the Singer; ዳዊት ሣልሳዊ	1695 – 18 May 1721 (aged 26)	8 February 1716	18 May 1721	Son of Iyasu I	Solomonic	
Bakaffa: በካፋ	Died 19 September 1730	18 May 1721	19 September 1730	Son of Iyasu I	Solomonic	Bakaffa of Ethiopia
Iyasu II: ኢያሱ ዳግማዊ	21 October 1723 – 27 June 1755 (aged 31)	19 September 1730	27 June 1755	Son of Bakaffa	Solomonic	Iyasu II of Ethiopia
Hezqeyas		1736	1737		Solomonic	
Iyoas I: ኢዮአስ ቀዳማዊ	c. 1740 – 14 May 1769 (aged ≈ 29)	27 June 1755	7 May 1769	Son of Iyasu II	Solomonic	Iyoas I of Ethiopia

=== Era of the Princes ===
Name	Lifespan	Reign start	Reign end	Notes	Family	Image
Yohannes II: ዮሐንስ ዳግማዊ	1699 – 18 October 1769 (aged 70)	7 May 1769	18 October 1769	Son of Iyasu I	Solomonic	
Tekle Haymanot II: ተክለ ሃይማኖት ዳግማዊ	1754 – 7 September 1777 (aged 23)	18 October 1769; December 1770	August 1770; 13 April 1777	Son of Yohannes II	Solomonic	
Susenyos II: ሱስንዮስ ዳግማዊ	Died c. 1771	August 1770	December 1770	Possibly the illegitimate son of Iyasu II	Solomonic	
Salomon II: ሰሎሞን ዳግማዊ	Died 1782	13 April 1777	20 July 1779	Son of Abeto Adigo	Solomonic	
Tekle Giyorgis I: ተክለ ጊዮርጊስ ቀዳማዊ	c. 1751 – 12 December 1817 (aged ≈ 66)	20 July 1779; 24 April 1788; January 1794; December 1795; 4 January 1798; 24 March 1800	8 February 1784; 26 July 1789; 15 April 1795; 20 May 1796; 20 May 1799; June 1800	Son of Yohannes II	Solomonic	
Iyasu III: እያሱ ሣልሳዊ	Died by 1810	16 February 1784	24 April 1788	Grandson of Iyasu II	Solomonic	
Iyasu	Died May 1813	1787	1788	In opposition to Iyasu III	Non-dynastic	
Baeda Maryam		1787	1788	In opposition to Iyasu III	Non-dynastic	
Tekle Haymanot	Died before 1810	February 1788	1789	In opposition to Iyasu III	Non-dynastic	
Hezqeyas: ሕዝቅያስ	Died 13 September 1813	26 July 1789	January 1794	Son of Iyasu III	Solomonic	
Baeda Maryam II: በእደ ማርያም ዳግማዊ	1749 – 1833 (aged 84)	15 April 1795	December 1795	Possibly son of Salomon II	Possibly Solomonic	
Salomon III: ሰሎሞን ሣልሳዊ		20 May 1796; 20 May 1799	15 July 1797; 15 July 1799	Son of Tekle Haymanot II	Solomonic	
Yonas: ዮናስ	Died May 1813	18 August 1797	4 January 1798	Grandson of Fasilides	Solomonic	
Demetros: ድሜጥሮስ	Died 1802	25 July 1799; June 1800	24 March 1800; June 1801	Son of Arqedewos	Non-dynastic	
Egwale Seyon: እጓለ ጽዮን	Died 12 June 1818	June 1801	12 June 1818	Son of Hezqeyas	Solomonic	
Iyoas II: ኢዮአስ ዳግማዊ	Died 3 June 1821	14 June 1818	3 June 1821	Son of Hezqeyas	Solomonic	
Gigar: ጊጋር	c. 1745 – 26 November 1832 (aged ≈ 87)	3 June 1821; April 1826	April 1826; 18 June 1830	Possibly son of Iyasu II	Possibly Solomonic	
Baeda Maryam III		April 1826	April 1826		Non-dynastic	
Iyasu IV: ኢያሱ		18 June 1830	18 March 1832	Son of Salomon III	Solomonic	
Gebre Krestos: ገብረ ክሪስቶስ		18 March 1832; 1832	1832; 8 June 1832	Allegedly a descendant of Fasilides	Allegedly Solomonic	
Sahle Dengel: ሣህለ ድንግል	1778 – 11 February 1855 (aged 77)	1832; October 1832; October 1841; 1845; 1851	1832; 29 August 1840; 1845; 1850; 11 February 1855	Brother of Gebre Krestos	Solomonic	
Egwale Anbesa		1832	1832		Non-dynastic	
Yohannes III: ዮሐንስ ሣልሳዊ	c. 1797 – c. 1873 (aged ≈ 76)	30 August 1840; 1845; 1850	October 1841; 1845; 1851	Son of Tekle Giyorgis I	Solomonic	

=== Modern Era ===
Name	Lifespan	Reign start	Reign end	Notes	Family	Image
Tewodros II: ቴዎድሮስ	c. 1818 – 13 April 1868 (aged ≈ 50)	11 February 1855	13 April 1868 (Note: Committed suicide at the end of the Battle of Magdala.)	Son of Haile Giorgis Wolde Giorgis	Solomonic	Tewodros II of Ethiopia
Tekle Giyorgis II: ተክለ ጊዮርጊስ ዳግማዊ	1836 – 21 June 1873 (aged 36–37)	11 June 1868	11 July 1871	Son of Wagshum Gebre Medhin	Solomonic (Note: Claimed the Solomonic lineage through his mother. Also claimed the Zagwe lineage through his father.)	Tekle Giyorgis II of Ethiopia

==== Tigrayan line ====
Name	Lifespan	Reign start	Reign end	Notes	Family	Image
Yohannes IV: ዮሓንስ አርባእዊ	11 July 1837 – 10 March 1889 (aged 51)	11 July 1871	10 March 1889 (Note: Killed in the Battle of Gallabat.)	Son of Dejazmatch Mercha Wolde Kidan	Solomonic	Yohannes IV of Ethiopia

==== Shewan line ====
Name	Lifespan	Reign start	Reign end	Notes	Family	Image
Menelik II (Note: Previously King of Shewa from 1855 to 1856, and from 1865 to 1889. Ruled under the regency of Ras Betwoded Tessema Nadew from 1909 to 1911 and Lij Iyasu from 1911 to 1913.): ምኒልክ ዳግማዊ	17 August 1844 – 12 December 1913 (aged 69)	10 March 1889	12 December 1913	Son of Negus Haile Melekot	Solomonic	Menelik II of Ethiopia
Lij Iyasu (Note: Never officially crowned as Emperor. Deposed by nobility with the sanction of the Church.): Iyasu V (Note: Lij Iyasu was never referred to as "Iyasu V" or as an emperor during his rule, either by Ethiopians or by foreigners. Thus, in the treaty of commerce signed between the United States and Ethiopia in June 1914, the ruler of Ethiopia is referred to as "His Royal Highness, Prince Lidj Yassou".); ልጅ ኢያሱ	4 February 1895 – 25 November 1935 (aged 40)	12 December 1913	27 September 1916	Grandson of Menelik II	Solomonic	Lij Iyasu of Ethiopia
Zewditu (Note: Ruled under the regency of Ras Tafari Makonnen (future Emperor Haile Selassie).): ዘውዲቱ	29 April 1876 – 2 April 1930 (aged 53)	27 September 1916	2 April 1930 (Note: Died in the immediate aftermath of the Gugsa Wale's rebellion.)	Daughter of Menelik II	Solomonic	Zewditu of Ethiopia
Haile Selassie (Note: De facto ruler of the country as regent from 1916 to 1930. Crowned as King in the aftermath of the 1928 coup d'état.) (Note: Exiled from 2 May 1936 to 5 April 1941, during the Italian occupation. During that time, the imperial title was claimed by the King of Italy Victor Emmanuel III.) (Note: Briefly deposed during the 1960 coup attempt.): ኀይለ ሥላሴ ቀዳማዊ	23 July 1892 – 27 August 1975 (aged 83)	2 April 1930 (Note: Crowned on 2 November 1930, at the St. George's Cathedral in Addis Ababa.)	12 September 1974 (Note: Deposed by the Derg during the Ethiopian Revolution of 1974.)	Son of Ras Makonnen Wolde Mikael	Solomonic	Haile Selassie of Ethiopia
Amha Selassie (Note: Proclaimed Emperor by the Imperial Guards during the 1960 coup attempt.) (Note: Designated "King" (not Emperor) by the Derg while out of the country, did not take throne.): Crown Prince Asfaw Wossen; አምሃ ሥላሴ	27 July 1916 – 17 January 1997 (aged 80)	12 September 1974	21 March 1975	Son of Haile Selassie	Solomonic	Amha Selassie of Ethiopia

== House of Savoy (Italian occupation) ==
Name	Lifespan	Reign start	Reign end	Notes	Family	Image
Victor Emmanuel III: Vittorio Emanuele III ቪቶርዮ አማኑኤል (Vītoriyo Āmanu’ēli)	11 November 1869 – 28 December 1947 (aged 78)	14 May 1936	De jure renounced the title in November 1943 (de facto loss of control in April 1941)	King of Italy, proclaimed Emperor of Ethiopia after Italian victory in the Second Italo-Ethiopian War; the title was contested by Haile Selassie in exile. Italian defeat in the East African campaign of World War II, and later Italian capitulation, ended Italian pretensions of rulership over Ethiopia.	Savoy	Victor Emmanuel III of Italy

== See also ==
- Emperor of Ethiopia
  - Emperors of Ethiopia Family tree
- President of Ethiopia
  - List of presidents of Ethiopia
- Prime Minister of Ethiopia
  - List of heads of government of Ethiopia
- List of royal consorts of Ethiopia
- Zera Yacob Amha Selassie
- Girma Yohannes Iyasu
- Crown Council of Ethiopia
- Ethiopian aristocratic and court titles
- List of rulers of Shewa
- Government of the Ethiopian Empire
- History of Ethiopia
  - Ethiopian historiography
