= Gondarine period =

1632–1769 period of Ethiopian history

- 1632–1769
Medieval period	Zemene Mesafint
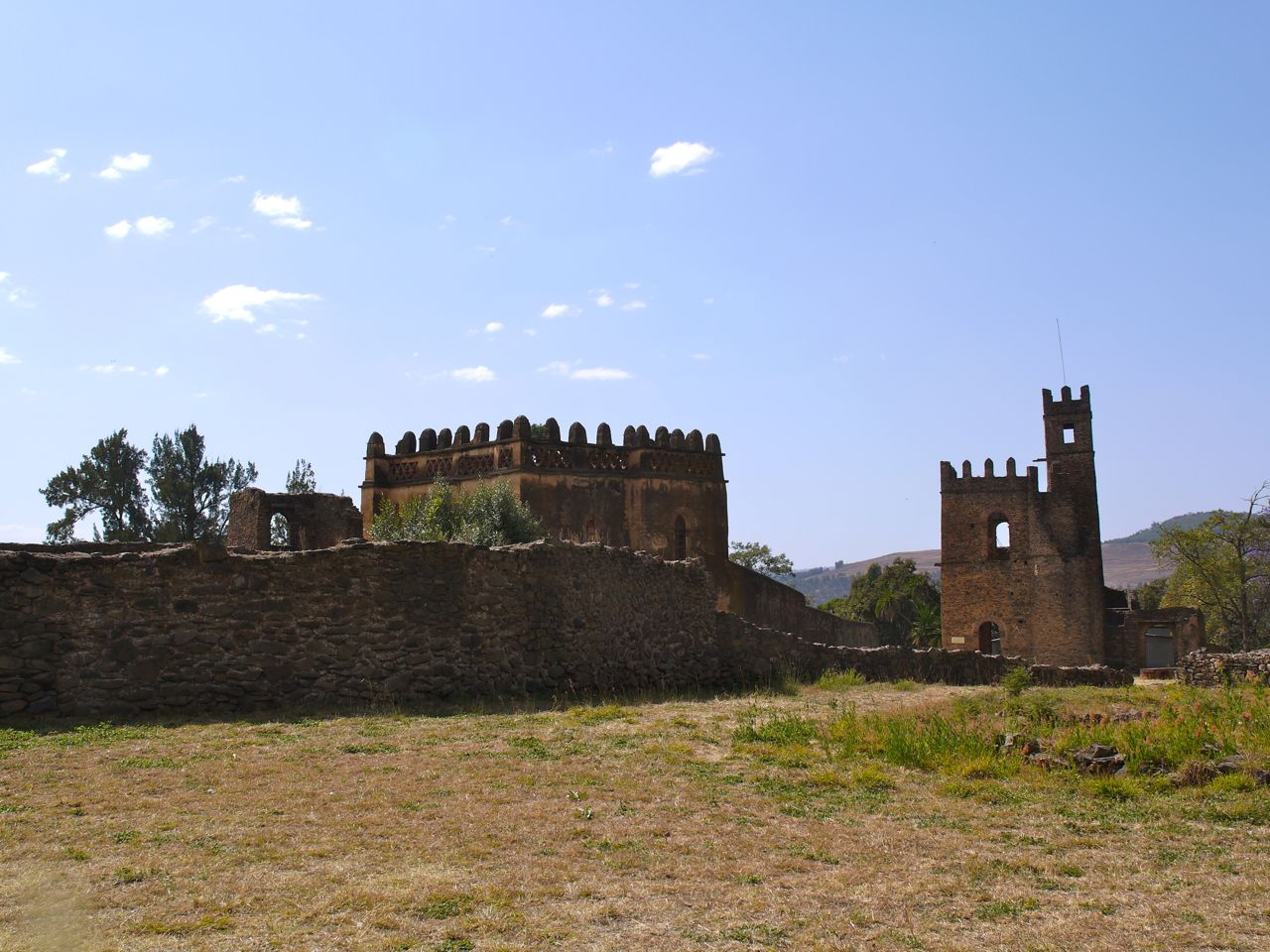
- The Fasil Ghebbi in Gondar, an important royal fortress in that era
- Location: Gondar; Amhara Province, Ethiopian Empire
- Monarch(s): Fasilides; Yohannes I Iyasu I Tekle Haymanot I Tewoflos; Yostos; Dawit III; Bakaffa; Iyasu II; Iyoas I
- Key events: Founding of Gondar in 1636; Death of Iyasu II in 1755 that led brief dynastic conflicts; Assassination of Iyoas I by Ras Mikael Sehul in 1769; Coronation of Emperor Yohannes II

The Gondarine period (alt. Gondarian) was a period of Ethiopian history between the ascension of Emperor Fasilides in 1632 and a period of decentralization in 1769, known as the Zemene Mesafint ("Era of the Princes").

Gondar was founded by Emperor Fasilides in 1636 as a permanent capital, and became a highly stable, prosperous commercial center. This period saw profound achievements in Ethiopian art, architecture, and innovations such as the construction of the royal complex Fasil Ghebbi, and 44 churches that were established around Lake Tana. In the arts, the Gondarine period saw the creation of diptychs and triptychs, murals and illuminated manuscripts, mostly with religious motifs.

The death of Iyasu I in 1706 began the slow decline in Gondar's supremacy. Emperor Iyasu I's regent, Empress Mentewab, brought her brother Ras Wolde Leul to Gondar and made him Ras Bitwaded. After this and Iyasu II’s death in 1755, brief dynastic conflicts occurred between Mentewab's Quaregnoch and the Yejju groups led by Wubit.

The Gondarine period ended when Tigray governor Ras Mikael Sehul assassinated Iyoas I in 1769 which marked the beginning of the country's decentralized Zemene Mesafint period, which lasted until Emperor Tewodros II reunified the Ethiopian Empire in 1855 in its modern form.

== History ==
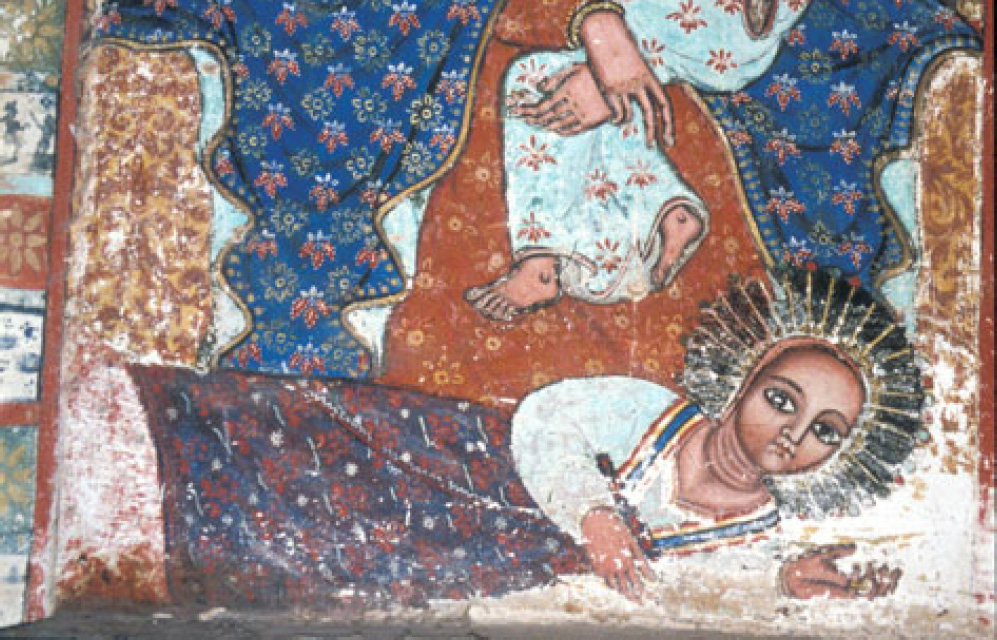
Contemporary painting of Empress Mentewab at Narga Selassie Church (18th century)

Established in 1636 by Emperor Fasilides as the permanent capital of the Ethiopian Empire near Axum and Lalibela, Gondar became a commercial and religious center, with Ethiopian traders called Jeberti, and experienced a period of renewed stability in the Solomonic dynasty. The Gondarine period saw numerous innovations, including the development of Christian iconography. The earliest style of art lasted until the early 18th century and was noted for its warmth of color, careful finish and richness of design. Gondar possessed favorable trade routes leading south of the Blue Nile and to northwestern regions like Massawa and Sudan. Gondar also became renowned for the architecture of the imperial palaces, collectively known as Fasil Ghebbi.

Fasilides sought to establish diplomatic relations with the Zaydi imam of Yemen Al-Mutawakkil Isma'il from 1642 to 1647, in order to establish trade routes that bypassed Ottoman-held Massawa, but was ultimately unsuccessful. During this period, the Agaw rebellion in Lasta recurred, started by Susenyos.

In 1637, the leader Melka Kristos entered his palace to reclaim his throne, to which Fasilides quickly responded by dispatching Qegnazmach Dimmo, governor of Semien, and his brother Gelawdewos, governor of Begemder. Kristos was eventually defeated at Libo. In the following year, he marched to Lasta, where and retreated to the mountain stronghold there; "almost the whole army perished amidst the mountains, great part from famine, but a greater still from cold,” according to writer James Bruce.

After Emperor Iyasu I’s death in 1706, Gondar began to decay as most Gondarine emperors preferred luxurious city life to spending time in politics. Empress Regent of Emperor Iyasu I, Mentewab, brought her brother Ras Wolde Leul to Gondar and made him Ras Bitwaded. After Iyasu II’s death in 1755, brief dynastic conflicts occurred between Mentewab's Quaregnoch and Yejju Wollo groups led by Wubit. In 1757, Tigray governor Ras Mikael Sehul occupied Gondar. His wish was to not only become emperor but to consider himself the real leader of the Gondarine period. Emperor Iyoas I was an infant at that time who had no power. In 1769, Ras Mikael Sehul successfully killed Iyoas and crowned 70-year-old Yohannes II, ushering in the decentralized Zemene Mesafint (Era of Princes) era.

== Arts ==
Gondarine art drew on the Byzantine world’s religious motifs, with elements including illuminated manuscripts, murals, and icons from diptych and triptychs. Diptych painting by the author Walda Mariam also contributed to the Egyptian Monastery of Saint Anthony murals. The diptych painting of the Passion of Christ in Qaha Iyasus exemplifies a desire of visual imagery in Ethiopian art. Gondarine art was also influenced by Western Baroque and Renaissance paintings through prints brought by the Jesuits in the 16th or 17th century.

Scholars classify Gondarine art into two phases: the first used bright colors and an absence of shading, while the second used darker shades of color that developed during the reign of Iyasu II.

== Jesuits ==
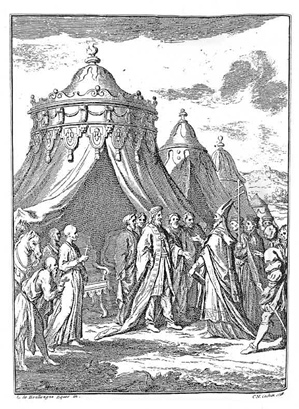
Emperor Susenyos I receiving Portuguese Jesuit Afonso Mendes

Upon the abdication of his father Susenyos I, who permitted the Catholic Church in Ethiopia as state religion from 1622, Fasilides sought to expel all Jesuits from Ethiopia and restore the state primacy of the Ethiopian Orthodox Tewahedo Church in his empire. In 1622 Jesuit Afonso Mendes and Jerónimo Lobo, were forcefully expelled under death penalty by Fasilides, to Fremona. During the early 18th century, a few Franciscan and Capuchin friars sponsored by the Roman missionary agency Sacra Congregatio de Propaganda lived there for some years. Among them were Franciscan Giuseppe Maria di Gerusalemme, Remedius Prutky (who left a valuable report on the city), and the Jesuits Grenier and Paulet.

== Architecture ==
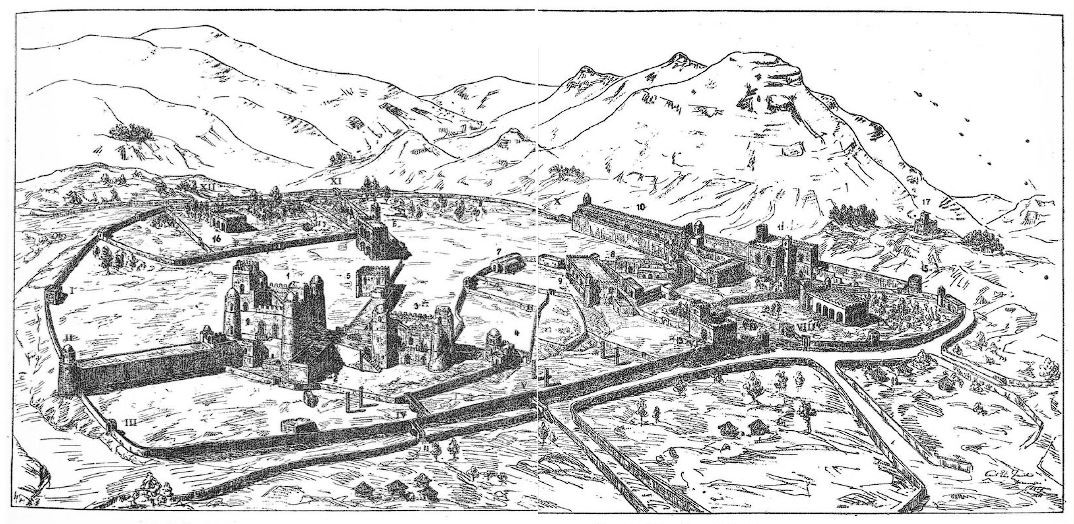
Pictorial diagram of Fasil Ghebbi

One of the most iconic works of Gondarine architecture was a royal complex known as Fasil Ghebbi and 44 churches that were built around Lake Tana including Adababay Iyasus, Adababay Tekle Haymanot, Atatami Mikael, Gemjabet Mariyam, Fit Mikael and Qeddus Abbo. Fasilides was also credited with building seven stone bridges including the Sebrara Dildiy bridge over the Blue Nile. Fasilides contributed a new church at the Cathedral of Church of Our Lady Mary of Zion at Axum, named "Old Cathedral" which stands next to the newer cathedral built by Emperor Haile Selassie. According to legend, the Ethiopian Orthodox Tewahedo Church would be constructed by the name of letter "G". As a result, the Emperor behind Fasilides often built stone castles in Gorgora, Gomange, Guzara and Gannata Iyasus. After becoming aware of the fact, the scenario of urban life in Ethiopia was conceptualized by building more royal camps with replacement of semi-itinerants royal tents to stone and mortar.

The arrival of the Portuguese in the mid-16th century also influenced the architecture style in the Gondarine era, primarily through the building of fortresses and castles. During Roman Catholic state administration under Susenyos, he employed Arab, Gujarati (brought by the Jesuits) and their masonic style with local masons, such as Beta Israel. Turkish architecture also influenced Gondarine architecture through Ottoman incursions, which further increased the prevalence of defense buildings and castles in the area. The style continued to prevail in Fasilides' reign through the Gondarine period and the 17th and 18th century, and went on to influence 19th century design.

== Philosophy ==
Ethiopian philosophers like Zera Yacob, known for his treatise on religion, morality, and reason, known as Hatata and Walda Heywat became prominent at this time.
