= Zemene Mesafint =

1769–1855 period of Ethiopian history

- 1769–1855
Gondarine period	Modern era
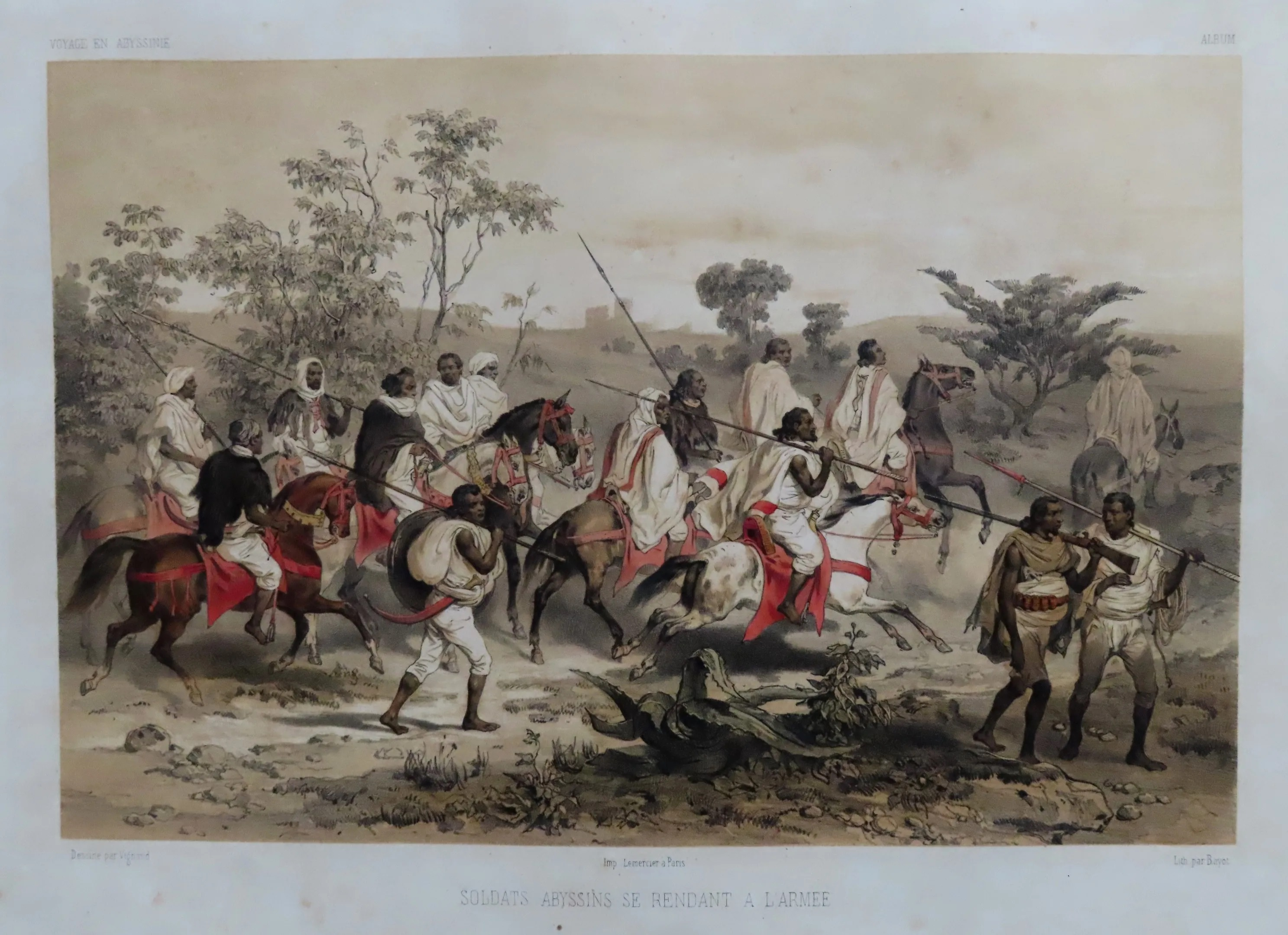
- Ethiopian warriors during the Zemene Mesafint
- Location: Ethiopian Empire
- Monarchs: List: Yohannes II; Susenyos II; Tekle Haymanot II; Salomon II; Tekle Giyorgis I; Iyasu III; Hezqeyas; Baeda Maryam II; Salomon III; Yonas; Demetros; Egwale Seyon; Iyoas II; Gigar; Baeda Maryam III; Iyasu IV; Gebre Krestos; Sahle Dengel
- Key events: See History section Main battles: Battle of Amba Jebelli; Battle of Ayshal; Battle of Debre Abbay; Battle of Gur Amba; Battle of Madab; Battle of Takusa

The Zemene Mesafint (Ge'ez: ዘመነ ፡ መሳፍንት) variously translated as the "Era of Judges", "Era of the Princes" or "Age of Princes" (taken from the biblical Book of Judges) was a period in Ethiopian history between the mid-18th and mid-19th centuries when the country was de facto divided into several regions with no effective central authority. It was a period in which the Emperors from the Solomonic dynasty were reduced to little more than figureheads confined to the capital city of Gondar. For the most part, the regional lords were tightly related by marriage and constituted a stable ruling elite that prevailed until the mid 20th century. The period also saw the weakening of Ethiopian territorial integrity in the north with the encroachment of the Ottoman Empire in the Ethiopian-Ottoman border conflict along with a renewal of diplomatic relations with Christian Europe after the isolationist Gondarine period and the expansion of the Shewan kingdom into the territory of the southern Oromo. The most powerful lords during the Zemene Mesafint were Ras Mikael Sehul of Tigre and later the Warra Seh Dynasty who included Ras Ali I, Ras Aligaz, Ras Gugsa and Ras Ali II based in Yejju, a region in Wollo. The most powerful lords such as Ras Ali and Ras Gugsa were members of the Warra Sheikh (or Warra Seh), a dynasty that were made up of former Muslims from Wollo. Other regional lords included Kenfu Hailu of Gondar, Ras Hailu Yosedeq of Gojjam, Sabagadis Woldu of Tigre, Ras Wolde Selassie of Tigre, Wube Haile Mariam of Simien, Ras Dullu of Menz and provincial king Sahle Selassie of Shewa.

Maimire Mennasemay has likened this period somewhat similar to China's Warring States Period. The lords fought against each other for expansion of their territory and to become the guardian of the kings of kings in Gondar (or Gonder), the capital of the empire at the time. The monarchy continued only in name because of its sacred character. This nominal but divinely ordained monarchy preserved the dynasty from actual extinction.

== History ==
=== Early history, Solomonic succession conflicts (1700s–1730) ===
Traditionally, the beginning of this period is set on the date Ras Mikael Sehul deposed Emperor Iyoas I (7 May 1769), and its end to Kassa's coronation as Emperor Tewodros II (11 February 1855), having defeated in battle all of his rivals. Some historians date the death of Iyasu I (Iyasu the Great) (13 October 1706), and the resultant decline in the prestige of the dynasty, as the beginning of this period. Others date it to the beginning of Iyoas's reign (26 June 1755).

During the Zemene Mesafint, various lords occasionally took advantage of their positions by making Emperors and encroaching upon the succession of the dynasty, by candidates among the nobility itself: for example, on the death of Emperor Tewoflos in 1711, the chief nobles of Ethiopia feared that the cycle of vengeance that had characterised the reigns of Tewoflos and Tekle Haymanot I (1706–1708) would continue if a member of the Solomonic dynasty were picked for the throne, so they selected one of their own, Yostos, to be King of Kings (nəgusä nägäst). However, the tenure of Yostos from 1711 to 1716 was brief, and the throne came into the hands of the Solomonic house once again.

Following the assassination of Emperor Tekle Haymanot I (r. 1706–1708) and the reign of Tewoflos who died in 1711, soldiers and nobles installed Yostos (r. 1711–1716) on the throne. This reflected a broader trend during the Zemene Mesafint, where powerful lords manipulated imperial succession, as nobles feared a continuation of past vendettas they chose Yostos, a fellow noble, over a Solomonic heir. However, his weak claim to the throne and church opposition led to his downfall—he was poisoned, and Dawit III (r. 1716–1721) was installed. He too was later assassinated. The imperial guard then placed Bakaffa (r. 1721–1730) on the throne, expecting him to be weak. However, he proved assertive, purging corrupt nobles and replacing unreliable forces with Oromo recruits from Damot. Bekaffa restored central authority, subduing rebellious provinces like Wag, Lasta, Tigray, and Bahir Meder. Upon his death, his young son, Iyasu II (r. 1730–1755), inherited the throne under the regency of his mother, Empress Mentewab. An Oromo noble from Kwara, she strengthened Oromo influence by appointing relatives to key positions. After a failed noble coup (1735–1736), she reinforced Oromo dominance, and their language often overshadowed Amharic at court.

=== Solomonic succession conflicts (1730–1769) ===
==== Reign of Iyasu II (1730–1755) ====
The reign of Iyasu II (1730–1755) had brought the empire once again to disaster. He ascended the throne as a child, allowing his mother, Empress Mentewab to play a major role as his Regent from 1723 to 1730. Mentewab had herself crowned as co-ruler in 1730, becoming the first woman to be crowned in this manner in Ethiopian history. Beyond the capital of Gondar, the Empire suffered from regional conflict between regions that had been part of the Empire for hundreds of years—the Agaw, Amharans, Tigrayans and the Oromo.

==== Reign of Iyoas (1755–1769) ====
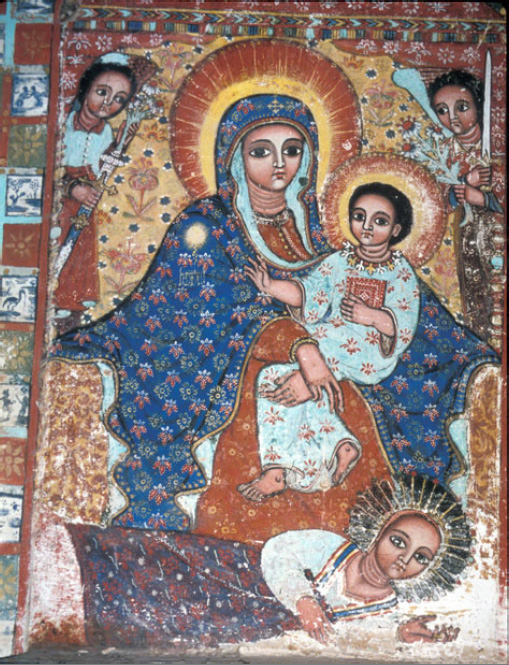
Empress Mentewab, an important figure of the Zemene Mesafint, prostrating herself before Mary on a painting from Narga Selassie, 1748

Mentewab's attempt to strengthen ties between the monarchy and the Oromo of Wollo by arranging the marriage of her son Iyasu to Wubit, the daughter of an Oromo chieftain from Wollo backfired in the long run. Her attempt to continue her powerful role after the death of her son (1755) into the reign of her grandson Iyoas (r. 1755–1769) brought her into conflict with Wubit (Welete Bersabe), Iyasu's widow, who believed that it was her turn to serve as regent. When Iyoas assumed the throne upon his father's sudden death, the aristocrats of Gondar were stunned to find that he preferred to speak in the Oromo language rather than in Amharic, and favored his mother's Yejju relatives over the Qwarans of his grandmothers family. Iyoas further increased the favour given to the Oromo. On the death of the Ras of Amhara, he attempted to promote his uncle Lubo governor of that province, but the outcry led his adviser Wolde Leul to convince him to change his mind.

The conflict between these two queens led to Mentewab summoning her relatives with their armed supporters from Qwara to Gondar to support her. Wubit responded by summoning her own Oromo relatives and their considerable forces from Wollo. Fearing that the power struggle between the Qwarans and the Wolloyes led by the Emperor's mother Wubit would erupt into an armed conflict, the nobility summoned the powerful Ras Mikael Sehul to mediate between the two camps. He arrived and shrewdly maneuvered to sideline the two queens and their supporters making a bid for power for himself.

Iyaos' reign becomes a narrative of the struggle between the powerful Ras Mikael Sehul and the Oromo relatives of Iyoas. Iyoas effectively had little say, as he inherited an empty Imperial treasury and depended heavily on his Oromo relations. As he increasingly favored Oromo leaders like Fasil, his relations with Mikael Sehul deteriorated. Eventually Mikael Sehul deposed the Emperor Iyoas (7 May 1769). One week later, Mikael Sehul had him killed; although the details of his death are contradictory, the result was clear: for the first time an Emperor had lost his throne in a means other than his own natural death, death in battle or voluntary abdication. From this point forward the Empire devolved ever more openly in the hands of the great nobles and military commanders; because of its effects, Iyoas' assassination is usually regarded as the start of the Era of the Princes.

=== Solomonic succession conflicts (1769–1784) ===
An aged and infirm imperial uncle prince was enthroned as Emperor Yohannes II. Ras Mikael soon had him murdered, and underage Tekle Haymanot II was elevated to the throne. Then Mikael Sehul was defeated in the Three battles of Sarbakusa and the triumvirate of Fasil, Goshu of Amhara and Wand Bewossen of Begemder placed their own emperor on the throne. More emperors followed as these three fell from power and were replaced by other strongmen, who constantly elevated and removed emperors; Tekle Giyorgis is famous for having been elevated to the throne altogether six times and also deposed six times.

Meanwhile, Amha Iyasus, Meridazmach of Shewa (1744–1775), wisely kept out of this endless fighting, devoting his energies to consolidating his kingdom and founding Ankober. This was a practice that his successors followed to the end of the kingdom.

The years from 1771 to 1784 constituted a sort of interregnum or a transition age between two eras – the era of the absolute monarchy and the era of rule by the Were Sheikh rulers of Yeju. Tekle Giyorgis I, whose first reign was from 1779 to 1784, tried to assert all over again some, if not all, of the powers of the monarchy. Unfortunately for him and the dynasty as a whole, he ended up losing everything. Ali I defeated him in early 1784 at a place called Afara Wanat and replaced him with Iyasu III who was a full puppet. Two years later, in 1786, Ali I became Ras bitwadad and with his ascent to power, the Yejju dynasty, or more precisely, the Wara Seh dynasty came into being. Ras Ali I and his remaining Wara Seh family members became Enderases (Regents) of the Ethiopian Empire.

Until the emergence of Dejazmach Kassa Hailu, the future Emperor Tewodros II, power was transferred from Ras Ali I to his brother Ras Aligaz. After the death of Ras Aligaz, Ras Wolde Selassie, hereditary ruler of Enderta and overlord of Tigray, became Enderase of the Empire, briefly taking power away from the Wara Sheh rulers. Upon his death, power was transferred to Ras Aligaz's nephew, Ras Gugsa, who in turn transferred power to his sons Ras Yimam, Ras Mariye and Ras Dori. After the death of Ras Dori, Ras Ali II, a nephew of Ras Gugsa, became Enderase.

=== Wara Seh (Sheikh) rulers (Yejju) (1784–1855) ===
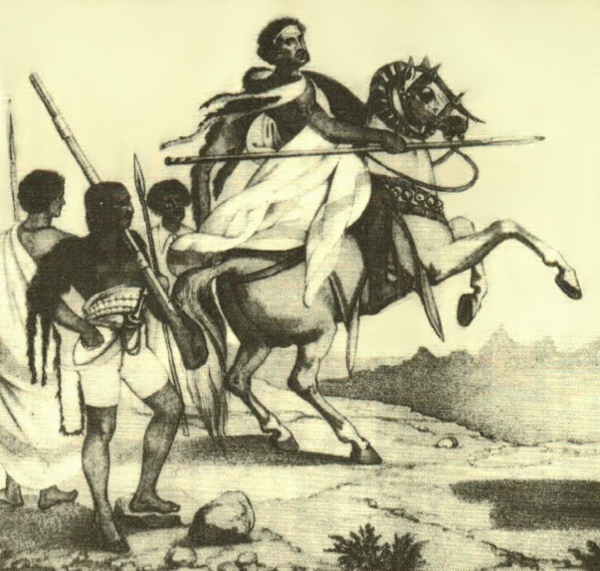
Abyssinian cavalry c. 1770 from German version Zu den Quellen des Blauen Nils of Bruce original work

Crummey, Rubenson, Abir and Shiferaw Bekele agree that despite the weakness of the Emperor, the Yejju lords constituted a stable ruling elite of a multiethnic background that ruled the country in the name of the Solomonic dynasty. That being said, the term that perhaps needs to be precisely defined has to do with the appellation of the Yejju. Very often it is called the Yejju dynasty. There is no problem with this name except that at times it created confusion with the Yejju region of Wollo. It is preferable to call them by the name that they themselves preferred and by what others called them: Wara Sheh or Were Sheikh (sons of the Sheikh) a name which reflects their Muslim background. This appellation clearly refers to the family rather than to the province, and to their Islamic and Oromo roots.

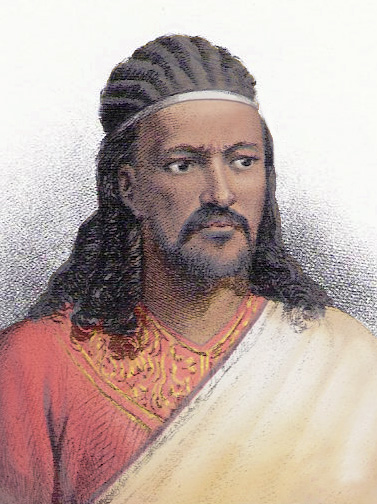
Tewodros II, who brought an end to the Zemene Mesafint

Scholars now agree that of the Wara Sheh rulers, Ras Gugsa's reign (1800–1825) was characterised more by peace than by war. The power of the Wara Sheh rulers was much more than predominance. They exercised actual authority over the other lords. The latter were their tributary lords and the Wara Sheh were suzerains or overlords. To be precise, the Wara Sheh did not exercise absolute authority outside of the provinces directly under their rule. These provinces extended from Begemeder across Chachaho Pass to the Amhara provinces of Maqet, Wadla, Dalanta and Dawent. Their authority over the lords of the rest of the regions – Qwara, Gojjam, Wollo, Semien, Tigray up to Hamasien, Wag and the like – was rather restricted to the power of making them pay regular tributes, be in attendance in their court for a given period of the year, participate in their wars and exercise right of appeal in matters of justice. They also had the right of confirmation in their offices when new lords came to power in one way or another. At times, they even went to the extent of chaining some of their recalcitrant lords.

=== End of the Zemene Mesafint ===
The time period had a lasting demographic impact on Eritrea, with multiple previously predominantly Christian ethnic groups such as the Bilen and Tigre people being Islamised by the Ottoman Empire and later the Eyalet of Egypt due to a weak Ethiopian imperial presence. The Zemene Mesafint, which in a span of eighty-six years saw twenty-three emperors occupy the throne (some were placed on and removed from the throne numerous times) came to an end with the rise of Kassa Hailu – better known by his later throne name of Tewodros II. Kassa won his way to control the imperial throne first by occupying Dembea, then following a series of battles beginning with Gur Amba (1852) and ending with Battle of Derasge (1855), came to control all of northern Ethiopia. More importantly, with his triumph over Ras Ali II at the Battle of Ayshal, Kassa Hailu ended the Were Seh dynasty, and with imperial power once again in the hands of a single man, the Zemene Mesafint is considered to have ended and the history of Modern Ethiopia to have begun.

== See also ==
- Kritarchy
