= Yohannes of Ethiopia =

Yohannes of Ethiopia may refer to:

- Abuna Yohannes, head of the Ethiopian Orthodox Tewahedo Church in the 14th century
- Yohannes I (c. 1640–1682), Emperor of Ethiopia 1667–1682
- Nebahne Yohannes, claimant to the Ethiopian throne 1709–1710
- Yohannes II (1699–1769), Emperor of Ethiopia 1769
- Yohannes III (c. 1797–c. 1873), Emperor of Ethiopia intermittently 1840–1851
- Yohannes IV (1837–1889), Emperor of Ethiopia 1871–1889
