= Mesfin =

Honorary title for princes in the Ethiopian Empire

Mesfin, also Mesafint (Prince / Princes), was the title for the princes of the imperial family in the Ethiopian Empire and the highest dignitaries outside the imperial family.

Particularly in the time from about 1750 until after 1850 the Mesafint had great political importance. This period in the history of Ethiopia, which was characterized by the collapse of the imperial central power, is also called the Zemene Mesafint (Ge'ez: ዘመነ መሳፍንት? zamana masāfint, modern zemene mesāfint, variously translated "Era of Judges," "Era of the Princes," or "Age of Princes"). The Mesafint played a major political and economic role as major landowners and secular dignitaries. Formally subordinate to the Emperor, they ruled the territories subordinated to them practically independently, and played a decisive role in the establishment of the powerless Marionette Emperors, who placed them on the throne according to their own interests, and were often assassinated by the Mesafint.

With the restoration of imperial central power in the second half of the 19th century, the influence of Mesafint declined. The title of Mesfin was reserved for the members of the ruling imperial family
