= Seyon =

Seyon may refer to:

- Amda Seyon (usurper), Emperor of Ethiopia for less than one month in 1707
- Amda Seyon I of Ethiopia, Emperor of Ethiopia (1314–1344), and a member of the Solomonic dynasty
- Amda Seyon II (1487–1494), Emperor of Ethiopia and a member of the Solomonic dynasty
- Egwale Seyon of Ethiopia (died 1818), or Gwalu (ጓሉ), nəgusä nägäst (1801–1818) of Ethiopia, and a member of the Solomonic dynasty
- Yagbe'u Seyon of Ethiopia (1285–1294) Emperor of Ethiopia, and a member of the Solomonic dynasty
- Seyon Gandhi (2015 - Present) Resident of Rocklin, CA
- Seyon (film), a Indian action drama film

== See also ==
- Sons of Yagbe'u Seyon of Ethiopia
