= Fasil Ghebbi =

Fortified royal place of Gondarine period emperors in Ethiopia

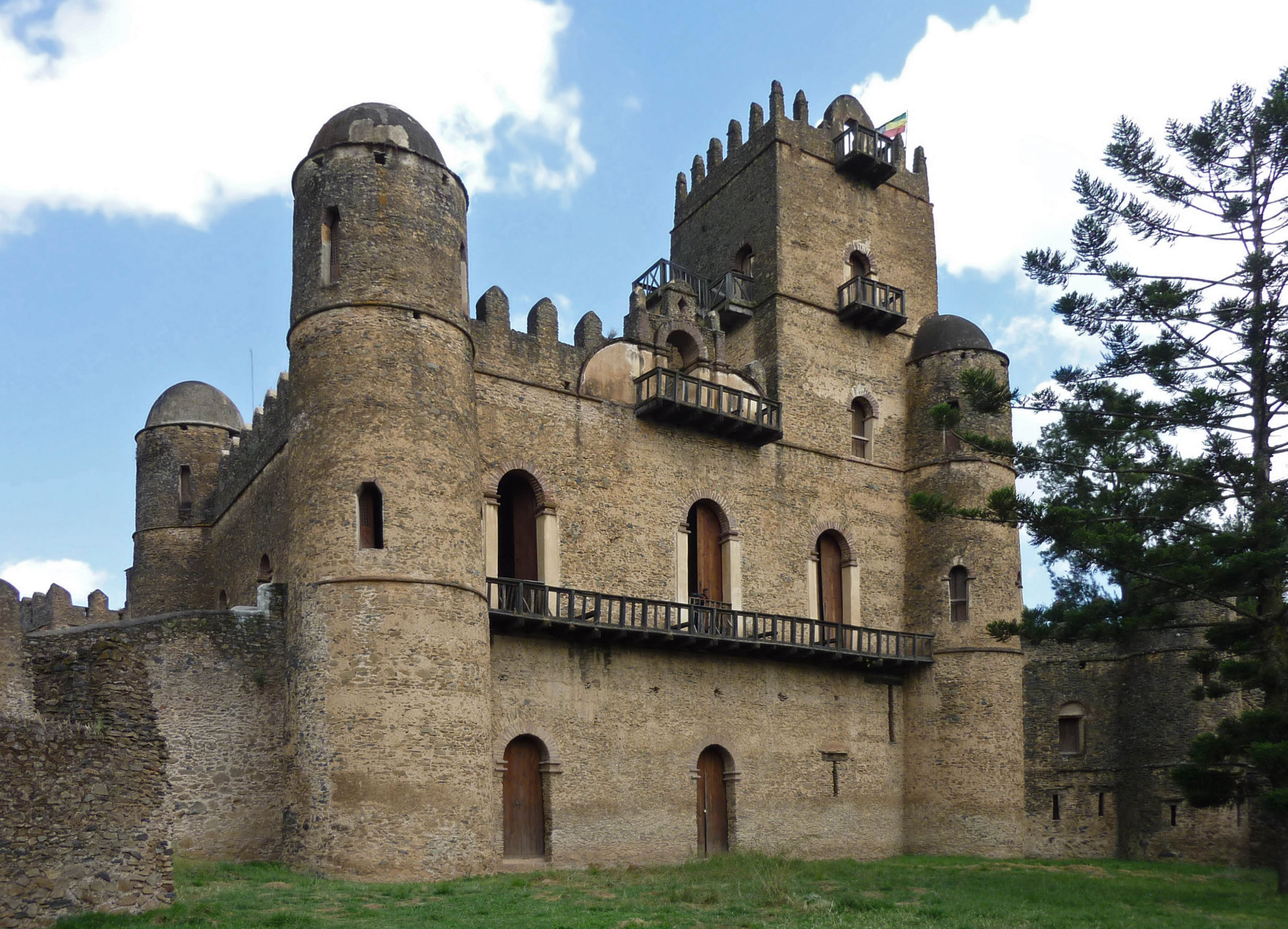
- Emperor Fasilides' castle, founded by him in the 17th century

- Location within Ethiopia
- 12°36′27″N 37°28′12″E
- Location: Gondar, Amhara Region, Ethiopia

History
- Built: 1645
- Built by: Fasilides

UNESCO World Heritage Site
- Official name: Fasil Ghebbi, Gondar Region
- Type: Cultural
- Criteria: (ii), (iii)
- Designated: 1979 (3rd session)
- Reference no.: 19
- Region: Africa

The Fasil Ghebbi (Amharic: ፋሲል ግቢ) is a fortress located in Gondar, Amhara Region, Ethiopia. It was founded in the 17th century by Emperor Fasilides and was the home of Ethiopian emperors. Its unique architecture shows diverse influences including Portuguese, Hindu, and Arab characteristics. Because of its historical importance and architecture, the fortress was inscribed as a UNESCO World Heritage Site in 1979. Ghebbi is an Amharic word for a compound or enclosure.

The complex of buildings includes Fasilides' castle, Iyasu I's palace, Dawit III's Hall, Empress Mentewab's castle, a chancellery and library from Yohannes I, a banqueting hall from the emperor Bakaffa, stables, and three churches: Asasame Qeddus Mikael, Elfign Giyorgis and Gemjabet Mariyam.

In 2025, the Fasil Ghebbi underwent preservation efforts.

== History ==
The origins of the Fasil Ghebbi is preceded by old tradition of Ethiopian emperors traveling around their possessions, living off the produce of the peasants and dwelling in tents. Reflecting this connection, this precinct was frequently referred to as a katama ("camp" or "fortified settlement") or makkababya, the name applied to the imperial camp in the Royal Chronicle of Baeda Maryam. Emperor Fasilides broke with this tradition of progressing through the territories, and founded the city of Gondar as his capital; its relative permanence makes the city historically important. Within the capital, Fasilides ordered the construction of an imposing edifice, the Fasil Ghebbi or Fasilides castle. Subsequent emperors such as Yohannes I, Iyasu I and Dawit III built their own structures in the same imperial compound, expanding the enclosure considerably. The buildings were of brown basalt with ornament of local wine-coloured tuff. The palaces had a fortress-like appearance and were often embellished by paintings and illuminated manuscripts, which were usually made for the churches and nobles.

According to a Yemeni ambassador, Hassan ibn Ahmad al-Haymi who visited the palace in 1648 when it was only a few years old, the architect behind the edifice of Fasilides was an Indian named Abdal Kerim who had previously worked on the palace of Emperor Susenyos I at Danqaz. The Royal Chronicles report that the edifices of Yohannes I and Iyasu I where built by an Ethiopian architect named Walda Giyorgis, who was described as "able, intelligent, and of good renown." The manual labor was primarily supplied by the local Ethiopian Jews (Beta Israel), particularly the Kayla clan who traditionally worked as masons, metalsmiths and carpenters, occupations seen in low repute by the general population.

Al-Haymi, who was greatly impressed with the palace, describes it as a great house of stone and lime and "one of marvellous of buildings, worthy of admiration, and the most beautiful of outstanding wonders." The palace served as the residence of the royal family; an Armenian in Ethiopian imperial service, named Khoja Murad, visited the imperial palace in 1696 and claimed that they were at least 80 royal children who "ran around indiscriminately". Visiting the Fasil Ghebbi in the late 1950s, Thomas Pakenham observed that "dotted among the palaces are what remains of the pavilions and kiosks of the imperial city".

A large number of the buildings at Fasil Ghebbi did not survive the events of the time, but the place is still rich in buildings that were renovated both by the Italian occupiers in the late 1930s and after Ethiopia regained its independence. The site was declared a World Heritage Site by UNESCO in 1979, which stated in its decision that it faithfully represents modern Ethiopian civilization at north of Lake Tana which appeared in the early 17th century and influenced Ethiopian architecture for many years. Fasil Ghebbi also includes the Fasilides Baths, a construction which is also attributed to Emperor Fasilides, and the Imperial Complex of Empress Mentewab in Kuskam, which is considered one of the most important tourist destinations in the country.

== Description ==
Fasil Ghebbi covers an area of about 70,000 square metres (750,000 sq ft). To its south lies Adababay, the marketplace of the city of Gondar, where imperial proclamations were made, troops presented, and criminals executed; it is currently a city park.

Dawit's Hall is in the northern part of the enclosure, adjacent to the building attributed to Bakaffa and the church of Asasame Qeddus Mikael. Often referred to as the "House of Song", Stuart Munro-Hay notes that this may be due to a misreading of the Amharic zofan bet ("House of the Divan" or "House of the Throne") as zafan bet ("House of Song"). Munro-Hay describes it as a "substantial one-storey building with a round tower at the south-east corner", with traces of a smaller round tower at the northeast corner and traces of a square tower at the northwest corner "most of which has collapsed." The interior of the building is a single long hall, which "the usual arched windows and doorways provided light and access". As of 2002, Dawit's Hall lacks a roof.

Fasil Ghebbi is enclosed by a 900-metre-long (3,000 ft) curtain wall which is pierced by twelve gates. These are, in counter-clockwise order: Fit Ber (also called Jan Tekle Ber) opening onto Adababay; Wember Ber (Gate of the Judges); Tazkaro Ber (Gate of Funeral Commemoration), which had a bridge destroyed by fighting during the reign of Iyasu II; Azaj Tequre Ber (Gate of Azaj Tequre), which once was connected by a bridge to Adababay Tekle Haymanot church; Adenager Ber (Gate of the Spinners), which was linked by a bridge to Qeddus Rafael church in the weaver's section of Gondar; Qwali Ber (Gate of the Queen's Attendants), next to the modern entrance to Elfin Giyorgis church inside the Enclosure; Imbilta Ber (Gate of the Musicians); Elfign Ber (Gate of the Privy Chamber), which gave access to the private apartments of the Fasil Ghebbi; Balderas Ber (Gate of the Commander of the Cavalry); Ras Ber (Gate of the Ras), also known as Qwarenyoch Ber (Gate of the Qwara people); Ergeb Ber (Gate of Pigeons), also known as Kechin Ashawa Ber (Gate of the Gifts); Inqoye Ber (Gate of Princess Inqoye, the mother of Empress Mentewab; and Gimjabet Mariyam Ber (Gate of the Treasury of Mary), which leads to the churchyard of Gimjabet Mariyam church.

== Gallery ==
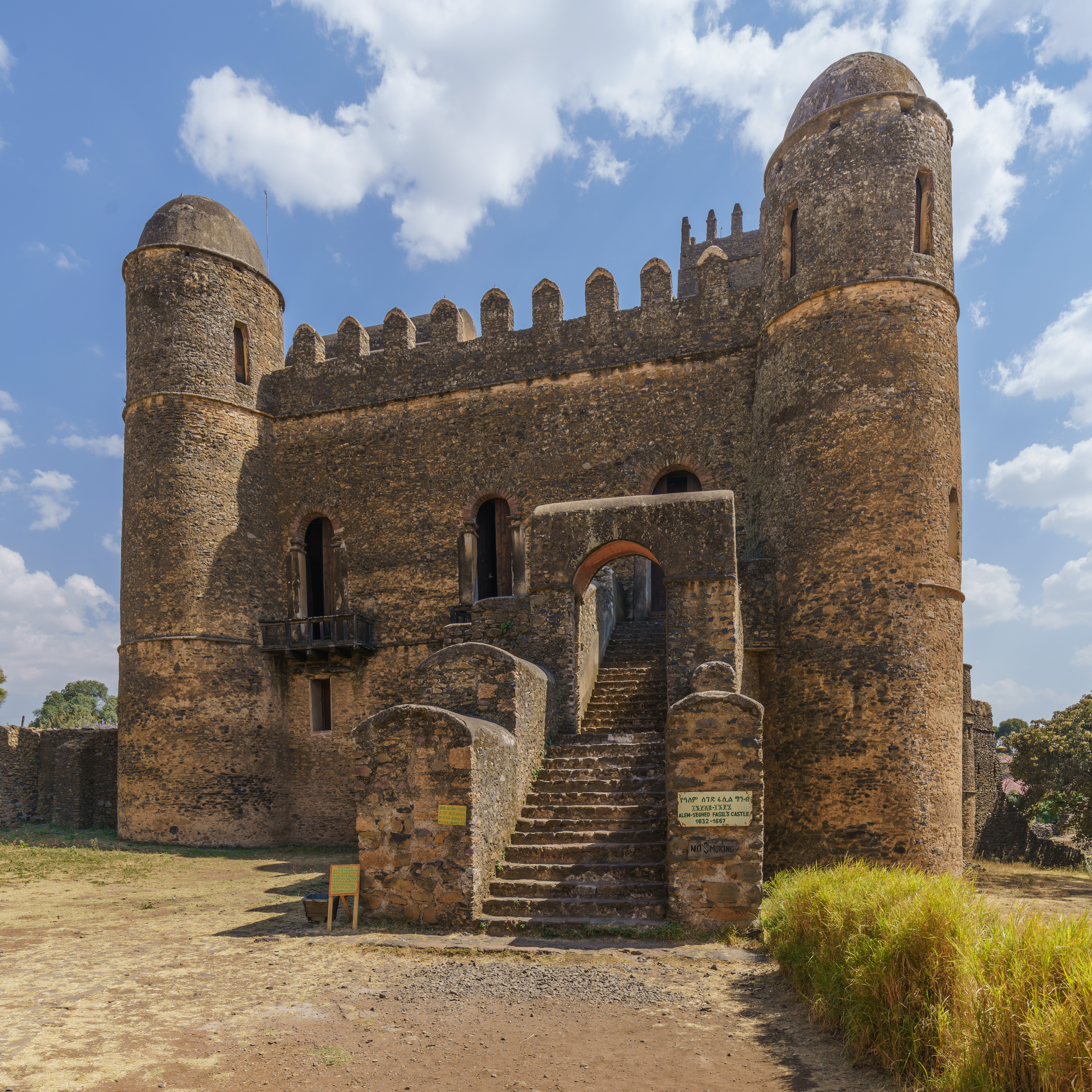
Side entrance to Fasil Gemb

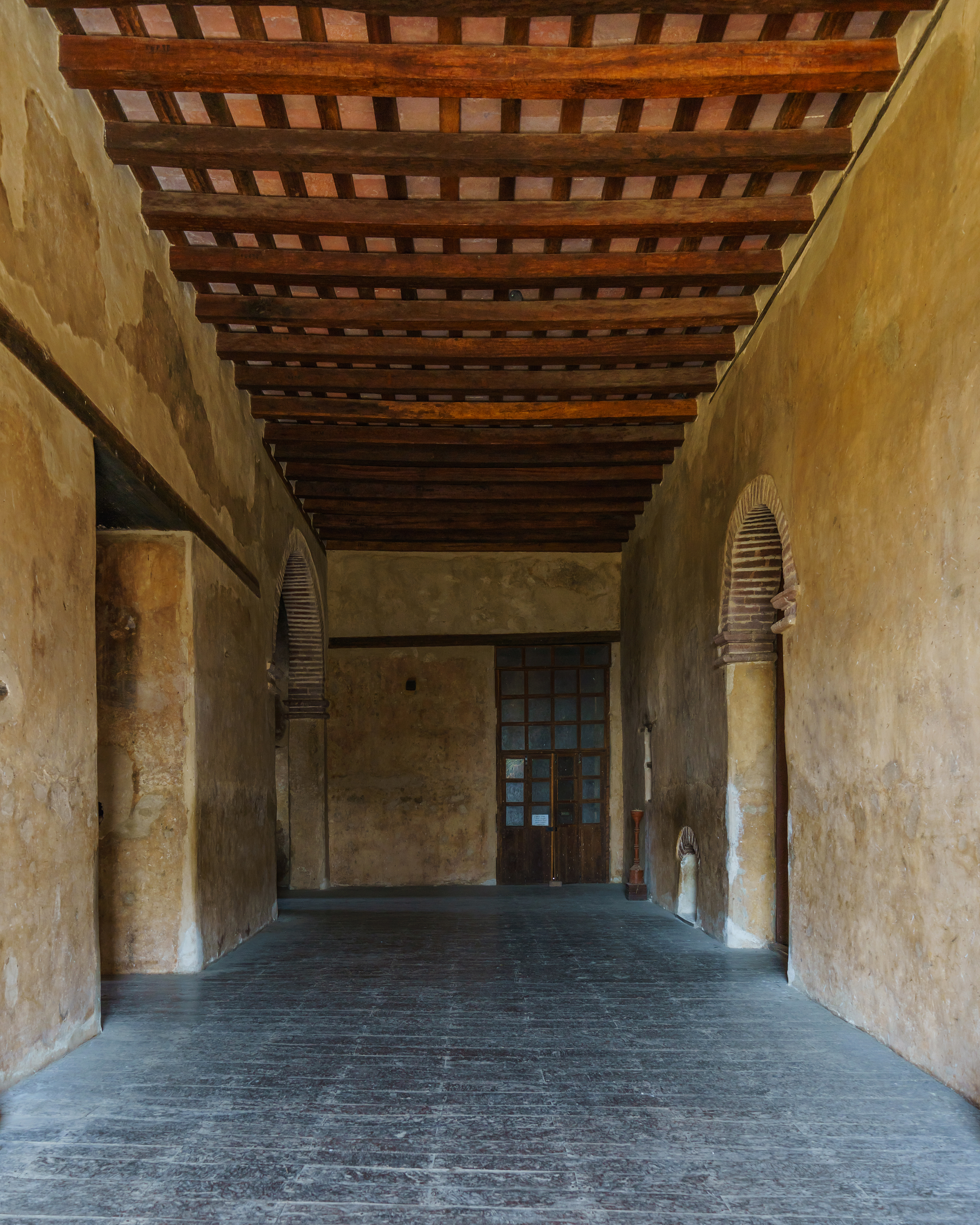
Interior of Fasilides' Palace

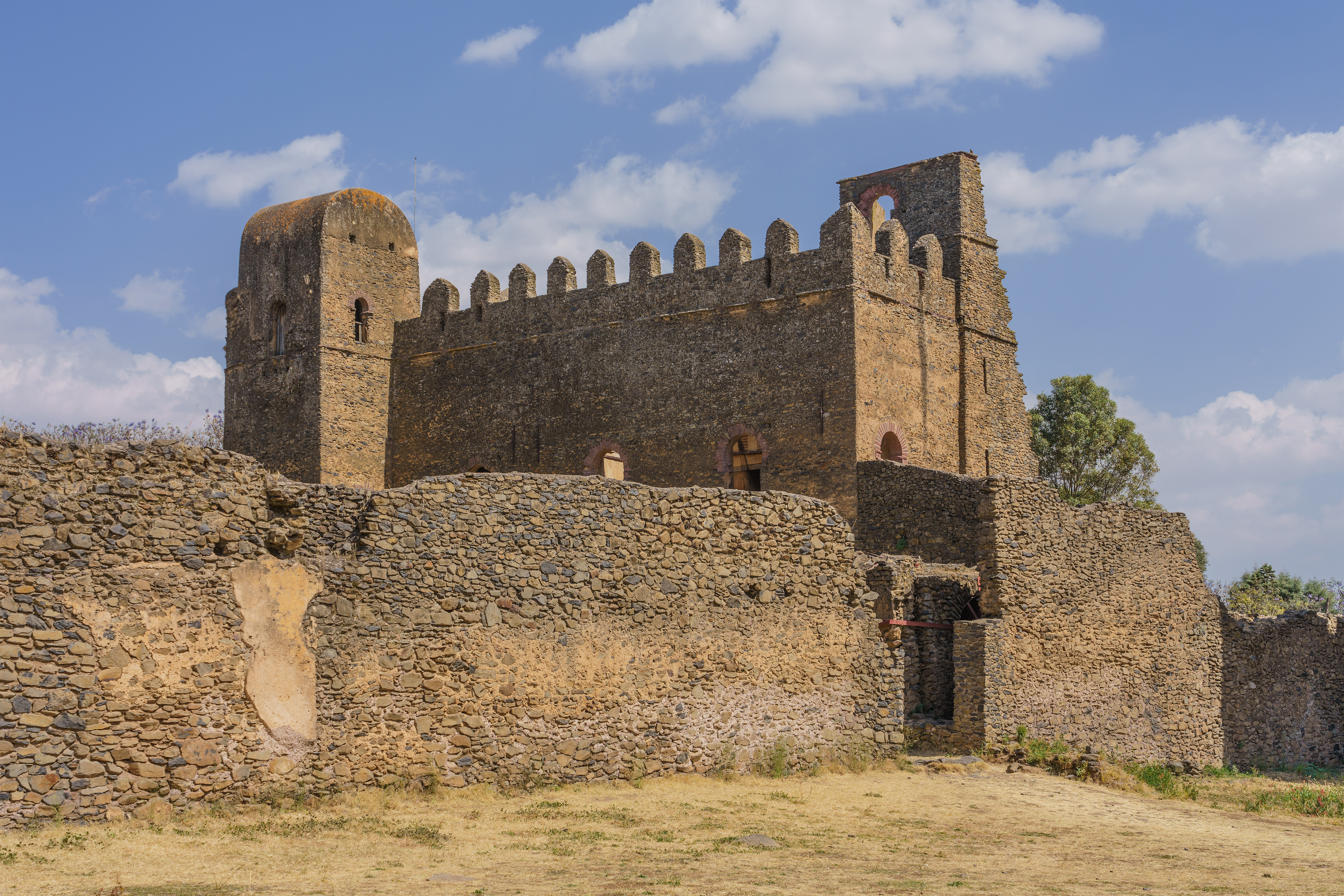
Palace of Iyasu I

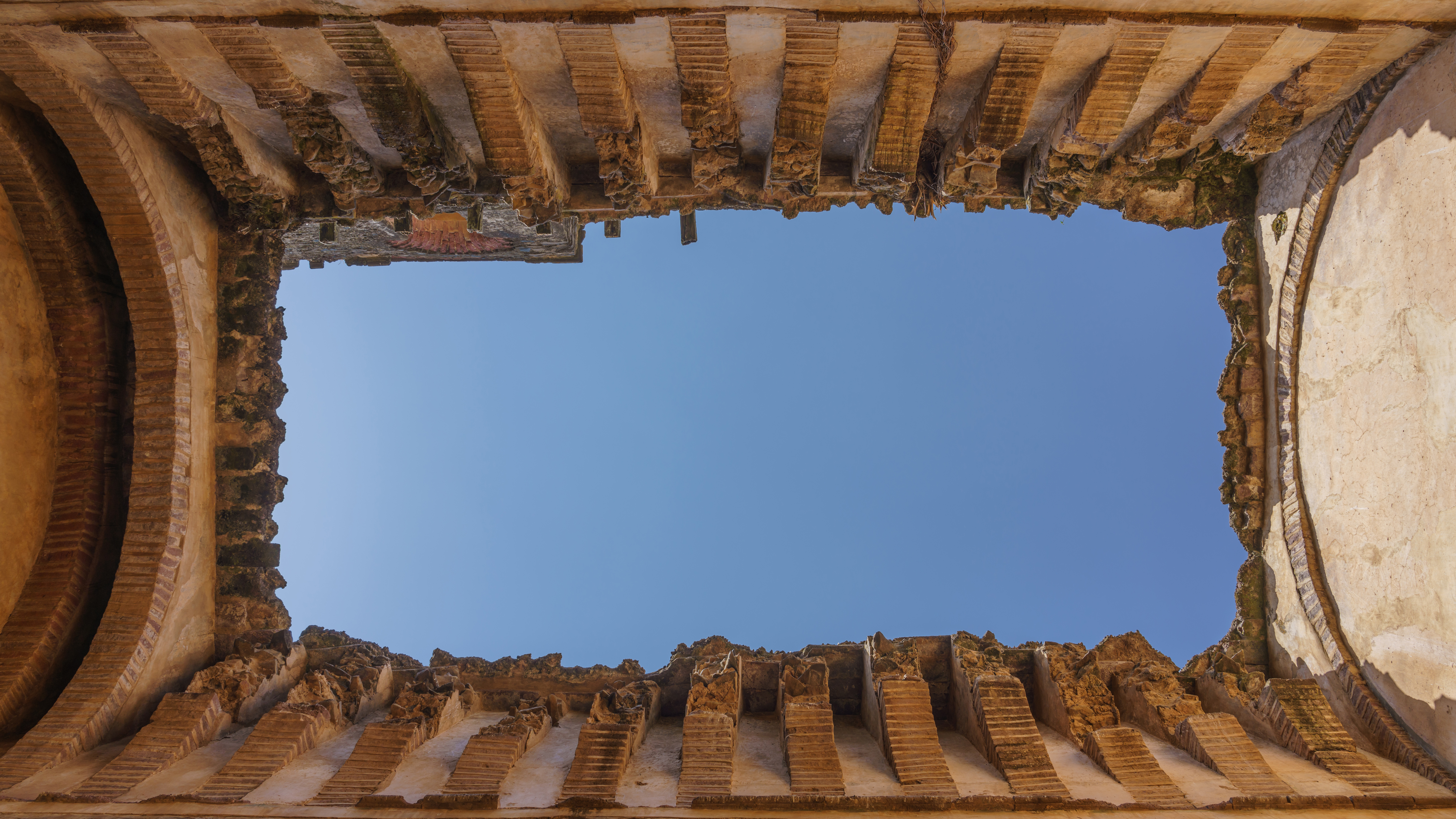
Palace of Iyasu I

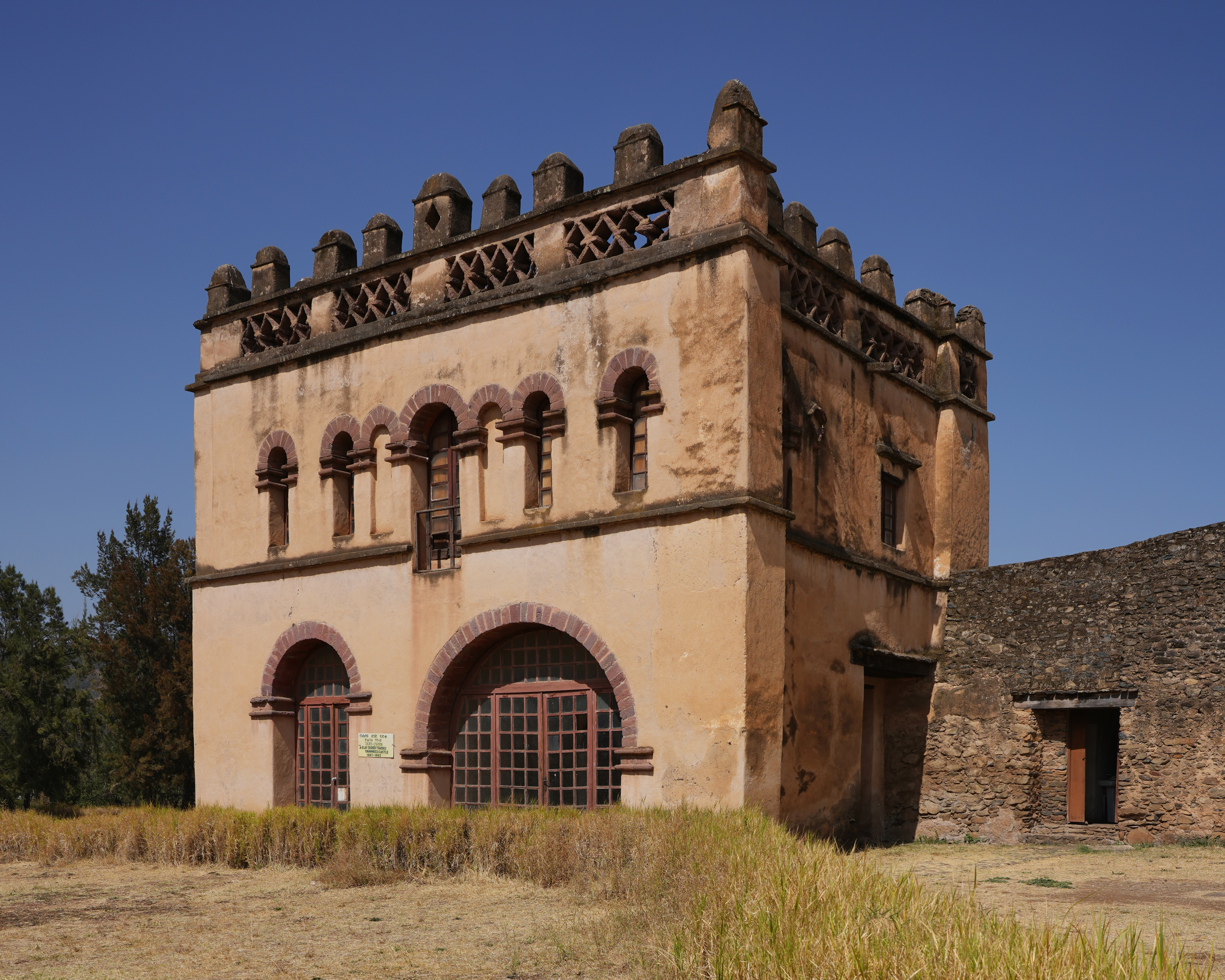
Royal library building

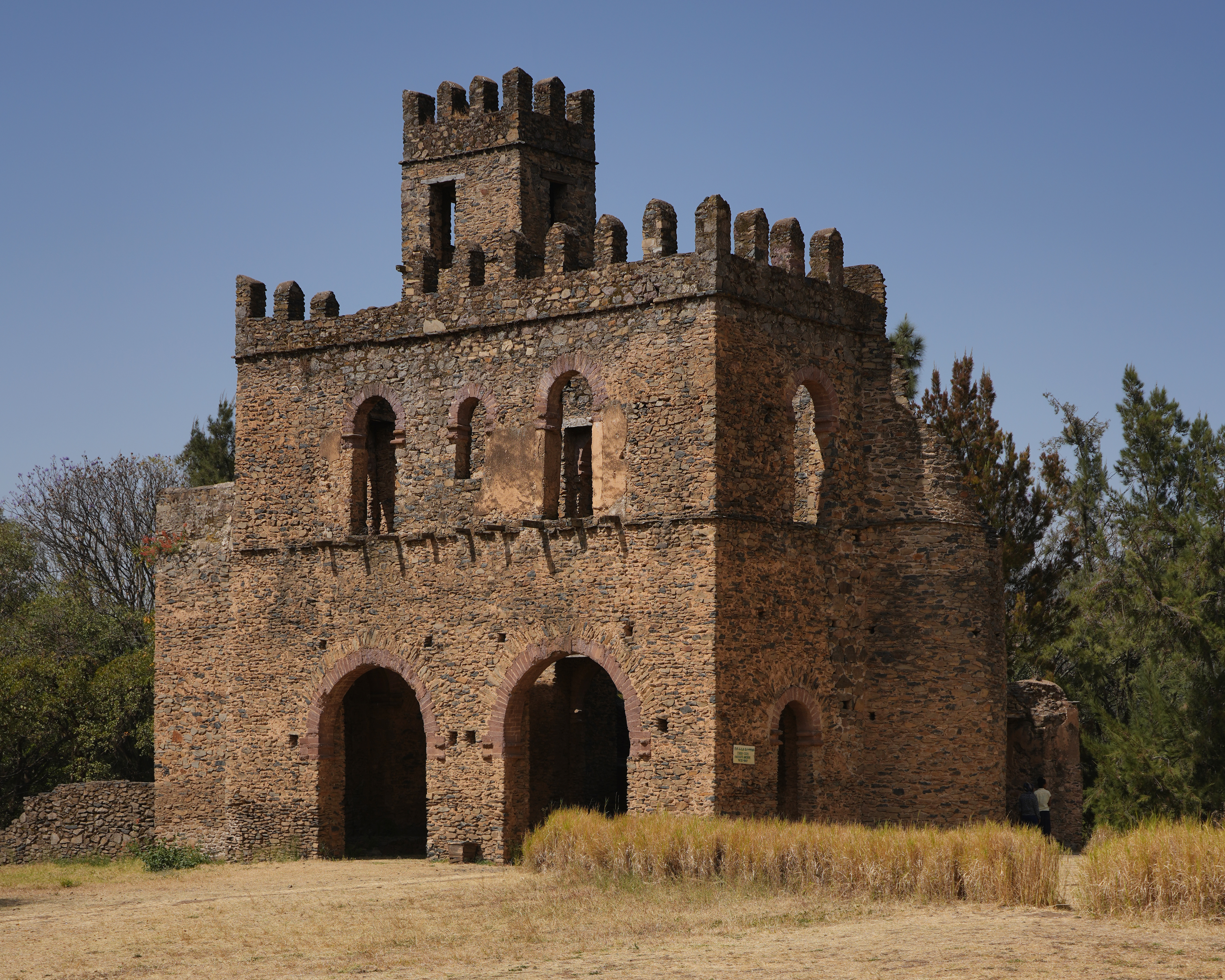
Royal archive building

== See also ==
- List of World Heritage Sites in Ethiopia
