= Battle of Derasge =

1855 battle in Ethiopia

- Part of Zemene Mesafint
Date	9 February 1855
Location	Derasge, Ethiopian Empire (near lake Tana)
Result	Victory for Kassa Hailu; Coronation as Tewodros II

Commanders and leaders
Wube Haile Maryam	Kassa Hailu

The Battle of Derasge was fought on 9 February 1855 between Kassa Hailu's forces and the forces of Wube Haile Maryam, Dejazmatch of Tigray. Kassa won the battle, and two days later was crowned Tewodros II of Ethiopia at the church of Derasge Mariam near Mekane Berhan.

== See also ==
- Battle of Gur Amba
