= Yohannes II =

Emperor of Ethiopia in 1769

Emperor of Ethiopia
- Reign: 7 May – 18 October 1769
- Predecessor: Iyoas I
- Successor: Tekle Haymanot II
- Born: 1699
- Died: 18 October 1769 (aged 69–70); Gondar, Amhara Province, Ethiopian Empire
- Spouse: Waletta Selassie
- Dynasty: House of Solomon
- Father: Iyasu I
- Mother: Qeddesta Krestos
- Religion: Ethiopian Orthodox Tewahedo

Yohannes II (Ge'ez: ዳግማዊ ዮሐንስ; 1699 – 18 October 1769) was Emperor of Ethiopia, and a member of the Solomonic dynasty. He was the son of Iyasu I, and brother of Emperors Tekle Haymanot I, Dawit III, and Bakaffa. During his brief reign of a little longer than five months, little of note happened. There are conflicting accounts of his death.

== Reign ==
There are two versions of his reign and life: one that follows the history provided by James Bruce in his Travels to Discover the Source of the Nile, the other based on other contemporary records as assembled by Shiferaw Bekele in a 2002 article.

== Bruce's version ==
According to Bruce, during the reign of Yohannes' brother Bakaffa (1721-1730), the Emperor had vanished from view and a rumor circulated that Bakaffa had died. Qegnazmach Giyorgis acted on this by bringing Yohannes down from the royal prison on Wehni to rule, but before Yohannes could be proclaimed emperor, Bakaffa revealed himself and ordered the two men punished for their presumption, Giyorgis with death and Yohannes by having his hand cut off. However, in his edition of Bruce's work Alexander Murray replaced Bruce's words with a summary of the Royal Chronicle, which records Yohannes had lost his hand for escaping from Wehni prior to this event, and instead, along with the other royal prisoners of Wehni, had refused to descend and be made Emperor. In either case, Yohannes did not become emperor during the 1720s or 1730s.

Then, later, following the murder of Iyoas I in 1769, Ras Mikael Sehul summoned the late Emperor's great-uncle, Yohannes, from Wehni, although Yohannes must then have been in his seventies at least, and presented him to the royal council as his choice for Emperor. When one of the council pointed out that Yohannes lacked one of his hands (it had been cut off in punishment for attempting to escape from Wehni), Mikael replied that if Yohannes needed help mounting his horse, he himself would help Yohannes.

Mikael married Yohannes to Mikael's own young granddaughter, Waletta Selassie.

Yohannes' reign is succinctly recounted by E. A. Wallis Budge:

John hated all military matters, and refused to march with the army, and after hiding himself begged Michael to send him back to Wahni. Michael was bound to march with his troops, but seeing it would be fatal for his plans to leave a king like John in Gondar, he had him poisoned one morning at breakfast time.

This account has been accepted by most historians of Ethiopia.

== Shiferaw Bekele's account ==
Shiferaw begins by fixing the details of Yohannes' birth; for the most part, his account of this part of his life agrees with Bruce's. This he does by relying on two Ethiopian histories, the Short Chronicle and the Chronicle of Iyasu I. He determines that Yohannes was the son of Iyasu I and his favorite concubine, Qeddesta Krestos, who died in 1705. As the second son, Shiferaw determines that Yohannes was born in either 1696 or 1697, which would make him 72/73 when he came to the throne. "Hence," Shiferaw concludes, "Bruce was very close to accuracy (as much as one could be in these things) when he estimated his age at the time of enthronement to be 'past seventy years'." There is a record of Yohannes being summoned from Wehni at the beginning of the reign of his brother Bakaffa, when that monarch fell seriously sick; Yohannes is described as Bakaffa's "favorite" by the chronicler. When Bakaffa recovered, Yohannes was returned to that mountain prison, and no more is heard of him until 1769.

Shiferaw provides several details of the relationship between Bakaffa and Yohannes which throw doubt on the story of Yohannes' amputation. Most importantly is that the Royal Chronicle of Bakaffa's reign lacks any mention of such an act, which "is not bashful about the people the king mercilessly slaughtered let alone those he amputated." This leads to the question where did this story of amputation come from? Shiferaw admits he cannot provide an answer. "It is not very easy to give a conclusive answer to this question until a thorough textual study [of the primary sources] is done and until the way they were written and when they were written and their authorship is established."

There are two near-contemporary sources that contradict Bruce's account of Yohannes' reign: a contemporary chronicle that has escaped notice of historians, and the researches of Henry Salt. The account of this chronicle agrees with Bruce concerning the accession of Yohannes, only providing the relevant dates: Yohannes arrived at Gondar Tuesday, 9 May, and was crowned emperor the next day. Where it begins to diverge is by stating that Mentewab was separated from her grandson and expelled from the palace before Yohannes arrived. It also provides the detail that Ras Mikael and Yohannes murdered the young Iyoas together and secretly buried him the night of 10/11 May. The next two months were spent in rest and in pleasure until Thursday 4 August. He married Walata Selassie later that month. Then on Tuesday, 26 September Yohannes attended church at the Church of St. Ewostatewos; after returning to the palace, that same day he fell sick. Nineteen days later, Yohannes died of this illness. He was buried at night in the Church Abajale Tekle Haymanot.

Yohannes death from illness is confirmed by Henry Salt, who interviewed the son-in-law of Yohannes. This man states that Yohannes "after a reign of only five months died of disease, not of poison, as stated by Bruce."

Based on this evidence, Shiferaw argues for a natural death for emperor Yohannes, not from poison. He suggests that the story that Yohannes was poisoned by Ras Mikael Sehul due to the circumstances of his burial and lack of a period of mourning; "rumours of poison in the town ... found its way into the ears of Bruce several months later and ultimately into the book."

== Notes ==
Regnal titles
Preceded by Iyoas I	Emperor of Ethiopia; 1769	Succeeded by Tekle Haymanot II
