= Nebahne Yohannes =

Proclaimed Emperor of Ethiopia

Nebahne Yohannes claimed the imperial title nəgusä nägäst "King of Kings" of Ethiopia (1709 – July 1710) during the reign of Emperor Tewoflos.

According to E. A. Wallis Budge, he was supported by Satuni Yohannes (who had been involved in the death of the previous Emperor, Tekle Haymanot I, the nephew of Tewoflos) and Mamo. Nebahne was caught in flight at Ebenat, and after having his nose and ears cut off was set free. However, James Bruce states that Nebahne was supported by Tige, a former Ras Bitwoded, who had been imprisoned in Hamasien but managed to escape to his kindred Oromo where he raised an army. Bruce also writes that the decisive battle was fought at Yebaba on 28 March 1709; although the ultimate fate of Nebahne Yohannes is unknown, Tige and his two sons were killed by a peasant who afterwards presented their heads to Emperor Tewoflos.
