= Kayla (Beta Israel) =

Kayla is one of the names of the Beta Israel (Ethiopian Jewish) community among their traditional neighbours, after which the Kayla dialect is named. Yona Bogale claimed that the name stems from the Tigrinya word for artisans, and on the broader sense excommunicated people (as Yeshaq I of Ethiopia has denied the right of inheritance of all non-Christians). Speakers of Agaw languages, such as Qemant citizens, told researchers that Kayla means "one who has not crossed the stream" or "he or they that have not crossed". This refers to the observance of Shabbat rules among Ethiopian Jews, necessitating the avoidance of activities prohibited on Shabbat.
