= Yostos =

Emperor of Ethiopia from 1711 to 1716

Yostos ዐፄ ዮስጦስ

Emperor of Ethiopia
- Reign: 14 October 1711 – 19 February 1716
- Predecessor: Tewoflos
- Successor: Dawit III
- Died: c. 1716
Regnal name
- Tsehay Sagad
- Dynasty: House of Solomon
- Father: Delba Iyasu
- Mother: Walatta Hawaryat

Yostos (Ge'ez: ዮስጦስ), throne name Tsehay Sagad (Ge'ez: ፀሓይ ሰገድ, died c. 1716), was Emperor of Ethiopia from 14 October 1711 to 19 February 1716, and a member of Solomonic dynasty. After the death of Tewoflos, the nobles chose one of their own as nəgusä nägäst to avoid a cycle of vengeance. Yostos, facing challenges to his authority, remained in Gondar throughout his reign, only venturing out for hunting.

Once the political situation stabilized, he built two churches in Gondar. Yostos faced a conspiracy to depose him but thwarted it, punishing the conspirators. He led a slave-raiding expedition, captured children, and ended the campaign after the death of his confidant. Yostos fell ill in January 1716, withdrew from public life, and unintentionally caused a fire during a fumigation attempt. Amid conflicts over his successor, Dawit III was proclaimed Emperor while Yostos remained alive but forgotten. He was eventually given a proper burial in Lideta church.

== Reign ==
According to James Bruce, he was the son of Delba Iyasu and a daughter of Emperor Iyasu I.

According to E. A. Wallis Budge, his mother was Walatta Hawaryat, daughter of princess Amlakawit and granddaughter of Yohannes I.

Yostos had served as governor of Samien under Emperor Tekle Haymanot, but fell out of favor under Emperor Tewoflos—despite it was Yostos who, immediately after the assassination of Emperor Tekle Haymanot travelled to Mount Wehni and brought Tewoflos down.

According to Richard Pankhurst, on the death of Tewoflos, the chief nobles of Ethiopia feared that the cycle of vengeance that had characterized the reigns of the previous two rulers would continue if a member of the Solomonic dynasty were picked for the throne, so they selected one of their own to be nəgusä nägäst. However Yostos encountered many challenges to his authority, and was forced to remain in the capital of Gondar for his entire reign, leaving the city only to hunt. After a few years, the political situation stabilized enough for him to construct two new churches in Gondar, Lideta Mariyam ("Birth of the Virgin Mary") in 1713, and Abba Antons ("Father Anthony") in 1715.

Bruce notes that Yostos faced a conspiracy to depose him shortly after taking the throne: while he was away from Gondar on a hunt, a group of men he had entrusted his government to had planned to overthrow him. Yostos, with a body of picked men, returned to his capital at night and surprised them sitting in council. His chief minister, Ras Hezekias, and his Master of his Household, Heraclides, along with five others, had their nose and ears cut off then thrown into prison. One of the chief conspirators, Benaia Basile, however managed to escape, having been warned of Yostos' sudden return, but was later caught and punished.

The following year Yostos led a slave-raiding expedition against one of the peoples, once collectively referred to as the Shangalla, who lived along the western border of his kingdom, specifically the people known as the Baasa. These he surprised, slaying the adults and taking their children captive. Yostos had his expedition brought to an end after this first predation when the death of his confidant Ras Fasa Krestos.

In January 1716 Yostos grew ill, and according to his Royal Chronicles withdrew from public life. Bruce provides more information: while supervising the work on the Abba Antons church Yostos "was taken suddenly ill, and, suspecting some unwholesomeness or witchcraft in his palace, ordered his tent to be pitched without the town until his apartments should be smoked with gunpowder." However, the fumigation accidentally burned down part of the palace, which was seen as a "very bad omen". Yostos, still unwell, took up residence in another part of the Royal Enclosure, but fear that he would make his son Fasil heir to the throne led to a battle between his courtiers (who wanted the ailing Emperor to proclaim an heir) and the Imperial Guard (who were loyal to the Solomonic dynasty). Victorious, the Imperial Guard proclaimed Dawit III emperor on 30 January. Meanwhile, Emperor Yostos was still alive in the palace, forgotten in his sick bed until his death. He was given a respectful burial in Lideta church.

Regnal titles
Preceded by Tewoflos	Emperor of Ethiopia; 1711–1716	Succeeded by Dawit III
