= Qwara Province =

Former province in Ethiopia

Coordinates: 12.2500°N 35.8576°E

Qwara (Amharic: ቋራ), also spelled Quara, was a province in now Amhara Region, Ethiopia, located between Lake Tana and the frontier inside present-day Sudan, and stretching from Agawmeder in the south as far north as Metemma, and as far west as Wad Madani, Sudan.

== Overview ==
The region contains mostly Amhara and a small Agew community, some speaking the nearly extinct Qemant language, and was formerly inhabited by a substantial number of Qwaragna people, who spoke the Qwara language, and the Beta Israel.

Qwara had political importance at least as early as the reign of Iyoas I, when the Dowager Queen Mentewab relied on her supporters in Qwara to support her against her rival Wubit, the wife of her son the late Emperor Iyasu II. More importantly, it formed part of the territories of the warlord Dejazmach Meru, who had inherited the office of governor of Qwara from his uncle, Qeñazmach Kebte; these territories, known as Ye Meru Qemas (literally, "The mouth of Meru", or "What Meru eats") were inherited by Dejazmach Kinfu. In Qwara, was born Kinfu's relation, Kassa Hailu, who later used Kinfu's relationships in Qwara to build a power base there in his successful effort that made him Emperor "Tewodros the Quaregna" who was born in Qwara. II. The future Emperor made Qwara his base from the Battle of Koso Bar until his victory at the Battle of Gur Amba (27 September 1852), sometimes as a shifta, or outlaw.
