= Amda Seyon (usurper) =

Imperial usurper, self-crowned as Emperor of Ethiopia in 1707

Amda Seyon III
- negusä nägäst

Emperor of Ethiopia (self-crowned)
- Reign: September 1707
- Dynasty: House of Solomon
- Religion: Ethiopian Orthodox Tewahedo

Amda Seyon III was an usurper who self-crowned as Emperor of Ethiopia for less than one month. Amda Seyon was proclaimed negusä nägäst in September 1707 at Yebaba in Gojjam. He made his way to Gondar, where he had himself crowned, and within a short time gained the support of the friends of the late Emperor Iyasu. Emperor Tekle Haymanot quickly returned to the capital that same month, despite the difficulty of travel during the rainy season, and forced the usurper to flee.

According to James Bruce, it was Tekle Haymanot's kinsman and governor of Gojjam, Dirmen, who followed Amda Seyon's army out of Gojjam, then chased them out of Gondar. Dirman closely followed the usurper as Amda Seyon led his followers across the Abay River and back to Ibala, and after blocking Amda Seyon at Faggeta engaged him on the plains of Maitsa. Amda Seyon was killed in the battle, "in the beginning of the engagement, fighting with all of the bravery that could be expected from a man in his circumstances."
