= Tekle Haymanot I =

Emperor of Ethiopia from 1706 to 1708

Tekle Haymanot I ቀዳማዊ ዐፄ ተክለ ሃይማኖት

Emperor of Ethiopia
- Reign: 27 March 1706 – 30 June 1708
- Predecessor: Iyasu I
- Successor: Tewoflos
- Born: 28 March 1684
- Died: 30 June 1708 (aged 24)
- Issue: Na'od
Regnal name
- Le`al Sagad
- Dynasty: House of Solomon
- Father: Iyasu I
- Mother: Melekotawit
- Religion: Ethiopian Orthodox Tewahedo

Tekle Haymanot I (Ge'ez: ተክለ ሃይማኖት), throne name Le`al Sagad (Ge'ez: ለዓለ ሰገድ, 28 March 1684 – 30 June 1708) was Emperor of Ethiopia from 27 March 1706 until his death in 1708, and a member of the Solomonic dynasty. He was the son of Iyasu I and Empress Malakotawit. He is often referred to as "Irgum Tekle Haymanot" meaning "Tekle Haymanot the Cursed".

== Background ==
Tekle Haymanot I was a son of Emperor Iyasu I by one of his concubines named Malakotawit.

Malakotawit was later given the title of Etage or Itege, meaning "Empress", during the reign of her son. She was crowned at Gondar.

Tekle Haymanot I had several half siblings as his father sired with several concubines. His half brothers who ascended the throne were Dawit III, Bakaffa and Yohannes II.

== Reign ==
Tekle Haymanot became Emperor following Iyasus' retirement to an island in Lake Tana. With the support of his mother Empress Malakotawit, some of the officials argued that Iyasu had abdicated, and crowned Tekle Haymanot as nəgusä nägäst in Gondar. This act was not embraced by the entire state, and the resulting civil strife led to Iyasu's murder at the order of his son Tekle Haymanot.

In September, 1707, a rebel in Gojjam declared himself nəgusä nägäst under the name Amda Seyon, and made his way to the capital city, where he had himself crowned. Tekle Haymanot quickly returned to Gondar, despite the difficulty of travel during the rainy season, forced the usurper to flee, and celebrated his triumph. Amda Seyon was later killed in battle in Maitsa. However his unpopularity for having ordered the murder of his widely revered father was profound and he never overcame it. The involvement of his mother Melekotawit, and the acceptance of his position by other members of the dynasty did irreparable harm to the image of the monarchy. His own courtiers plotted against him, and discussions abounded about whether it was worthy to keep such a corrupt dynasty in power.

While travelling in the provinces, Tekle Haymanot was stabbed to death by some of his late father's courtiers.

The band of assassins then attempted to establish Tekle Haymanot's young son, Naod (Note: Naod, born in 1704 was the son of Tekle Haymanot I, the group that was behind his father's assassination tried to install the boy as a puppet king and failed. His great-uncle Tewoflos became Emperor. Naod died in 1722 at Wehni.) on the throne and failed. Tekle Haymanot was buried on the island of Kebran at Lake Tana

Some historians date the beginning of the Ethiopian Zemene Mesafint or "Era of the Princes" (a time of disorder when the power of the monarchy was eclipsed by the power of local warlords) the murder of Iyasu the Great by his son Tekle Haymanot, and the resultant decline in the prestige of the dynasty.

== Notes ==
Regnal titles
Preceded by Iyasu I	Emperor of Ethiopia; 1706–1708	Succeeded by Tewoflos
