= Tewoflos =

Emperor of Ethiopia from 1708 to 1711

Tewoflos ዐፄ ቴዎፍሎስ

Emperor of Ethiopia
- Reign: 1 July 1708 – 14 October 1711
- Predecessor: Tekle Haymanot I
- Successor: Yostos
- Died: 14 October 1711
Regnal name
- Walda Anbasa
- Dynasty: House of Solomon
- Father: Yohannes I
- Religion: Ethiopian Orthodox Tewahedo

Tewoflos (Ge'ez: ቴዎፍሎስ), throne name Walda Anbasa (Ge'ez: ወልደ አንበሳ, died 14 October 1711), was Emperor of Ethiopia from 1 July 1708 to 14 October 1711, and a member of the Solomonic dynasty. He was the brother of Iyasu I, and one of five sons of Yohannes I.

== Reign ==
Following the murder of his nephew Tekle Haymanot I, Tewoflos was brought out of captivity at Mount Wehni and made Emperor. At first he faced a rival in the person of the four-year-old son of his nephew who was supported by the Master of Horse Yohannes and Empress Malakotawit. His nephew's name was Na'od and he was crowned at Emfraz upon the death of Tekle Haymanot I. However, Tewoflos moved quickly by having Yohannes, and several other non-royals accused of aiding in the murder of Tekle Haymanot, arrested then sent into exile.

According to James Bruce, at first he behaved as if he would not seek vengeance on those thought responsible for the death of his brother Iyasu; but this was a deception, and once this party relaxed their guard he acted. He accused his late nephew Emperor Tekle Haymanot of regicide and patricide, and Tekle Haymanot has been known as Irgum ("Cursed") ever since. Empress Malakotawit was publicly hanged, while her two brothers were speared to death; Bruce states that in one afternoon a total of 37 persons were executed. Not long afterwards he decided to move against all regicides, and ordered that all who had taken part in the plot that led to the death of his brother Iyasu I be found and executed.

Tewoflos also initiated the canonization of his brother Iyasu I.

His reign was an unquiet one. In 1709, Nebahne Yohannes was proclaimed nəgusä nägäst in a revolt that lasted until July 1710. Tewoflos also found himself compelled to support the doctrine known as Wold Qib; when the monks of Debre Libanos asked the Emperor why he embraced the belief they opposed, he reportedly told them, "It is not because I hate you, but so that Gojjam will be subject to me."

According to James Bruce, When he arrived at the capital, he was taken ill of a fever, died, and was buried at Tedda, after a reign of three years and three months.

== Notes ==
Regnal titles
Preceded by Tekle Haymanot I	Emperor of Ethiopia; 1708–1711	Succeeded by Yostos
