= Mentewab =

Empress of Ethiopia from 1723 to 1730

Mentewab ምንትዋብ
- Itege
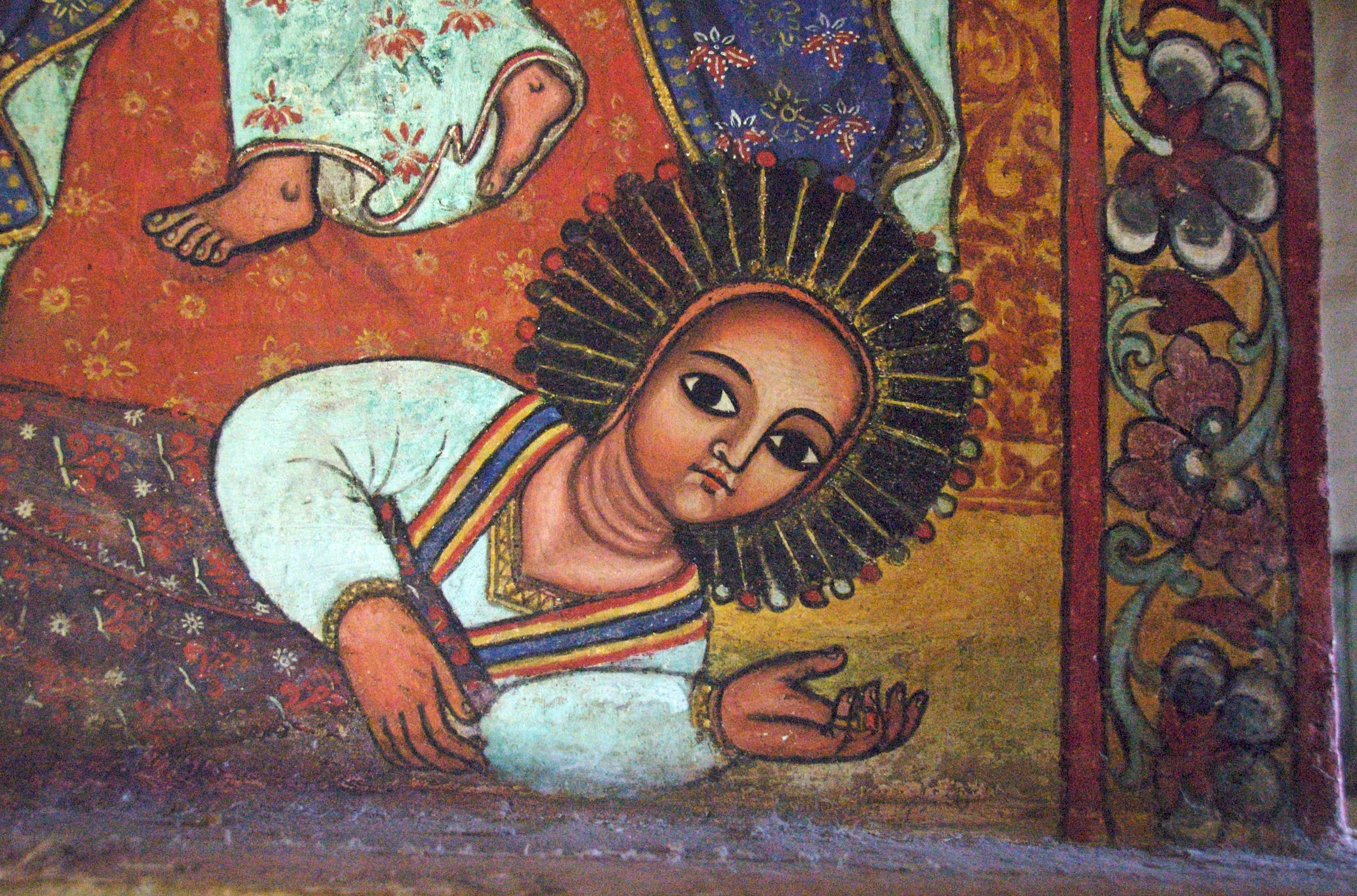
- Itege (Empress) Mentewab lying prostrate at Mary's feet at Nerga Selassie in Lake Tana, 1748.

Empress of Ethiopia
- Tenure: 8 November 1723 – 19 September 1730
- Coronation: 23 December 1730

Regent of the Ethiopian Empire
- Regency: 19 September 1730 – 26 June 1755
- Born: c. 1706; Qwara, Begemder Province, Ethiopian Empire
- Died: 27 June 1773 (aged 66–67); Qwasqwam Palace, Gondar, Begemder Province, Ethiopian Empire
- Burial: Monastery Church of St Mary of Qwasqwam
- Spouse: Bakaffa; Fitawrari "Milmal" Iyasu
- Issue: Iyasu II; Woizero Walatta Takla Haymanot; Woizero Walatta Israel; Woizero Aster; Woizero Altash
Names
- Mentewab (birth name); Walatta Giyorgis (baptismal name); Berhan Mogassa (throne name)
- Dynasty: House of Solomon
- Father: Dejazmatch Manbare of Dembiya
- Mother: Woizero Yenkoy

Mentewab (Ge'ez: ምንትዋብ; c. 1706 – 27 June 1773) was Empress of Ethiopia, consort of Emperor Bakaffa, mother (and regent) of Iyasu II and grandmother of Iyoas I. She was also known officially by her baptismal name of Walatta Giyorgis (Ge'ez: ወለተ ጊዮርጊስ). Mentewab was a major political figure during the reigns of her son the Emperor Iyasu and grandson Iyoas. Empress Mentewab was also known by the honorific of Berhan Mogassa (Ge'ez: ብርሃን ሞገሳ). This was to complement the honorific of her son Iyasu II, who was Berhan Seged.

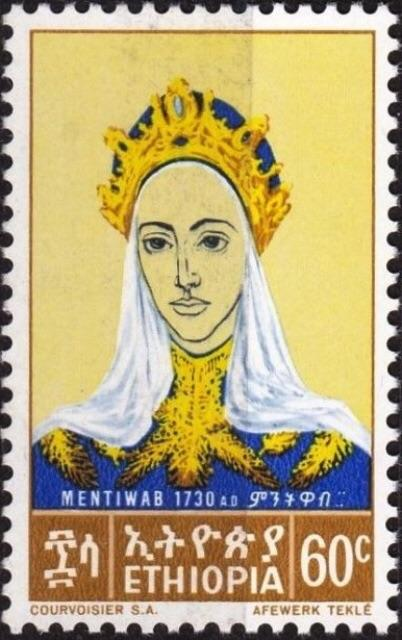
Stamp of Mentewab by Afewerk Tekle

== Life ==
Mentewab was born in Qwara province. She was a daughter of Dejazmach Manbare of Dembiya by his wife, Woizero Yenkoy. Mentewab married Emperor Bakaffa in Qwara on 6 September 1722, becoming his second wife (his first wife having mysteriously died on the day she was crowned, immediately following her coronation banquet).

Following the death of her husband, Empress Mentewab took up a romantic liaison with her late husband's nephew. The Empress' much younger lover was derisively called "Melmal Iyasu" (Iyasu the Kept) by members of the court. Melmal Iyasu on his part was the paternal grandson of Emperor Fasilides by his father and the offspring of Emperor Iyasu (Adyam Seged) by his mother, making him a Solomonic Prince to the highest degree. Mentewab had three daughters by "Melmal Iyasu": Altash, Walata Israel, and the famous Woizero Aster Iyasu who married the powerful Tigrean warlord Ras Mikael Sehul.

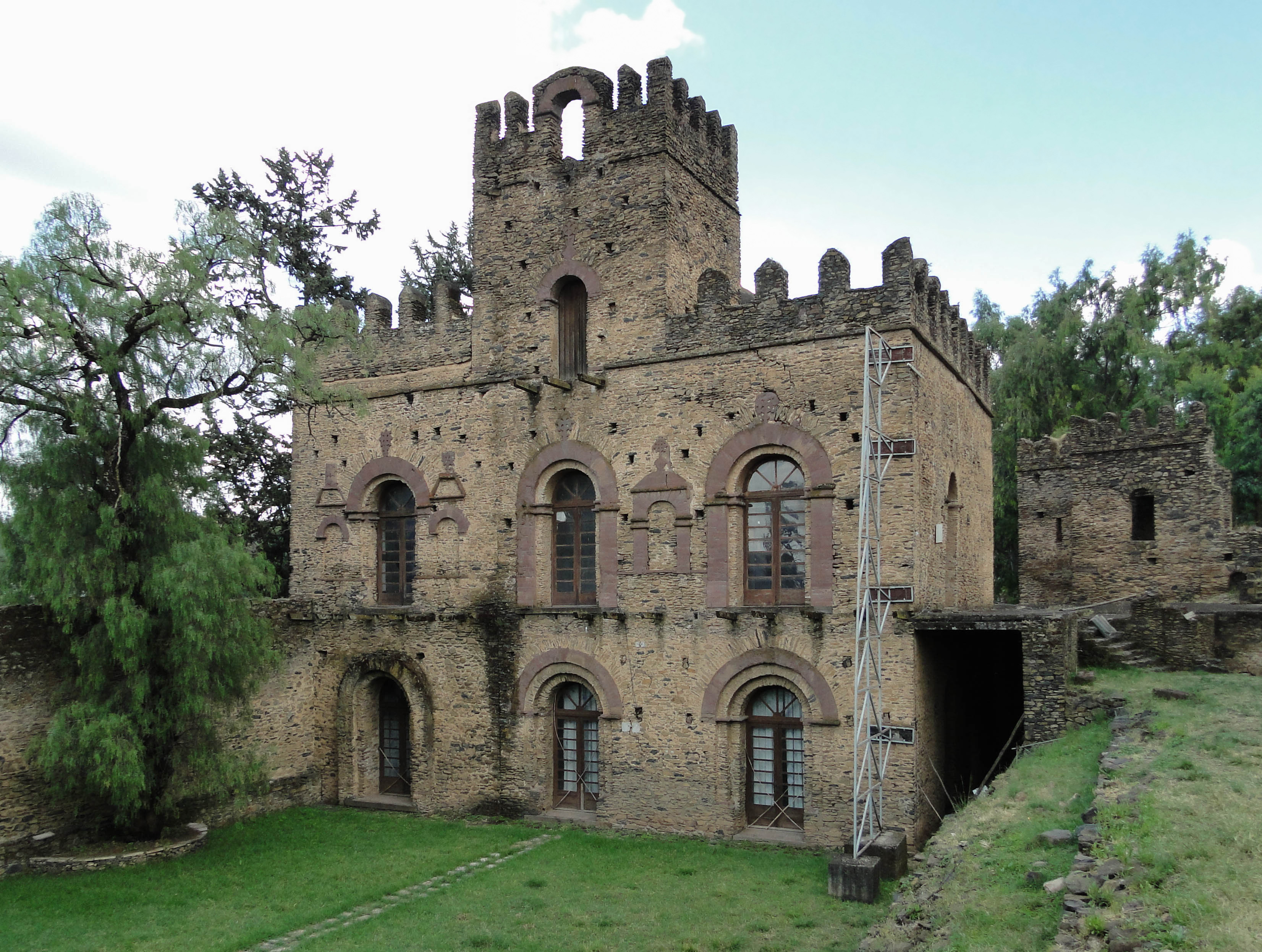
Mentewab's Castle in Fasil Ghebbi, Gondar, Ethiopia

Empress Mentewab built several significant structures in Gondar, including her own castle in the Royal Enclosure, and a large banqueting hall as well. Most significantly she built a church dedicated to the Virgin Mary at Qusquam (named for a site in Egypt where the Holy Family had stayed during their exile) in the mountains outside of Gondar. Empress Mentewab also built a palace adjoining her church, which became her favored residence.

In 1728, Bekkafa developed a severe illness that left him unable to govern, and Mentewab became the unofficial ruler of the kingdom.

Empress Mentewab was crowned co-ruler upon the succession of her son Iyasu II in 1730, and held unprecedented power over government during his reign. (She descended in her own right from emperors who reigned two centuries earlier.) Her attempt to continue in this role following the death of her son 1755 led her into conflict with Wubit (Welete Bersabe), Iyasu's widow, who believed that it was her turn to preside at the court of her own son Iyoas. The conflict between these two queens led to Mentewab summoning her Qwaran relatives and their forces to Gondar for support. Wubit responded by summoning her own Oromo relatives and their considerable forces. Mentewab summoned the powerful Mikael Sehul (who was to become her son-in-law) to mediate the dispute and prevent a bloodbath. Upon arriving in Gondar, he was made Ras. Mentewab had hoped that he would land firmly on her side, but instead Ras Mikael seized power for himself, and eventually engineered the murder by strangulation of Emperor Iyoas I, at which time Mikael also married the aunt of his victim.

Empress Mentewab was distraught at the murder of her grandson. She retreated to Qusquam and buried her grandson there next to her son, and refused to return to the city of Gondar. She lived at her palace there in seclusion till the end of her life.

== Children and genealogy ==
Children by Emperor Bakaffa:

- Abetohun Agaldem Iyasu, succeeded as Iyasu II
- Woizero Walatta Takla Haymanot, married 1730, Ras Ilyas

Children by Fitawrari Iyasu Milmal:

- Woizero Walatta Israel, married (first) Dejazmach Yosadiq Wolde Habib (d. 28 July 1759), sometime Governor of Gojjam, son of Dejazmach Wolde Habib bin Ibido, sometime Governor of Gojjam; married (second) Ras Goshu Wodago, sometime Governor of Amhara and Viceroy of the Empire, son of Ras Wodago, sometime Governor of Amhara, Walaqa, Begameder, and Gojjam, by his wife, Woizero Surantiya, of Ambassel, a descendant of Abeto Yitbarek, son of Emperor Na'od and brother of Emperor Lebna Dengel.
- Woizero Aster, married (first) c. 1755, Dejazmatch Natcho (d. before 1760), of Chirkin, by whom she had one son; married (second) 1760, Ras Ya Mariam Bariaw (killed before 9 December 1769), Viceroy of the Empire, and Governor of Lasta and Begameder 1764-1768, son of Dejazmach Ayo, sometime Governor of Begemder; married (third) 1769, Ras Mikael Sehul Hezqiyas, sometime Viceroy of the Empire.
- Woizero Altash (Eleni), married September 2, 1755 Wolde Hayawrat (d. May 22, 1760, Tigray), son of Ras Mikael Sehul Hezqiyas.

Emperor Menas	Itege Admas Mogassa
Abetohun Yeshaq, later Emperor Sarsa Dengel	Abetohun Za Hawaryat	Abetohun Walda Hawaryat	Abetohun Fiqtor	Woizero Marata Wangel of Bad
Za Krestos Sarsa	Woizero Nassahit	Wagshum Gabra Seyum of Lasta and Semien	?
Abeto La'eka Maryam of Genaza	Woizero Walatta Maryam
Abeto Za Selassie of Walaqa	Woizero Keddeste Kristos
Azzaz Damo	Woizero Krestosawit
Abeto Waksos of Bula	Woizero Yolyana
Dejazmatch Manbare of Dembiya	Woizero Yenkoy
Mentewab
