= Iyasu II =

Emperor of Ethiopia from 1730 to 1755

Iyasu II ዳግማዊ ዐፄ ኢያሱ
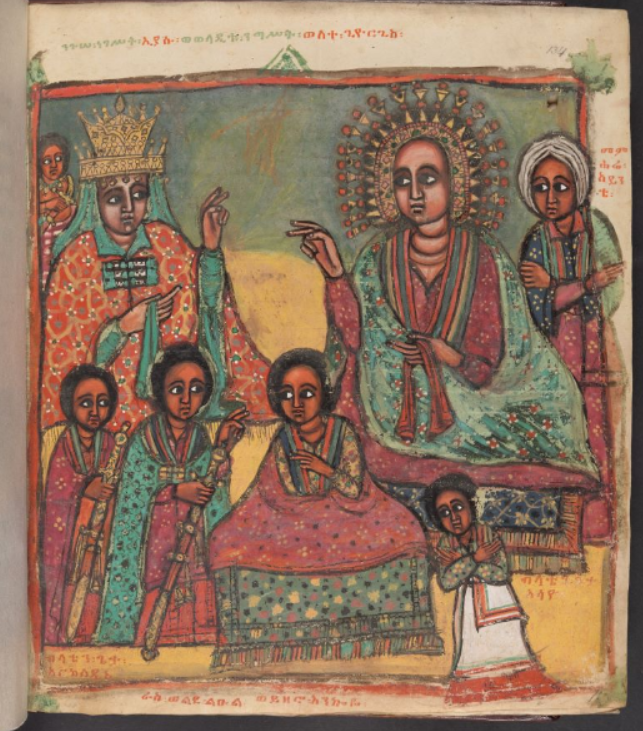
- Depiction of the court of Iyasu II (left) in an 18th-century manuscript

Emperor of Ethiopia
- Reign: 19 September 1730 – 27 June 1755
- Coronation: 19 September 1730
- Predecessor: Bakaffa
- Successor: Iyoas I
- Regent: Mentewab (1723–30)
- Born: 21 October 1723
- Died: 27 June 1755 (aged 31)
- Burial: Debretsehay Kuskuam, Gondar, Ethiopia
- Spouse: Woman from Amhara(first wife); Webit (Walatta Bersabeh) of Karrayyu (second wife)
- Issue: Adigo (by first wife); Aylo (by first wife); Iyoas I (by second wife)
- House: House of Solomon
- Father: Bakaffa
- Mother: Mentewab
- Religion: Coptic Orthodox

Iyasu II (Ge'ez: ኢያሱ; 21 October 1723 – 27 June 1755), throne name Alem Sagad (Ge'ez: ዓለም ሰገድ), was Emperor of Ethiopia from 1730 to 1755, and a member of the Solomonic dynasty. He was the son of Emperor Bakaffa and Empress Mentewab (also known by her baptismal name of Walatta Giyorgis).

The Empress Mentewab played a major role in Iyasu's reign, perhaps against her will. Shortly after he was proclaimed Emperor, a rival claimant assaulted the Royal Enclosure for eight days, only leaving the capital Gondar when an army of 30,000 from Gojjam appeared. Although the rebels failed to penetrate its walls, much of Gondar was left in ruins. Instead of taking the title of regent upon the succession of her underage son, Empress Mentewab had herself crowned as co-ruler, becoming the first woman to be crowned in this manner in Ethiopian history. Empress Mentewab wielded significant authority throughout the reign of her son, and well into the reign of her grandson as well.

== Ancestry ==
Of Amhara descent, Iyasu II was only son of Emperor Bakaffa and Mentewab.

Iyasu had two sisters, one married Takle of Tigray, another married Ras Elias of Begemder.

== Reign ==
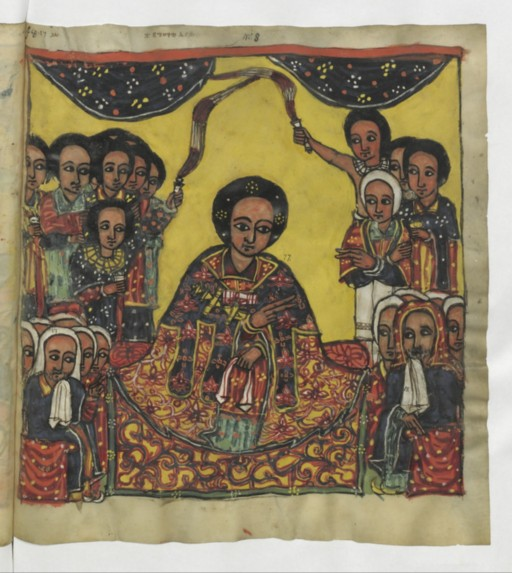
Iyasu with his court

During Iyasu II's reign, a Czech Franciscan named Remedius Prutky visited his kingdom, and engaged Iyasu in talks about religion and European politics. Although he and his two companions were popular because of their medical skills, after a year Prutky and his Catholic companion were asked to leave because of complaints from the local clergy.

Despite Mentewab's counsel, Iyasu proved to be an ineffectual monarch. Frequently, Iyasu engaged in hunting expeditions, near Sennar, bringing game such as wild buffaloes, rhinoceroses, and elephants. According to Paul Henze, Iyasu "came under criticism for devoting too much time to pleasure (he loved hunting) and for spending too many resources on embellishing the capital, paying foreign workmen, and importing luxury goods, ornaments and mirrors from Europe." Prutky, on the other hand blamed Iyasu's constrained revenues to the actions of his mother Mentewab: "Since the youthful emperor Jasu had only reached the age of eight when he ascended the throne, his mother the Queen divided out the provinces among the chief ministers in such a way that, at the time of my sojourn there, the Emperor, now over thirty years of age, saw his treasury diminished and scarcely enough for his ordinary expenses." Prutky adds that during the year he was in Ethiopia (1752), the emperor was engaged in a struggle with his own sister over the revenues from Gojjam.

In a bid to gain the respect of his subjects, the Emperor Iyasu engaged in a campaign against the Kingdom of Sennar, which ended in defeat at the Battle of the Dindar River in 1738; an icon of Christ and a piece of the True Cross carried into battle were captured, and had to be ransomed for 8,000 ounces of gold. This defeat decisively ended any hope by Iyasu to prove himself competent in military affairs; as Donald Levine writes, "The subsequent subdual of Lasta, a rebel region for generations, and Iyasu's raids against tribes in the Atbara district were not sufficient to redeem that defeat or restore the force of Gondar."

During his reign two infestations of locusts afflicted the land, and an epidemic took the lives of thousands. When Abuna Krestodolos died, the treasury lacked money to pay for procurement of a new abuna. According to Edward Ullendorff, Iyasu's authority "scarcely extended beyond Begemder and Gojjam; Shoa and Lasta acknowledged only a token allegiance, while in the Tigray the long rule of the powerful Ras Mika'el had begun."

Iyasu II also conferred the dignity of Kantiba of the Habab (Nakfa and Sahel areas of present-day Eritrea) to Habtes, of the Bet Asegede family, after the latter came to Gondar to pay homage. As insignias of this appointment Habtes received a negarit, jewellery and other gifts.

Emperor Iyasu also resented deeply the romantic liaison his mother entered into with a young member of the Imperial family. Empress Mentewab became involved with Iyasu, the son of her former sister-in-law Romanework, who was herself the sister of the late Emperor Bakaffa, and on her father's side descended in male line from another cadet line of the Solomonic dynasty. Mentewab's relationship with the much younger nephew of her late husband was considered a great scandal, and the young Prince was derisively referred to as "Melmal Iyasu", or "Iyasu the Kept". The Empress had three daughters by this Melmal Iyasu, one of whom was the beautiful Woizero Aster Iyasu who took Ras Mikael Sehul in 1769 as her third husband. Emperor Iyasu became very attached to his half-sisters, but was deeply resentful of their father. It is said that it was the Emperor himself that ordered the murder of his mother's lover by having him pushed from a cliff top near Lake Tana in 1742.

== Death ==
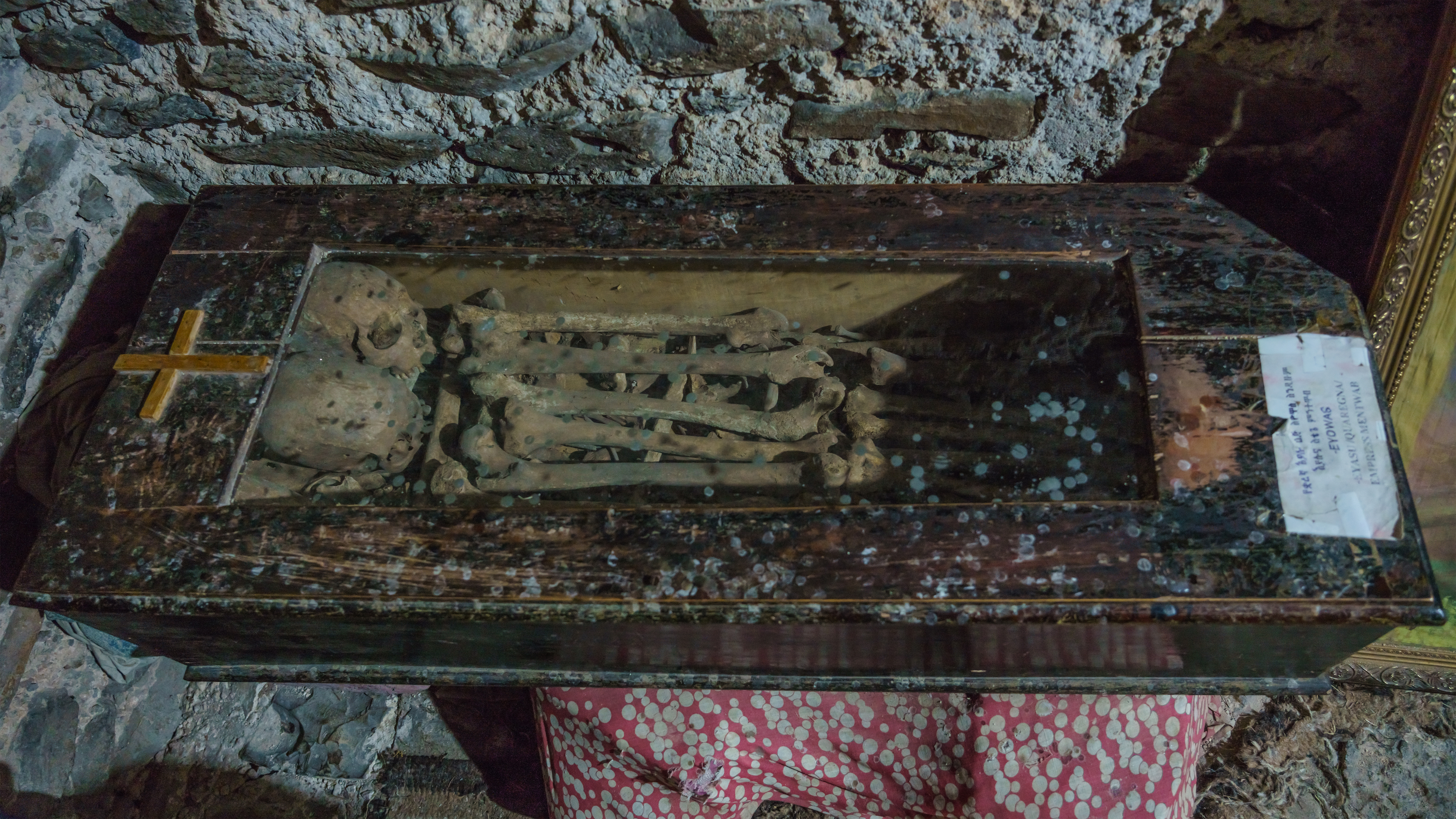
The bones of Mentewab, Iyasu II, and Iyoas I, in Kuskwam (Gondar)

Iyasu fell seriously ill in May, 1755, and died the next month. It was generally believed that he had been poisoned by the sister of Melmal Iyasu, in revenge for her brother's death. When the Empress Mentewab sought funds from the treasury for his funeral, only a few dinars could be found. Saddened by this situation, she threatened to retire to her palace convent at Qusquam, but a group of nobles persuaded her to instead become regent for her grandson Iyoas I.

== Family ==
=== First marriage and descendants ===
Iyasu II had two wives. The first Amhara woman, with whom he had three sons named Adigo, Hailu and Atseku and one daughter Wald Saala. This woman wished to take part in the government of Ethiopia and as a result she and her sons were sent to the fortress of Wanhi on the orders of Mentewab.

● Adigo was his Iyasu's firstborn son. Adigo's son, Salomon II reigned as Emperor between 1777 and 1779 during the turbulent Zemene Mesafint era. Salomon's son, Baeda Maryam II was briefly on the throne for a few months in 1795.

● Hailu (Note: Hailu was also spelled as Aylo) was his second son.

● Atseku was his third son. Atseku's son, Iyasu III reigned as Emperor between 1784 and 1788

● Wald Saala was Iyasu's first daughter.

=== Second marriage and descendants ===
Mentewab wished to make an alliance with the Oromo people and as such chose a second wife for Iyasu II who was of royal Oromo descent. The second wife was a daughter of Amito, a chief of the Edjaw tribe. The wife was christened "Bersabeh" and had a son who later succeeded Iyasu II as Iyoas I.

== Notes ==
Regnal titles
Preceded by Bakaffa	Emperor of Ethiopia; 1730–1755	Succeeded by Iyoas I
