= Dawit III =

Emperor of Ethiopia from 1716 to 1721

Dawit III ሣልሳዊ ዐፄ ዳዊት
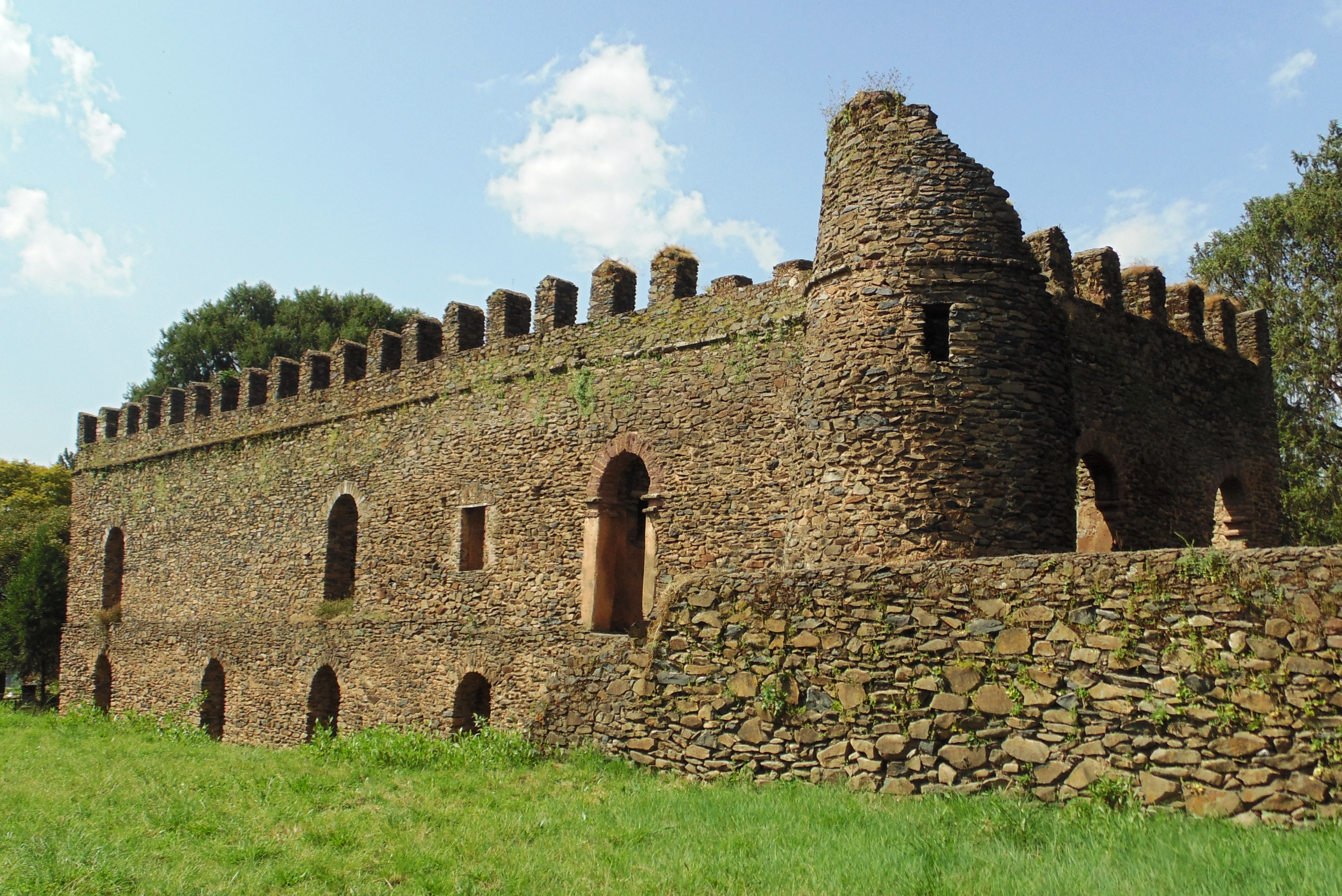
- Palace of Dawit III

Emperor of Ethiopia
- Reign: 8 February 1716 – 18 May 1721
- Predecessor: Yostos
- Successor: Bakaffa
- Born: 1694 or 1695
Regnal name
- Adbar Sagad
- Dynasty: House of Solomon
- Father: Iyasu I
- Mother: Qeddesta Krestos
- Religion: Ethiopian Orthodox Church

Dawit III (Ge'ez: ዳዊት), throne name Adbar Sagad (Ge’ez: አድባር ሰገድ), also known as Dawit the Singer, was Emperor of Ethiopia from 8 February 1716 to 18 May 1721, and a member of the Solomonic dynasty. He was the son of Iyasu I and his concubine Qeddesta Krestos.

== Reign ==
Three important religious events happened during Dawit III's reign. The first was the death of Abuna Marqos – Dawit sent to the Patriarch of Alexandria for a new candidate for the office, and Krestodolos arrived a few years later.

The second was when three Capuchin missionaries entered Ethiopia without imperial permission, were tried by an ecclesiastical council, found to be heretics, and together with a child who accompanied them were stoned to death at Mount Abbo, just east of Gondar.

The third was a synod of the Ethiopian Orthodox Tewahedo Church, presided over by Dawit, concerning Christology disputed between the monks of the House of Ewostatewos in Gojjam and the monks of Debre Libanos, and where the Emperor sided with the Ewostathians. The monks of Debre Libanos then demonstrated against the results of the council, irritating Emperor Dawit to the point he sent a party of pagan Oromo from his Guard to slaughter them.

Dawit was also known for his patronage of Amharic folk songs, building an amusement hall (Dawit's Hall) in the Royal Enclosure, where he could hear ministrels perform, for which he was known as "Dawit the Singer". However, this epithet has a connotation of "playboy, which Donald Levine writes "was not deserved". "Knowledgeable Gondares today insist that, at first, even the priests were happy to join him in the amusement hall to listen to the one-string fiddles and the witty songs." Only after the conclusion of the Synod of Gondar did the priests begin to besmirch his name.

Dawit fell ill shortly after this synod, and died under mysterious circumstances. His courtiers and a Muslim apothecary were accused of poisoning him and executed.

== Notes ==
Regnal titles
Preceded by Yostos	Emperor of Ethiopia; 1716–1721	Succeeded by Bakaffa
