= Betul Haile Maryam =

Ethiopian noble (1812–1853)

Betul Haile Maryam (Note: Betul Haile Mariam is also spelled in various sources as Betul Hayla Maryam) (1812 – 29 June 1853, Ayshal) was a member of the Semien nobility through his paternal line in the Ethiopian Empire.

== Biography ==
=== Background ===
Betul Haile Maryam was a son of Haile Maryam Gebre, the provincial governor of Semien by Hirut Gugsa.

His father, Haile Maryam, belonged to the Orthodox Christian Amharas. His mother, Hirut, was of mixed ancestry. She was the daughter of the Solomonic princess Amete Selassie, and the Solomonic Amhara Emperor Tekle Giyorgis I. Hirut's father was Gugsa of Yejju, who had Oromo genealogy.

His full siblings were Merso Haile Maryam and Yewub-dar Haile Maryam, both of whom were older. His half brother Wube Haile Maryam was one of the most famous protagonist of the Zemene Mesafint era.

=== Exile ===
After the death of his father, Haile Maryam Gebre in 1826. Semien military officers chose Wube Haile Maryam to lead Semien instead of his brother Merso. Betul with his mother and Merso fled to Tigray province. Betul's sister Yewub-dar was married to Sabagadis Woldu, the Irob warlord that controlled much of Tigray.

=== Wube's conquest of Tigray ===
In 1831, however, when Wube went on to conquer Tigray in the aftermath of the Battle of Debre Abbay. Humiliated, Betul and Merso entered into the service of Wube's army and joined his campaigns against the sons of Sabagadis, their former patron. Both of them despised their subordination and dependency to their half brother Wube.

=== Shifting alliances ===
In 1840, Betul and Merso allied with their mother's nephew, the regent Ali II of Yejju, and this was soon followed by a battle with Wube at Debre Tabor in 1842. Wube, first victorious, was then captured during festivities by his half brothers and ras Ali's authority was restored. However, a quick reversal of alliances brought about the arrest of Betul and Merso on their way to Semien. After their brief imprisonment, they were given small districts to govern in Gojjam under Ras Ali's control.

=== Death ===
On 29 June 1853 a decisive battle took place on the plains of Ayshal, between the forces of Ras Ali against that of Kassa Hailu. The battle was one the bloodiest of the Zemene Mesafint era. The charges of the Oromo cavalry were only smashed because of Kassa's personal bravery and because of the devotion of his Amhara followers. When it became apparent that Kassa was about to be victorious, Ras Ali was among the first to flee from the battlefield. Serving in Ali's army, Betul was killed during this battle.

== Notable descendants ==
Betul Haile Maryam wife, also called Yewubdar, was from Gondar. They had four children (Wale, Alula, Taytu and Desta).

- Welle Betul was his eldest son.
- Alula Betul was his second eldest son.
- Taytu Betul was his eldest daughter. She was the former Empress of Ethiopia and was the spouse of Emperor Menelik II.
- Desta Betul was his third son.
