= Tiruwork Wube =

Empress consort of Ethiopia and wife of Emperor Tewodros II

Empress Tiruwork Wube
- Born: c. 1840s
- Died: 16 May 1868; Near Magdala, Ethiopia
- Other names: Queen Terunesh
- Occupation: Empress consort
- Known for: Role in the 1868 British Expedition to Abyssinia; mother of Prince Alemayehu
- Title: Empress consort of Ethiopia
- Spouse: Tewodros II
- Children: Dejazmach Alemayehu
- Parents: Wube Hayle Maryam (father); Woizero Lakiyaye (mother)

Tiruwork Wube (died 16 May 1868), also known as Queen Terunesh, was Empress consort of Ethiopia as the second spouse of Emperor Tewodros II of Ethiopia.

== Origin ==
She was the daughter of Dejazmatch Wube Hayle Maryam, an ethnic Amhara, and the prince of Semien province who became the virtual ruler of all of northern Ethiopia after his conquest of Tigray province and parts of modern day Eritrea during the 1830s and 1840s. Her mother was Woizero Lakiyaye, a noblewoman of Tigray Tiruwork Wube was maternally a descendant of Ras Wolde Selassie who ruled much of the region and established his capital at Chalacot in the late 1700s. The family of Dejazmatch Wube were descended from Emperor Fasilides, and the Dejazmatch had long harbored ambitions of becoming Emperor himself. However, Tewodros II defeated Wube, and had himself crowned at the church of Derasge Maryam that Wube is said to have built for his own planned coronation. Tewodros is said to have especially hated Dejazmach Wube among his enemies and ordered that he be chained and imprisoned for life along with his sons. A deeply religious woman, Tiruwork Wube endured her father's condition by resorting to prayer and fasting, and planned on entering a convent.

== Marriage ==
Following the death of Tewodros II's much loved first wife, Empress Tewabech Ali, his intimates began to discreetly look for an appropriate consort to provide him with an heir and to calm his more extreme moods as his late wife had done. Legend states that one of the Emperor's officers was attending Sunday services at a church at Derasge when Tewodros was staying there, and was struck at the beauty, the aristocratic deportment, and the deep piety of a woman worshiping there. He immediately went to the Emperor and told him he had seen the woman "meant to be the wife of my sovereign". Tewodros made inquiries, and learned that the woman was none other than the daughter of his enemy Wube Hayle Maryam. However, her royal bearing, her illustrious family tree, and great beauty impressed him sufficiently to want to marry the daughter of one of his greatest foes. Tiruwork Wube resisted, begging to be allowed to enter a convent, but her family prevailed upon her to marry the Emperor in hopes that the harsh imprisonment of her father and brothers might be ended, or at least eased. Unfortunately, the marriage was not a particularly happy one. Unlike his first wife, his new Empress was not able to calm his rages, and probably had little interest in doing so. The Emperor had ordered the conditions of imprisonment eased on Dejazmach Wube and his sons, but had not freed them as Empress Tiruwork had hoped, and this contributed to the coldness that developed between them. Tiruwork Wube also believed that in marrying Tewodros, whom her peers regarded as a usurper, she had married below her station. She deliberately refused to rise to her feet when he entered a room as was customary, often pretending not to have seen him. Once upon entering a room where his wife was seated, Tewodros found her reading a book of Psalms and pretending to not notice his entrance. He angrily asked her why she did not rise. The Empress ignored him. In a fury the Emperor loudly demanded to know why she dared to ignore him when he spoke to her, she casually looked up and said "I am speaking with someone far greater than you". The Emperor stormed out. Tiruwork Wube was cold and condescending to Tewodros, and he was angry and cruel in return. He philandered regularly, even referring to one of his mistresses as "Empress Yitemegnu". They did however manage to produce a son, Dejazmach Alemayehu Tewodros, whom both adored.

While the marriage was quite stormy, and they spent time separated from each other frequently, they were reconciled on several occasions, and were reconciled at the time that the British arrived in 1868 to free the European prisoners the Emperor had seized. On one occasion, when Menelik of Shewa arrived at Magdala with his army and threatened to take over the mountain citadel in Tewodros' absence, Empress Tiruwork was instrumental in rallying the Emperor's forces and repelling Menelik.

== Death ==
Upon Tewodros II's defeat and suicide on Easter Monday 1868, the commander of the British Expeditionary Force, Sir Robert Napier took Empress Tiruwork and her son under his protection. After initially agreeing to allow her son to go to England with the expedition while she returned to her native Simien, Empress Tiruwork then suddenly decided that she would accompany her son. Empress Tiruwork was suffering an illness, and the stress from the death of her husband and her uncertain future took their toll. Napier accorded the Empress every royal dignity and assured that Tewodros' family were treated appropriately. The Empress learned that her male relatives, in reply to Napier's request as to what should be done for the Empress, had said "do what you want with her". Hurt by this betrayal, she was also being harassed by a Captain Speedy from the British forces, who had previously been acquainted with Tewodros, and now constantly tried to get his widow to appoint him guardian to young Alemayehu. She asked Napier to keep him away, and he ordered Speedy to stop harassing the Empress. The expedition left for the coast, but the Empress' health began a swift decline. She died before she reached the coast, and her young orphaned son left for Britain without any relative at his side.

Empress Tiruwork Wube was accorded full honors by the British troops as her body was carried away to the monastery of the Holy Trinity at Chalacot in Tigray, where her paternal grandfather had been buried. She was mourned by her mother, Woizero Lakiyaye, who before departing with her daughter's body for Tigray, handed Napier a letter for Queen Victoria. In it, the grandmother of Dejazmach Alemayehu asked the British Queen to care for the little prince as if he were her own, as she herself, could no longer be of any help to him. The letter touched the Queen deeply, and she took over responsibility for Alemayehu's education. Queen Victoria wrote of her sadness in her diary when the Ethiopian prince died at age 19, just a few years later.

In addition to having been the aunt of her husband's first wife, Empress Tewabech Ali, Empress Tiruwork was also the first cousin of Empress Taytu Betul, consort of Emperor Menelik II.

== Notes ==
Tiruwork Wube House of Solomon Born: circa 1848 Died: 16 May 1868
Royal titles
| Vacant Title last held by Tewabech Ali | Empress consort of Ethiopia; February 1860 – 13 April 1868 | Succeeded by Dinqinesh Mercha |
