= List of royal consorts of Ethiopia =

The royal consorts of Ethiopia were spouses of the monarchs of Ethiopia. In ancient times the territory of modern day Ethiopia included the Kingdom of Axum. In medieval times, a kingdom ruled by the Zagwe dynasty developed but was later deposed by the Solomonic dynasty, who would establish the Ethiopian Empire. The following list includes known consorts from the Axumite period to the abolition of the Ethiopian monarchy in 1975.

== Axumite period (c. 100 – c. 960) ==
Name	Spouse	Notes
Sofya	Ella Amida (r. early 320s to late 340s)	Mother of Ezana and ruled as regent during his minority. The 1922 regnal list of Ethiopia includes Sofya as a reigning monarch in her own right under the name "Ahywa Sofya", with regnal dates of 299 to 306 (c. 306–313 on the Gregorian calendar).
Admas	Ella Gabaz (r. mid-6th century)	According to legend, this queen was a daughter of a king named Ilassahl, who was murdered by Ella Gabaz (or Elagabaz). Her brother, Suhal or Shahel, later murdered Elagabaz and his pagan wife Lab and proclaimed himself king.
Lab	Ella Gabaz (r. mid-6th century)	According to legend, Lab was a pagan woman from a neighbouring district to Axum. She was murdered along with her husband by Shahel, brother of Admas. According to the 1922 regnal list of Ethiopia, this took place in 398 (c. 405 on the Gregorian Calendar).
Makia Maryam	Ayzur (r. 8th century)	A manuscript from Gojjam stated that she was the wife of a king named Ayzur, who only reigned for half a day due to being suffocated by a crowd on the day he was crowned. According to the 1922 regnal list of Ethiopia, this took place in 780 (c. 787 on the Gregorian calendar).

== Zagwe dynasty (c. 960 or 1137 – 1270) ==
The following table is incomplete.

Name	Spouse	Notes
Masoba Warq	Mara Takla Haymanot	According to one tradition, this woman was a daughter of Dil Na'od (the last king of Axum) who was overthrown by Mara Takla Haymanot in the 10th century. However, many historians doubt the dating of the Zagwe dynasty beginning this early and other traditions do not mention Masoba Warq. A manuscript from Dabra Libanos listed 44 kings who ruled at Shewa following the deposition of Dil Na'od by Gudit, with Masoba Warq being named. This list suggests that Masoba Warq may have been a Queen Regnant of Shewa.
Masqal Kibra	Lalibela	One tradition claims that she persuaded her husband to give the throne to Na'akueto La'ab, but convinced him to take the throne back 18 months later when La'ab's soldiers appropriated a poor farmer's only cow for the king's dinner table. The church of Biete Abba Libanos is said to have been built by this queen in memory of her husband.

== Solomonic dynasty ==
=== Pre-Gondarine period (1270 – 1682) ===
The following table is incomplete.

Name	Picture	Spouse	Notes
Jan Mogassa		Amda Seyon I (r. 1314–1344)	Formally a concubine of Wedem Arad.
3 wives (possibly including Lazzab Warqa)		Newaya Krestos (r. 1344–1372)	Newaya Krestos married these three women after he became king.
Lazzab Warqa		Newaya Krestos (r. 1344–1372)	Mother of Dawit I.
Seyon Mangasha		Dawit I (r. 1382–1413)	Mother of Tewodros I.
Igzi Kebra		Dawit I (r. 1382–1413)	Mother of Zara Yaqob.
Eleni		Zara Yaqob (r. 1434–1468)	Born in the Hadiya Sultanate. Following the Sultanate's invasion by Zara Yaqob, she was captured, baptised and married to the Ethiopian Emperor. She was given the title of "Queen Mother" by her step-son Baeda Maryam I following his accession to the throne in 1468. Ruled as Queen Regent from 1507 to 1516 during the minority of Dawit II. Died in April 1522.
Seyon Morgasa		Zara Yaqob (r. 1434–1468)	Mother of Baeda Maryam I. Died in 1462.
Gera Ba'altihat (or Fere Maryam)		Zara Yaqob (r. 1434–1468)	Her children were named Berhan Zamada, Madhen Zamada, Sabala Maryam and Del Debaba.
Romna Wark		Baeda Maryam I (r. 1468–1478)	Mother of two sons, Eskender and 'Enkua 'Esra'el. She ruled as regent during the reign of her son Eskender.
Eresh-Gazet		Baeda Maryam I (r. 1468–1478)	Mother of Theodore.
Kalyupe		Baeda Maryam I (r. 1468–1478)	Mother of Na'od.
Na'od Mogesa		Na'od (r. 1494–1508)	Mother of Dawit II.
Seble Wongel		Dawit II (r. 1508–1540)	Married in either 1512 or 1513. Mother of Gelawdewos and Menas. Died on 5 December 1567.
Adimas Moas		Menas (r. 1559–1563)	Daughter of Robel, governor of Bora and Selawe. Married Menas before he became Emperor.
Admas Mogasa		Menas (r. 1559–1563)	Mother of Sarsa Dengel. Outlived her husband.
Maryam Sena		Sarsa Dengel (r. 1563–1597)	Influenced her husband to choose Yaqob instead of Za Dengel as his successor.
Nazarena		Yaqob (r. 1597–1603 and 1604–1607)	A foreigner. Had 3 sons.
Woizero Wangelawit		Za Dengel (r. 1603–1604)	Daughter of Susenyos I.
Seltan Mogasa		Susenyos I (r. 1606–1632)	Also known as Wald Sa'ala. Mother of Fasilides and six other children. Died in 1661.

=== Gondarine period (1682 – 1769) ===
The following table is incomplete.

Picture	Name	Birth	Marriage	Became Consort	Coronation	Ceased to Be Consort	Death	Spouse
	Sabla Wangel	Unknown				19 July 1682; Husband's death	January 1689	Yohannes I
	Walatta Seyon	Unknown	September 1683		Unknown	May 1693		Iyasu I
	First wife of Bakaffa	Unknown			Unknown; Died on the day of her coronation			Bakaffa
	Mentewab	c. 1706	6 September 1722		Unknown	19 September 1730; Husband's death	27 June 1773	Bakaffa
	Woman from Amhara	Unknown						Iyasu II
	Welete Bersabe	Unknown						Iyasu II

=== Era of the Princes (1769 – 1855) ===
The following table is incomplete.

Picture	Name	Birth	Marriage	Became Consort	Coronation	Ceased to Be Consort	Death	Spouse
	Waletta Selassie	Unknown						Yohannes II
	Walatta Iyasus	Unknown	1801		Unknown	12 June 1818; Husband's death	Unknown	Egwale Seyon
	Menen Liben Amede	Unknown	Before 1840	30 August 1840; Husband's accession	Unknown	October 1841; Husband's deposition (Note: Became Empress again during the brief second and third reigns of her husband in 1845 and 1850–1851 respectively.)	1858	Yohannes III

=== Modern Ethiopia (1855 – 1975) ===
Picture	Name	Birth	Marriage	Became Consort	Coronation	Ceased to Be Consort	Death	Spouse
	Tewabech Ali	1831	1848	11 February 1855; Husband's accession	Unknown	19 August 1858		Tewodros II
	Tiruwork Wube	Unknown	February 1860		Unknown	13 April 1868; Husband's death	16 May 1868	Tewodros II
	Dinqinesh Mercha	1815	Before 1868	11 June 1868; Husband's accession	Unknown	11 July 1871 (Note: Retained the title of "Empress" during the reign of her brother Yohannes IV (r. 1871-1889) as he was a widower throughout his reign.); Husband's deposition	August 1907	Tekle Giyorgis II
	Taytu Betul	1851	1882	10 March 1889; Husband's accession	4 November 1889	12 December 1913; Husband's death	11 February 1918	Menelik II
	Sabla Wangel Hailu	1895 or 1896	1909 or 1910	12 December 1913; Husband's accession	Not crowned (Note: Her husband was never crowned.)	27 September 1916; Husband's deposition	1969	Lij Iyasu; Iyasu V
	Gugsa Welle	1875	1900	27 September 1916; Wife's accession	Not crowned	21 March 1930; Died at the Battle of Anchem		Zewditu
	Menen Asfaw	25 March 1889	1909	2 April 1930; Husband's accession		12 September 1974; Husband's deposition	15 February 1962	Haile Selassie
	Medferiashwork Abebe	1922	1945	12 September 1974 (Note: Assumed the title of "Empress-in-exile" on 8 April 1989 when her husband assumed the title of "Emperor-in-exile".); Husband's accession	Not crowned	12 March 1975 (Note: Retained the title of "Empress-in-exile" until her husband's death on 17 January 1997.); Monarchy abolished	13 March 2009	Amha Selassie

=== Italian occupation of Ethiopia (1936 – 1943) ===
Victor Emmanuel III, king of Italy, was declared Emperor of Ethiopia in 1936 after the Italian victory in the Second Italo-Ethiopian War. Italy was later defeated in the East African campaign and lost control of its Ethiopian territories in April 1941, but Victor Emmanuel did not formally renounce his title until November 1943.

Picture	Name	Birth	Marriage	Became Consort	Coronation	Ceased to Be Consort	Death	Spouse
	Elena of Montenegro	8 January 1873	24 October 1896	9 May 1936; Husband declared Emperor	Not crowned	5 May 1941; De facto end of Italian rule November 1943 (De jure)	28 November 1952	Victor Emmanuel III

== See also ==
- List of emperors of Ethiopia
- List of legendary monarchs of Ethiopia
