= Dinqinesh Mercha =

Dinqinesh Mercha (c. 1815 – August 1907) was Empress-Consort of Emperor Tekle Giyorgis II of Ethiopia.

== Life ==
Empress Dinqinesh was the daughter of Shum Mercha of Tembien, and his wife Woizero Silass of Enderta. Through the old aristocratic families of Tembien and Enderta districts of Tigray, Empress Dinginesh could trace her lineage to the Solomonic dynasty through at least two female links.

Her brother Dejazmatch Kassai (sometimes spelled Kassa), was her husband's leading rival for the Imperial throne after the death of their common enemy, Emperor Tewodros II. Following the defeat of her husband (July 11, 1871), and the crowning of her brother as Emperor Yohannes IV (January 12, 1872), Empress Dinqinesh chose to accompany her husband in his captivity, and lived with him at the monastery of Abune Gerima overlooking the town of Adwa. It is often said that her husband had been blinded to prevent him from furthering his Imperial ambitions.

Following her husband's death in 1873, Empress Dinqinesh moved to her brother's capital at Mekele, and was later remarried to Ras Wolde Kiros. She retained her title of Empress, and as her brother Emperor Yohannes was a widower throughout his reign, was the de facto first lady of the Empire during that time. She died at Axum in 1907 during the reign of Menelik II, and was mourned officially as a dowager Empress by the Imperial court in Addis Ababa.

Dinqinesh Mercha House of Solomon Born: circa 1815 Died: August 1907
Royal titles
Vacant Title last held by Tiruwork Wube	Empress consort of Ethiopia; August 1868 – 11 July 1871	Succeeded by Taitu Bitul
