= List of things named after Tewodros II =

This is the list of things (such as landmarks, buildings, institutions or public space) named after the Ethiopian Emperor Tewodros II (r. 1855–1868).

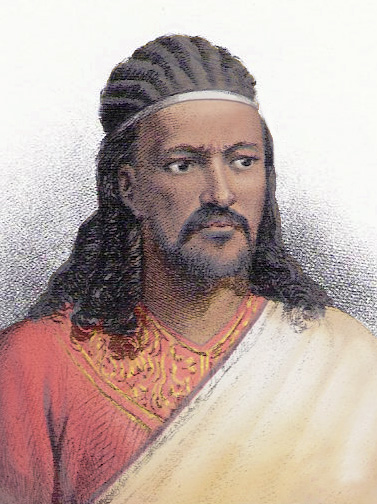
Emperor Tewodros II portrait (1860)

== Sebastopol mortar ==
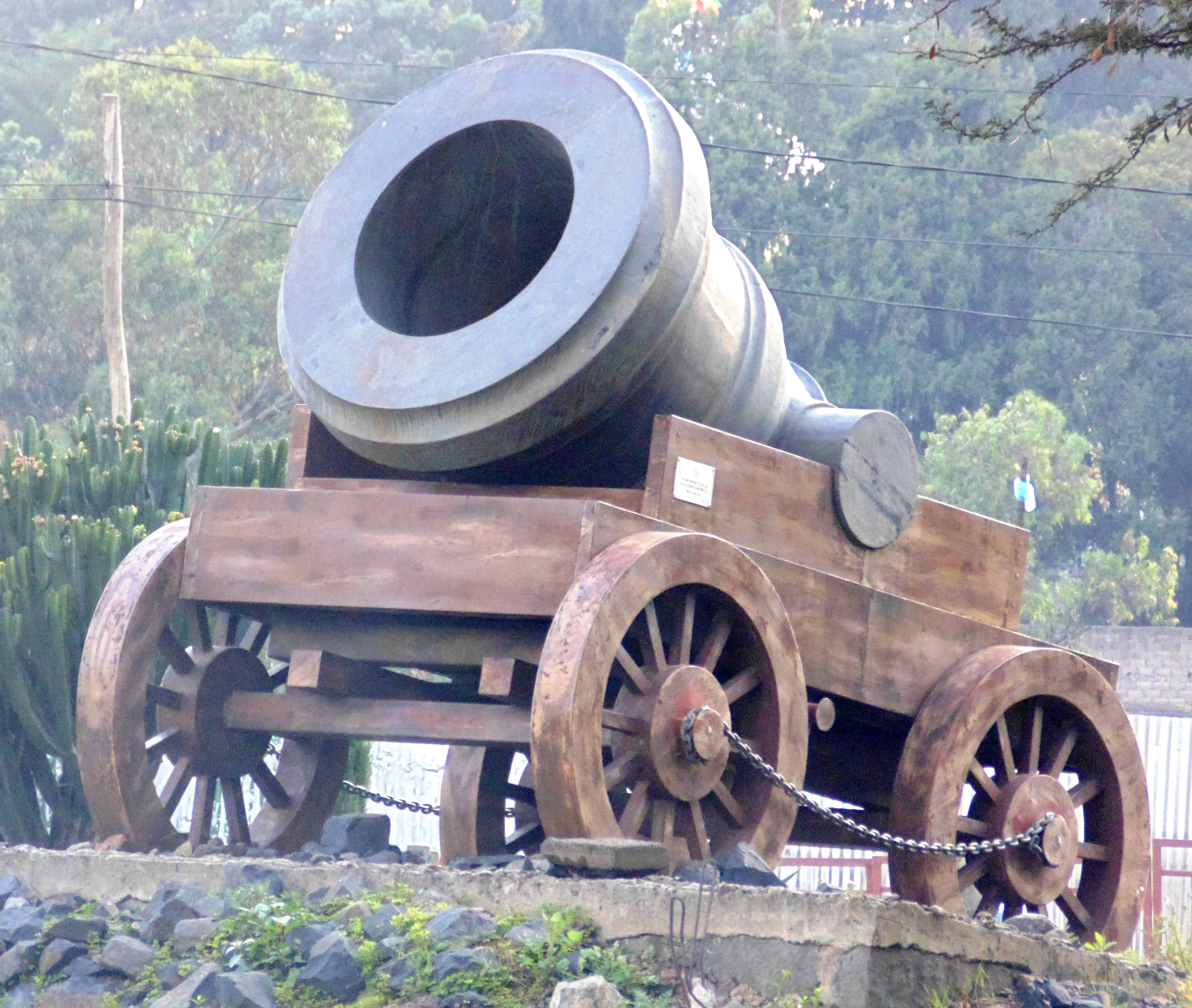
Sebastopol mortar in Addis Ababa

Tewodros Square is located in Sengatera, Arada subcity in Addis Ababa. The monument in the square features Sebastopol artillery.

== Tewodros statue ==
Tewodros statue
- Location: Debre Tabor, South Gondar Zone, Amhara Region, Ethiopia
- Height: 7.5m
- Completion date: 6 February 2018
- Dedicated date: 2018
- Dedicated to: Tewodros II

A memorial monument commemorating Emperor Tewodros II, inaugurated on 6 February 2018, is located in a public space in Debre Tabor town in South Gondar Zone, Ethiopia. It .

The monument stands 7.5 meters tall commissioned by the Debre Tabor University, spending two billion birr. The Minister of Culture and Tourism Hirut Kassaw presented in the inaugural ceremony.

== Tewodros II Secondary School ==
Tewodros II Secondary School was established in 1967 in Debre Tabor and graduated its first senior class in the spring of 1971. It has now accreditation of the Ministry of Education. It offers courses like Biology, Computer, Maths, Chemistry, Physics, English, Amharic, History, Civic, Economics, etc. in two streams: Social Science and Natural Science.
