= Menen Liben Amede =

Empress of Ethiopia and wife of Emperor Yohannes III

Empress of Ethiopia
- Reign: 1819–1858

Regent of Begemder
- Reign: 1831–1841
- Died: 1858
- Spouse: Alula of Yejju; Yohannes III
- Issue: Ras Ali II of Yejju
- Dynasty: House of Solomon

Menen Liben Amede (died 1858) was Empress consort of Ethiopia by marriage to Emperor Yohannes III in 1840–1841, 1845 and 1850–1851.

She was also regent of Begemder in 1831–1841 during the minority of her son Ali II of Yejju, who was her son in her first marriage to Alula of Yejju. She was a significant personage during the Zemene Mesafint of the 19th century before Tewodros II reunited the Ethiopian Empire in 1855.

== Life ==
She married first to Alula of Yejju (sometime governor of Damot and then of Gojjam), with whom she had a son, Ras Ali II of Yejju around the year 1819. After the death of her first spouse, she married the future emperor Yohannes III.

=== Regency ===
On a meeting of the chief nobles of the Yejju at the dynastic capital of Debre Tabor, after the death of Ras Dori in July 1831, Dori's cousin, Menens son Ali was appointed Ruler of Begemder and Imperial Regent at the age of 12. As his father Alula was dead by this time and Ali was a minor, a council of regents was appointed from the nobles of that people. However, Menen soon came to control this council and exerted much influence over political decisions for the next decade.

A palace was built for Menen Liben Amede, though it was not as large as her son's.

=== Empress ===
Following the death of Ras Kenfu, people fought for control of his lands in Gojjam. Eventually Menen gained the upper hand in the Battle of Chenti Ber (October, 1839), defeating and capturing Kinfu's relative Walda Tekle. Not long afterwards, she deposed Sahle Dengel on 29 August 1840 in favor of her husband Yohannes. However, Yohannes offended her son Ras Ali by favoring his rival Wube Haile Maryam, and Ras Ali restored Sahle Dengel in October 1841.

Occupation of the imperial throne alternated between Yohannes and Sahle Dengel until Kassa of Qwara (the future Tewodros II) defeated Empress Menen in combat on 18 June 1847 near the northern shores of Lake Tana, capturing her and Yohannes. He then traded them to Ras Ali for the title of Dejazmach and the territories of the deceased Ras Kinfu in Gojjam. Another source states that when Kassa finally usurped the Imperial throne, Yohannes agreed to acquiesce to the change on the condition that the new Emperor guarantee that he would not ever be made to reunite with his much hated wife, Empress Mennen.

=== Later life ===
On her part, in order to have influence over Kassa Menen offered her granddaughter Tewabech Ali as a bride to him. Nevertheless, Kassa came to love her and was faithful to her until her death in 1858. Menan also awarded Kassa all of Ye Meru Qemas for the same reasons.

Menen disappears from the historical record soon after this.
