= Prince Alemayehu =

Son of Tewodros II of Ethiopia (1861–1879)

- Dejazmatch
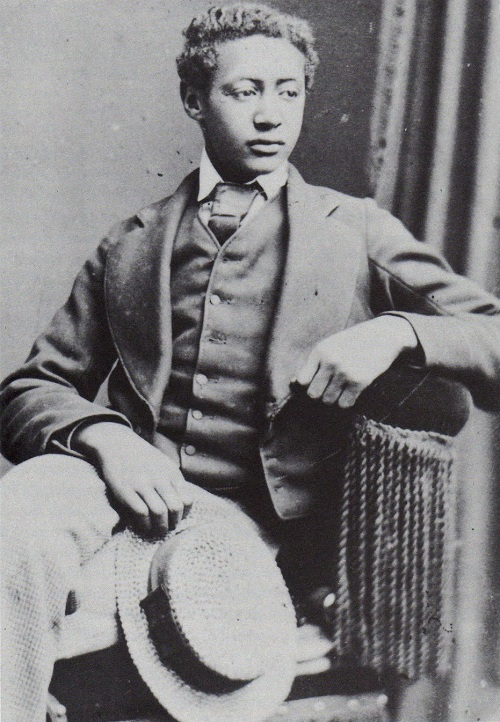
- Prince Alemayehu as a young man. Photograph by Edward Hall Speight of Rugby.
- Born: 23 April 1861
- Died: 14 November 1879 (aged 18); Far Headingley, Leeds, England
- Burial: 21 November 1879; St George's Chapel, Windsor Castle
Names
- Alemayehu Simyen Tewodoros
- Dynasty: House of Solomon
- Father: Tewodros II
- Mother: Tiruwork Wube
- Religion: Ethiopian Orthodox Tewahedo

Dejazmatch Alemayehu Simyen Tewodoros (also referred to as Alamayou; 23 April 1861 – 14 November 1879), was the son of Emperor Tewodros II and Empress Tiruwork Wube of Ethiopia.

== Biography ==
Alemayehu was born on 23 April 1861. His father, Emperor Tewodros II, died by suicide after his defeat by the British led by Sir Robert Napier, at the conclusion of the British Expedition to Abyssinia in 1868. After the Battle of Magdala, the young prince was taken to Britain, under the care of Captain Tristram Speedy, after the British attack on his home, and ransacking of the royal treasures by soldiers and others, including a staff member of the British museum. Ethiopian novelist Maaza Mengiste writes in The Guardian that Alemayehu was kidnapped.

While staying at Speedy's home on the Isle of Wight he was introduced to Queen Victoria at her home at Osborne House. She took a great interest in his life and education. Alamayehu spent some time in India with Speedy and his wife, but the government decided he should be educated in England and he was sent to Lockers Park School and then to Cheltenham to be educated under the care of Thomas Jex-Blake, principal of Cheltenham College. He moved to Rugby School with Jex-Blake in 1875, where one of his tutors was Cyril Ransome (the future father of Arthur Ransome). In 1878, he joined the officers' training school at the Royal Military College, Sandhurst, but he was not happy there and the following year went to Far Headingley, Leeds, West Yorkshire, to stay with his old tutor Cyril Ransome. Within a week he had contracted pleurisy and died after six weeks of illness, despite the attentions of Dr Clifford Allbutt of Leeds and other respected consultants.

Victoria mentioned the death of the young prince in her diary, saying what a good and kind boy he had been and how sad it was that he should die so far from his family. She also mentioned how very unhappy the prince had been, and how conscious he was of people staring at him because of his colour.

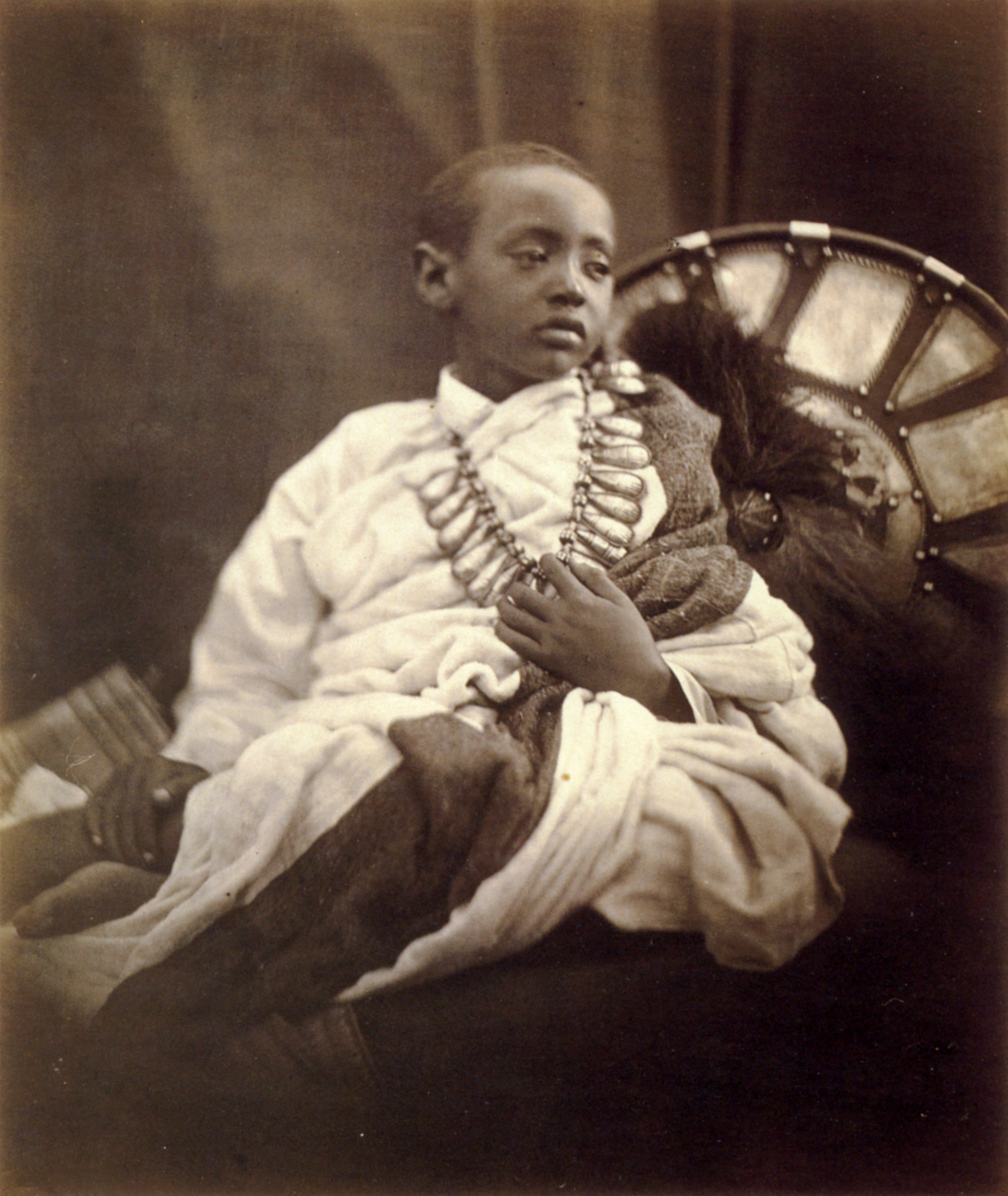
Prince Alemayehu, as photographed by Julia Margaret Cameron at the Isle of Wight in 1868

Victoria arranged for Alamayehu to be buried in the catacombs of St George's Chapel at Windsor Castle. The funeral took place on 21 November 1879, in the presence of Cyril Ransome, Chancellor of the Exchequer Stafford Northcote, General Napier, and Captain Speedy. A brass plaque in the nave of St George's commemorates him and bears the words "I was a stranger and ye took me in", and Alamayehu's body was buried in a brick vault in the catacombs west of the chapel.

In 2007, the Ethiopian government requested the return of Alemayehu's remains for reburial in Ethiopia. As of 2023, Buckingham Palace had denied the request, saying that it would be impossible to remove Alemayehu's remains "without disturbing the resting place of a substantial number of others in the vicinity". However, in September 2023, a lock of Alemayehu's hair was returned to Ethiopia, along with other artefacts looted from Magdala; a relative, Fasil Minas, expressed hope that this progress could lead to the eventual repatriation of the Prince's body.

== In popular culture ==
Alemayehu's life was the basis of the 2001 play Abyssinia that toured England in a production by Tiata Fahodzi. Written by Adewale Ajadi and directed by Femi Elufowoju Jr., it played in The Other Place in Stratford-upon-Avon, Southwark Playhouse and other regional theatres.

The story of Alemayehu's life is told in the radio play I was a Stranger, by Peter Spafford, which was broadcast on BBC Radio 4 in May 2004. The role of Alemayehu was played by Chiwetel Ejiofor.

The story of Alemayehu's life is also told in the book The Prince Who Walked with Lions by Elizabeth Laird (ISBN 978-0230752436) in March 2012.

In December 2012, Alemayehu was featured in the BBC Radio 4 programme Great Lives, nominated by Ethiopian-British poet Lemn Sissay. Elizabeth Laird was the invited expert.

Ethiopian filmmaker, Selam Bekele, reinterpreted Alemayehu's life in a short experimental film titled Prince of Nowhere. The film features an extended monologue and a closing melody by Ethiopian jazz artist, Meklit Hadero. Bekele's film screened throughout the United States in 2014 and 2015.

In May 2015, Alemayehu's story was told by Sissay on an episode of BBC Radio 4's Lemn Sissay's Homecoming.

The podcast, Stuff the British Stole, hosted by Marc Fennell, featured Prince Alemayehu's life and death, on the July 11, 2023 episode, The Unfinished Prince.

The 2026 Spanish nonfiction book Arte secuestrado: Los mármoles del Partenón, el penacho de Moctezuma y otras historias ocultas de nuestros museos [Abducted Art: The Parthenon Marbles, Moctezuma's Headdress, and Other Hidden Stories from Our Museums] by Catharine Titi and Katia Fach Gómez (Península: ISBN 978-8411004381) discusses the life of Prince Alemayehu and the repatriation of his human remains.
