= Alula of Yejju =

Alula of Yejju was the son of Ras Ali I of Yejju (son of Abba Seru Gwangul) and cousin of Ras Gugsa. He was the first husband of Menen Liben Amede and father of her son, Ras Ali II, while governor of Damot, Ethiopia.
