= Walter Plowden =

British diplomat (1820–1860)

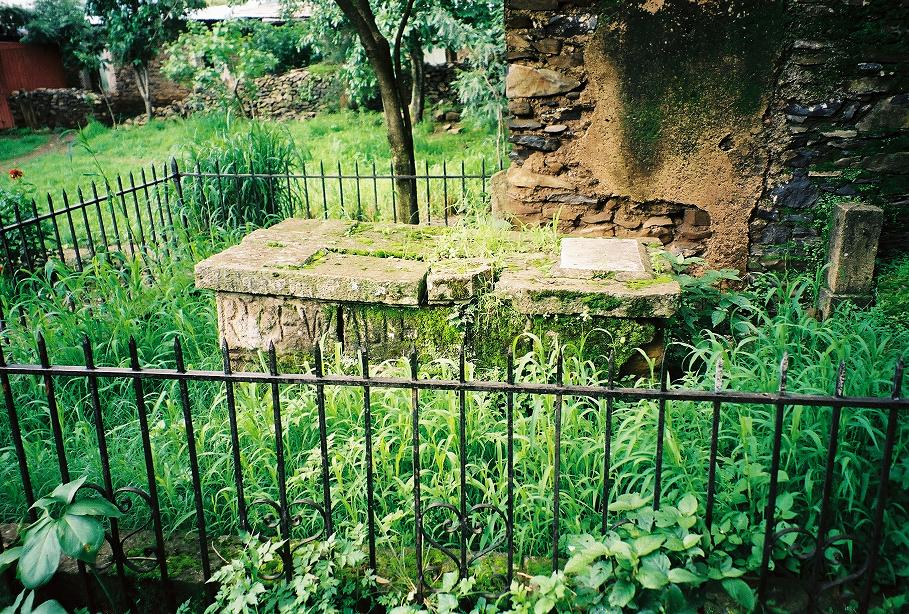
Plowden's grave, Gondar

Walter Charles Metcalf Chichele Plowden (3 August 1820 – 13 March 1860) was a British diplomat, consul at Massawa on the Red Sea coast from 1848 to his death. He played a role in Ethiopian politics in the mid 19th-century: during his tenure he cultivated the friendship of first Ras Ali, and later the Ethiopian emperor Tewodros II.

J. R. Hooker remarks that "as a political agent, Plowden was valuable; as a writer of travel literature he was engaging and intelligent; but as a consul he was useless, his commercial reports being limited to three in 1852. He was never at his post after 1855."

In 1860, Plowden was murdered aged 39 during a journey between Gondar and the Red Sea by a follower of Agew Niguse, a warlord hostile to Tewodros. Plowden was interred in the Royal Enclosure, next to the Gemjabet Mariyam church. His writings were published as Travels in Abyssinia and the Galla Country, with an account of a mission to Ras Ali in 1848 by his brother in London in 1868.
