= Chalacot =

Village in Tigray Region, Ethiopia

- Village
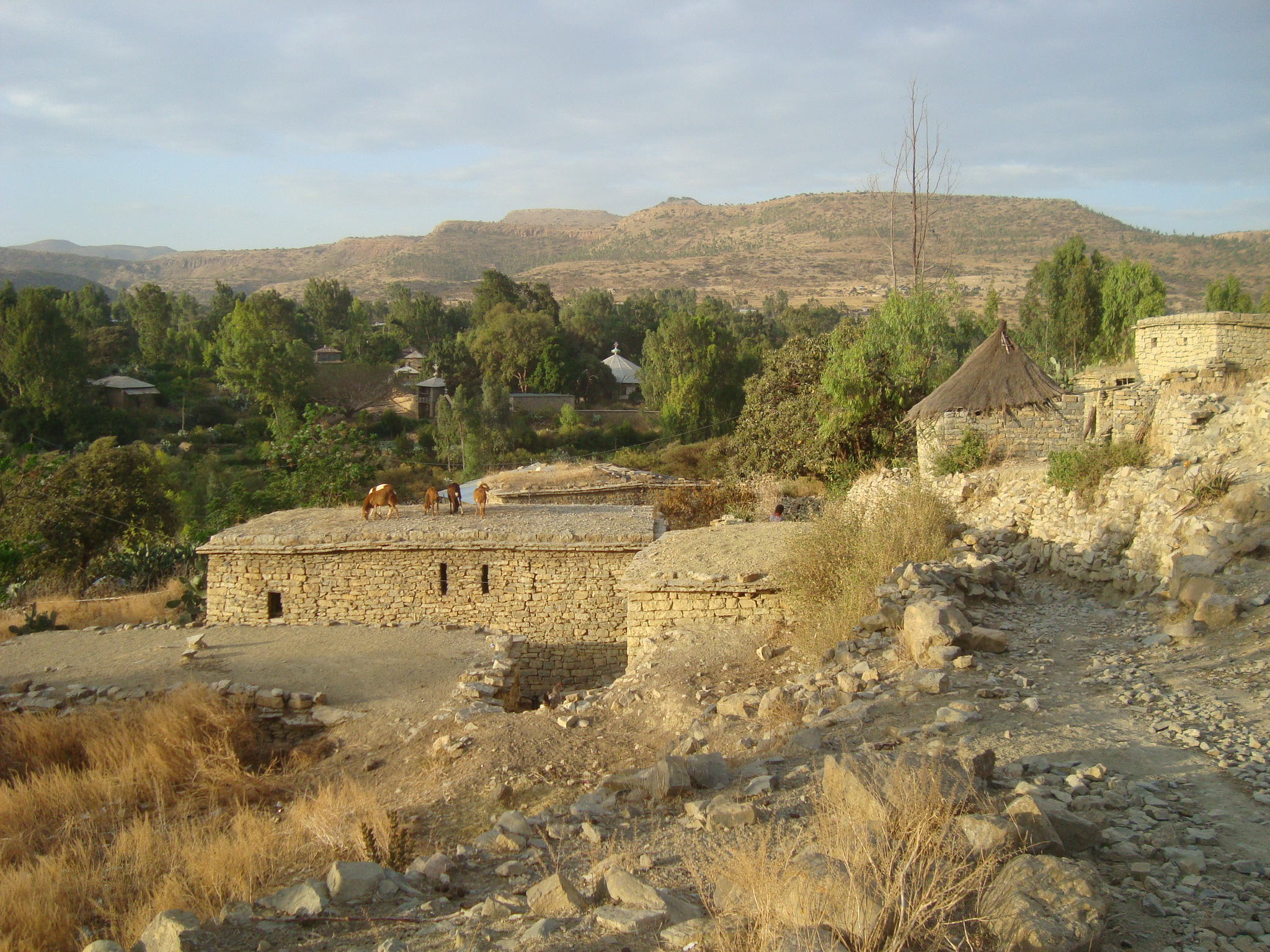

- Location within Ethiopia
- Coordinates: 13°22′N 39°28′E
- Country: Ethiopia
- Region: Tigray
- Zone: Debub Misraqawi (Southeastern)
- Elevation: 2,100 m (6,900 ft)
- Time zone: UTC+3 (EAT)

Chalacot or Chelekot is a village in the Tigray Region of Ethiopia. Located in the Enderta woreda (district) of the Debub Misraqawi (Southeastern) Zone, 10 kilometers north of Antalo and 17 kilometers south of Mek'ele, the village has an approximate elevation of 2100 meters above sea level. The Central Statistical Agency has not published an estimate for this village's 2005 population.

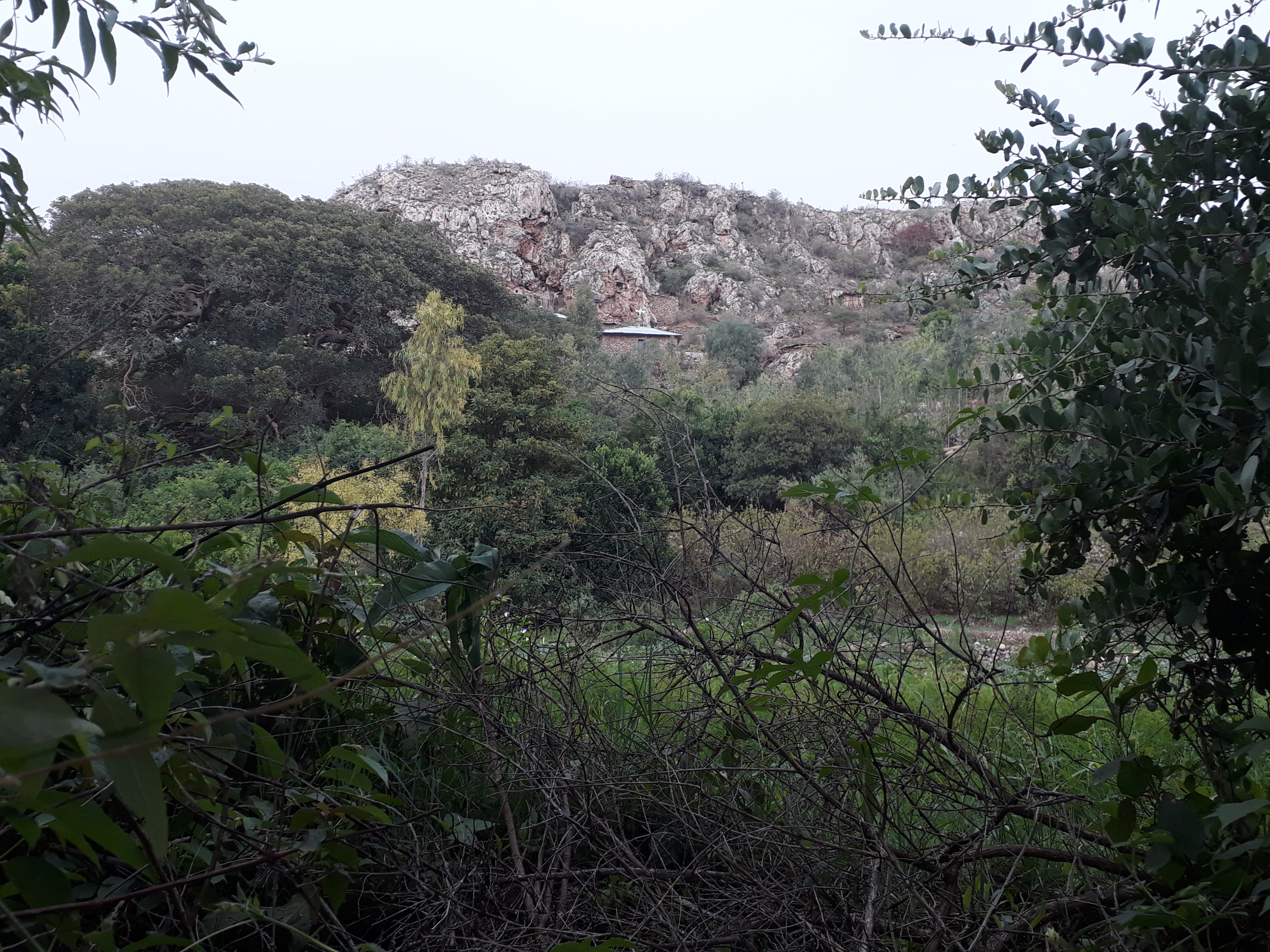
Tufa dam in Chelekwot

== Geology and soils ==
The following geological formations are present in this locality:

- Amba Aradam Formation
- Agula Shale
- Mekelle Dolerite
- Antalo Limestone
- Quaternary alluvium and freshwater tufa

The main geomorphic units, with corresponding soil types are:

- Gently rolling Antalo Limestone plateau, holding cliffs and valley bottoms on limestone
  - Associated soil types
    - shallow stony soils with a dark surface horizon overlying calcaric material (Calcaric Leptosol)
    - moderately deep dark stony clays with good natural fertility (Vertic Cambisol)
    - deep, dark cracking clays on calcaric material (Calcaric Vertisol, Calcic Vertisol)
  - Inclusions
    - Rock outcrops and very shallow soils (Lithic Leptosol)
    - Shallow very stony loamy soil on limestone (Skeletic Calcaric Cambisol)
    - Deep dark cracking clays with very good natural fertility, waterlogged during the wet season (Chromic Vertisol, Pellic Vertisol)
    - Brown to dark sands and silt loams on alluvium (Vertic Fluvisol, Eutric Fluvisol, Haplic Fluvisol)

== History ==
Chalacot is mentioned in a charter written in 1794, when Emperor Tekle Giyorgis made a grant to Meqdese Selassie Church in the village; the document mentions seven properties. Ras Wolde Selassie made Chalacot his capital, and received Henry Salt there in 1810. The Ras built a palace in the village, as well as houses for his wives and the church Chelekot Selassie, which Philips Briggs described as an "architecturally impressive example of the circular tikul styles of paintings" and "covered in beautiful 19th-century paintings". When Wolde Selassie died in Chalacot (1816), his nephew Walda Rufa'el sacked it.

The town had recovered its former prosperity by the 1840s when Ferret and Galiner visited it; they described it as "one of the principal towns" of Ethiopia, with a population of 3,000 living in well-constructed houses and well-kept gardens. However, a little more than a generation later Chalacot had declined; Guglielmo Massaia found only 200 houses with about 1,000 inhabitants and in the 1880s Augustus B. Wylde reported he counted only 80 houses there. The town suffered further losses during the First Italo–Ethiopian War according to Richard Pankhurst, who included Chalacot in a list of northern Ethiopian towns affected by the "disturbed conditions of the times."

== Notable inhabitants ==
Chelekot is the birthplace of Ras Araya Dimtsu, the chief crown councillor to Emperor Yohannes IV of Ethiopia from 1867 to 1889. Ras Araya held significant influence as the governor of Tigray and Akale Guzay. He lost his life at the Battle of Metema in March 1889 while fighting against the Mahdists of Sudan, alongside Emperor Yohannes. Notably, Ras Araya was Emperor Yohannes's maternal uncle. Another noteworthy figure from Chelekot is Emperor Yohannes's mother, Amate Silas Dimtsu, who was born there. Her father, Dejazmach Dimtsu Debbab of Enderta, served as a hereditary chief of Enderta in the 1820s and 1830s.

Chelekot also serves as the burial place of Empress Tiruwork Wube, the granddaughter of Ras Wolde Selassie and the widow of Emperor Tewodros II. During his journey to the Battle of Adwa, Emperor Menelik II visited the churches in Chelekot. As a gesture of gratitude for his victory over the Italians, he bestowed his robes of state upon the Church of the Holy Trinity (Mekdese Selassie), where they are still prominently displayed.
