= Abuna Salama III =

Head (abuna) of the Ethiopian Orthodox Tewahedo Church from 1841 to 1867

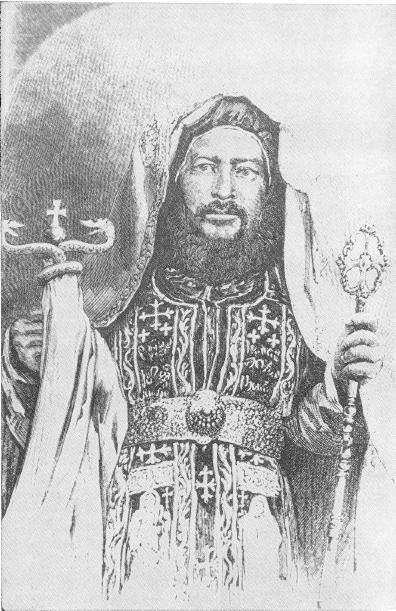
Engraving of Salama III from Henry Stern, Wanderings among the Falasha.

Salama III (died 25 October 1867) was Abuna or head of the Ethiopian Orthodox Tewahedo Church (1841–1867).

Salama was originally brought to Ethiopia by Dejazmach Wube Haile Maryam. He afterwards attached himself to the party of Emperor Tewodros II for his help to settle the theological disputes dividing the Ethiopian Church and to gain control over the fractured Church organization.

As Tewodros' power dwindled, however, Salama found himself more often at odds with the emperor until he was made a prisoner (1864), and eventually confined to the village of Amba Mariam (then called Magdala in Wollo Province), where he died of bronchitis aggravated by his detention.
