= Tristram Speedy =

British explorer

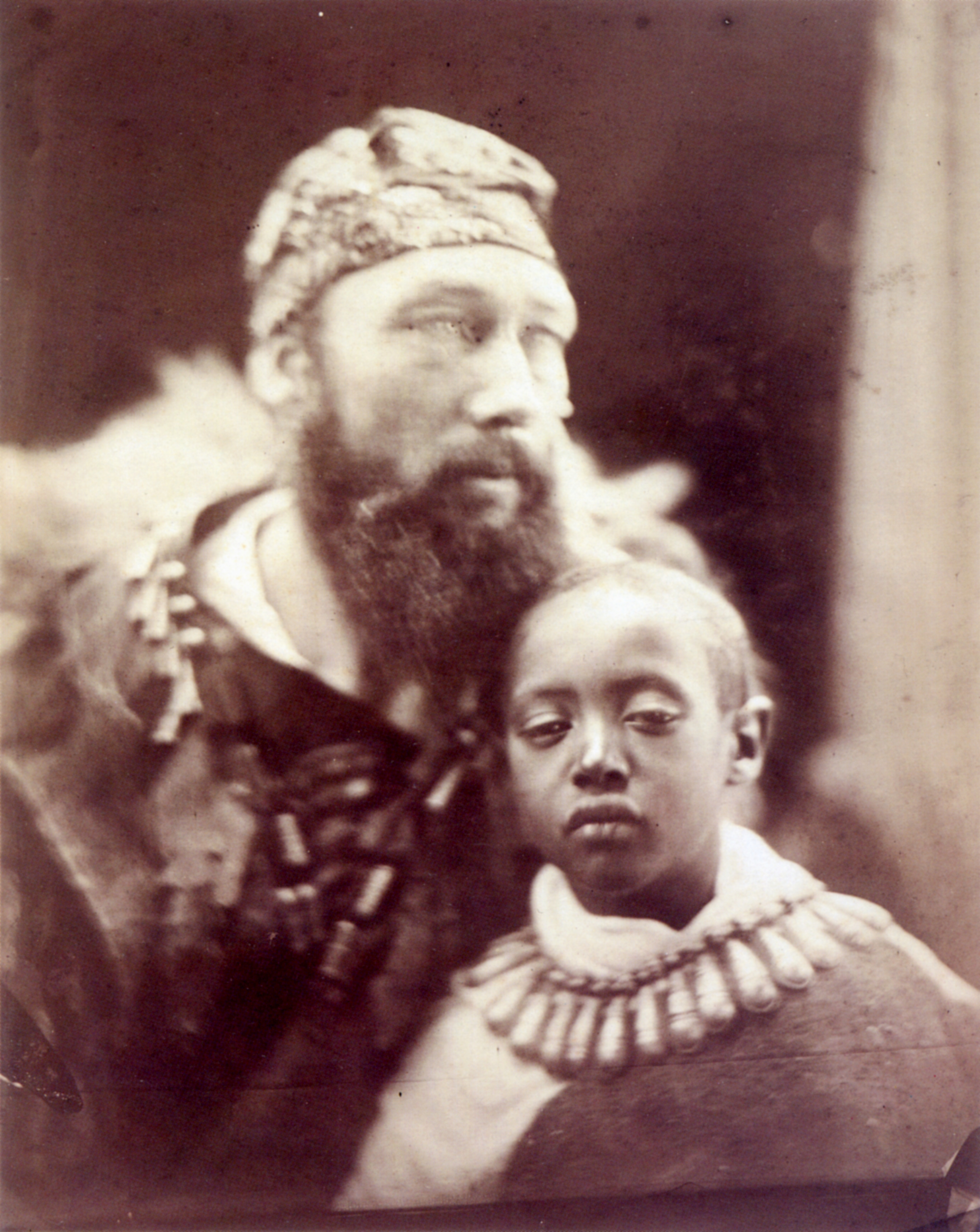
- Tristram Speedy (left) with Prince Alemayehu in 1868.
- Born: Tristram Charles Sawyer Speedy; 1836; Meerut, British India
- Died: 9 August 1910 (aged 73); Church Stretton, Shropshire, England
- Other name: Captain Speedy
- Known for: Guardian of Prince Alemayehu, role in the 1868 Expedition to Abyssinia
- Awards: Indian Mutiny Medal; Punjab Medal; Eufoszai Medal; New Zealand War Medal; Abyssinian War Medal

Tristram Charles Sawyer Speedy (also known as Captain Speedy; November 1836 – 9 August 1910) was a well-known English explorer and adventurer during the Victorian era.

== Life ==
Speedy was born in Meerut, India, a son of James Havelock Speedy, an army officer (a lieutenant in the 3rd Regiment of Foot, born in Dublin in 1811, died 1868 Mauku, New Zealand), and his wife Sarah, an army officer's daughter. After being educated in England, Speedy returned to India as an army officer himself. He served in the North-West Frontier Province from 1854 to 1860, receiving the Indian Mutiny, Punjab and Eufoszai medals.

While hunting in the Horn of Africa, Speedy was summoned to the court of Emperor Tewodros II of Ethiopia, who bestowed on him the title Basha Felika ('Sir Speedy' or 'Commander Speedy'). Tewodros employed him to train his army; however, Speedy fell out with the emperor and had to flee the country.

He then served as locum tenens and British vice-consul at the Red Sea port of Massawa. In early 1864, Speedy resigned to travel to New Zealand, where he served in the Waikato Militia. He was promoted to captain in 1864, and received the New Zealand War Medal.

During Britain's punitive 1868 Expedition to Abyssinia, Speedy's knowledge of Ethiopia was crucial to the commander, Sir Robert Napier. Speedy was recalled to join the expedition and received the Abyssinian War Medal. After an audience with Queen Victoria, Speedy was appointed guardian to Prince Alemayehu Simeon, the young son of the late Emperor Tewodros II, who had committed suicide rather than surrender to the British. Speedy's collection of Ethiopian objects from this time is now in the British Museum.

Speedy married Cornelia Cotton in England, then returned to India with his wife and the Abyssinian prince. He was stationed at Sitapur as District Superintendent of the Oudh Police from 1869 to 1871. During this time, he accompanied the Duke of Edinburgh (the second son of Queen Victoria) on a shooting trip in Nepal.

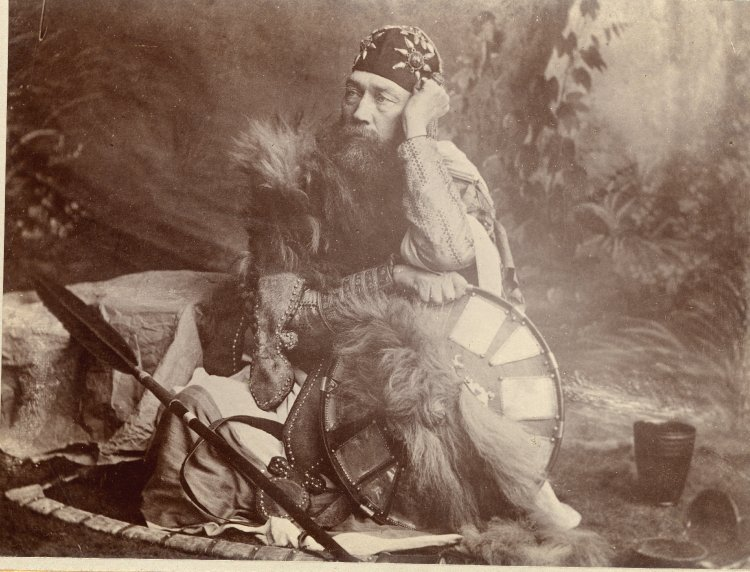
Capt. Speedy photographed in Ethiopian military or noble garb, 1868

In 1871, Speedy sailed to the Straits Settlements in Malaya and became superintendent of police on the island of Penang. He resigned in 1873 to raise and command a body of Indian troops to restore order in Larut, a mining district in the Malayan state of Perak, for the Mentri (Chief Minister) Ngah Ibrahim.

In 1874, Speedy was appointed assistant British Resident of Larut and established the town of ‘Thaipeng’, meaning 'Heavenly Peace'. He remained there until 1877.

The following year his wife published a book about their travels after the pair had spent several months exploring Sudan.

In 1883–85, Speedy took part in the mission led by Vice-Admiral Sir William Hewett to the court of Emperor Yohannes IV of Ethiopia to negotiate the region's disputed borders. He returned to Ethiopia in 1897 as part of Rennell Rodd, 1st Baron Rennell's mission to the court of King Menelik to negotiate the Anglo-Ethiopian Treaty, which defined the border with Sudan.

== Death ==
Speedy, died on 9 August 1910 at Chatsworth, Church Stretton, Shropshire.

== Cultural references ==
- During the Abyssinian War (1867–1868) the correspondents George Henty of The Standard and Henry Stanley of the New York Herald reported on him extensively.
- In The Expression of the Emotions in Man and Animals, by Charles Darwin.
- The pioneering society photographer Julia Margaret Cameron captured his image in a series of portraits in 1868.
- Tristram Speedy appears in A Narrative of Captivity in Abyssinia; With Some Account of the Late Emperor Theodore, His Country and People (1868) by Henry Blanc.
- The traveller Isabella Bird comments on Captain Speedy and his troops in The Golden Chersonese, and the Way Thither (1883).
- A speech given by Speedy to the girls of North London Collegiate School in about 1883 was remembered by Molly Hughes in her A London Girl of the 1880s: "A certain Captain Speedy had just returned from Abyssinia, and gave us an amusing talk about it, dressing up, like a quick-change artist, as a general, a priest, a merchant, a courtier, and so on, and throwing in some amazing details of their religious rites, wedding ceremonies, and methods of commerce. He won our gratitude, too, by saying: 'I understand that you girls have to write an account of my talk to you. Well, the very word Abyssinia means confusion, because the races are confused, the religion is confused, the mountains and valleys are confused, and I know that I am confused in addressing so many girls. So the more confused your accounts are, the better they will represent the country and the lecture.'"
- Captain Speedy was the likely inspiration for Rudyard Kipling's short story "The Lang Men o' Larut" (1889).
- He is mentioned in Robert Louis Stevenson's In the South Seas (1896) as dressed in Abyssinian costume.
- He appears as a hero in Flashman on the March (George MacDonald Fraser, 2005).
- A play entitled I was a Stranger, written by Peter Spafford and based upon Speedy's Abyssinian adventure, was broadcast on the BBC on 17 May 2004.
- Captain Speedy's image is used on the award-winning Timah whisky, produced by the Malaysian Winepak Corporation.
