= Wube Haile Maryam =

Ethiopian governor (1799–1867)

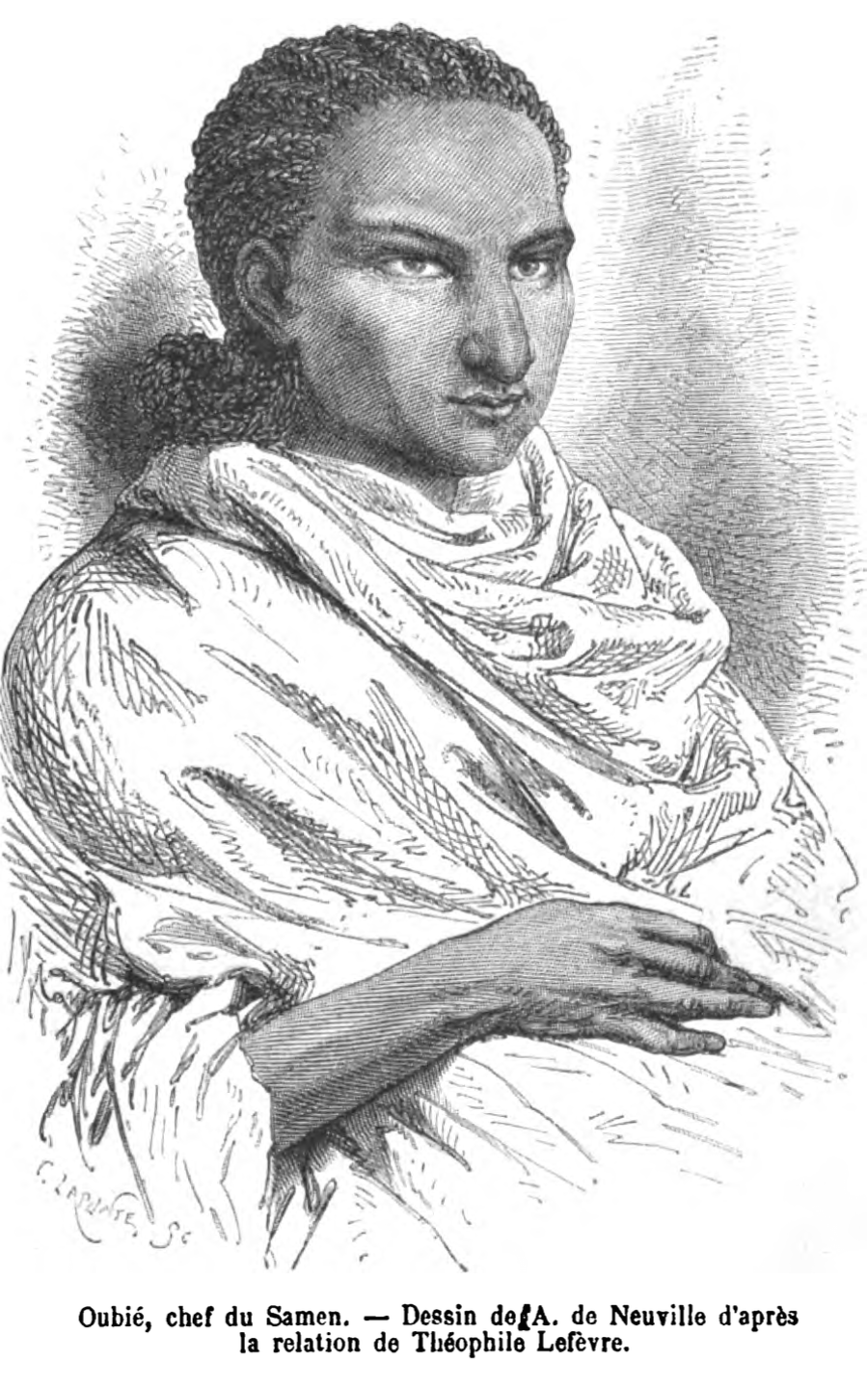
Dej. Wube Illustrated by Alphonse-Marie-Adolphe de Neuville

Wube Haile Maryam of Semien, (Note: Also spelled as Wube Haile Mariam, Wube Hayle Maryam, Wibe Haylä Maryam, Webé Hayla Maryam) (1799 – 1867), also called by his title Dejazmach Wube, Webé; his name is also given in European sources as ‘‘Ubie’’, was one of the major figures of 19th century Ethiopia, during the closing decades of the Zemene Mesafint (lit: Era of the princes) a period of regional lords vying for power, prestige and territory amid a weakened authority of the emperors.

The regional ruler and Dejazmach of his hereditary province of Semien, and later as the conqueror and non-Tigrayan ruler of the Tigray Province and Mereb Melash. Wube is remembered in Eritrea for ruthless military raids. A major claimant to the Ethiopian throne during his era, Wube was defeated and imprisoned in 1855 by another contender Kassa Hailu, the future emperor Tewodros II. Some sources date Wube's defeat as the end of Ethiopia's Zemene Mesafint. He died in chains in 1867.

== Ancestry ==
Of ethnic Amhara descent, Wube's family originated from the Semien mountains. His father, Haile Maryam Gebre, (Note: Gebre of Semien, a legendary governor that ruled a prosperous Semien for 44 years, was the father of Haile Maryam Gebre; his successor. The grandfather of Wube Haile Maryam; ruler of Semien and Tigray. And the great-grandfather of Taytu Betul a future Empress of Ethiopia.) was the governor of the Semien province and belonged to the Orthodox Christian Amharas. His mother, Mintayé of Jan Amora, was a side marriage (or concubine) of his father.

Haile Maryam’s had been arranged to marry Hirut Gugsa, who was of Solomonic royal lineage through her mother, princess Amete Selassie, the daughter of Solomonic Amhara king Tekle Giyorgis I. Hirut's father was the Oromo Regent, Ras Gugsa of Yejju. Hirut was Haile Maryam's ‘‘legitimate wife’’, their children (and Wube's older half siblings) were Merso, Betul and Yewub-dar.

● Merso Haile Maryam was the oldest half-brother and early rival of Wube.

● Betul Haile Maryam was the second half brother. He was the father of Taytu Betul, the future empress of Ethiopia and wife of Emperor Menelik II. Wube was thus an uncle of Taytu.

● Yewub-dar Haile Maryam was Wube's older half sister. One of the wives of Sabagadis Woldu; the Irob warlord that ruled Tigray province from 1822 until 1831. They had one daughter, Yeshimebet Sabagadis; the spouse of Ras Welde Giyorgis Aboye, a cousin of Emperor Menelik II and grandson of Sahle Selassie.

== Career ==
=== Rise of power in Semien ===
Wube served as the governor of Welkait on behalf of his father, Dejazmach Haile Maryam. Before Haile Maryam death he chose his third son, Wube’s half-Brother Merso, to succeeded him as the governor of semien. However, due to the fact that Merso mother was of Yejju origin, Semien military officers choose Wube as the new governor since his mother was native of Semien.

After Wube's usurpation, his two half brothers and Hirut Gugsa; their mother, fled to Tigray province to their sister Yewub-dar, wife of Sabagadis Woldu.

=== Early defeat and vassalage ===
In 1827, Wube was immediately challenged by the ruler of northwestern Ethiopia, Ras Yimam, and Dejazmach Maru of Dembiya. Wube fought the combined forces of Yimam and Maru and lost but managed to survive the battle. He saw his realm shrink after ceding Wogera, which the Ras awarded to Maru of Dembiya. Ras Yimam, wary of Maru's ambitions, recognized Wube's governorship over the rest of Semien in return for his fealty. For a few years, Wube depended on the overlordship of the great warlords and governors of Begemder and Gondar in northwestern Ethiopia. After his early defeat, Wube tried to strengthen his personal independence.

Later that year, Maru of Dembiya rebelled against Ras Yimam and sided with his rival; Dejazmach Goshu of Gojjam and Damot. Ras Yimam turned to Wube for military backing, which he honored. In October 1827, the combined armies of Yimam and Wube met the combined armies of Goshu and Maru at Kosso Ber in Gojjam and defeated them. Goshu escaped to his mountain fortress but Maru of Dembiya was killed and most of his territories given to Yimam's brother, Dejazmach Marye Gugsa. Half of Wogera was restored back under Wube's control by the Ras, as a reward for his service.

=== Broken alliance ===
Wube then married Dinqinesh Sabagadis, the daughter of the Irob warlord and ruler of Tigray, Dejazmach Sabagadis Woldu, to foster an alliance against Yimam's successor, Ras Marye Gugsa.

In 1830 however, Ras Marye invaded Semien, and Sabagadis broke his oath by not coming to Wube's aid, thus leaving Semien to be ravaged by conflict. In a dramatic shift of alliances, Wube sided with Marye against Sabagadis; in turn Sabagadis invaded Semien with his forces and drove Wube out of his fortresses of Amba Tazzan and Amba Hay. Sabagadis recognized Wube's half brother and rival Merso Haile Maryam as the governor of Semien before his return to Tigray.

=== Conquest of Tigray and Mereb Melash ===
In February 1831, Wube and Ras Marye responded with a vigorous military campaign into Tigray. Marye and Wube's coalition met the forces of Sabagadis near the Tekeze river and conflict ensued. Ras Marye perished, but Sabagadis lost (the Battle of Debre Abbay) and was executed by Ras Marye's followers the following day. Wube and his troops remained in Tigray.

In the aftermath of Sabagadis's death, Tigray Province plunged into chaos. Sabagadis' many enemies and rivals turned against his offspring. Moreover, even Sabagadis's own sons and supporters fought each other for ascendancy. Wube took advantage of the divided aristocracy, and pacified the region after a series of wars. He spared Sabagadis's sons (his wife Dinqinesh's brothers) and appointed them as tributary provincial governors in return for their submission.

Wube then extended his rule over the northern highlands into the Mereb Melash and Akele Guzay (in today’s Eritrea) with the submission of the lord of Merab Melash in 1832. Oral tradition in Eritrea and Tigray preserves strong memories of Wubé as a ruthless and brutal warlord. His armies even reached the Bogos area, a dependency of the Hamasén lords of the Mereb Mellash. Wube was thus able to control all the caravan routes to the Red Sea, although his claim to the Ottoman controlled port of Massawa was unsuccessful. The control of these routes opened new opportunities for him to acquire important goods, such as firearms and other weapons, and to establish relations with foreign powers.

=== Rebellions ===
Kassai Sabagadis; the governor of Agame and son of late Sabagadis Woldu, rose several times in rebellion against Wube in 1838. Kassai escaped Wube's wrath early that year when the warlord stopped pursuing the fleeing rebel over the Tembien mountains. In the second half of 1838, Wube left Tigray with his main army and crossed the Tekeze into Semien in anticipation of an attack by the regent Ras Ali II on his dominion. In the absence of Wube; Kassai Sabagadis once again raised the standard of revolt, and this time took control of nearly all of Tigray. Wube recrossed the Tekeze and ended Kassai's rebellion. Kassai Sabagadis was put in chains and remained Wube's prisoner for over 15 years until Tewodros II freed him.

Another son of Sabagadis, Dejazmach Gwangul Sabagadis from Agame was defeated by Wube in the second half of 1841 following his rebellion, Gwangul escaped with his life by fleeing into the salt plain deserts of Taltals.

Merso Haile Maryam served as the governor of Tembien until he turned against his brother Wube, and after having devastated parts of Lasta (governed under Wube's ally) then threatened to march on his brothers dominion. However, when faced by the army of Wube, Merso fled into Yejiu territory.

=== Foreign contacts ===
Cloth painting of Wube (right) meeting Abuna Salama III, c. 1855

When Wube occupied Tigray, he found a small group of Anglican-sponsored Protestant missionaries, who tried to awake a reformist movement within the Orthodox Christian Church of the Ethiopians. In 1838 he expelled these missionaries and established relations with the French-sponsored Lazarist mission, especially with Justin de Jacobis (later canonized as the “apostle of the Abyssinians”). The Catholic missionaries seem to have cultivated Wubé’s hope that he could count on the help of France in his power struggle with the other Ethiopian princes, as diplomatic letters show. The French traveler Theophile Lefebvre influenced Wube to send a delegation (led by Lefebvre himself) to the French monarch Louis Philippe I in a bid to secure French support. By the middle of 1841 Lefebvre returned to Wube's court from France and delivered a present from the French monarch; a small quantity of imported guns and a number of artisans which helped Wube in the production and repairs of military equipment.

In addition, a mission sent by Wube to Egypt to acquire a new Coptic metropolitan for Ethiopia (the last metropolitan had died in the 1820s) was successful. In 1841 the See of Alexandria sent a young monk, who was consecrated as the new patriarch of the Ethiopian Orthodox Church under the name of “Abuna Salama III.”

Wube also arranged for completion of the ongoing building of Dirasge Mariam Church for his coronation. His status is underpinned by his being exempted from the usual requirement of vassals to attend the court of Ras Ali II, regent to the Emperor of Ethiopia.

In 1841, That same year, Wube defeated Ras Ali II in battle, taking Gondar, the then capital of Ethiopia. Nonetheless, Ras Ali II escaped. In February 1842, their armies clashed again in the Battle of Debre Tabor, where Wube's initial tactical superiority from imported firearms almost carried the day, until a detachment under Dejazmach Birru Aligaz, Ras Ali's uncle, went to pay homage with his forces to Wube's encampment but found him very intoxicated, also without guards and took him prisoner, thus enabling Ali to retain his title.

Although Ras Ali II and Wube continued to have some tension, they avoided any serious clash as there was constant threat from Egyptian rulers from the north. Subsequently, Wube was unsuccessful in his efforts to take Massawa and in 1844 withdrew inland, finally leaving Tigray in 1846. Kassa Hailu later definitively defeated Ali II in the Battle of Ayshal, 29 June 1853, whereupon Ali fled to Raya where he lived the rest of his life.

== Defeat and death ==
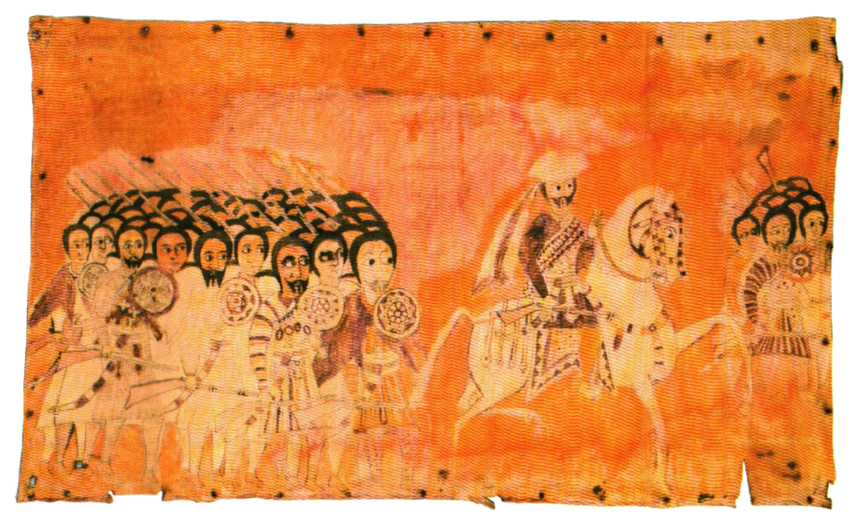
Ras Wube (mounted) on a painting from c. 1880

Some sources date the ending of Zemene Mesafint era, during which Ethiopia lacked effective central authority from approximately 1769 to approximately 1855, to Ras Ali II's defeat at the Battle of Ayshal in 1853, after which Kassa became the de facto ruler of Ethiopia. However, other sources denote the ending of the Zemene Mesafint as Wube's defeat in 1855, as the last remaining autonomous regional ruler. On 9 February 1855, Wube's army was defeated by Kassa Hailu and Wube was captured and imprisoned. Within a few days, Kassa, who had previously been titled as a Negus, was finally crowned Emperor Tewodros II, ironically by Abuna Salama III in the Dirasge Mariam Church. Although some sources suggest that Wube may have died in 1855, it is more commonly accepted that he spent the later part of his years in prison and died in 1867.
