= Ali II of Yejju =

Ethiopian noble (1819–1866)

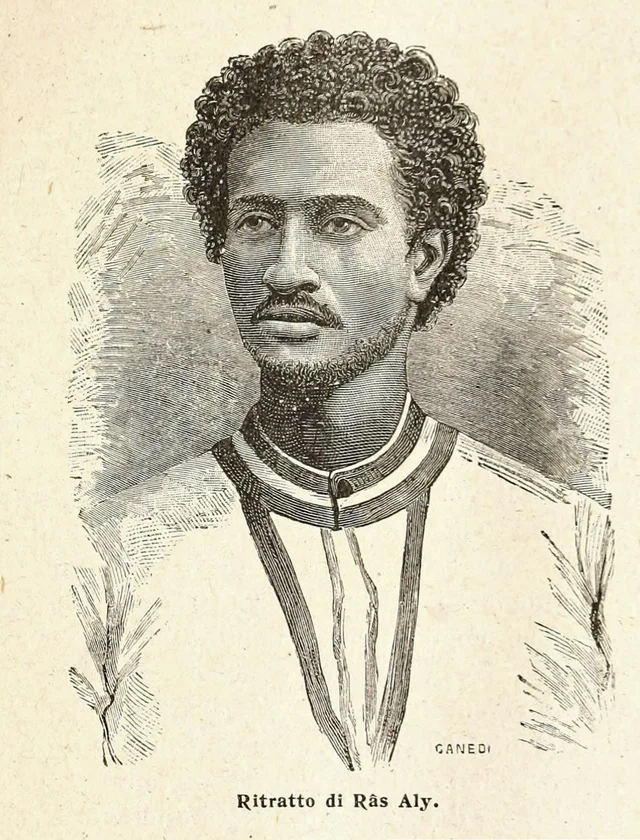

Ras of Begemder
- Reign: 1831 – 1853
- Predecessor: Ras Dori
- Successor: Kassa Hailu
- Born: 1819; Debre Tabor, Begemder, Ethiopian Empire
- Died: 1866 (aged 46–47); Wollo, Ethiopian Empire
- Spouse: Hirut
- Issue: Tewabech Ali
- Dynasty: Warra Sheik
- Father: Alula of Yejju
- Mother: Menen Liben Amede

Ali II of Yejju (c. 1819 – c. 1866) was Ras of Begemder and the de facto ruler of the Ethiopian Empire. He was a member of a powerful Wollo Yejju dynasty known as the Yejju, which ruled much of the Ethiopian Empire during the Zemene Mesafint.

== Appointment as ruler ==
In July 1831, after the death of his cousin, Ras Dori, Ali was appointed Ruler of Begemder and Imperial Regent at the age of 12 in a meeting of the chief nobles of the Yejju Oromo at the dynastic capital of Debre Tabor. As Ali was a minor, a council of regents was appointed from these nobles. However, his mother, Menen Liben Amede, soon came to control this council and exerted much influence over political decisions for the next decade.

Ras Ali was officially a Christian but some of his contemporaries doubted the sincerity of his faith and suspected that he was a secret Muslim. Some modern scholars consider him as indifferent to religion as he was to the problems of ruling his portion of Ethiopia, although Trimingham observes that he attempted to revive the cult of Ahmad ibn Ibrahim by requiring pilgrimages to his tomb. In any case, the morale of the Ethiopian Church reached its lowest point in the 1840s and 1850s.

For much his reign Ras Ali was constantly at war, either putting down rebellions in his core territories, or defending his territory from rival lords. In one of these continual campaigns, Ras Ali II plundered the imperial capital, Gondar, in 1838.

Ras Ali made Sahle Dengel Emperor in 1832, but the clergy of Azezo disapproved of the new Emperor's religious beliefs, and convinced Ras Ali to remove him. Sahle Dengel was sent to Zengaj, and Ras Ali recalled Gebre Krestos from the island of Mitraha in Lake Tana, and restored him as Emperor. However, Gebre Krestos died after three months, and Sahle Dengel met with Ras Ali in the village of Tsagur where he convinced Ras Ali to restore him to the throne once again (October, 1832).

== Marriage ==
Ras Ali married Hirut, the daughter of Dejazmach Wube Haile Maryam, lord of Semien and of Tigray; when he placed her in the church of Mahdere Maryam for her safety before the Battle of Debre Tabor (6 February 1842), his opponents violated the refuge of the church and kidnapped her. Their only daughter Tewabech was married 1848 to Kassa Hailu of Qwara, who in 1854 proclaimed himself a Negus. They had no surviving issue.

== End of reign ==
Although his reign was punctuated by recurrent rebellions, Ali managed to keep all of the major lords subject to his rule until the final years. Shiferaw Bekele asserts that "it is to his credit" that there were only two major wars while he was Ras Bewodded: the Battle of Debre Tabor in 1842, and Kassa Hailu's successful offensive in 1852/1853.

Future events were foreshadowed in October, 1846, when Kassa Hailu defeated detachments of Empress Menen's army at two separate battles in Dembiya; at the time, Ras Ali was away in Gojjam attempting to subdue the province's warlord, Birru Goshu, and unable to assist his mother. Kassa defeated the army of Empress Menen the following year on 18 June at Iloha, and took both Menen and her husband the former Emperor Yohannes III captive, forcing Ras Ali to negotiate their release. After three months, in return for making Kassa dejazmach over Dembiya, north of Lake Tana, the Empress and her powerless husband were released. Dejazmach Kassa later reconciled himself to Ras Ali in 1849, and Kassa remained loyal to Ali for the next three years.

However, the relationship between the two eventually deteriorated. Following a series of stunning victories by Kassa, Ali II was decisively defeated by his son-in-law Dejazmach Kassa (who later assumed the throne name of Tewodros II) in the Battle of Ayshal on 29 June 1853, and he lost both the regentship and his territories. At first, Ali fled to safety at a local church, then a few days later fled to the territories of his kinsmen in Wollo province, where he disappeared from history. Both Proutky and Trimingham give the date of 1866 for his death, without further details.

== Notes ==
| Preceded by Ras Dori | Chief of the Yejju | Succeeded by none |
