= Tewabech Ali =

Wife of Emperor of Ethiopia (1831–1858)

Tewabech Ali (1831 – 19 August 1858) was the first wife of Kassa Haile, better known as Emperor Tewodros II of Ethiopia. They were married in 1848.

Although she was offered as a bride to Kassa by her grandmother, Empress Menen Liben Amede, entirely for political reasons, he loved her and was faithful to her until her death. This is shown by the fact they made their wedding official by partaking of Communion together at the same time he was proclaimed Emperor.

She died in Wollo while Emperor Tewodros was campaigning against rebels in that province. They had no children, and after she died reportedly his British friend John Bell had to persuade Tewodros that a second marriage was not against the teaching of the Bible.

Some historians like Paul B. Henze, believe Tewabech had a positive effect on Tewodros, and his violent and erratic behavior in the last ten years of his reign was due in part to the lack of advice from her, and other advisors like John Bell and Walter Plowden (who were killed in 1860's).
