= Battle of Ayshal =

1853 conflict in Ethiopia between Tewodros II and Ras Ali II

- Part of Zemene Mesafint
Date	29 June 1853; 173 years ago
Location	Ayshal, Gojjam
Result	Victory for Kassa Hailu

Belligerents
Loyalists to Kassa Hailu	Loyalists to Ras Ali

Commanders and leaders
Kassa Hailu	Ras Ali

The Battle of Ayshal was fought on 29 June 1853, between the forces of Kassa Hailu and the forces of Ras Ali II, in Ayshal, in eastern Gojjam. Kassa's forces won the battle.

The popularity of Kassa continued to grow as he defeated several nobles one after another, including Dejazmach Birru Goshu, Birru Aligaz and Belew. Birru Aligaz and Belew were defeated in the battle of Taqussa, that enraged Ras Ali. Finally, Ras Ali and Kassa fought the battle in Ayshal. The charges of Ras Ali's host and the Gojjame army were at first advancing against Kassa's army but they were only smashed when Welde-Kidan who rallied and lead the army from the front, was shot and fell from his horse, dying instantly. Kassa who saw the shock of the enemy, entered the middle of the battle and rallied his own army and Due to his personal bravery the tide of victory turned. When it became apparent that Kassa was about to be victorious, Ras Ali was among the first to flee from the battlefield, heading to Yeju. According to traditional Ethiopian history, the battle of Ayshal marks the end of the Zemene Mesafint.
