= Tewodros II =

Emperor of Ethiopia from 1855 to 1868

Tewodros II ዳግማዊ ቴዎድሮስ
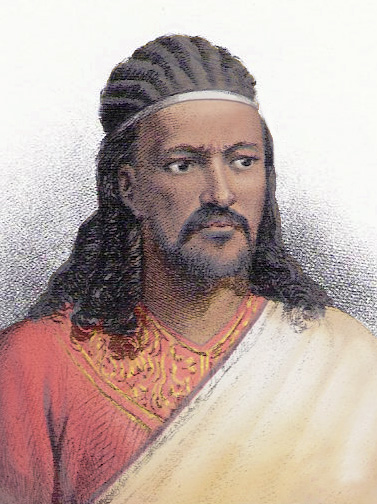
- Tewodros II depicted in Histoire de l'Ethiopie d'Axoum à la révolution

Emperor of Ethiopia
- Reign: 11 February 1855 – 15 April 1868
- Coronation: 11 February 1855
- Predecessor: Sahle Dengel
- Successor: Tekle Giyorgis II
- Born: c. 1818; Qwara, Ethiopian Empire
- Died: 15 April 1868 (aged 49–50); Amba Mariam, Wollo Province, Ethiopian Empire
- Burial: Medhane Alem Church, Amba Mariam (originally called Magdala); Mahbere Selassie Convent, Qwara (currently)
- Spouse: Tewabech Ali; Tiruwork Wube
- Issue: Prince Alemayehu
Names
- Kassa (birth name)
- Dynasty: House of Solomon (claimed)
- Father: Haile Giorgis Wolde Giorgis
- Mother: Woizero Atitegeb Wondbewossen
- Religion: Ethiopian Orthodox Church

Styles of Tewodros II of Ethiopia
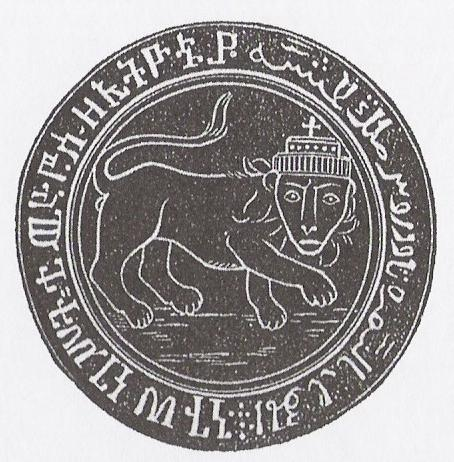
- Reference style: His Imperial Majesty; Amharic: ግርማዊ; girmāwī
- Spoken style: Your Imperial Majesty; Amharic: ጃንሆይ; djānhoi; lit. "O [esteemed] royal"
- Alternative style: Our Lord (familiar); Amharic: ጌቶቹ; getochu; lit. "Our master" (pl.)

Tewodros II (Ge'ez: ዳግማዊ ቴዎድሮስ, once referred to by the English cognate Theodore; baptized as Kassa, c. 1818 – 15 April 1868) was Emperor of Ethiopia from 1855 until his death in 1868. His rule is often placed as the beginning of modern Ethiopia and brought an end to the decentralized Zemene Mesafint (Era of the Princes).

Although Tewodros II's origins were in the Era of the Princes, his ambitions were not those of the regional nobility. He sought to re-establish a cohesive Ethiopian state and to reform its administration and church.

Tewodros II's first task after having reunited the other provinces was to bring Shewa under his control. During the Era of the Princes, Shewa was, even more than most provinces, an independent entity, its ruler even styling himself Negus, the title for King. In the course of subduing the Shewans, Tewodros took with him a Shewan prince, Sahle Maryam, who he brought up as his own son, who would later become Emperor (or Atse) himself as Menelik II. Despite his success against Shewa, Tewodros faced constant rebellions by nobles in other regions resisting modernization.

In the first six years of his reign, the new ruler managed to put down these rebellions, and the empire was relatively peaceful from about 1861 to 1863, but the energy, wealth, and manpower necessary to deal with regional opposition limited the scope of Tewodros's other activities. Tewodros II never realized his dream of restoring a strong monarchy, although he took many important initial steps. He sought to establish the principle that governors and judges must be salaried appointees. He also established a professional standing army, rather than depending on local lords to provide soldiers for his expeditions. He introduced the collection of books in the form of a library, tax codes, as well as a centralized political system with respective administrative districts. He also intended to reform the church but he was confronted by strong opposition when he tried to impose a tax on church lands to help finance government activities. Tewodros's confiscation of these lands gained him enemies in the church and little support elsewhere. Essentially, Tewodros was a talented military campaigner.

He ultimately committed suicide at the Battle of Magdala, during the British Expedition to Abyssinia.

== Description ==
The British Consul Walter Plowden knew well the political events of Ethiopia during the 1850s and had foretold the rising star of Kassa the freelance warrior from Qwara.

When being crowned as King, Plowden described him as such:

The King Theodorus is young in years, vigorous in all manly exercises, of a striking countenance, peculiarly polite and engaging when pleased, and mostly displaying great tact and delicacy. He is persuaded that he is destined to restore the glories of the Ethiopian Empire and to achieve great conquests: of untiring energy, both mental and bodily, his personal and moral daring is boundless... When aroused his wrath is terrible, and all tremble; but at all moments he possesses a perfect self-control. Indefatigable in business, he takes little repose night or day: his ideas and language are clear and precise; hesitation is not known to him; and has no counsellors or go-between. He is fond of splendour, and received in state even on a campaign. He is unsparing in punishment – necessary in a wilderness as Abyssinia (at that time). He salutes his meanest (poor) subjects with courtesy, is sincerely though often mistakenly religious, and will acknowledge a fault committed to his poorest follower in a moment of compassion with sincerity and grace. He is generous to excess, and free from all cupidity, regarding nothing with pleasure or desire but munitions of war for his soldiers. He has exercised the utmost clemency towards the vanquished, treating them more like friends than enemies. His faith is signal: without Christ I am nothing.

The French explorer, geographer, ethnologist, linguist and astronomer Antoine Thomson D'Abbadie describes him during his stay in Ethiopia:

I saw Kasa, or Theodore, frequently at Gondar in 1848. He was dressed as a simple soldier, and had nothing, either in his features or language, which presaged his high destiny. He loved to speak of fire-arms. He was about twenty-eight years old; his face rather black than red; his figure slim; and his agility seemed to arise less from his muscular power than from that of his will. His forehead is high and almost convex; his nose slightly aquiline, a frequent characteristic of the pure-blooded Amaras.

The British geographer Clements Markham, mentioned the following about him:

Theodore, the new King of Kings of Ethiopia, was certainly the most remarkable man that has appeared in Africa for some centuries. At the date of his assumption of the regal title, Theodore was thirty-seven years of age, of medium stature but possessing a well-knit muscular frame capable of ensuring any amount of fatigue – a noble bearing and a majestic walk – and he was the best shot, the best spearmen, the best runner, and the best horseman in Abyssinia. He was a genius, and a very remarkable one. It is a misuse of terms to call him a savage, except in the sense that Peter the Great was a savage. They were both born kings of men; both endowed with military genius; both lovers of the mechanical arts; both possessed of dauntless courage; and, while capable of noble and generous acts, both were frequently guilty of perpetrating most horrible atrocities.

The French traveler Émile Jonveaux, described him as:

The Négus Theodore, King of the kings of Ethiopia, had none of the insignia of sovereign majesty. Clothed very simply, he handled the pickaxe and the hammer like the lowest of his workmen, with the view of encouraging them by his example. He was in all things the man of energy, the fierce hero, of whom M. Lejean, who knew him intimately enough to call him his "terrible friend," has traced so life-like a portrait. He was about fifty years of age; of medium stature, with muscular limbs, a swarthy complexion, and features of remarkable beauty.

The English explorer Tristram Speedy who met him at his camp said as follows:

Theodore was reclining on a couch in the porch of his tent, and from under the cushions protruded the hilt of a sabre, and the butt of a brace of pistols, the prized gifts as I afterwards learnt of the late Consul Plowden. The King was above 5'10" in height, well proportioned and muscular, dark complexioned, with eyes of unusual brilliancy. His massive black curly hair was plaited in fine high ridges from the forehead to the nape of the neck while the ends to the length of 8 inches hung down his back in curls.

== Early life ==
Kassa Hailu was born in Qwara, west of Gondar. His father was an Amhara nobleman of the Qwara district named Hailegiorgis Woldegiorgis. His paternal grandfather, Dejazmatch Woldegiorgis, was a widely respected figure of his time. Dembiya was part of the large territory known as Ye Maru Qemas, which translates as "the taste of the honey" or literally "what has been tasted by Maru". This name was given to the territory because it was the personal fief of Dejazmach Maru, a powerful warlord, and relative of Kassa. When Maru died in October 1827, his fiefdom was given (albeit begrudgingly) to Dejazmach Hailu by the governor of the province, Empress Menen Liben Amede. Kassa was in line to potentially take control of Ye Maru Qemas after Kenfu's death (though Kenfu also wanted to give the land to his own sons). When Kenfu died, however, neither his sons nor Kassa inherited control of the territory because Empress Menen Liben re-annexed it under her own control.

According to the Ethiopian chronicles, Kassa's mother, Woizero Atitegeb Wondbewossen, was from Gondar and belonged to a noble family. However, According to Hormuzd Rassam, she was originally from Amhara Sayint. Her mother, Woizero Tishal, was a member of a noble family of Begemder, while her paternal grandfather, Ras Wodajo, was a powerful and highly influential figure. It is thought that Tewodros II's paternal side of the family carried with it a slim margin of Solomonic pedigree, however insignificant it proved when compared to the more prominently illustrious ancestries of some of his highborn rivals. Tewodros, in his reign, indeed claimed that his father was descended from Emperor Fasilides by way of a daughter.

When Kassa was very young, his parents divorced and Woizero Atitegeb moved back to Gondar taking her son with her. Not long after their departure, however, news reached them that Kassa's father had died. Popular legend states that Kassa's paternal relatives split up the entire paternal inheritance, leaving young Kassa and his mother with nothing and in very dire circumstances financially. In hard times, his enemies came up with a rumour that she was reduced to selling Kosso – a claim for which Kassa would go on to imprison Henry Aaron Stern for publishing during his reign. There is actually no evidence that Woizero Atitegeb was ever a Kosso seller, and several writers such as Paulos Ngo Ngo have stated outright that it was a false rumor spread by her detractors. Evidence indicates that Woizero Atitegeb was fairly well-to-do, and indeed had inherited considerable land holdings from her own illustrious relatives from which to lead a comfortable life. Kassa's youth was probably not lived lavishly, but he was far from a pauper.

Kassa was sent to school at the convent of Tekla Haymanot, between Gondar and Lake Tana. He took refuge when it was sacked by a defeated Dejazmatch Wube, who by burning and dismembering the children, took vengeance on their victorious parents. Kassa escaped and fled to the protection of his kinsman, Dejazmach Kenfu Hailu, probably his uncle, but believed to be his half-brother. He continued his formal education and became familiar with the Bible and Ethiopian literature. He also received instruction on the techniques of Ethiopian warfare from Kenfu. When Kenfu died, and his two sons were defeated by another dajazmach (earl), Dajazmach Goshu of Damot and Gojjam, Kassa was forced to make another start in life, and offered his services to Goshu. Later, Kassa would confront and decisively defeat Dejazmatch Wube —the very man whose earlier actions had set him on this new path and was the last person he had to defeat thus allowing to take on his kingly name Tewodros II

== Rise to power ==
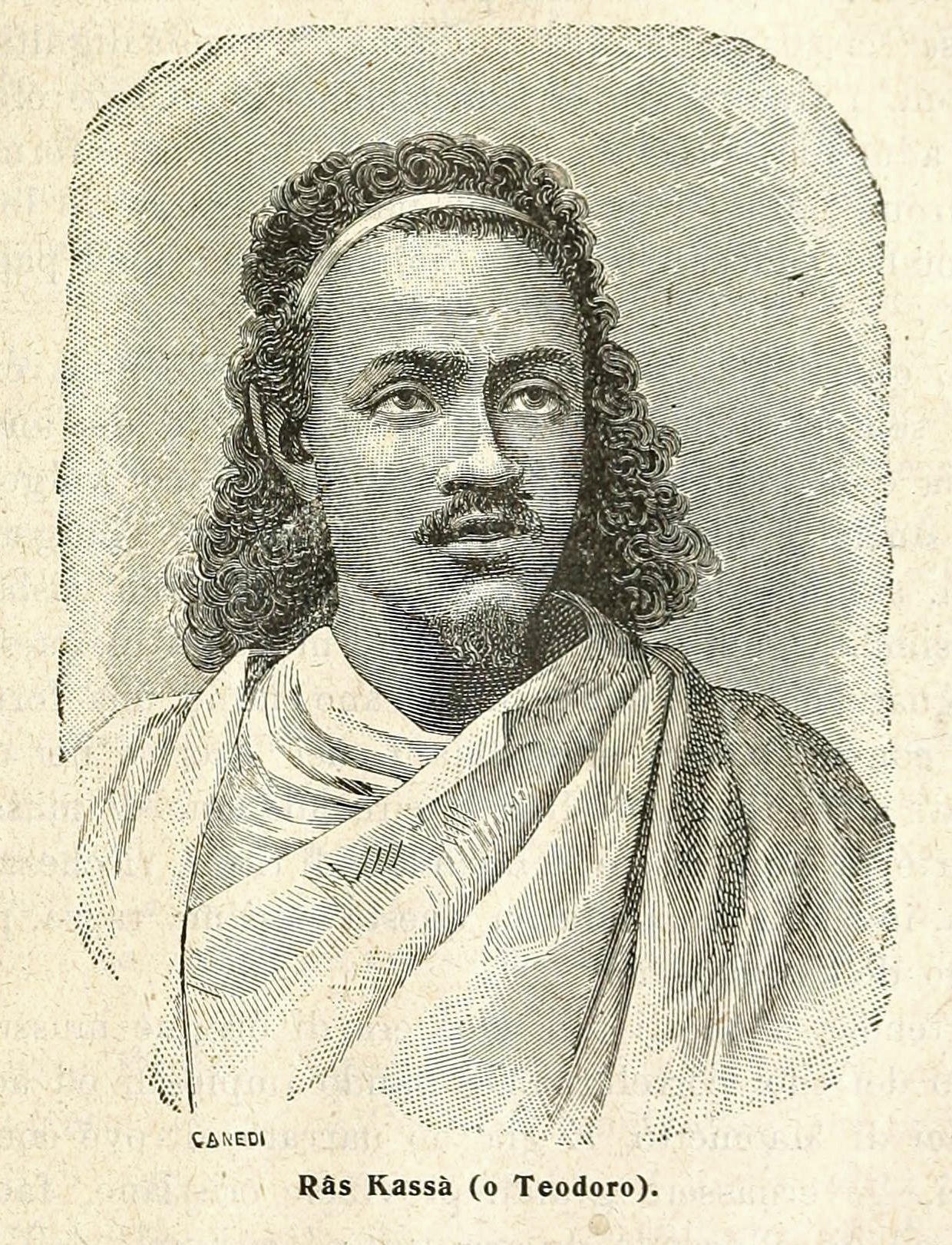
Italian depiction of Ras Kassa c. 1850

Kassa Hailu was born into a country rife with civil war, and he defeated many regional noblemen and princes before becoming emperor during time known as the Zemene Mesafint or "Age of the Princes". During this era, regional princes, and noble lords of diverse ethnic and religious backgrounds vied with each other for power and control of the Gondarine Emperor. A puppet Emperor of the Solomonic dynasty was enthroned in Gondar by one nobleman, only to be dethroned and replaced by another member of the Imperial dynasty when a different regional prince was able to seize Gondar and the reins of power. Regions such as Gojjam and Shewa were ruled by their own branches of the Imperial dynasty and, in Shewa, the local prince went as far as assuming the title of King. In Wollo, competing royal powerful Oromo and Muslim dynasties also vied for power. Nevertheless, a semblance of order and unity was maintained in northern Ethiopia during the era of the Princes by the powerful Rases of the Were Sheik dynasty of Wollo such as Ras Ali the Great and Ras Gugsa who controlled Gondar and the Emperor.

Kassa began his career in this era as a shifta (outlaw), but after amassing a sizable force of followers, was able to not only restore himself to his father's previous fiefdom of Qwara but was able to control all of Dembiya. Moreover, he gained popular support by his benevolent treatment of the inhabitants in the areas he controlled: according to Sven Rubenson, Kassa "shared out captured grain and money to the peasants in Qwara and told them to buy hoes and plant." This garnered notice of the nobleman in control of Gondar, Ras Ali II of Yejju of Wollo. Empress Menen Liben Amede, wife of Emperor Yohannes III, and the mother of Ras Ali, arranged for Kassa to marry her granddaughter, Tewabech Ali. She awarded him all of Ye Meru Qemas in the hopes of binding him firmly to her son and herself.

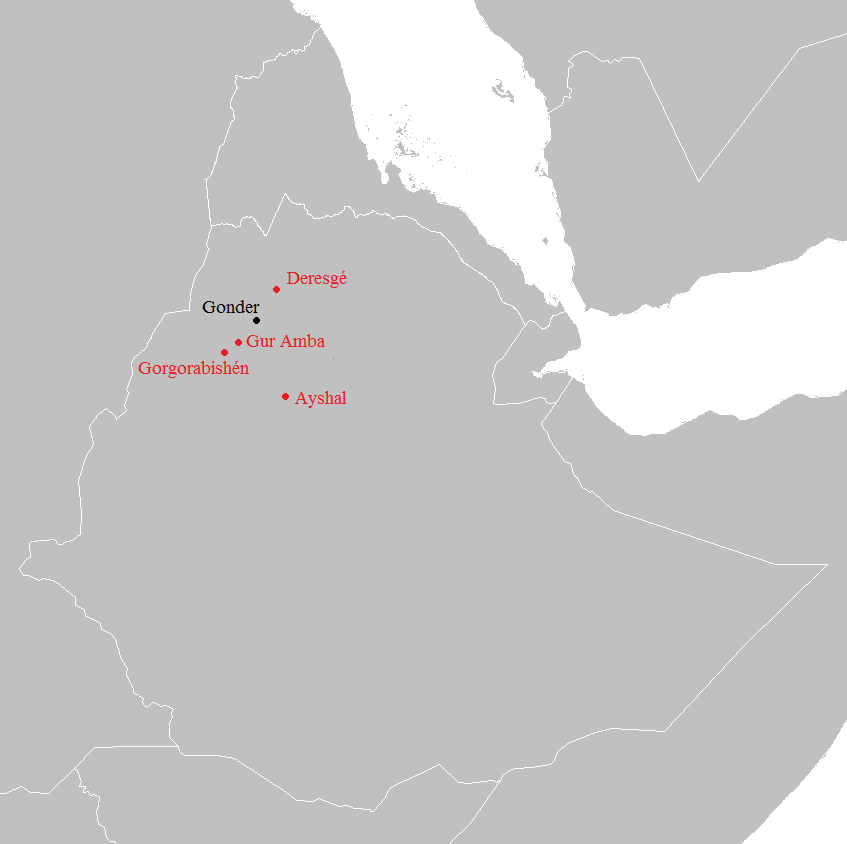
Location of the four main battles of Ras Kassa from 1853 to 1855

Although all sources and authorities believe that Kassa truly loved and respected his wife, his relationship with his new in-laws deteriorated largely because of the disdainful treatment he repeatedly received from the Empress Menen. By 1852, he rebelled against Ras Ali and, in a series of victories – Gur Amaba, Takusa, Ayshal, and Amba Jebelli – over the next three years he defeated every army the Ras and the Empress sent against him. At Ayshal he captured the Empress Menen, and Ras Ali fled. Kassa announced that he was deposing Emperor Yohannes III, and then marched on his greatest remaining rival, Dejazmach Wube Haile Maryam of Semien. Kassa refused to acknowledge an attempt to restore the former Emperor Sahle Dengel in the place of the hapless Yohannes III who had acknowledged Kassa immediately. Yohannes III was treated well by Kassa who seems to have had some personal sympathy for him. His views on Sahle Dengel are not known but are not likely to have been sympathetic. Following the defeat of Dejazmach Wube, Kassa was crowned Emperor by Abuna Salama III in the church of Derasge Maryam on February 11, 1855. He took the throne name of Tewodros II, attempting to fulfill a prophecy that a man named Tewodros would restore the Ethiopian Empire to greatness and rule for 40 years.

== Military skills ==
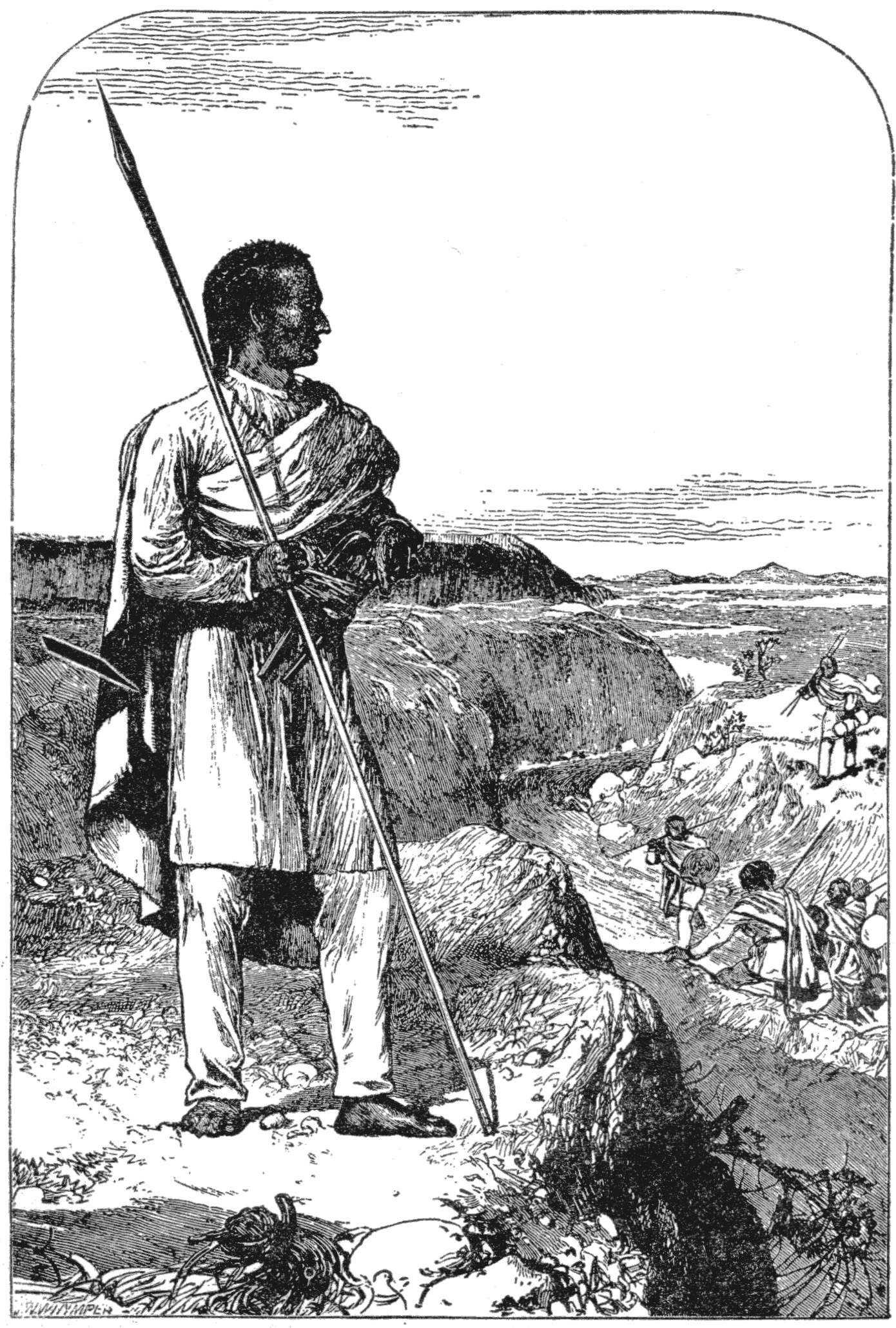
Emperor Tewodros II supervising crossing of the Blue Nile

Tewodros II's military career started when he served in his relative, Kenfu Haile Giorgis', army. In 1837, he led a successful attack on Ottoman forces in the town of Gallabat and fought in the Battle of Wadkaltabu where he helped defeat an Egyptian raid. His uncle, Dejazmach Kenfu died in 1839 and Qwara was lost to the family and claimed by Empress Menen of Gondar. Kassa Hailu resorted to become a shifta, one who refuses to recognize his feudal lord. Kassa Hailu organized his own army in the plains of Qwara. When he became too powerful to ignore, as a way to deal with him without using force, he was named Dajazmach of Qwara and given the hand of Tawabach, the daughter of Ras Ali of Begemder, in 1845.

Kassa was very close to Tawabach and devoted to his marriage but his submission to Empress Menen was short-lived. In October 1846, he attacked and plundered Dembea, a city located due south of Gondar, and in January 1847 he went on to occupy Gondar. When Kassa unoccupied Gondar later that year, Empress Menen sent an army after him into north of Lake Tana. Kassa easily defeated the army and took the Empress as prisoner. Her son, Ras Ali of Begemder, chose to negotiate with Kassa; he gave Kassa all lands west and north of Lake Tana and Kassa in return released his mother (Prouty and Rosenfeld 1982, 60). The reconciled relationship with Empress Menen led him to join up with Ras Ali and Ras Goshu Zewde of Gojam. However, when conflict re-emerged yet again in 1852, Kassa retreated back to Qwara to re-strengthen his troops.

In 1842 Tewodros invaded Egyptian-controlled Sudan from western Ethiopia, successfully capturing Metemma. However, he suffered a major defeat in March 1848 at the Battle of Dabarki, effectively ending his invasion. The defeat at Dabarki led to Tewodros taking efforts to modernize his military, incorporating firearm drills and more modern artillery.

== Reign ==
Cloth painting from Adwa showing Tewodros' coronation by Abuna Salama III in 1855

Tewodros sought to unify and modernise Ethiopia. However, since he was nearly always away on campaign during his tenure as emperor, disloyal leaders frequently tried to dislodge him while he was away fighting. Within a few years, he had forcibly brought back under direct Imperial rule the Kingdom of Shewa and the province of Gojjam. He crushed the many lords and princes of Wollo and Tigray and brought recalcitrant regions of Begemder and Simien under his direct rule.

He moved the capital city of the Empire from Gondar, first to Debre Tabor, and later to Magdala. Tewodros ended the division of Ethiopia among the various regional lords and princes that had vied among each other for power for almost two centuries. He forcibly re-incorporated the regions of Gojjam, Tigre, Shewa and Wollo under the direct administration of the Imperial throne after they had been ruled by local branches of the Imperial dynasty (in Gojjam and Shewa) or other noblemen (Wollo). With all of his rivals apparently subdued, he imprisoned them and their relatives at Magdala. Among the royal and aristocratic prisoners at Magdala was the young Prince of Shewa, Sahle Maryam, the future Emperor Menelik II. Tewodros doted on the young prince, and married him to his own daughter Alitash Tewodros. Menelik would eventually escape from Magdala, and abandon his wife, offending Tewodros deeply.

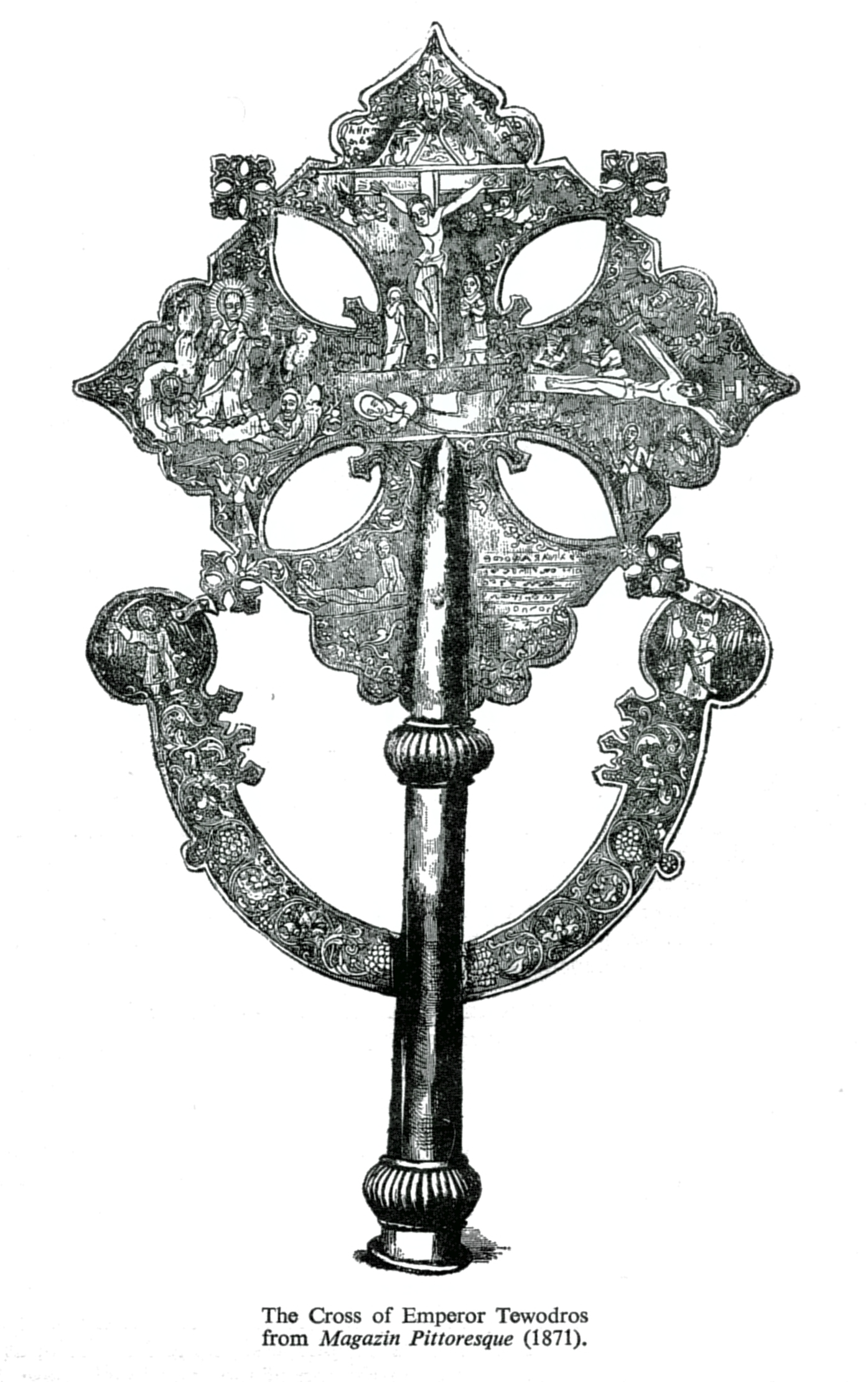
The Cross of Emperor Tewodros II.

The death of his beloved wife, Empress Tewabech, marked the start of a deterioration in Tewodros II's behavior. Increasingly erratic and vengeful, he gave full rein to some of his more brutal tendencies now that the calming influence of his wife was absent. For instance, after the murder of the English traveller, John Bell, who had become the emperor's close friend and confidante, the emperor, in revenge, had 500 prisoners beheaded in Debarek. Then, in February 1863, after defeating the rebel, Tedla Gwalu, Tewodros ordered the killing of the 7,000 prisoners he had taken.

Tewodros II remarried, this time to the daughter of his imprisoned enemy Dejazmach Wube. The new Empress, Tiruwork Wube was a proud and haughty woman, very aware of her illustrious Solomonic ancestry. She is said to have intended on the religious life and becoming a nun, especially after the fall of her father and his imprisonment along with her brothers at the hands of Tewodros II. However, Tewodros's request for her hand in marriage was seen by her family as an opportunity to get Dejazmatch Wube and his sons freed from imprisonment, and so they prevailed on her to marry the Emperor. However, while the conditions of their imprisonment were eased, Dejazmatch Wube and his sons were not released, deeply imbittering Empress Tiruwork against Tewodros. Already feeling that she had married far beneath her dignity to a usurper, the failure of the Emperor to free her family did not help their marital relationship. The marriage was very far from a happy one, and was extremely stormy. They did have a son, Dejazmatch Alemayehu Tewodros, whom the Emperor adored and whom he regarded as his heir.

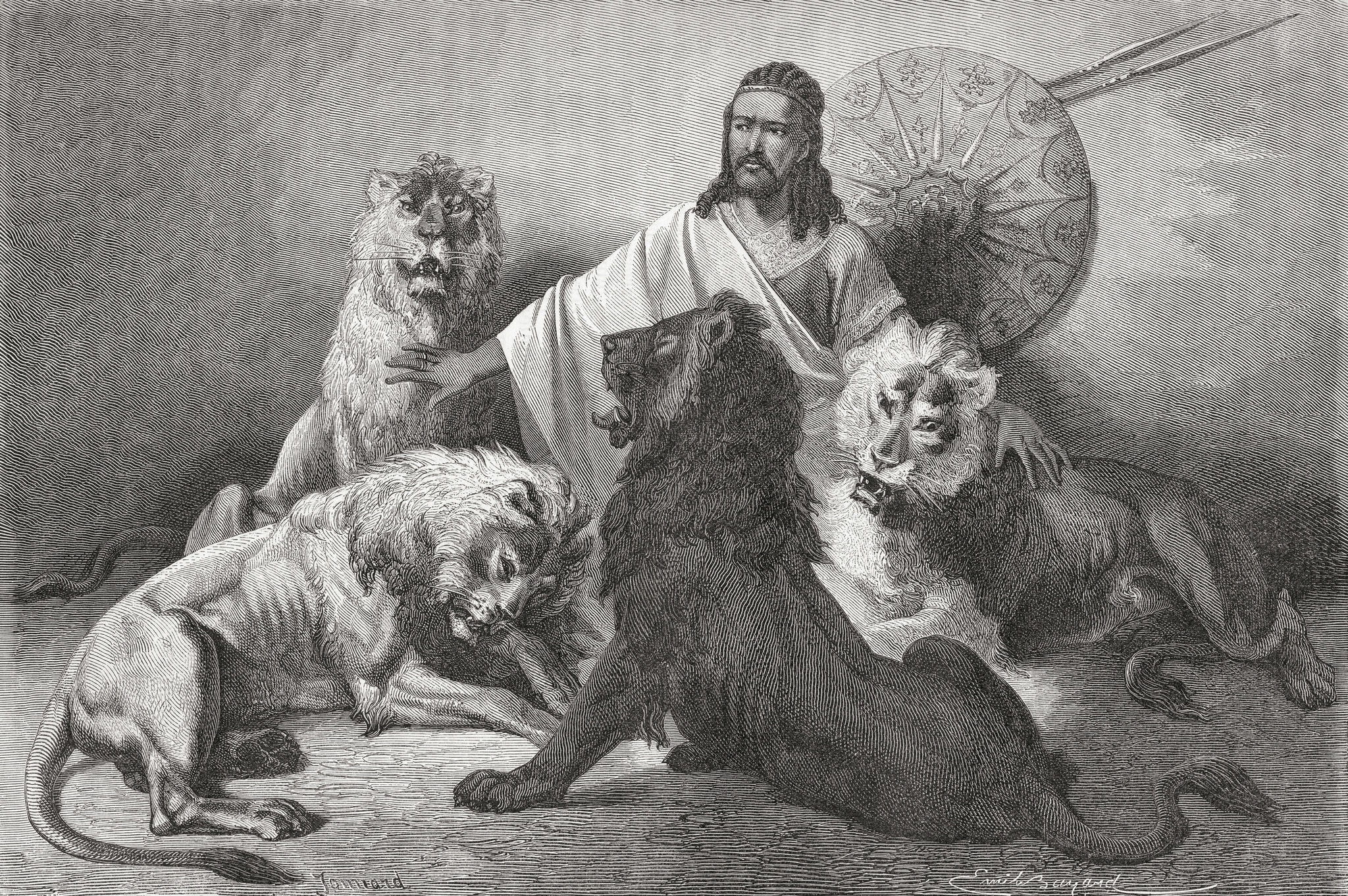
Theodore giving audience, surrounded by lions

By October 1862, Emperor Tewodros's position as ruler had become precarious, much of Ethiopia was in revolt against him, except for a small area stretching from Lake Tana east to his fortress at Magdala, Ethiopia. He was engaged in constant military campaigns against a wide array of rebels. Likewise, Abyssinia was also threatened by the encroachment of Islam as Muslim Turks and Egyptians repeatedly invaded Ethiopia from the Red Sea and from Sudan while the Muslim Oromo tribe was expanding throughout Central Ethiopia. Tewodros wrote a letter to Queen Victoria as a fellow Christian monarch, asking for British assistance in the region. Tewodros asked the British Consul in Ethiopia, Captain Charles Duncan Cameron, to carry a letter to Queen Victoria requesting skilled workers to come to teach his subjects how to produce firearms, and other technical skills. Cameron traveled to the coast with the letter, but when he informed the Foreign Office of the letter and its contents, he was instructed to simply send the letter to London rather than take it himself. He was to proceed to Sudan to make inquiries about the slave trade there. After doing this, Cameron returned to Ethiopia.

On Cameron's return, the Emperor became enraged when he found out that Cameron had not taken the letter to London personally, had not brought a response from the Queen, and most of all, had spent time travelling through enemy Egyptian and Turkish territories. Cameron tried to appease the Emperor saying that a reply to the letter would arrive shortly. The Foreign Office in London did not pass the letter to Queen Victoria, but simply filed it under Pending. There the letter stayed for a year. Then the Foreign Office sent the letter to India, because Abyssinia came under the Raj's remit. It is alleged that when the letter arrived in India, officials filed it under Not Even Pending.

Britain had several reasons for ignoring the letter. The British Empire's interests in Northeast Africa were quite different from those of Tewodros. The British did not want to conduct a Christian "crusade" against Islam but instead to cooperate politically, strategically and commercially with the Ottoman Empire, Egypt and the Sudan. This was not only to protect the route to India but also to ensure that the Ottoman Empire continued to act as a buffer against Russia's plans for expansion into Central Asia. More so, as a result of the American Civil War, deliveries of cotton from the American South to the British textile industry were cut off entirely, making the British increasingly dependent on Egyptian-Sudanese cotton. The British did not wish to see a conflagration in the region, which would upset the status quo.

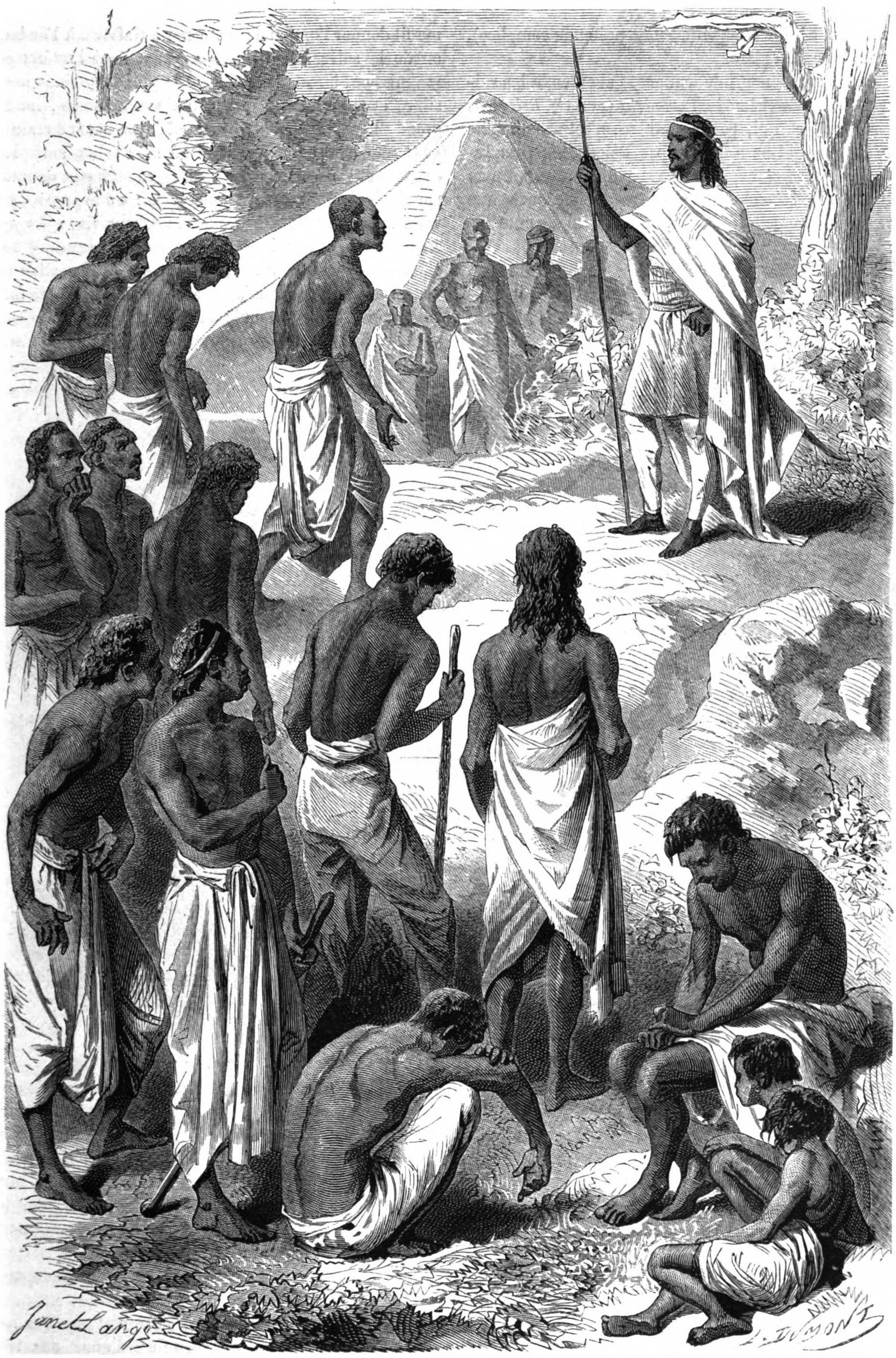
Ethiopian insurgents paying homage to Emperor Tewodros, c. 1868

After two years had passed and Tewodros had not received a reply, he imprisoned Cameron, together with all the British subjects in Ethiopia and various other Europeans, in an attempt to get the queen's attention. His prisoners included an Anglican missionary named Henry A. Stern, who had previously published a book in Europe describing Tewodros as a barbaric, cruel, unstable usurper. When Tewodros saw this book, he became violently angry, pulled a gun on Stern, and had to be restrained from killing the missionary. He then beat to death the two servants Stern had brought with him. Tewodros also received reports from abroad that foreign papers had quoted these European residents of Ethiopia as having said many negative things about him and his reign.

== Conflict with Great Britain ==
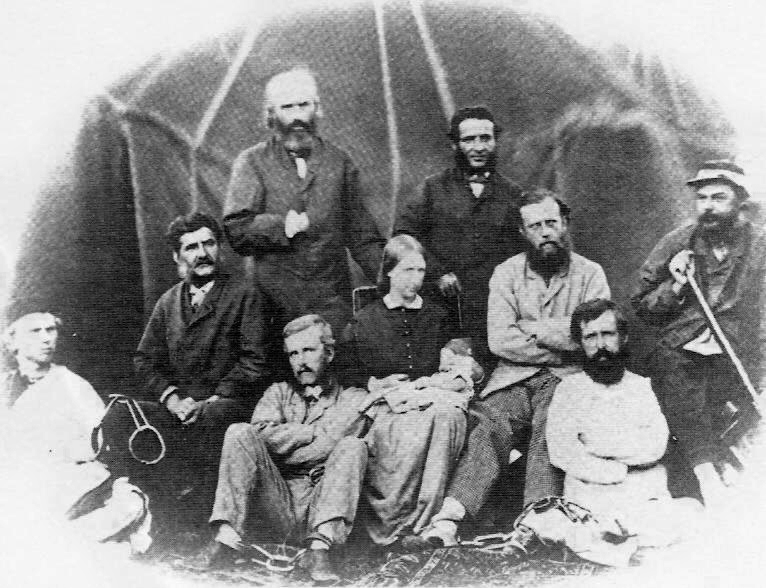
European prisoners in Magdala

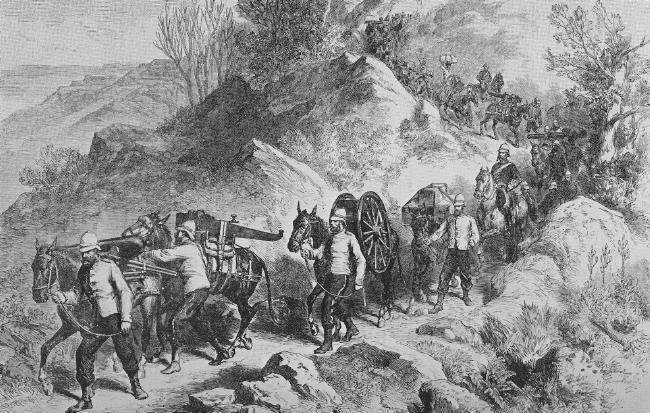
Departure of the British expeditionary force from Magdala (The Illustrated London News, 1868)

The British sent a mission under an Assyrian-born British subject, Hormuzd Rassam, who bore a letter from the Queen (in response to Tewodros's now three-year-old letter requesting aid). He did not bring the skilled workers as Tewodros had requested. Deeply insulted by the British failure to do exactly as they were asked, Tewodros had the members of the Rassam mission added to his other European prisoners. This last breach of diplomatic immunity was the catalyst to Britain launching the 1868 Expedition to Abyssinia under Robert Napier. He traveled from India, then a British colony, with more than 30,000 personnel (a force of 13,000 troops and 26,000 camp followers), which consisted of not only soldiers but also specialists such as engineers. Tewodros had become increasingly unpopular over the years due to his harsh methods, and many regional figures had rebelled against him. Several readily assisted the British by providing guides and food as the expeditionary force marched towards Magdala, where the Emperor had fortified the mountaintop.

The British force defeated the Abyssinian army at Arogye, on the plain facing Magdala, on 10 April 1868. With Tewodros's army so decisively defeated, many of his men began to desert and the emperor was left with only 4,000 soldiers. Tewodros II attempted to make peace. Napier responded with a message thanking him for this peace offering and stating that he would treat the Emperor and his family with every dignity. Tewodros II furiously responded that he would never be taken prisoner. The British shelled Magdala, which killed most of Tewodros's remaining soldiers. Tewodros released all of the Europeans unharmed but ordered 300 Ethiopian prisoners to be flung over the cliff.

On 15 April 1868, as the British troops stormed the citadel of Magdala, Emperor Tewodros committed suicide rather than surrender.

A modern commentator states "When Tewodros preferred self-inflicted death to captivity, he deprived the British of this ultimate satisfaction and laid the foundation for his own resurrection as a symbol of the defiant independence of the Ethiopian."

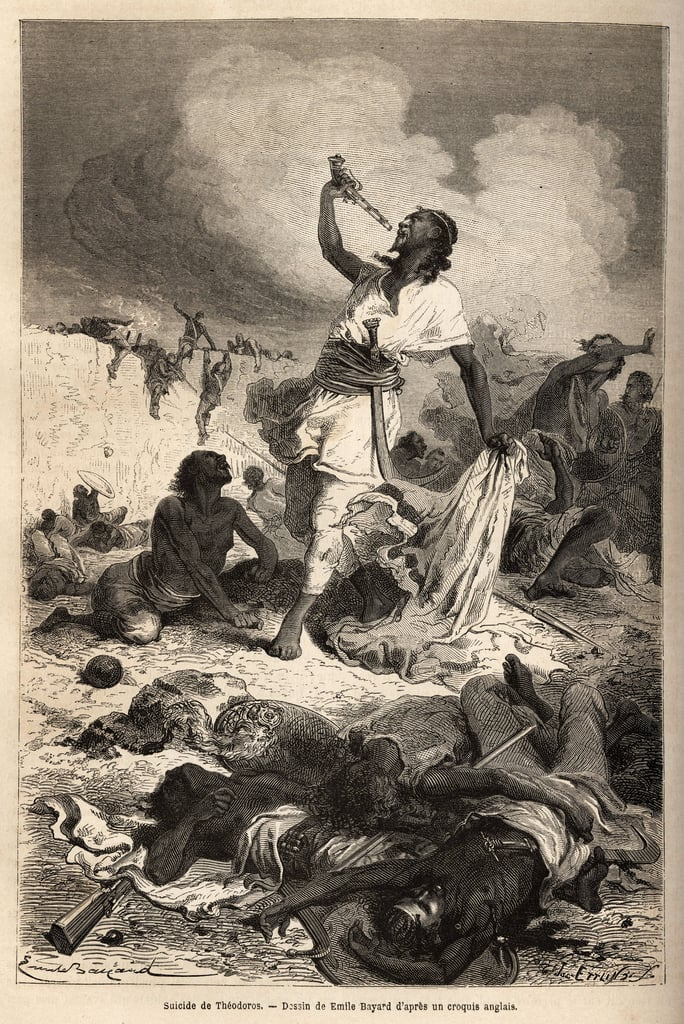
Emperor Tewodros commits suicide – as depicted by the media. As drawn by Emile Bayard after an English sketch

He has been said to have used a pistol that he had used during fighting for unification during the era, though in reality he used a duelling pistol gifted to him by Queen Victoria and presented by Consul Cameron. Tewodros II was buried by the British troops at Magdala's Medhane Alem (Savior of the World) Orthodox Church under the name of Theodore II. In 2019, the National Army Museum announced the return to Ethiopia of a lock of Tewodros's hair, taken after his death in battle. Magdala was in the territory of the Muslim Oromo tribes who had long before taken it from the Amhara people; however, Tewodros had won it back from them some years earlier. Two rival Oromos queens, Werqitu and Mostiat, had both allied themselves with the British and claimed control of the conquered fortress as a reward. Napier much preferred to hand Magdala over to the Christian ruler of Lasta, Wagshum Gobeze, because, if Gobeze were in control of the fortress, he would be able to halt the Oromos advance and assume responsibility for over 30,000 Christian refugees from Tewodros's camp. Yet, as Gobeze was unresponsive to these overtures, much preferring to acquire Tewodros's cannons, and the two Oromo queens could not reach an arrangement, Napier decided to destroy the fortress. After a thorough medical examination, which confirmed Tewodros's death as the result of suicide, the body was dressed and laid out in a hut. By the request of the Emperor's widow, the body was later buried in the Church of Magdala. Lieutenant Stumm, an eyewitness, described the discovery of Tewodros's body:

Climbing a narrow rock stairway, we advanced quickly toward a second gate, through which we passed without meeting resistance. About a hundred paces beyond it lay the half-naked body of the Emperor himself, who had taken his own life with a pistol shot. A strange smile was on the remarkably young and attractive-looking face, and I was struck particularly by the finely drawn, boldly aquiline nose.

— Matthies 2012

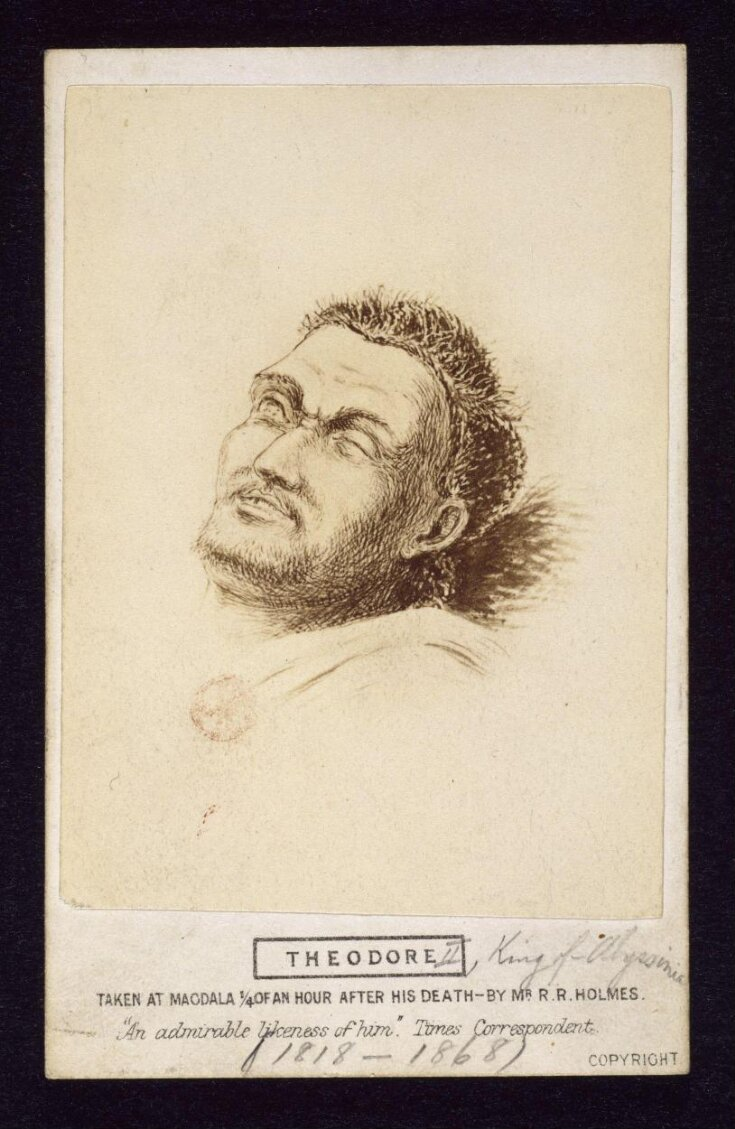
(Theodore, 1/4 of an hour after his death) "An admirable likeness of him" – Times Correspondent

After Tewodros had been buried, Napier allowed his troops to loot the citadel as a punitive measure; according to historian Richard Pankhurst, "fifteen elephants and almost 200 mules were required to carry away the booty". These became dispersed in museums and state collections across Europe, though some looted artifacts have been returned to Ethiopia. Tewodros II's family later moved the Emperor's remains to the Mahedere Selassie Monastery in his native Qwara, where they remain to this day. Tewodros had asked his wife, the Empress Tiruwork Wube, in the event of his death, to put his son, Prince Alemayehu, under the protection of the British. This decision was apparently made in fear that his life would be taken by any aspirant for the empire of Abyssinia. In accordance with these wishes, Alemayehu was taken to London, where he was presented to Queen Victoria, who took a liking to the young boy. Alemayehu later studied at Cheltenham College, the Rugby School and the Royal Military Academy Sandhurst. However, both the Queen and Napier were later concerned with the subsequent development of the young prince, who became increasingly lonely, unhappy and depressed during this time. In 1879, the prince died at the age of 19. He was buried near the royal chapel in Windsor with a funeral plaque placed to his memory by Queen Victoria.

On a curious side note, many of the hostages were unhappy with Napier's demand that they leave the country. Several hostages argued that they had long since become alienated from their old homeland in Europe and would no longer have any chance of building a new life for their families there. The German observer Josef Bechtinger, who accompanied the expedition, wrote:

Most of them, instead of thanking Providence for their final rescue – were not all happy with the new turn of events. They were indignant, upset, at having to leave Abyssinia. "What" they said, "are we supposed to do in Europe now, what are we supposed to do now with our wives and children back in our homeland – which has become alien to us? How are we supposed to live now among people who have [become] alien to us and whom we no longer like? What are we supposed to live on?

Bechtinger reported that many of them eventually returned to their adopted country from Suez by way of Massawa.

Following some short squabbles for the throne after his death, Tewodros II was eventually succeeded by Yohannes IV as the next Emperor of Ethiopia.

== Heirs ==
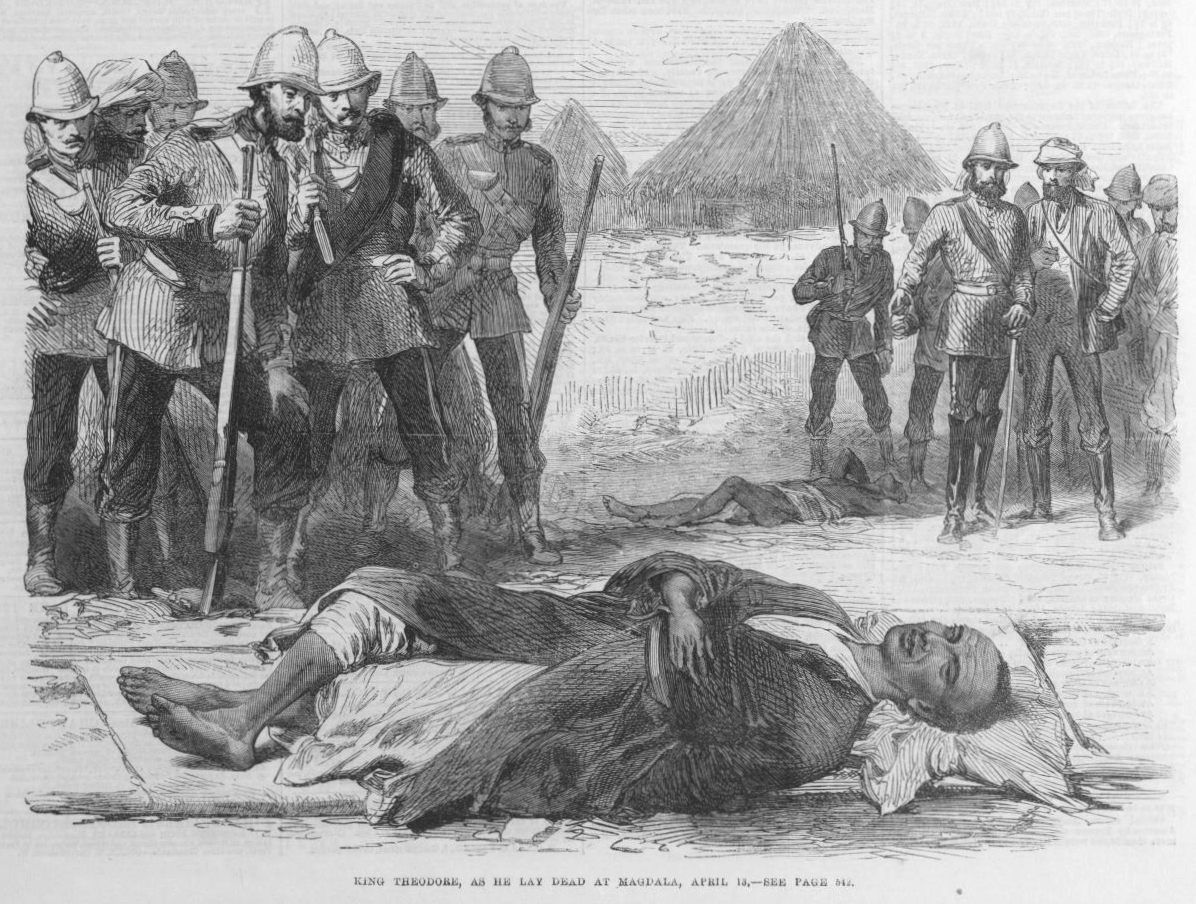
The End of King Tewodros II (The Illustrated London News, 1868)

The widowed Empress Tiruwork and the young heir of Tewodros, Alemayehu, were also to be taken to England. However, Empress Tiruwork died on the journey to the coast, and little Alemayehu made the journey alone. The Empress was buried at Sheleqot monastery in Tigray where her ancestors ruled. Although Queen Victoria subsidised the education at Rugby of Dejazmatch Alemayehu Tewodros, Captain Tristram Speedy was appointed as his guardian. He developed a very strong attachment to Captain Speedy and his wife. However, Prince Alemayehu grew increasingly lonely as the years went by, and his compromised health made things even harder. He died in October 1879 at the age of 19 without seeing his homeland again. Prince Alemayehu left an impression on Queen Victoria, who wrote of his death in her journal: "It is too sad! All alone in a strange country, without a single person or relative belonging to him... His was no happy life". Emperor Tewodros II had an elder son born outside of wedlock, named Meshesha Tewodros. Meshesha was frequently at odds with his father, especially after it was learned that he had assisted Menelik of Shewa in his escape from Magdala. When Menelik became Emperor of Ethiopia, Meshesha Tewodros was raised to the title of Ras and given Dembia as his fief. Ras Meshesha would remain a loyal friend of Emperor Menelik II's until his death, and his descendants were regarded as among the highest nobility and the leading representatives of Tewodros's line.

Tewodros II's much loved daughter, Woizero Alitash Tewodros, was the first wife of Menelik of Shewa, who eventually became Emperor Menelik II of Ethiopia. Woizero Alitash was abandoned by her husband when Menelik escaped from Magdala to return and reclaim his Shewan throne. She was subsequently remarried to Dejazmatch Bariaw Paulos of Adwa. When Menelik II was proclaimed Emperor of Ethiopia at Were Illu in Wollo shortly after the death of Yohannes IV, Woizero Alitash was among the first of the nobility to travel to Were Illu to pay homage to her former husband as the new Emperor. Rumors persist that Alitash and Emperor Menelik may have rekindled their relationship and that Alitash found that she was pregnant by the Emperor in the following months. The rumors continue that, upon hearing about this pregnancy of the Emperor's first wife, the childless and barren Empress Taytu Bitul had Alitash poisoned. Yet a different version of these rumors state that she gave birth to a boy and handed him over to a friend to be raised as a common farmer in Shewa. The eldest descendant of this line now resides in Kenya, married to the daughter of a Jegna, and some Ethiopians believe them to be the only legitimate heirs to the line of Tewedros II and Menelik II. Regardless of the veracity of these rumors, Woizero Alitash Tewodros, daughter of Tewodros II, died within the first few months of the reign of her ex-husband Menelik II.

== Honours ==
- Ascanian duchies: Grand Cross of Albert the Bear, 15 March 1863

== In popular culture ==
- Emperor Tewodros has come to occupy a high regard amongst many Ethiopians. Examples of his influence are seen in plays, literature, folklore, songs and art works (such as a 1974 book by Sahle Sellassie). Emperor Tewodros has come to symbolise Ethiopian unity and identity. Tsegaye Gebre-Medhin wrote his play 'Tewodros' in 1963. Chronicles of his life have been seen to be significant in the formation of Amharic and Ethiopian literature in English.
- Tewodros, under the name Theodore, appears in George MacDonald Fraser's fictionalised account of the 1868 conflict, Flashman on the March, where he is portrayed as a volatile, bloodthirsty madman.
- Karen Mercury's historical fiction The Four Quarters of the World (Medallion Press, 2006) depicts the rise and fall of Tewodros as seen through the eyes of his European captives, using primary sources from eyewitnesses to create an unbiased portrait of the Emperor.
- When the Emperor Dies by Mason McCann Smith is another work of historical fiction based around the rise, reign and fall of Emperor Tewodros.
- Philip Marsden's The Barefoot Emperor chronicles the life and times of Emperor Tewodros's quest for power and his reign. Marsden remarks that Tewodros's violence makes him ambiguous to be a true hero worthy of a bronze statue like Napier in London.
- Tewodros features prominently in Alan Moorehead's historical survey The Blue Nile.
- John Pridham composed and published a piano solo piece, "Abyssinian Expedition", commemorating the Battle of Magdala. The digitized (scanned) sheet music can be found at the National Library of Australia's website.
- Emperor Tewodros appears as the leader of the Ethiopians in Age of Empires III: Definitive Edition – The African Royals.
- Tewodros II has been posthumously named in landmarks, buildings, institutions or public space.
- Romanian writer Mircea Cărtărescu published a novel called Theodoros, where he narrates a fictional story about Theodoros's life.

== Bibliography ==
- d'Abbadie d'Arrast, Antoine (1868). L'Abyssinie et le roi Théodore, Ch. Douniol, Paris.
- Bates, Darrell (1979). The Abyssinian Difficulty: The Emperor Theodorus and the Magdala Campaign, 1867–68, Oxford University Press
- Bechtinger, Jos (1870). Ost-Afrika: Erinnerungen Und Miscellen Aus Dem Abessinischen Feldzuge. Vienna: C. Gerold's sohn.
- Bekele, Shiferaw (2007). L'Éthiopie contemporaine (sous la direction de Gérard Prunier), Karthala, 440 pages, (ISBN 978-2-84586-736-9); chap. III ("La restauration de l'État éthiopien dans la seconde moitié du XIXe siècle"), partie I ("L'ascension de Tewodros II et la restauration de la monarchie (1855–1868)"), pp. 92–97
- Henze, Paul B. (2000). "The Empire from Atrophy to Revival: The Era of the Princes and Tewodros II". IN: Layers of Time: A History of Ethiopia. New York: Palgrave. ISBN 0-312-22719-1
- Matthies, Volker (2012). The Siege of Magdala: The British Empire Against the Emperor of Ethiopia. Markus Wiener. ISBN 978-1-55876-552-8.
- Rubenson, Sven (1966). King of Kings: Tewodros of Ethiopia, Addis Ababa, Haile Selassie I University
- Zewde, Bahru; James Currey, A History of Modern Ethiopia, 1855–1991, London, 2002, pp. 64–111 (ISBN 0-8214-1440-2); partie II ("Unification and Independence – 1855–1896"), chap. I ("The first response: Kasa – Tewodros"), pp. 27–42.
- (Amharic letter) Lettre du Negussa Negest Téwodros II à un destinataire inconnu, sur le site des archives nationales d'Addis Abeba በኢንተርኔት

Tewodros II House of Solomon Born: circa 1818 Died: 15 April 1868
Preceded by Sahle Dengel	Emperor of Ethiopia; 1855–1868	Succeeded by Tekle Giyorgis II
