= History of Gondar =

History of Ethiopian city

This article is about the history of Gondar, a city in Amhara Region of Ethiopia, and previously served as the capital of the Ethiopian Empire from 1632 (at the beginning of Gondarine period to 1855 (end of Zemene Mesafint) era.

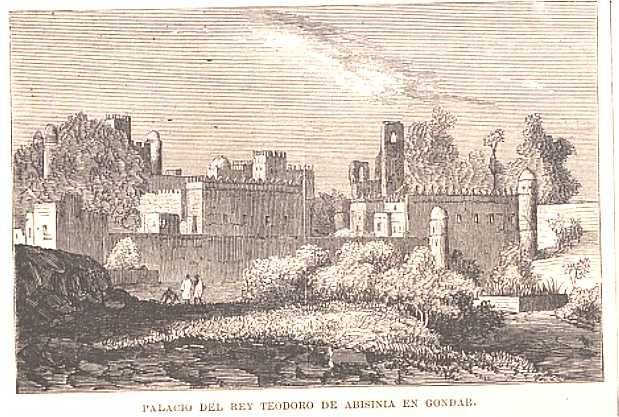
Engraving of the Royal Enclosure by Frank Leslie, 1867

== 17th century ==
Gondar was established in 1636 by Emperor Fasilides (r. 1632–1667) as the first permanent capital of the Ethiopian Empire, and chosen for strategical seat of the government and its fertile lands surrounded by Dambia and Wegera. More significantly, the relatively stable phenomena in the seventeenth century northern and central Ethiopia, caravans from Sudan and the Red Sea converged on and dispersed to Gondar. The city also sustained urban center and long distance trade until the half of the nineteenth century.

Historian Bahru Zewde highlighted the significance of Gondar by French travellers as "the Paris of Abyssinia". Unlike most early modern cities of Ethiopia, Gondar was relatively peaceful and healthier, but there were reported contagious diseases such as malaria. The peaceful state of Gondar led to localities where caravans from Sudan and the Red Sea converged. Fasilides translocation from Danqaz to Gondar also contributed to trading benefits, despite Lent and rainy season prohibited expeditions that made emperors to stay at the capital. Such incident quickly enabled him to prolong his reign and construct many buildings for the purpose of giving capital and additional reforms. He built 7 churches and the 5 emperors succeeded him aided to build several churches and palaces in what is called Fasil Ghebbi.

By the time of Fasilides' death in 1667 Gondar was so well established that his successor Yohannes I (1667-82) made no attempt to seek out a new capital for himself like the former monarchs. On the contrary, he spent much more time in Gondar then his father had done. Though, he left every year on expeditions before returning to his capital, but spent half the year inside the city. In 1669-70, the Emperor gave orders for the Muslims and Jews to move away from the Christians and form their own sectors in the city. At the same time he ordered that persons lending money should not charge interest. Yohannes seems to have encouraged the embellishment of the city. Like his father he erected a large number of edifices, most notably was a two story library and a chancery with an imposing tower. Yohannes died in July 1682, he "lived for ten days in a great new building" constructed that very year. According to the chronicles, this edifice, which was ornamented in ivory, was built by an architect named Walda Giyorgis who was described as "able, intelligent, and of good renown."

Yohannes's successor, Iyasu I (1682-1706), seems to have been very conscious to maintain the good will of the citizens of Gondar and it was reported that he never closed the doors of his palace, even at night, to give his subjects the impression that he trusted them. Iyasu's reign, like that of his father and grandfather, witnessed considerable building in the city. The Emperor was responsible for the erection of a new castle, and several other churches. The castle of Iyasu, which was reportedly erected by Walda Giyorgis, was described as "more beautiful then the house of Solomon." When Iyasu saw it he is said to have been "full of joy and happiness".

== 18th century ==
Gondar prospered until the reign of Tekle Giyorgis (r. 1779–1784), appropriately nicknamed Fäsame Mängest ("the End of Government"). This period was characterized by glorious personalities of Emperors such as Iyasu I, Bakaffa, Mentewab, and Dawit III. All castles and churches were highly centralized for royal nobilities. The French Charles Poncet, who has served as physician of Iyasu, offers wrote extensively about the town at the end of seventeenth century. His journey was important for it gave the outside world some information about the country during the period of its isolation, when the great city of Gondar was built. Poncet was the first European observer to describe the city, the existence of which was doubted in European circles where it was generally thought that Ethiopia still possessed no fixed capital. His third palace, Iyasu Palace also known as "Saddle on Horseback" resembles a saddle—to highlight the emperor's horsemanship. As a veteran of eleven battles and tax collector, Iyasu extended his boundary to Egypt, Yemen, and Sudan, and decorated his castle with ivory, mirrors, cedar, and a ceiling covered in gold leaf and precious stones.

After the death of Iyasu I death in 1706, Gondar became to decline because of most emperors preferred to enjoy luxurious life rather than spending in politics, giving the raise of Tigre Province such as the future capital Adwa in mid-eighteenth century. The event could lead of the ascension of major political figures in the period: Emperor Bakaffa and his widow Empress Mentewab and the first Tigre warlord Ras Mikael Sehul. However, the power was presided to Mentewab and the Amhara lords, where several members belonged to her family. They defended that the Empress should enthroned as Regent for her grandson as she had been for her son a decade and half earlier.

Mentewab brought her brother Ras Wolde Leul to Gondar and made him Ras Bitwaded. After the death of Iyasu II on 27 June 1755, Ras Mikael Sehul, who was on the way with guns, carpets, gold, silver and other tribute from Tigre, learnt the news two days later, when they arrived at Sembera Zagan in Wagara. Without any delay, he proceeded to the capital, arriving at morrow, he saw Iyasu II's son Iyoas I, who was child at the time of his reign.

On 7 September 1755, an agreement between the Empress and Mikael involving the marriage of his son Dejazmach Wolde Hawaryat to Mentewab's daughter Woizero Atlas can be seen as the path to supreme power to Gondar. Unbeknownst to him, Mentewab believed that Mikael could cooperate with her and merge their dynastic alliance without awareness of his power and wealth. Their ceremony was described to be conducted by "great pomp" befitting with daughter of king and queen and "great enjoy" reigned in the House of Tigre ruler. According to chronicle, the marriage took place in Gondar, some three months after the death of Iyasu II and ascension of Iyoas.

In 1767, Ras Mikael Sehul seized Gondar by considering himself the real leader of the Gondarine period. In May 1769, Mikael killed Iyoas and crowned 70 years old Yohannes II, ushering in the decentralized Zemene Mesafint (Era of Prince) since then. Upon his arrival in 1770, Wolda Hawariat claimed that Gondar had an epidemic of smallpox, where the chief comes to he capital with "ill of fever".

== 19th century ==
Accusing Ras Ali II of being alienated to Muslim, Wube of Tigre roused his people against Gondar, and seized the town in 1841. Despite being excommunicated by the church, Ras Ali insisted fighting and attempted to enlist an outlaw named Kassa (future Tewodros II) to his cause. Kassa as the future Emperor of Ethiopia, considerate himself as descendant of both Solomon and Alexander the Great by responding fighting Ali. Through this time, Gondar resembled to base of operations rather than a capital, yet there was small European community with one of these was the British Consul, Charles Duncan Cameron.

Starting from Battle of Ayshal in 1852, Kassa refused to order Ras Ali II, who controlled most princes and regions of northern Ethiopia, for his perennial military expedition against Gojjam. In response, Dejazmach Goshu Zewde of Gojjam, an ally of Ras Ali II, clashed with Kassa's army at the Battle of Gur Amba (27 November 1852). Ras Ali II left Gondar for Debre Tabor to call troops in rival provinces of Tigray, Wollo, Yejju. Afterward, he returned to Gondar where Kassa had occupied. In the Battle of Takusa (12 April 1853), Kassa pillaged Debre Tabor in 1852. On 29 June, Kassa proceeded destroying Ras Ali II's Oromo cavalry in one of costliest battles during the Zemene Mesafint, where Ali II died in 1856 after retreating to Yejju.

In 1854, Kassa Hailu took control of the town and called upon its nobles, citizens and clergy to accept his candidacy to the throne. The city assembly proclaimed him King of Kings and many cattle were slaughtered for the occasion and the Emperor gave alms generously to the poor. Tewodros, found it necessary to fight against local rulers and their followers in other areas, and was not attracted to Gondar which moreover seemed to him a symbol of Ethiopia's decadence. In 1864, Tewodros ordered the Muslim inhabitants of the city to convert to Christianity or leave, forcing many of them to flee the country. Relations between Tewodros and Gondar continued to deteriorate because of their suspected complicity in rebellion and the bitter disputes the Emperor had with the clergy. By the end of 1864, Tewodros declared Gondar to be a "town of priests who do not love me!" and ordered the city to be violently sacked and destroyed. His soldiers robbed the priests, burned down their residences, and plundered the monasteries in the former capital.

Emperor Yohannes IV spent the first part of his reign in Debre Tabor as Tewodros had done before him. The disappearance of the Emperor and his court led to a large demographic reduction in the city, Gondar's population, well over 60,000 in the 18th century, was said by some observers to have dwindled to only 8,000 in the 1870s. In the late 1880s, Gondar suffered serious blows as a result of fighting with the Mahdist Sudanese. The Ethiopian historian Blatengeta Heruy Wald Selassie, relates that the Mahdists entered the city in January 1888 "and burnt all the churches. Those who were brave were slaughtered on the spot, while the cowardly fled. The remainder, women and children were made prisoners and taken into slavery." In June of the following year the Mahdists again marched into Gondar and, "massacred the great and the humble, the men and women whom they found." As a result, Gondar towards the end of the century was thus little more than a ghost town abandoned in ruins.

== 20th century ==
In early 1900s, peace and stability resulted in some revival in Gondar's fortunes. Gondar was favorably situated between Sudan to the west, Addis Ababa to the south, and Eritrea to the north and hence enjoyed a sizeable amount of commerce. With thousands of traders traveling from Gallabat and Adwa, the merchants of Gondar and in Begemder were to find immediate sale for their merchandise. There were Italian representatives residing in Gondar; a merchant named Caremelli imported Italian cotton goods and distributed them in Gondar, and an Italian medical doctor gave free medical service to patients in Gondar. The Arab together Ethiopian Muslim merchants traded in rifles and revolvers.

The Italian enterprise in Italian Eritrea began Red Sea commerce instructed by Major Ciccodicola, the Italian Minister at Addis Ababa. Some two months, Major Ciccodicola communicated to Emperor Menelik II that Ferdinando Martini (1897–1907) to get permission for extending mule caravan road from Nuqara to Gondar. He also added that at the completion of the road, it would be owned by the Ethiopian government.

In 1930, revolts occurred in Gondar just before Emperor Haile Selassie inauguration were clear attempt to prevent his rule over the area. Haile Selassie then imposed central government in Gondar and Tigray which met resistance to topple the government. On 1 April 1936, the Italian troops occupied Gondar and within two years, 2,000 Europeans lived in the city. On 13–17 November 1941, the British and Italian military fought in Gondar during the East African Campaign of World War II, marking the withdrawal of Italian force from Italian East Africa.

In 1944, attempt to introduce land taxes following the Italian evacuation of the area met with military opposition in Gondar and Tigray. By 1950s, the population of Gondar has been fallen to 13,000, with few churches remaining. Still, Gondar was important religious center, becoming poor town with few modern amenities. Gondar traded cotton, saddles, shoes, ornaments, and cloth with other regions of the Blue Nile, but otherwise cut off the world. In 1970s, Gondar and Welega were hit by severe drought while the hardest year was in 1983–86.

The 1974 revolution affected azmaris and social and economic life of Gondar, creating Ethiopian diaspora in various parts of the world. During the Ethiopian Civil War, the Tigray People's Liberation Front (TPLF) reported that they actively engaging war against the Derg regime of Mengistu Haile Mariam in the northern province of Gondar.

In February 1989, the Soviet refused to ship more arms, and series of defeat of the Derg evacuated the government from Tigray Province. The TPLF then assembled the Amhara Democratic Party which formed the Ethiopian People's Revolutionary Democratic Front (EPRDF) and their force advanced to Gondar and Wollo Province. Shortly, They cut Addis Ababa–Gondar road and put Gojjam at risk. On 23 February 1991, the EPRDF launched military offensive codenamed "Operation Tewodros" against government in Gondar. In May 1991, Gondar was occupied by EPRDF forces concurrently with Wollo, Tigray and Gojjam.

== 21st century ==
The Royal Enclosure at Gondar completed its renovations in 2025.
