= Yejju =

Subgroup of Oromo ethnic group in Ethiopia

Yajju, Edjow
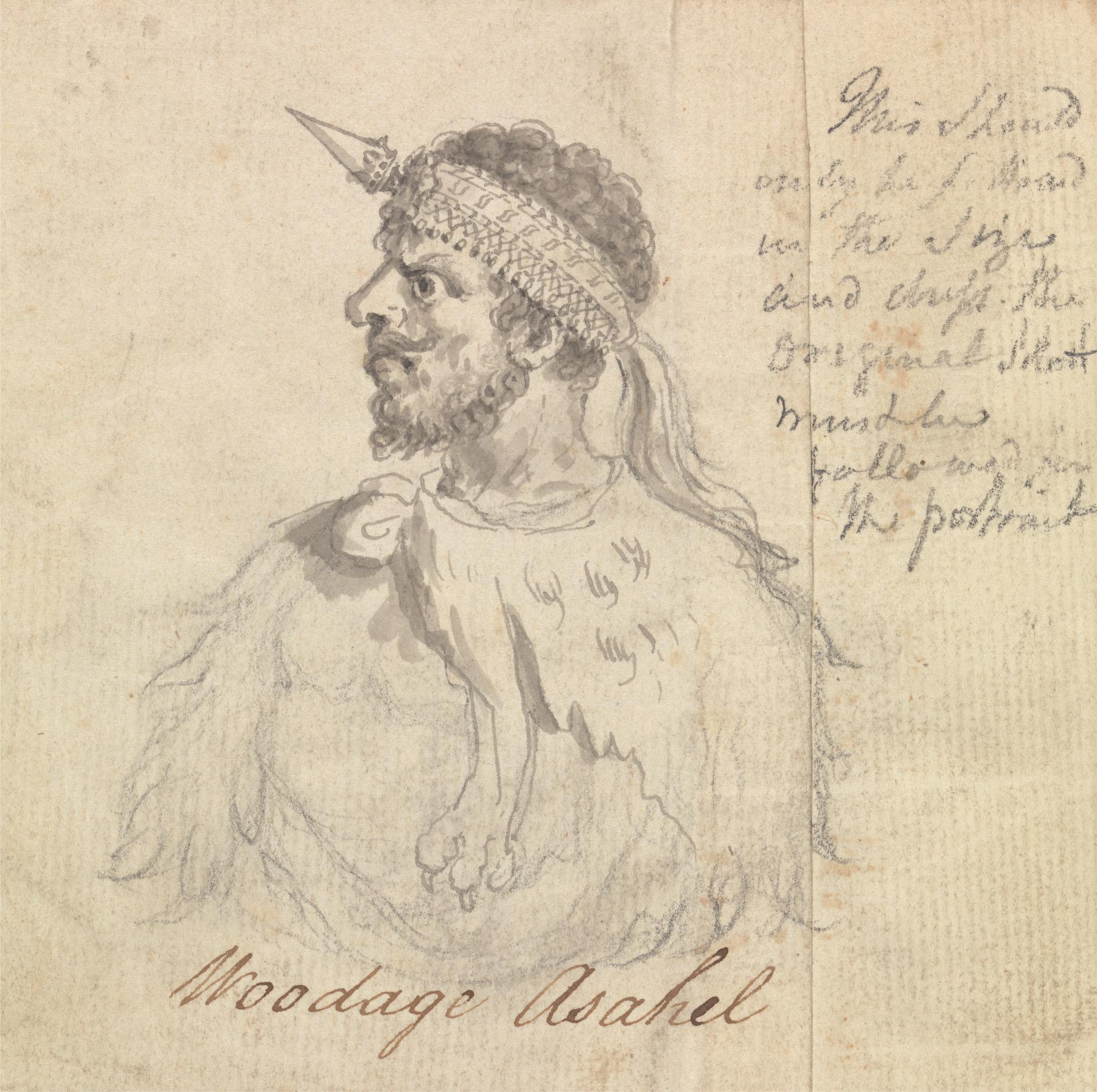
- Portrait of Woodage Asahel, a Yejju elite located in Gondar.

Regions with significant populations
- Wollo

Languages
- Amharic

Religion
- Islam and Christianity

The Yejju , also historically known as the Yajju, Edjow, Edjou, Leggiu are a sub-clan of the Barento branch of Oromo people. They are one of the northernmost communities of Oromo people residing in Ethiopia, along with the Raayyaa.

The Yejju were people that were first mentioned in the 16th century Futuh al-Habasha chronicle under the name "Al-Ejju". They inhabited a district called "Qawat” located in eastern Shewa. Eventually they settled in Angot instead of returning to their home district of Qawat. According to the historian Merid Wolde Aregay they were originally Christians but many were converted to Islam by Ahmad Gran and assisted him in his conquest of the province of Bete Amhara. He also states that there can be little doubt that the Al-Ejju that are mentioned in Futuḥ al-Habasha are the forefathers of the latter known Yejju people of the Zemene Mesafint period. The Oromo partially assimilated the Yejju and called them by the name of “Warra Sheik”. Due to their native origin, the Yejju mostly spoke Amharic and adapted themselves better than the rest of the Oromo clans in Wollo to the traditional social and political structures of Christian Ethiopia.

The Yejju dynasty were known as the "Warra Sheik", meaning "the descendant of Sheikh Omar". According to the Yejju tradition, Sheikh Omar was an Arab from the Arabia peninsula who during the Ethiopian-Adal war settled in Angot. The Yejju dynasty dominated Ethiopia during the Zemene Mesafint period.

According to professor Donald Crummey the Yejju were of non-Oromo origin, however they were influenced by the Oromo such as in cases of intermarriage. The ethnic makeup of the Yejju is complex. One theory is that the Yejju are the results of various layers of people: the Amhara population of Angot, remnants of the forces of Ahmad Gragn, and the migrating Oromo.

== History ==
=== Origins ===
As a result of their expansions, the Oromo settled in modern day Wollo and established dynasties, two of the most notable ones being the Mammedoch and the Warra Sheik. The Mammedoch dynasty had its origin from the Arsi under the leadership of their clan leader, Babo. The Warra Sheik dynasty had its origins in southern Ethiopia, who would also invade northwards, specifically Angot. However, there are other origin theories of the Yejju.

According to professor Muhammad Hassan, the El-Ejju, an Oromo clan, would be converted by Ahmad Gragn and would be defeated by Christian forces thereby under the command of their leader, Sheikh Umar, the El-Ejju would settle in Angot. This tradition states Yejju claim origin from the sixteenth century scholar Umar who had settled in the region during the Adalite occupation of Ethiopia. According to historian Richard Pankhurst, Yejju in addition to their native tongue also knew the speech of the Muslims of Adal which he states was Harari.

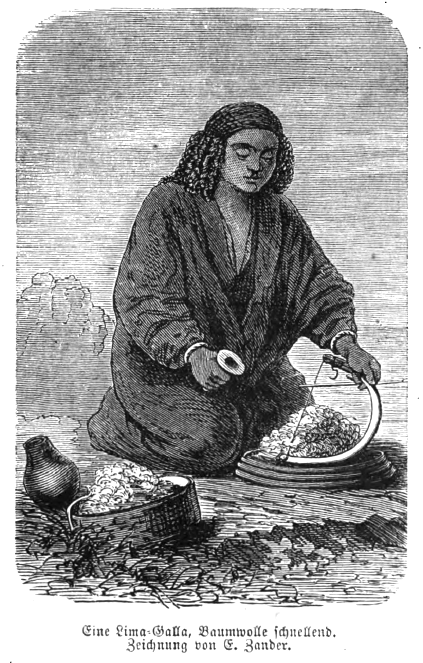
A Yejju Oromo woman from Wollo spinning wool, 1869

The Oromo firmly ensconced Wollo and dominated political and social life quickly in their new settlement. On the other side of Abyssinia, skirmishes broke out between Amhara and Tigrayan principalities for supremacy within the Abyssinian kingdom. Bakaffa I, a half-Amhara, half-Oromo prince, appealed to the Oromo neighbors to assist him in battle against the Tigrayans in the north. Many Oromos did not seem to care about jockeying for power but had been in a competition for land against the Tigrayans to the north of them so they complied 20,000 well-armed cavalry to assist the Amhara against the enemy.

Their support was decisive and Amhara nobles sent an invitation and a plea for the fighting force to stay in Gondar to defend the Negus and to act as a deterrent to future threats from Tigray. Many of the Oromo cavalry stayed in the Gondar region, especially after Bakaffa, who is now the Negesta Nagastat, married the widow of a high-ranking Oromo. The Oromos who resided in Gondar now would become close confidants to the Negesta Nagastat and significantly place substantial political influence within the kingdom.

By the time Iyasu II, the son of Bakaffa, came into power Oromo influence in the court was enormous and unsettled the Amhara nobles who questioned Oromo authority. Afaan Oromo is to have said dominated the Imperial court. A Scottish traveller, James Bruce, who visited Gonder during the period under discussion, wrote that "Nothing was heard at the palace but the Afaan Oromo language". In addition to this, marriage alliances between noble Yejju Oromos and elite Amharas were frequent. It was Mentewab, the wife of Bakaffa, who arranged marriage alliance between her son Iyasu II and a Muslim Oromo princess from Wollo, Wabi, the daughter of Amito, a powerful Wolloye chief. From this union, Iyoas I was born who later succeeded his father Iyasu II. This dynastic marriage alliance had remarkable importance for the Oromo lords of Wollo in gaining further access to the royal court and dominating the Empire since the 1780s. The son, born of this union, was sent to Wollo and eventually returned to rule in Gondar. This period of that eventually followed would be known as the "Era of Princes", or the Zemene Mesafint.

=== Zemene Mesafint era ===
==== Reign of Ras Ali I of Yejju ====
The death of Iyoas I would spark the Zemene Mesafint which would last until 1855. Ras Mikael Sehul of Tigray, the killer of Iyoas, became the sole leader of the kingdom. The motivation of the assassination may have had to do with the fear of Iyoas leaning towards his conservative Oromo side and his advisors being four corrupt Oromo uncles. Afraid of the politically influential Oromos who already stand in a political influential position, Sehul endeavored to win their support by granting them increased political sway and arranging royal marriages. Nonetheless, a group of Oromo princes conspired together to overthrow him. Sehul managed to flee back to his home province of Tigray. After disposing Sehul, the confederate Oromos put a "worthless" Amhara on the throne called Socinios, given the title "Kings of Kings". In the coming decades, the guardianship of the King of Kings passed into the hands of a Yejju Oromo family. The founder of this new dynasty of the Oromo regents was Ras Ali I of Yejju, who ruled the province of Begamder and Amhara from his centre in Debra Tabor.

==== Reign of Ras Aligaz of Yejju ====
When Sehul died in 1779, his son Wolde Gabriel succeeded him as the governor of Tigre and took up battle against the Oromo authority in Gondar but fell in battle to Ras Aligaz of Yejju, the brother of Ras Ali I. Ras Aligaz would succeed Ras Ali I after his death and after a period for struggle among Tigrayan nobility, Wolde Selassie would become the new governor of Tigray. In essence, the conflicts between the governors of Tigray and the Oromo lords revolved around the desire of the Tigrayans to overthrow the Oromo oligarchy and claim the title of Negesta Nagastat, while the yejju dynasty aimed to maintain the status quo by keeping the nəgusä nägäst as puppets for their own political and social advantage.

==== Reign of Ras Gugsa of Yejju ====
After the death of Ras Aligaz, his nephew Ras Gugsa of Yejju rose to power. After the death of Wolde Selassie, Tigray fell into a political crisis. The regent Oromos continued to expand into Gojjam, Semien, Showa, Lasta, and to a lesser degree, Tigray. Initially the Dejazmatch Zadwe of Gojjam and Damot tried to oppose the Oromo ascendancy and their spread into eastern Gojjam but was defeated by Ras Gugsa. Zadwe's territories were given to Ras Gugsa's son, Alula of Yejju.

Until the death of Ras Gugsa in 1825, northern Ethiopia was relatively quiet. The death of the Ras was, however, a signal for power among all important lords in the country. Local warlords formed coalitions to overcome the regent Oromo nobility of Begamder and Amhara. In the end, Wube Haile Maryam of Semien asked Ras Yimam of Yejju, another son of Ras Gugsa, for an alliance to defeat the coalition.

==== Reign of Ras Marye of Yejju ====
The political crisis in Tigray had come to an end in 1822 with Sabagadis Woldu becoming the victor. It had become evident that the new governor was planning to form a Tigrayan-Amhara coalition to oppose the regent Oromos in Gondar whom he accused of being Muslims. He was convinced that modern firearms could tip the scales against the fierce Oromo cavalry, thus understanding that European support was much needed. He dispatched a letter to King George IV in which he requested for military and technical aid. Sabagadis attempted to gain a foothold on the coast of the Red Sea for the British monarch to take so that he may breach the wall of isolation around Ethiopia and create a bridge to Christian Europe.

In 1830, Sabagadis succeeded in forming a loose coalition with the Christian rulers of Gojjam, Lasta, and Semien against Ras Marye of Yejju, the brother and predecessor of Ras Yimam. However, Ras Marye was forewarned of the plot and dealt with his opponents singly. After defeating Dejazmatch Goshu in Gojjam, he marched with the bulk of his army to Lasta then quickly turned to Semien and attacked Wube. Sebagadis, who was watching his border with Lasta, did not come to the aid of his ally and Wube preferred to submit to the Ras rather than face him alone.

After his success in isolating Sebagadis, Marye decided to put an end to the Tigrayan threat. At the head of the Oromo contingents from Wollo, Yejju, Begamder and Amhara, he advanced beyond Takkaze into Tigray. Sebagadis had meanwhile mobilized his forces and the two armies met at Mai Islami near Debra Abbai. Although the Tigrayans had a superior army, due to the equipment by the British, the match-locked men were poorly employed and the Oromo cavalry won the field after a most bloody fight in which the Ras was killed. Sebagadis had surrendered to Wube and was handed over to the Oromos to be executed in retaliation for the death of the Ras. It was said that right before his be-heading, Sebagadis said to the Oromos:

I have only fought this war to defend my country, which you wished, without cause, to ruin, and of which I was the father. You may kill my body; but my soul is in the hands of God...

A year after the execution of Sebagadis, people all over the Amhara countries were still lamenting Sebagadis, despite him being Tigrayan:

"Alas! Sebagadis, the friend of all,

Has fallen at Daga Shaha, by the hand of Aubeshat!

Alas! Sebagadis, the pillar of the poor,

Has fallen at Daga Shaha, weltering in his blood!

The people of this country, will they find it a good thing

To eat ears of corn which have grown in the blood

Who will remember St. Micheal of November to give alms?

Mariam (Marye), with five thousand Gallas, had killed him

For half of a loaf, for cup of wine,

The friend of the Christians has fallen at Daga Shaha."

After the death of Sebagadis, the Oromo army, under a furious Ras Dori of Yejju the brother of Ras Marye, went on to ravage Tigray in revenge of the death of Ras Marye. They pillaged and destroyed everything in sight, slayed all the men and women, and destroyed the province politically in disdain. As soon as they had reached Axum, Ras Dori was taken unwell and did not want the bad news to go around, so returned back to Amhara. Tigray, the only region that opposed the Oromo regents so far, were defeated and the young Wube of Semien would be given much of it for his contribution of the battle against Sebagadis. Ras Dori's disease creased upon him during the month of May when it was terminated in death.

==== Reign of Ras Ali II of Yejju ====
Throughout the 1830s and until the last years of the 1840s, the three most important rulers of Ethiopia were Wube a non-tigrayan ruler of Tigray, Semien, Wolkait, and Wogera, Negus Sahle Selassie of Showa, and Ras Ali II of Yejju, the grandson of Ras Gugsa through his son Alula of Yejju. The new Ras came into power in 1831 upon the deaths of his uncle Ras Dori.Dejamatch Goshu of Gojjam and Damot, the grand nephew of Ras Maru, often rebelled against Ras Ali II, who he believed stole his rightful title to Ras and sole ruler of Gondar.

Ras Ali II was still a minor when he became the ruler of Begamder and Amhara and the guardian of the King of Kings. He was put under the guardianship of a council of the most powerful Wollo and Yejju Oromo lords who elected him. With the help of his mother, Mennen, he was soon able to shake off the control of the regents and his legitimacy was firm. The Ras did not take his position seriously when it came down to religious affairs and practiced a system of laissez faire. Therefore, Ethiopia was left in the hands of an infantile and lethargic ruler.

By the half of 1838, it was an open secret that Wube was actively plotting to overthrow Ras Ali. He succeeded in forming an alliance with Goshu of Gojjam and Damot but was not ready to attack the Ras just yet as the situation in Tigray was still uncertain. In fact, when Wube rushed from Tigray across Takkaze to Semien in expectation of an attack from the Ras, Kassai, the son of Sebagadis, rebelled against him and succeeded in making himself the master of most of Tigray. The situation came to an end however when Wube's superior firearms was able to destroy the rebellion.

Planning to attack Ras Ali, Wube wanted more firearms to offset the superiority of the Oromo cavalry in the field and wanted to unite all Christians of Ethiopia behind him.

After this defeat by Ras Ali at the beginning of 1839, Goshu swore allegiance to the Ras and reinstated in his position. The Ras, however, took away west and north of Lake Tana and gave it to his mother, Mennen. Dissatisfied with his father's submissiveness, Birru Goshu fought his own father whom he defeated.

The current situation in Begamader had become so explosive that the Ras was forced to return to help his mother who was faced with a rebellion in Agawmeder, Dembya, and Wogera. The growing tension in Dembya and Wogera had grown due to rebellious shifta leaders, specifically Kassa Hailu who were defying her authority. A far more serious threat was the coalition formed by Wube, Goshu, and Faris Aligaz of Lasta, which succeeded in subverting the loyalty of many Amharas in Begamder and Amhara by accusing Ali of becoming a Muslim.

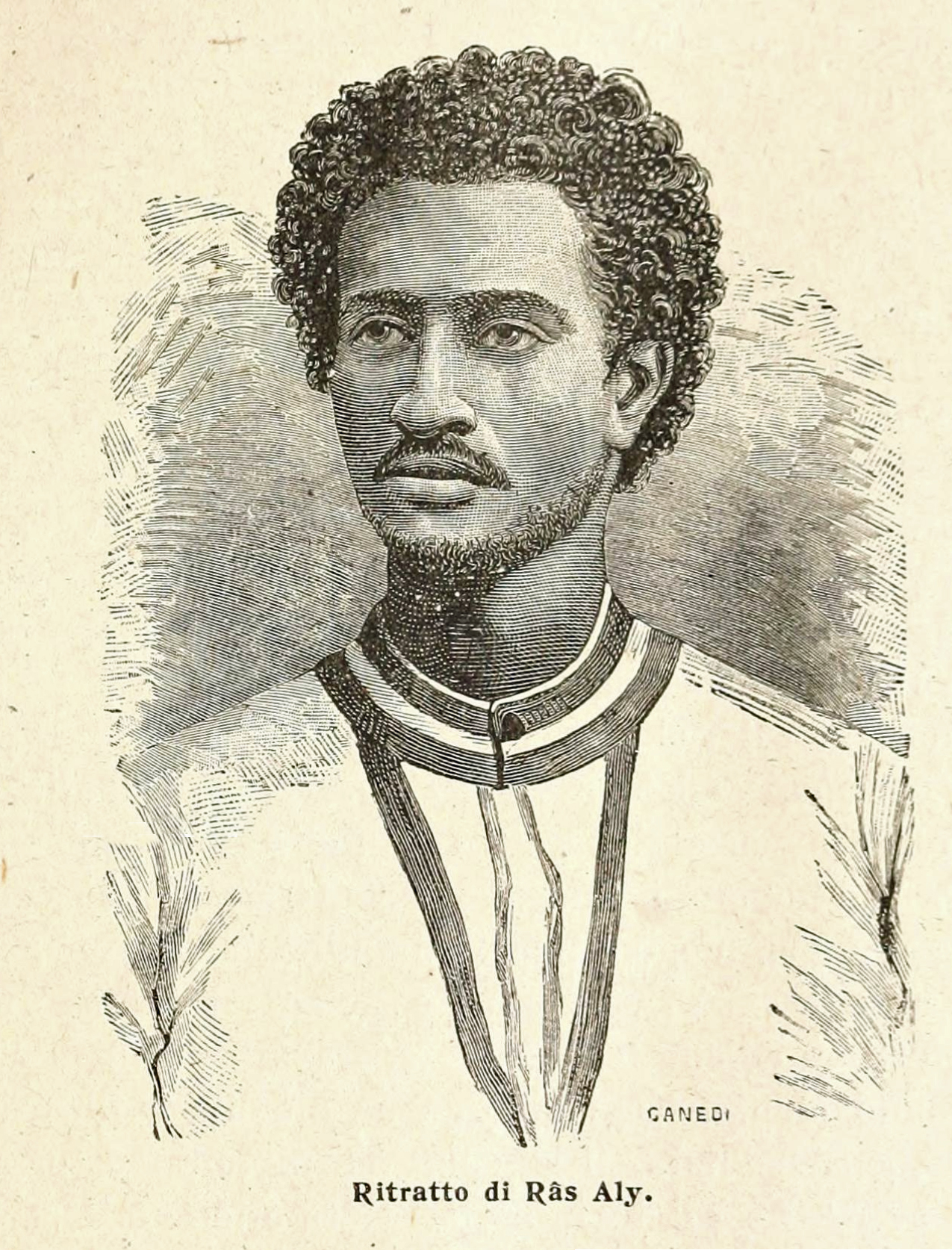
Ras Ali II of Yejju, the last de facto ruler of Abyssinia.

Wube's growing hatred for the Ras went through the roof when he openly announced that he intended to attack him, who he claimed was Muslim at the heart. He proclaimed that after he had defeated the Ras, he would install the lawful descendant of the line of Solomon, King of Kings Tekle Giorgis, who was at the time in his camp, on the imperial throne in Gondar. When Abuna Salama had arrived in Ethiopia in the last months of 1841, he was escorted to Wube's camp and was convinced by Wube of the Islamic tendencies of Ras Ali. He therefore excommunicated the Ras, and proclaimed the Ichege a heretic.

On the same year, Wube's army advanced into Begamder and soon, together with his ally Birru Goshu, captured Gondar. Wube and Birru then proceeded to attack Ali's army who met at Debra Tabor.

Both armies were similar in size, around 30,000. Ras Ali II's army was mostly composed of Oromo contingents and was supported by Dejazmatch Merso. Wube's army was overwhelming superior in firearms compared to the Ras, who had bad relations with Christian Europe.

The Battle of Debra Tabor was clearly a battle between the Christian Amhara and Tigrayan elements and the Oromo, fighting desperately to deserve their predominant position in northern Ethiopia. The battle was won by Wube and Birru but during their subsequent celebrations, the victors were surprised by a small Oromo army led by Aligaz. Wube and his son were taken prisoners but Birru managed to escape across the Abbay into Gojjam. Ras Ali II who escaped after his defeat with his followers returned to Debra Tabor and grudgingly rewarded the true victor, Aligaz, with the governorship of Daunt, a district to the south of Amhara bordering the Wollo country while Merso was given all of Wube's territories.

Despite the victory against the coalition, the Ras's position was war from secure. His enemies were still active in Gojjam, Damot, Dembya, and Lasta. Most of the clergy and the Christian population were against the Ras thanks to the propaganda spread by Wube and his allies. In such conditions, Ali found himself in dire need of the Abyna's support, leading him to be open to Abuna Salam's counsel to free Wube and restore his properties to him in exchange for minimal recompense and a pledge of loyalty. Nevertheless, the repercussions of the Debre Tabor conflict only added to Ali's predicament. However, the aftermath of the Debre Tabor battle further complicated Ali's position.

Dejazmatch Merso, who had reached Semien in the meantime, refused to give his brother's governorship, and the Ras was forced to march with his former enemy against his loyal ally. Moreover, the Muslim rulers who have always supported Ras Ali II, were greatly worried at the turn of events; they had objected to the grant of a governorship on their natural avenue of expansion to Aligaz, who was a Christian Oromo, and who was supported by his brother Faris Aligaz, an old enemy of some of the most important Muslim Wollo lords.

During this already uneasy period, there were rumors that Muhammad Ali, the governor of Egypt, was planning on invading Ethiopia. On leaving Ethiopia at the end of 1839, European diplomat and explorer Arnauld d'Abbadie met an Arab notable in the house of the governor of Massawa. The notable was on a mission to Ras Ali and Dejazmatch Wube from the Pasha of Mecca; but it is not known whether this mission was political, religious, or economic. In October 1841, the missionary Krapf who was in Shewa wrote the following:

If Muhammad Ali will capture Abyssinia he would be able to recruit forces for the army, especially by taking and organizing... the Galla people, who will furnish him with men and horses.

However, when the Belgian Consul in Egypt arrived in Gondar to negotiate with the Ras, a messenger of Muhammad came to him carrying the following message signed with the seal of the Pasha:

Do not fear, your friends will be my friends and your enemies will be my enemies.

His words did not match his actions as later Muhammad Ali would dispatch the Egyptian army to Wehni to take advantage of the Ethiopians who were in a difficult situation with internal matters. As soon as Ras Ali's troubles were over, the Egyptians immediately withdrew most of their army but were caught in an ambush north of Wolkait. Muhammad Ali would later tell the French Consul-General in Egypt that the hostilities between the Ethiopians and Egyptians were never serious. The talk about conquering Gondar completely subsided by the end of 1842 as the Egyptians were so absorbed with their expansion along the Nile.

After Wube's defeat at Debra Tabor, the situation in Tigray was very much similar to that which had existed after the death of Wolde Selassie. Political crisis ensued and many pretenders fought for dominance in the different provinces. Throughout 1842 and the first half of 1843, Wube slowly established authority on both sides of Takkaze. Ras Ali II who at the beginning allied him was soon afterwards forced to march back to his own domains to suppress the many rebellions in his realm. Nevertheless, Wube succeeded in defeating his brother, Merso, who would later escape to Gondar. Although Wube at this point had given up his imperial aspirations of restoring the Solomonic dynasty, he had continued adopted the policy of fostering relations with the European Powers from former governor of Tigray, Sebagadis.

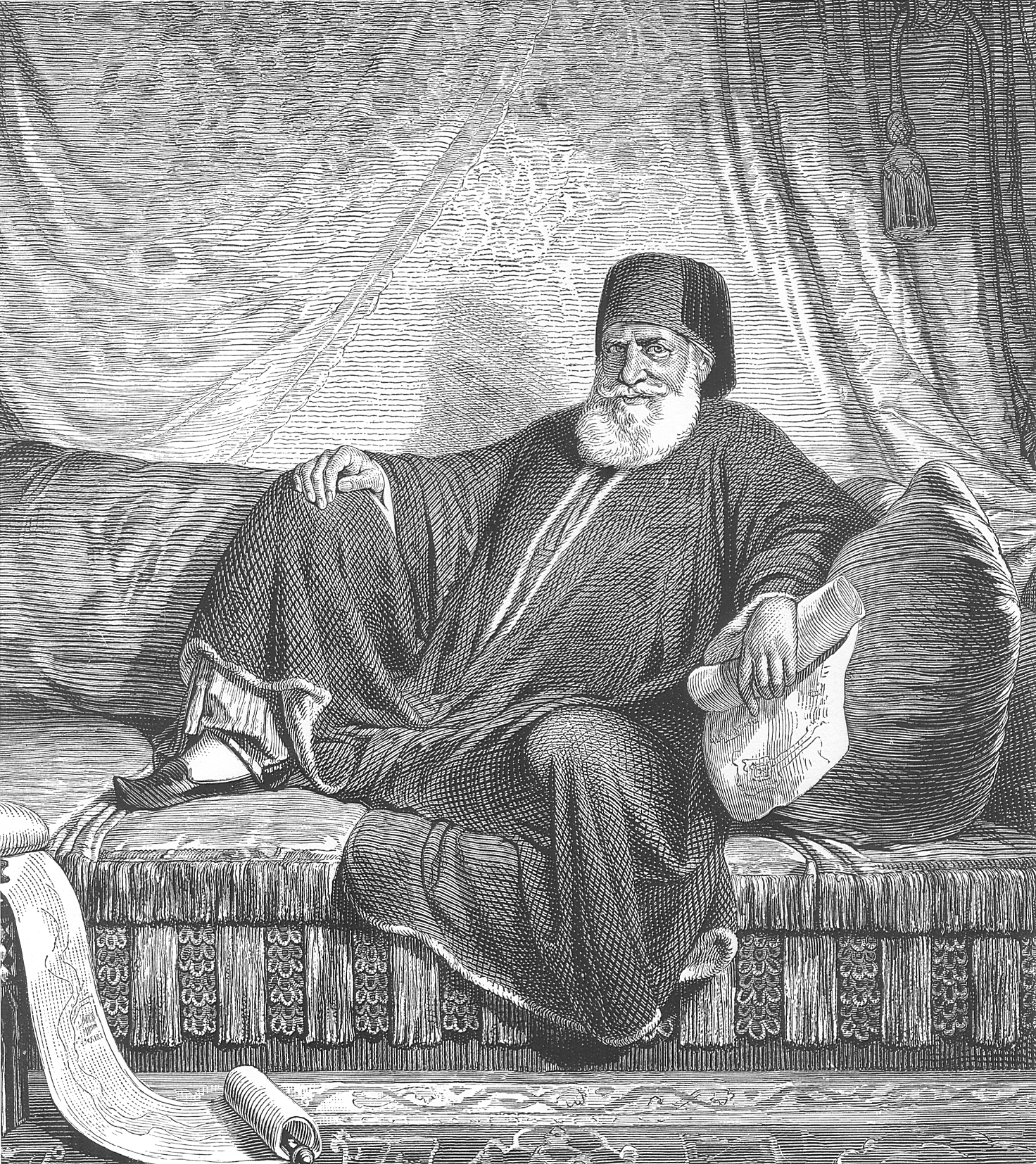
Muhammad Ali Pasha of Egypt

Throughout 1845 and the beginning of 1846, Ras Ali's army was continually engaged in the suppression of rebellions in the Amhara provinces and in a fruitless chase of Goshu, who had defied Ras Ali's rule. Goshu would continue to be a problem for the Ras until his fall with Kassa Hailu in 1853. Another major problem for the Ras was Abuna Salama who he had to keep under control as an asset.

Empress Mennen, Ras Ali's mother, was ruler of the provinces to the west and north of Lake Tana. These areas were infested with bands of Shifta, who often raided the trade routes between Ethiopia and Sudan. One of the Shifta leaders, Kassa Hailu who was a relative to Dejazmatch Kinfu, had gained the support of the local populace and rose to much fame that the Ras and Mennen wanted him on their side. He therefore was promised that if he would declare his loyalty to the Ras and join his followers, he would be given Ras Ali's daughter and the governorship of his birthplace, the district of Qwara. Kassa accepted the offer but was later embarrassed to find out that the position that he was to be given in Qwara was subordinate to that of one of Mennen's weaker Muslim generals.

At the end of 1845, Mennen demanded Kassa to guide the military commander of Qwara and his army into the low-lands. However, the humility which Kassa had shown in the presence of Mennen had just been a pretence, and once in border areas, Kassa started to incite the population against Mennen. Kassa revolted and attacked isolated posts of Mennen's troops. Consequently, Mennen marched with her army to Chelega but Kassa retreated. Mennen was furious and wanted revenge but in the meantime relations between Ras Ali and Wube had deteriorated that another major contest between the two was expected momentarily and Mennen was forced to leave Chelega in order to support her son in the approaching crisis. While Mennen marched to join the Ras, Kassa took advantage of the opportunity by ravaging Ddembya. He entered Gondar in January 1847 and appointed his own officials in the town.

During April 1846, Ras Ali, who was preparing for his annual expedition against Aligaz Goshu, called upon his tributary Dejazmatch Wube to send him funds and soldiers his coming campaign. Wube, who was himself pestered with rebellions in Tigray used all kinds of excuses and pretexts in order not to comply to the commands of his master. The Ras, who had distrusted Wube since the battle of Debra Tabor crossed into Wogera. Wube quickly mobilized his armies and rished from Tigre to Semien. As soon as Wube was again at war with Ras Ali, the situation in Tigray reverted to what it had been in 1842. Rebellions broke out different provinces, Balgada Araya, an enemy of Wube, declared himself ruler of Tigray, and Muhammad Ali had assumed full authority on the coast of the Red Sea.

Both Ras Ali and Wube's troops were avoiding battle. It had become evident due to the fact that the Ras was just ravaging the plains of Wogera while Wube remained in the mountain defiles which were heavily guarded by matchlockmen. Both leaders were eager to find a way out of the deadlock. Both of their countries were deteriorating: In Tigray, the Egyptians had reached Massawa and in the realm of the Yejju, Gosdu was back again causing trouble in Gojjam and while Kassa was causing trouble in Gondar.

Once the news of Massawa had reached Wube, he had surrendered to the Ras and was paid tribute. After the crisis was over, Mennen rushed quickly into Gondar and soon afterwards followed a retreating army of Kassa in the direction of the northern shores of Lake Tana. Once the two armies met, Mennen was completely defeated and was taken prisoner together with her husband, former Emperor Yohannes.

Ras Ali, who was on his way to Lasta, quickly marched to Gondar to revenge Kassa. Once he had reached Kassa, he resorted to common sense and the Ras agreed to give him all the territories of Dejazmatch Kinfu as well as the title Dejazmatch in exchange for his mother, Mennen.

At the end of April in 1847, Ras Ali led his armies against Birru Aligaz. Taking advantage of this situation, Dejazmatch Goshi and his son Birru Goshu invaded Begamder and finally reached Gondar at the end of the year. They sacked the city due to the harsh treatment that was brought upon Abuna Salama. Meanwhile, Kassa began to advance towards Sennar to reconquer the areas which were once under his governorship by the Egyptians. Kassa was no match against the Egyptians and his army was obliterated by Egyptian muskets and cannons.

When Kassa had recovered from his wounds, he was in a very difficult situation, as even the remnants of his army were in a rebellious mood. He was faced even in a more serious crisis when the Ras, who had just finished vassalizing Aligaz, ordered him to appear in Debra Tabor. Kassa realized that compliance with his master's order could mean imprisonment in retaliation for the inflicted damage he had done to Mennen in the past. For some time, he delayed his answer and brought up excuses lik how the rainy season had commenced. He took advantage of this situation to rebuild up his army up to 7,000 soldiers and marched to an area not too far from Gondar.

With the end of the rainy season, Ras Ali had demanded for Kassa to appear in Debra Tabor and if not, then he would attack him. This time, Kassa flatly refused the demand. As a result, the Ras marched on Dembya in January 1849, ravaged the town, and defeated Kassa's army. Kassa surrendered and appeared to the Ras to ask for forgiveness. He was forgiven and confirmed his governorship and later joined the Ras in his campaign against Goshu and Birru Goshu. Kassa would serve the Ras faithfully whenever called upon to do so until 1852.

When faced with Ras Ali's army once again, Dejamatch Goshu surrendered immediately and was confirmed governorship while his turbulent son, who hated the Ras, preferred to escape to his mountain fortress where he was besieged until the fall of the Ras in 1853.

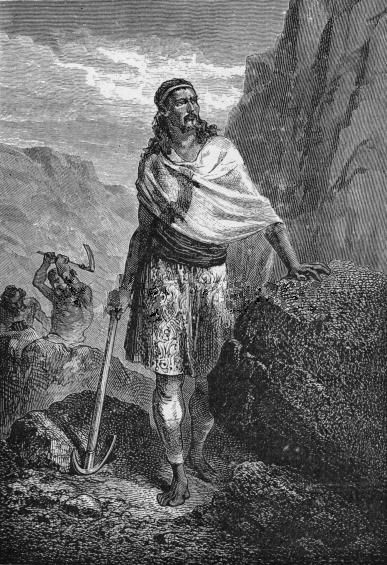
Kassa Hailu, later crowned Tewodros II, the man who ended the Zemene Mesafint.

==== The fall of Ras Ali II of Yejju and end of the Zemene Mesafint ====
Between the years 1849 and 1852 most of northern Ethiopia enjoyed a period of relative stability and internal peace, the like of which it had not known since the times of Ras Gugsa, but this was just a lull before the big storm which was to bring the Zemene Mesafint to an end and change the history of the country. Kassa, who was tired of being used as a tool for his master whom he secretly despised rejected a call to arms under Ras Ali's command. The Ras was quick to respond as he had brought most of his rebels under submission and dispatched a strong army to Agawmeder to chase the outlaw. Kassa managed to avoid battle and spent the rainy season among his kinsmen of Qwara. As in the past, he used the rainy season to reorganize his army and strengthen it. This time, Kassa was able to recruit into his service a number of deserters from the Egyptian army who would help him in his later major battle with the Ras.

At the end of the rainy season of 1852, the Ras after renewing his campaign against Birru Goshu, ordered his own troops back to Begamder and commanded Dejazmatch Goshu to march against Kassa. The Ras wished to pit the two chiefs against each other whom he did not really care much for as long as one would be destroyed in battle. Ras Ali's plan was a success and Goshu was killed by Kassa on the plains of Gur Amba.

This victory was one of the first successful battles which made Kassa the master of Ethiopia but Kassa did not feel strong enough to challenge the Ras yet and in an effort blamed Mennen for all their misunderstandings. The Ras, however, was far from forgiving and collected a sizeable force with Birru Aligaz, the victor of Debra Tabor, being the commander of the army. In April, the two armies met at Taqusa with Kassa being the victor. Dejazmatch Birru Aligaz and Dejazmatch Balaw were killed in battle. The battle shocked the entire country and Kassa was finally able to come from behind his mask of submissiveness and openly declare his aim to defeat Ali and reunite Ethiopia under his rule.

A short time after the battle of Taqusa, Kassa marched his army southwards to Debra Tabor, but in the meantime the Ras had moved down to the plains of Ayshal, which were particularly suitable for the employment of his unbeatable Oromo cavalry.

After the burning of Debra Tabor, Kassa followed Ras Ali to Qwarta and on the 29th of June, the two armies clashed at Ayshal in one of the bloodiest battles of the Zemene Mesafint. The charges of the Ras' cavalry were only smashed because of Kassa's personal bravery and the devotion of his followers. When it became apparent that Kassa was about to win the day, the Ras was among the first to flee the battlefield and took asylum in the sanctuary of Mahdera Maryam. However, when Kassa was approaching him, he fled to his kinsmen, the Yejju Oromo, closely pursued by units of Kassa's army. He was, however, never apprehended. The battle of Ayshal dealt the death blow to the Oromo aspirations and brought an end of the Yejju dynasty of Ethiopia, as well as the end of the long era Zemene Mesafint.

== Aftermath ==
Tewodros' campaign eventually foundered and by the time Napier's celebrated expedition made its way to Abyssinia to save British hostages held by Tewodros, the Emperor was surrounded by hostile Oromos who have every assistance to the British.

In his push to expand the area of Abyssinian rule beyond its historical limits, Menelik II first conquered the Wollo Oromo and created a single administrative region that he called Wollo. In this province, Oromos were sandwiched between Amhara on one side and Afar on the other. This administrative unit still exists with the name Wollo.

A number of observers have commented on the importance of the Wollo Oromo to instability of Amhara rule. Margery Perham writes of the Wollo Oromo:

[Oromos] who on the eastern escarpment of the northern plateau... have been in ling and close contact with the Amharas [but who] have resisted absorption and have therefore been the source of grave weakness to the Amharas" (1969:303).

G. A. Lipsky also notes in a survey of the peoples of the empire:

The Galla [Oromo] to the north of Shoa [in Wollo] particularly Wollo, Yejju and Raya Gallas [called Azebu by the Tigrayans], have never been thoroughly assimilated and remain a political liability. Accounts of Haile Selassie's journey from Addis Ababa in 1936 indicate that the Wollo Oromo spat at him and he passed through their areas he refused to travel there again (Shepherd 1975:9).

With the adoption of ethnic federalism in 1994 and the abolishment of the Awrajja administrative structure, Yejju was divided between the districts of Habru, Weldiya town, and the mid-altitude portion of Guba Lafto. Due to the assimilation of Yejju Oromos into the dominant Habesha culture during the 20th century, the descendants of the Yejju, presently found in the Amhara Region, identify as Amharas.
