= Ethiopian–Ottoman border conflict =

Military campaign, 1832–1848

- Part of the campaigns of Muhammad Ali of Egypt
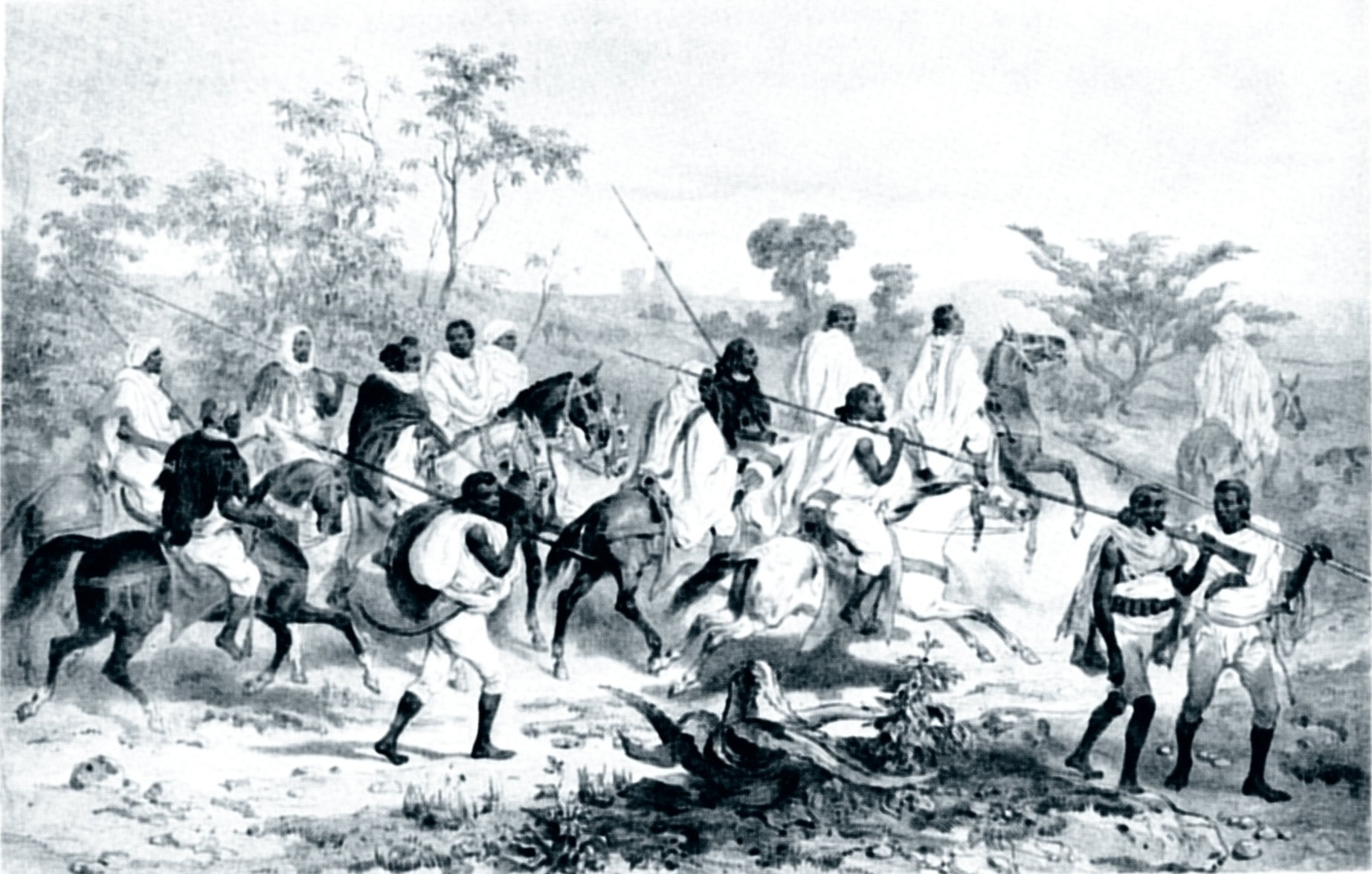
- Ethiopian warriors in Begemder (c. 1845)
Date	1832–1848
Location	Ethiopia and Sudan
Result	Egyptian military victory Ethiopian political victory: Status quo ante bellum; Ethiopia retains territorial integrity and independence; Egypt occupies Metemma, Kassala and Teseney; Ethiopia fails to reoccupy Eastern Sudan; Egyptians expand south into the Great Lakes region

Belligerents
Ottoman Empire: Eyalet of Egypt	Ethiopian Empire

Commanders and leaders
Muhammad Ali	Wube Haile Maryam; Kenfu Hailu; Kassa Hailu

Strength
6,000 men (1837)	20,000 men (1837)

Casualties and losses
Unknown	Unknown

The Ethiopian–Ottoman border conflict was an undeclared war between the Ottoman province of Egypt and various Ethiopian warlords occurring soon after the Egyptian conquest of Sudan. By the middle of the 19th century, the Ethiopians and Turco-Egyptians faced each other across an undefined and contested border. Muhammad Ali initially entertained the idea of conquering all of Tigray and Amhara, but by the middle of the 19th century Egypt had only limited objectives in Ethiopia, namely to establish its authority over the mineral rich slopes of the Ethiopian peripheral areas.

== Background ==
The situation in Ethiopia during the first half of the 19th century was generally conducive to Egyptian conquest. The country was going through a period known as the Zemene Mesafint which were a series of internal wars between powerful regional noblemen that resulted in the complete fragmentation of the Ethiopian Empire. Moreover, the de facto ruler of the country was a powerful Muslim warlord known as Ali II of Yejju, as he feared the growing pressure of the Tigrayan and Amhara lords, was ready to invite the Egyptians to enter Ethiopia, if necessary.

One of the most important motives for the Egyptian conquest of Sudan was the wish to seize the legendary gold reserves of Bilad as-Sudan. A final possible goal was a conquest of Ethiopia as part of a much more ambitious plan by Muhammad Ali to dominate the whole area between the Nile and the Red Sea. During the conquest, the British Consul to Egypt, Henry Salt, warned Muhammad Ali against such a plan. As a result of this warning Muhammad Ali instructed his commanders to limit their conquests to the kingdoms of Dongola, Shendi and Sennar. However, the gold mines on the frontiers of Ethiopia were too tempting for the Egyptians. At the end of 1821, Muhammad Ali's son, Isma'il Kamil Pasha, penetrated into the area of Benishangul but after hearing of tensions in Sennar, left the area in 1822 and was later murdered by members of the Ja'alin tribe.

The Egyptian conquest of Sudan in the 1820s caused worry over Ethiopia's northern regions. The governor of Tigray, Sabagadis Woldu, sought British support, however the British were not interested in a permanent foothold in Ethiopia. Sabagadis was then defeated and killed by the lord of Semien, Wube Haile Maryam, who conquered Tigray and then imported firearms from European arms dealers. With the establishment of the arms trade in northern Ethiopia he would become the most powerful lord in Ethiopia. With the end of Greek rebellions by the end of 1829 the Egyptian administrations was ready to expand towards the Ethiopian frontier.

== Campaigns ==
The first clash between Egyptian and Ethiopian forces occurred in 1832 when an Egyptian governor sent some troops to occupy Gallabat. The occupation of Gallabat greatly angered the lords of Dembiya, who sent an army from Gondar to kill the Egyptians, however the Egyptians were able to evacuate the town before the arrival of the Ethiopians. By 1833 the Egyptians had a force of 5,000 regular infantry and a few thousand irregular cavalry in Sudan, Khurshid Pasha was able to methodically extend Egypt's control over the frontier with this small army. In light of the First Syrian War, Egypt's resources were exhausted and many European consuls felt that Muhammad Ali was preparing for a conquest of Abyssinia. He drew the attention of the British consul when he appointed his son, Ibrahim Pasha as pashaluk of al-Habash thus making it clear that he did aspire to conquer Ethiopia.

The policy of raiding and extending Egyptian authority over the Ethiopian plateau was pursued by Khurshid Pasha from 1832 to 1837. The areas east of Kassala as far as Teseney were continuously raided by the Egyptians for slaves and cattle, however no permanent Egyptian post was established. The coastal areas between Massawa and Suakin were forced to recognize Egyptian hegemony. Shiekh Miri of Gallabat was forced to submit to the Egyptians and by 1834 Metemma was considered to be within Egyptian territory.

=== Wolkait campaign ===
East of Qadarif lay Welkait, which served as a base for the exiled leader Mek Nimir who continuously raided the Egyptians in Sudan. The Egyptians then opened up negotiations with Wube Haile Maryam, the protector of Nimir, for the surrender of the latter. Nimir was later captured in a failed raid at the end of 1834. Failing to get Nimir on their own terms the Egyptians then step up their raids into Wube's territory.

In early 1836 a large force under Ahmad Kashef consisting of a battalion of regular troops, a thousand irregular cavalry and a number of Albanians invaded Welkait. They sacked the area, burned churches and took many prisoners. On their way back however, they were ambushed by the followers of Wube Haile Maryam, according to an eyewitness some hundreds of Egyptians were killed or taken prisoner and many firearms were left by the "Turks" on the battlefield. Nevertheless, Ahmad Kashef managed to escape back to Khartoum along with 1,200 captives.

=== Gondar campaign ===
In May 1837 the Egyptians led by Ahmad Kashef entered Metemma accompanied by Sheikh Mirri of Gallabat. They advanced into the direction towards Gondar where they destroyed two villages and sent the captives back to Khartoum. The city of Gondar was thrown into a panic as they feared the Egyptians would eventually sack the city as well. Kenfu Hailu, the governor of Dembiya, quickly gathered an army of 20,000 and moved to attack the Egyptians who retreated in an area known as Kalnabu, a flat area unsuitable for defense. Ahmad and his 1,500 men made a series of disorganized attacks on the enemy, after an hour of skirmishing his cavalry was captured and Ahmad fled the battlefield with a few horsemen, the rest of his army was killed or captured by the Ethiopians. After plundering Gallabat and punishing its population, Kenfu then returned to Gondar. Later Kenfu Hailu stated that he did not think much of the Egyptian troops bolstering to Khurshid Pasha, declaring that if the Egyptians again entered Ethiopian territory he would descend upon them with 60,000 troops. Khurshid then assembled and army of 7,500 men and prepared to invade Abyssinia. He was only prevented from doing so after an intervention from the United Kingdom who warned the Muhammad Ali government not to invade Christian Ethiopia, forcing the Egyptians to back down.

In the late 1830s and early 1840s, Egyptian Sudan would become the target of Ethiopian shifta (bandits) who plundered Egyptian caravans and disrupted trade in the region. Muhammad Ali ordered Ahmad Pasha to send an expedition to Gondar to aid a pro Egyptian warlord known as Ras Ali II against an Amhara warlord known as Wube Haile Maryam and to secure the trade routes, however after the Battle of Debre Tabor the Egyptians withdrew from the Gondar area. Muhammad Ali then told the French consul that he was planning to sign a peace deal with the "northern provinces of Abyssinia" and the hostilities between Ethiopia and Egypt were never that serious. For the next several years the Ethiopian-Egyptian border remained relatively quiet, apart from raids by Ethiopian shifta which the future emperor Kassa Hailu would take part in.

=== Battle of Dabarki ===
In the late 1840s, future Abyssinian Emperor Tewodros II embarked on a campaign to consolidate his empire by invading Gonder, which he occupied in 1847. With his victory in the south secured, Tewodros decided to strengthen his position by damaging his major rivals, namely Egypt. Invading through Ethiopia's western frontier, the Ethiopian army captured Metemma and advanced into the Egyptian-controlled Sudan.

In March 1848, Kassa and his force of 16,000 warriors attacked Dabarki, a fortified post garrisoned with a battalion of 800 Egyptian troops and two cannons. Kassa led his men in a frontal charge against the Egyptian fort and the Ethiopians suffered heavy losses by the accurate musket fire and the cannons, Kassa himself was slightly wounded during the assault. After this he led the remnants of his army back to Begemder.

For Kassa, the defeat represented a major setback to his campaign for unification and strained his alliance with Ras Ali II of Yejju, who was deeply enraged by the disastrous expedition. By mid-1849, Kassa began focusing on acquiring modern weapons to address the weaknesses revealed at Dabarki.

== Aftermath ==
The defeat nearly lead to an invasion of Ethiopia, which would not occur until the Ethiopian–Egyptian War decades later, when Egypt's disastrous invasion put an end to all ambitions of conquering Abyssinia and its costs added to the nation's massive financial debts and the decline of the later khedivate.
