= Battle of Konzoula =

Battle of Qwénzéla
Date	4 October 1839
Location	Qwénzéla, Ethiopia
Result	Victory for Goshu Zewde's army: Lij Yilma and Lij Makonnen are taken prisoner

Belligerents
Army of Gojjam	Loyalists to the sons of Kenfu Hailu

Commanders and leaders
Goshu Zewde; Birru Goshu	Lij Yilma; Lij Mekonnen

Strength
~30,000	~30,000

Casualties and losses
200	1,000

The Battle of Konzula (Qwénzéla) was a military confrontation that took place during the "Zemene Mesafint" era, involving Dejazmach Goshu, Prince of Gojjam, and his son Birru on one side, and the sons of Dejazmach Kenfu on the other.

Dejazmach Kenfu, who had governed the province of Dembiya as a subordinate to Ras Ali, died, prompting Ras Ali to reinstate the province under the administration of Birru Goshu, the son of Goshu Zewde. This decision incited rebellion from Kenfu's sons, Lij Yilma and Lij Mekonnen, who mobilized their forces and engaged Birru's troops on October 4, 1839.

The battle was relatively brief and minimally lethal. The forces of Goshu Zewde quickly asserted dominance. Birru Goshu commanded the right flank, demonstrating exceptional fortitude by maintaining the cohesion of his infantry despite being encircled by enemy forces. On the left flank, however, the cavalry under the leadership of Kenfu's sons succeeded in breaking through with sustained charges. Despite this setback, the central formation of Kenfu's army was decisively defeated by Goshu's forces, resulting in the disintegration and retreat of the opposing army.
