= Battle of Amba Jebelli =

1854 battle in Ethiopia

- Part of Zemene Mesafint
Date	March 1854
Location	Amba Jebelli, Gojjam
Result	Victory for Kassa Hailu

Commanders and leaders
Dejazmach Kassa Hailu	Birru Goshu

The Battle of Amba Jebelli was fought in Ethiopia in 1854 between the forces of Kassa Hailu (later known as Tewodros II), and the forces of Birru Goshu of Gojjam. Kassa was victorious, Birru Goshu was captured and spent the next 14 years in chains.

The battle was fought in Gojjam, in the modern Misraq Gojjam Zone. Birru sought to avenge his father, Goshu Zewde, who had been killed in the Battle of Gur Amba two years before. Confident of success, he left his fortress at Jebelli and in March 1854 Kassa Hailu engaged him and defeated him. Birru then tried to use the same tactics he had successfully used against Ras Ali, but his army failed him. As Mordechai Abir notes, "His Gojjamites were no longer fighting the hated Galla who had continuously ravaged their country, but a successful Amhara leader who was able to crush the much-disliked Yejju dynasty. Moreover, Kassa was the idol of the soldiers and his personal bravery became legendary." So when the two armies met again, Birru Goshu's army disintegrated and was taken prisoner. Birru's wife surrendered Jibelli (Jebelli is one of two ambas, or fortified mountaintops, in the valley of the Chamwaga River, and was frequently used as a stronghold by the rulers of Gojjam.) with its arsenal, if she were promised that she would not be reunited with her husband. Afterwards, Birru Goshu was imprisoned on an amba west of Chelga.
