= Aligaz of Yejju =

Ras of Begdemer in the Ethiopian Empire

Aligaz of Yejju (died 1803) was Ras of Begemder, and Inderase (regent) of the Emperor of Ethiopia. He was the son of Abba Seru Gwangul and brother of Ali I of Yejju; he became both Ras and Inderase following Ali's death. Aligaz had four sons: Dejazmach Birru, Dejazmach Gobeze, Dejazmach Faris, and Dejazmach Gojjee.

== Life ==
He fought and killed Wolde Gabriel, the son of Ras Mikael Sehul in the Battle of Madab in 1788. Although that battle immediately restored Tekle Giyorgis as sole Emperor, Ras Ali's death shortly after the battle passed the post of Inderase to Aligaz, who then supported Hezqeyas as Emperor, leaving Tekle Giyorgis to "hang in the wind". Despite lacking any effective base of support, Tekle Giyorgis remained a thorn in Aligaz's side for the following years, even releasing his kindred from the Imperial prison at Wehni in 1789. Aligaz eventually gets control of Tekle Giyorgis when, after two years of living as a shifta, the Emperor came to Aligaz seeking his support but instead was imprisoned at Emakina.

Tekle Giyorgis, however, was not Aligaz's only problem. For much of the first year of Hezqeyas' rule Aligaz could not directly intervene to support this emperor because he had his hands full consolidating his own position amongst the Yejju, which included the opposition from members of his own family such as Dejazmach Alula, the Fitawrari Sadiq, and the Jantirar Yasufe. Crummey records a tradition that Aligaz had wronged his sister Kafay, an injury which might help to explain the apparent conflict between Aligaz and his nephews Gugsa and Alula, for whom he generally appears to be their primary patron.

Further once Tekle Giyorgis was safely out of the picture, his puppet Emperor Hezqeyas met with Abuna Yosab and Ichege Wolde Iyasus where all agreed that they would "not submit to the Galla" -- a clear reference to either Aligaz or his family; the Royal Chronicle records that later that year a battle was fought near Gondar where the Emperor and the two leaders of the Ethiopian church were defeated. "And on the coming of the Galla all that was what was done."

Then, in an attempt to overthrow Aligaz, Haile Wand Bewossen freed Tekle Giyorgis in 1793, after the Emperor had been confined for two years and eight months. Tekle Giyorgis then marched against his rival Emperor, Hezqeyas, who was dwelling at Gondar; Hezqeyas left Gondar and sought the help of Dejazmach Haile Eshte, and they were joined by Aligaz. A series of battles followed that year, which led to Heqzeyas fleeing alone to Dengel Ber.

These defeats also led to Ras Aligaz's fall from leadership of the Yejju. When Hezqeyas returns to Gondar in late 1793 at the head of an army, his supporters include Dejazmach Gugsa, the nephew of Aligaz. After fourteen years as Enderase, Ras Aligaz Gwangul died in 1803 due to an illness. His period of rule was punctuated by significant civil wars and as a result, he did not exercise complete authority continuously throughout his years as Enderase. Ras Asrat and Ras Wolde Gabriel scored decisive victories against him, and at one point, had pushed him out of Begemeder which they ruled for some time. The transfer of power from Aligaz to Gugsa made the sons of Aligaz subservient to him.

== Notes ==
Preceded by Ras Ali	Chief of the Yejju	Succeeded by Ras Gugsa
