= Dejazmach Birru =

Ethiopian noble in the 19th century

Dejazmach Birru Aligaz was a nobleman of 19th century Ethiopia during the Zemene Mesafint. As Dejazmach, he held the governorships of different districts such as Lasta and Dembiya and was made governor of Dawunt, Wollo in 1842 by Ras Ali II of Yejju. He was the son of Ras Aligaz Abba Seru Gwangul, and had a son called Dejazmach Zegeye.

In late 1841, Dejazmach Wube Haile Maryam, governor of Tigray and Semien, who was regarded as one of the most powerful lords of the time, set out to Debre Tabor to depose Ras Ali II from his position as Enderase. Ras Ali II escaped after being defeated, but the victors, who were celebrating their victory fully believing that their enemy was defeated, were surprised by Dejazmach Birru Aligaz, who was Ras Ali's uncle. Dejazmach Birru routed the victors, captured Dejazmach Wube, and helped Ras Ali II regained title. For his help, Dejazmach Birru was made governor of Dawunt in Wello in 1842.

Eleven years after the Battle of Debre Tabor, Dejazmach Birru Aligaz led a force that consisted of several Dejazmachs that included Dejazmach Wube Haile Mariam’s troops, against Kassa Hailu, the future Emperor Tewodros II, at the Battle of Takusa. According to Sven Rubenson, on April 12, 1853, Kassa Hailu fought four Dejazmachs and killed two: Dejazmach Birru Aligaz and Dejazmach Belew.
