= Baeda =

Baeda may refer to several Emperors of Ethiopia:

- Atse Baeda Maryam (1787–1788)
- Baeda Maryam of Ethiopia (1448–1478), nəgusä nägäst of Ethiopia, and member of the Solomonic dynasty
- Baeda Maryam II of Ethiopia, nəgusä nägäst April – December 1795 of Ethiopia
- Baeda Maryam III of Ethiopia, nəgusä nägäst of Ethiopia for a few days in April 1826

It can also refer to Bede, a 7th-century Northumbrian monk
