= Dejazmach Zegeye =

Dejazmach Zegeye Birru was the son of Dejazmach Birru Aligaz. He was the ruler of Yejju until the emergence of Ras Welle Betul. Dejazmach Zegeye had four sons and a daughter: Wagshum Gwangul, Dejazmach Ali, Dejazmach Hailu, Dejazmach Aligaz, and Woizero Hirut.

After the death of Ali Birru, Yejju was ruled by Dejazmach Zegeye Birru, who consolidated his rule of Yejju and at the same time extended it as far as River Ubuye, near the border with Tigray. However, the relationship between Dejazmach Zegeye and that of Emperor Yohannes IV became strained, when the emperor detached the land beyond Alla Wuha and gave it to Ras Gebre Medhin of Tigray as a sign of affection. Apparently this was a time when the Dervishes were moving towards Metema. To defend the motherland from the Dervishes, the emperor ordered Zegeye to mobilize an expeditionary force to Metema. Zegeye pretended that he was ill, but was forced to maneuver his soldiers against the invaders. Still under the pretense of illness, Zegeye went on a stretcher from Yejju to Metema. In Metema, Emperor Yohannes IV died and when Zegaye saw the death of the emperor, he jumped off the stretcher and came back to Yejju.

After his release from Maqdala, Ras Welle Betul, who was the brother of Menelik's wife Empress Taytu Betul, went to Shewa to visit Menelik II whom he knew while in prison in Maqdala under Emperor Tewodros II. After a brief stay, Menelik II bestowed on Welle the title of Ras and appointed him governor of Yejju. This, however, led Dejazmach Zegeye to take up arms against Welle in Lasta. They met at battle, which is sometimes called Dengobat and at other times Gelesoi. There, Dejazmach Zegeye was killed.
