= Battle of Takusa =

1853 battle between Kassa Hailu (Tewodros II) and Yejju dynasties

- Part of Zemene Mesafint
Date	12 April 1853; 173 years ago
Location	Takusa, Begemder Province, Ethiopian Empire
Result	Victory of Kassa Hailu

Belligerents
Loyalists to Kassa Hailu	Yejju, Tigray, Wollo, Gojjam

Commanders and leaders
Kassa Hailu	Dejazmach Birru † Dejazmach Belew †

Casualties and losses
Unknown	Unknown

The Battle of Takusa was a short military engagement fought on 12 April 1853 between the forces of Kassa Hailu, future Emperor of Ethiopia, and an alliance of several rival warlords. The forces of Kassa's enemies were led by Dejazmach Birru Aligaz and Samuel Birhanu, who was reinforced by troops sent to him by Wube Haile Maryam under the command of his son, Gwangul Wube.

According to Sven Rubenson, this battle is famous "as the battle in which he [Kassa] fought four dejazmaches and killed two, Dejazmach Birru Aligaz and Belew."
