= Birru Goshu =

Prince of Gojjam in the Ethiopian Empire

Dejazmach Birru Goshu

Prince of Gojjam
- Reign: 1839-1854
- Predecessor: Goshu Zewde
- Successor: Tedla Gwalu
- Born: ~1814
- Died: 1869
- Spouse: Woizero Yawubdar
- Father: Dejazmach Goshu Zewde
- Religion: Ethiopian Orthodox Tewahedo

Dejazmach Birru Goshu (1814-1869) of Gojjam was a significant Ethiopian noble who held considerable sway over the political landscape of Ethiopia during the latter period of the Zemene Mesafint, a time of intense regional competition among ruling dynasties. According to the British diplomat Walter Plowden, Birru Goshu was "the most remarkable man in Abyssinia" before the rise of Tewodros II.

== Appearance and personality ==
Walter Plowden who was a guest at Birru's court in the 1840s described him thus:

The eye rests on a figure tall and imposing, and upon a countenance the most striking, without exception, I ever beheld—the nose slightly Roman; the mouth, in moments of repose, determined, when smiling, delightful, but in dropping into an expression of displeasure, savage; his hair (though scarce thirty years of age), fallen off from the centre of the forehead to the crown of his head—they say from the use of 'perfumes,'—is on each side luxuriantly black and curling, and gives a fine effect to a high and ample front; and his eyes (though I have seen many more beautiful), the only ones I know that justify the word 'piercing' in its strongest sense, seeming to defy scrutiny, and appearing to observe nothing, while nothing escapes them; their general expression is that of quiet triumph. When enraged, he speaks with extreme slowness and emphasis, but is never loud; his forehead and face become black and clouded, and his eyes, usually so glittering, dull and lowering. I dwell upon his personal traits, from a feeling of regret that my artistic powers were not sufficient to delineate the only face in Ethiopia that inspired me with that desire.

The French traveler Arnaud d'Abbadie also gives a long description of the character of Birru Goshu:

Everything about him indicated intelligence, passion, cruel energy, and exquisite sensitivity; yet he lacked the crowning attribute of a superior tyrant: the impassivity of the face and gaze. [...] His bearing proclaimed pride, haughtiness, and a certain dominating elan that denoted that his fortune was rising. [...] He was carried away by his prejudices as by his preferences; his friendships, always passion-driven, all ended in bloodshed. [...] Jealous and envious of all superiority; today good, sensitive, even tender, tomorrow harsh, cruel, with sarcasm on the lips. Sometimes words erupted from him like a storm, like a volcanic explosion: he revealed then his most secret intentions; sometimes it was in silence that he accumulated his resolutions, his ruses, his baseness, and that he built his projects. Such a character could not be strong in a continuous way; hence his excessive dissimulation and distrust.

== Career ==
The illegitimate son of Ras Goshu Zewde, governor of Gojjam, Birru gained recognition for his independence and ambition as a leader in the Tana region. His early political strategy included an alliance with his father and an influential partnership with Ras Ali Alula of the prominent Yejju family, which was strengthened by his marriage to Ali's sister.

As conflicts escalated, Birru eventually turned against his father, defeating him in battle. In 1842, he allied with Wube Haile Maryam of Tigray in an attempt to unseat Ras Ali, at the Battle of Debra Tabor though this effort proved unsuccessful. Despite this failure, Birru managed to retain control over Gojjam, effectively resisting Ras Ali's authority throughout the 1840s. During this period, Birru also pursued diplomatic connections with Europe, fostering relationships with Belgian consul Blondeel van Ceulebrock and the French d'Abbadie brothers, who visited Gojjam. In a preserved letter addressed to the Superior of the Sacra Congregation de Propaganda Fide, he notably styled himself as “the King of Gojjam” and requested an artisan's assistance.

The rise of Kassa Hailu of Qwara, the future Emperor Tewodros II, marked the end of Birru's political career. Defeated by Kassa at the Battle of Amba Jebelli in March 1854, Birru was captured and spent nearly fifteen years imprisoned in the fortress of Maqdala. Although released in 1868, he had lost his political influence and withdrew from public life. Later, he was detained in an amba west of Chelga, and in 1869, Tekle Giyorgis II—Tewodros II's successor—sentenced him to death by hanging.
