= Goshu Zewde =

Prince of Gojjam in the Ethiopian Empire

Ras Goshu Zewde

Prince of Gojjam
- Reign: 1825-1852
- Predecessor: Zewde
- Born: 1783 or 1788
- Died: November 1852 (aged 64-69)
- Spouse: Woizero Sahlitu Inqu
- Issue: Lij Dori; Birru Goshu; Tessemma Goshu; Negussie Goshu
- Father: Dejazmach Zewde Silin
- Mother: Woizero Dinkinesh Hailu
- Religion: Ethiopian Orthodox Tewahedo

Goshu Zewde of Gojjam (1783 or 1788–1852), also known by his horse name Abba Kanno, was a prominent governor of Damot, Mecha, and Yibaba during the first half of the 19th century. While his son Birru Goshu governed most of Gojjam, Goshu's influence extended widely, solidifying his reputation as a formidable leader. As a member of the ruling dynasty of Gojjam, he was one of the significant lords in the last decades of the Zemene Mesafint. Respected by Princesses, church leaders, and farmers alike, Goshu was admired for his noble lineage and his admirable character. His influence and dedication were further recognized when he was granted the title of Dejazmach in 1825 and elevated to Ras by Emperor Sahle Dengel in 1848.

== Appearance ==
The French explorer Arnaud d'Abbadie, who was a close friend of Goshu described him thus:

Dedjadj Goshu, about fifty years old, was tall and of fine presence, fat without being obese; but the lower part of his body seemed slender compared to his powerful bust. He had fine features and a feminine hand, a copper-brown complexion, a voluminous head, gracefully set on a long and beautifully contoured neck, rare in a man, a broad, high, and domed forehead, delicately drawn temples, a small nose with mobile wings, and large eyes. A light down shaded his upper lip; his teeth were small, pearly, and his chin short, fine, and cleft; his cheeks were flat, wide, and beardless.

His bearing and every movement were softly dominant; his reserved gaze hinted at a certain self-satisfaction. Although his intelligent face was veiled with the impassivity suitable for the exercise of high power, one discovered a great goodness, timid rather than active, finesse, enjoyment, a lack of decision combined with obstinacy, a spirit of adventure, intrepidity, and that melancholic doubt that often affects those who have the responsibility of events and men.

His toga, carefully draped, revealed three long necklaces composed of pearls or talismans covered in red morocco leather or vermeil, intertwined with coral, amber, or rare glass beads. He wore on his little finger a gold ring, formed of three interlocking rings, each adorned with an emerald; this ancient jewel, admirably crafted, came from India. A long gold pin, terminated by a filigree ball, was passed through his black, thick, wavy, and curled hair; as a Waizoro, he wore on his ankles periscelides composed of small gold cones strung together.

== Family ==
Goshu Zewde belonged through his mother, Woizero Dinkinesh to the imperial family: she was the granddaughter of Walata Israel, daughter of Empress Mentewab by her first husband and half-sister of Emperor Iyasu II. His father, the Dejazmach Zewde, of partial Oromo origin and Governor of Damot, had died captive of Ras Gugsa, against whom he had fought for several years. Dejazmach Goshu had two legitimate sons by his wife, Woizero Sahlitu Inqu : Lij Dori and Dejazmach Tessemma Goshu, the latter being the father of Adal, who later took the name of Negus Tekle Haymanot. He also had several illegitimate children, among whom were Dejazmach Birru Goshu and Negussie Goshu.

== Career ==
Goshu Zewde embarked on a significant military and political journey throughout the early 19th century as a prominent governor of Gojjam and Damot. His early campaigns included an expedition against the Kutay Oromo, and in the 1820s, he defeated an army sent by Ras Gugsa Märsa, led by Dejazmach Gubāna. However, his forces suffered a defeat in 1827 at the Battle of Kosso Ber, where the combined forces of Goshu and Dejazmach Maru of Dembiya were overpowered by Dejazmach Wube Haile Maryam of Semien and Ras Yimam Gugsa. Maru perished, and his properties were awarded to Ras Marye Gugsa. Goshu narrowly escaped, retreating to the mountain fortress of Gébäla.

In 1828, Goshu launched a campaign against Dejazmach Maétäntu, an appointee of Ras Marye, but failed and was subsequently imprisoned in the Qwami Carq cave. One of his sons later freed him and defeated Marye in the Battle of Sägädit. Despite these setbacks, Goshu's forces later allied with Wube and Marye against Sabagadis Woldu in 1831. During the 1830s and 1840s, he led successful campaigns against the Machaa Oromo near Ennarea but eventually established a form of peace with them, even exchanging gifts with Abba Bagibo.

In 1839, Goshu orchestrated the marriage of his son Birru to the sister of Ras Ali Alula. In doing so, he secured Ras Ali's favor, who disinherited the sons of the recently deceased Dejazmach Kenfu Hailu in favor of Goshu and Birru. This move sparked conflict when Kenfu's children resisted, leading to the Battle of Qwénzéla (Déngél Bärr) on October 4, 1839, in which Goshu emerged victorious. However, Ras Ali eventually transferred Kenfu's lands to his mother Menen, displeasing Birru, who rebelled and allied with Wube Haile Maryam to oppose Ali.

In 1847, Goshu, troubled by the treatment of Abuna Salama and the Ichege in Gondär, invaded Begemder and looted Gondär, taking the Ichege prisoner. By the end of this campaign in 1848, Emperor Sahle Dengel elevated him to the rank of Ras. Goshu was also open to foreign visitors, notably hosting his close friend Arnauld d'Abbadie and the Belgian consul Blondeel van Coelebroeck. In 1841, he requested missionaries from the consul to be sent to Gojjam.

Kassa Haylu, later Emperor Tewodros II, served under Goshu early in his career and distinguished himself as a soldier, earning a horse and a lämd from Goshu. This service provided Kassa with access to Ras Ali's inner circle. However, when Kassa rebelled against his father-in-law, Ras Ali, Goshu remained loyal to Ali. In January 1852, Goshu and Birru attempted to reclaim Gondar from Kassa's control but eventually withdrew, only to loot Fogära and destroy the Qwärata monastery. Later that year, Ras Ali deployed Goshu against Kassa in the Battle of Gur Amba, where Goshu was ultimately defeated and killed in November 1852.

Among Goshu's sons, Birru Goshu became a key political and military figure, often at odds with both his father and Kassa Haylu. His other son, Fitawrari Tessemma, governed Gawe in Damot from his capital in Cago, the ancestral homeland. Tessemma's son, Adal, would later rise to power as Negus Tekle Haymanot. However, shortly after Goshu's death, Tessemma was captured by Tewodros and died in the prison of Arba Amba.
