= Atse Baeda Maryam =

Proclaimed Emperor of Ethiopia

- Reign: 18th-century
- Predecessor: Iyasu
- Successor: Tekle Haymanot
- Dynasty: Ethiopian Empire

Atse Baeda Maryam was proclaimed Emperor (nəgusä nägäst) (1787 – 1788) of Ethiopia in Tigray and Gojjam by Dejazmach Wolde Gabriel, the son of Ras Mikael Sehul, who was opposed to Ras Ali of Begemder.

== Reign ==
Joined by Ras Haile Yosadiq and Dejazmach Gebre Masqal, Wolde Gabriel met Ras Ali, the Emperor Tekle Giyorgis I, and their supporters in the Battle of Madab, where the allies were defeated. Dejazmach Wolde Gabriel was killed in battle and Baeda Maryam was captured. However, Atse Baeda Maryam's followers would not surrender, and elevated Tekle Haymanot to replace him.

Baeda Maryam is sometimes given the title Atse, a less familiar Amharic word for "Emperor", to distinguish him from the other Emperors of Ethiopia with the same name. Because he was not recognized as a legitimate ruler, he is not assigned a throne name.
