= Abba Seru Gwangul =

Abba Seru Gwangul (died 1778) was a Son of Aba Getiye. Aba Getiye was a descendant of Sheikh Omar, who was a Yemeni that settled in Ethiopia. most commonly referred to as a Wara Sheh, which means "Sons of the Sheikh".

The Wara Sheh began to have prominence with the emergence of Aba Gwangul who married Weyzero Gelebu, the daughter of the Tigrayan Ras Faris who was first governor Salawa and Lasta, then part of Tigray, and later became Governor General of Tigray. Abba Seru Gwangul had numerous children including Dejazmach Welle, Dejazmach Kormi, Abeto Yimer, and Woizero Aster. With his wife Woizero Gelebu, daughter of Tigrayan Ras Faris, Abba Seru Gwangul had Ras Ali, Ras Aligaz and Woizero Kefey.

Aba Gwangul's descendants came to control Begemder and parts of Wollo, and his heirs were Enderases (Regents) of the Ethiopian Empire and rulers of the Zemene Mesafint.

The Scottish explorer James Bruce met him in 1770, and recorded a vivid description of this man in his account of travels in Ethiopia:

He was a little, thin, cross-made man, of no apparent strength or swiftness, as far as could be conjectured; his legs and thighs being thin and small for his body, and his head large; he was of a yellow, unwholesome colour, not black nor brown; he had long hair plaited and interwoven with the bowels of oxen, and so knotted and twisted together as to render it impossible to distinguish the hair from the bowels, which hung down in long strings, part before his bread and part behind his shoulder, the most extraordinary ringlets I had ever seen. He had likewise, a wreath of guts hung about his neck, and several rounds of the fame about his middle, which served as a girdle, below which was a short cotton cloth dipt in butter, and all his body was wet, and running down with the same; he seemed to be about fifty years of age, with a confident and insolent superiority painted in his face. In his country it seems, when he appears in state, the beast he rides upon is a cow. He was then in full dress and ceremony, and mounted upon one, not of the largest sort, but which had monstrous horns. He had no saddle on his cow. He had short drawers, that did not reach the middle of his thighs; his knees, feet, legs, and all his body were bare. Whether it was necessary for the poizing himself upon the sharp ridge of the beast's back, or whether it was meant as graceful riding, I do not know, being quite unskilled in cowmanship; but he leaned exceedingly backwards, putting his belly forwards, and holding his left arm and shield stretched out on one side of him, and his right, arm and lance in the same way on the other, like wings. The king (Tekle Haymanot II)was seated on his ivory chair, to receive him, almost in the middle of his tent; the day was very hot, and an insufferable stench of carrion soon made every one in the tent sensible of the approach of this nasty sovereign, even before they saw him. The king, when he perceived him coming, was so struck with the whole figure and appearance, that he could not contain himself from an immoderate fit of laughter, which finding it impossible to stifle, he rose from his chair, and ran as hard as he could into another apartment behind the throne. The savage got off from his cow at the door of the tent with all his tripes about him; and, while we were admiring him as a monster, seeing the king's seat empty, he took it for his own, and down he sat upon the crimson silk cushion, with the butter running from every part of him. A general cry of astonishment was made by every person in the tent: he started up I believe without divining the cause, and before he had time to recollect himself, they fell all upon him, and with pushes and blows drove this greasy chieftain to the door of the tent, flaring with wild amazement, not knowing what was next to happen. It is high treason, and punishable by immediate death, to sit down upon the king's chair. Poor Guangoul owed his life to his ignorance. The king had beheld the whole scene through the curtain; if he laughed heartily at the beginning, he laughed ten times more at the catastrophe; he came out laughing, and unable to speak.

== Notes ==
| Preceded by none | Chief of the Yejju | Succeeded by Ras Ali |
