= Ali I of Yejju =

Ras of Begdemer in the Ethiopian Empire

Ali I of Yejju (died 18 June 1788) was Ras of Begemder, and following the death of Ras Mikael Sehul, Regent of the Emperor of Ethiopia. He was the son of Abba Seru Gwangul, chieftain of the Yejju, and Woizero Gelebu Faris, daughter of Ras Faris of Tigray.

According to Abir, he founded the town of Debre Tabor, which became the capital of his dynasty. However, from the accounts in the Royal chronicle Ali is never mentioned as dwelling at Debre Tabor, instead he is more closely tied to Filakit Gereger (called Garagara in the Royal chronicle).

== Life ==
One of the first steps in the advancement of Ali's career came in August 1781 when the Emperor Tekle Giyorgis I summoned him to his court and made him Balambaras. Two years later, while still a Balambaras he took part in the Emperor's abortive march on Shewa, which failed to cross the Checheho River. Ten months later, Ali joined Ras Haile Yosadiq and together conspired to depose the emperor, defeating him at Afarwanat, after which Tekle Giyorgis fled into exile at Amba Sel. Subsequently, the two nobles brought Iyasu Atsequ down from Wehni and made him Emperor 18 February 1784; in return, Ali was promoted to Dejazmach.

Ali took several steps to consolidate his position and prepare his way to the next rank of power, Ras Betowedded. One was to offer his niece Anqualit to the influential Dejazmach Hailu Eshte of Begemder. This alliance led to conflict between Ali and his former ally Ras Haile Yosadiq, and to Ali's decision to recall the Emperor Tekle Haymanot from exile in 1786 and restore him to power; in response, Ras Haile Yosadiq prudently provided a refuge to the deposed Emperor Iyasu in Gojjam. Another step was the systematic capture of the ambas of Balambaras Ramkha, which ended with the Balambaras' death in the sack of his base at Limon. Shortly after this, Ali was released from the excommunication that had been placed on him, and kept the feast of St. Gabriel the Archangel. A third step, which was not unique to Ali but taken by many of the warlords of the time, was to dissolve or reorganize the existing military units and create new ones, and granting them lands to support the soldiers. This would make the soldiers dependent on the warlord for their livings, not the Emperor.

Eventually Ras Haile Yosaq was able to recruit Dejazmach Wolde Gabriel, the son of Ras Mikael Sehul to join him, and when it appeared Ali (who had managed by that time to obtain a promotion to Ras) was preoccupied with the rebellion of his relative Yasufe in Lasta, proclaimed Baeda Maryam emperor. A peace was quickly patched up with Yasufe, and Ras Ali then turned his attention to this new threat. On the Thursday before Easter 1788, Ras Ali, Dejazmach Hailu Eshte, and the Emperor Tekle Giyorgis I met the allied forces of Ras Haile Yosadiq, Dejazmach Gebre, and Wolde Gabriel in the Battle of Madab. Ras Ali defeated this opponents; Dejazmach Wolde Gabriel was killed in battle and the pretender Baeda Maryam was captured. Only Ras Haile Yosadiq managed to escape the battle back to his territories in Gojjam.

Ras Ali died from an illness at Filakit Gereger, which the writer of the Royal chronicle claims was caused by his heavy drinking, and was buried at Lalibela.

== Notes ==
Preceded by Abba Seru Gwangul	Chief of the Yejju	Succeeded by Ras Aligaz
