= Chambers Biographical Dictionary =

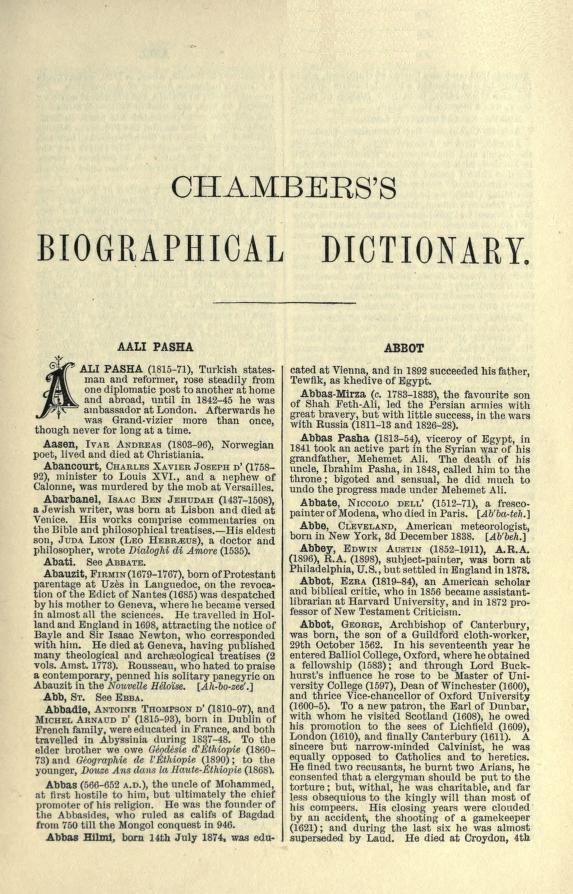
Chambers's Biographical Dictionary, 1912 edition, first page

Chambers Biographical Dictionary provides concise descriptions of over 18,000 notable figures from Britain and the rest of the world. It was first published in 1897.

The publishers, Chambers Harrap, who were formerly based in Edinburgh, claim their Biographical Dictionary is the most comprehensive and authoritative single-volume biographical dictionary available, covering entries in such areas as sport, science, music, art, literature, politics, television, and film. The 1990 reprint is published by University Press, Cambridge.

== Editions ==
The 5th edition, published in 1990, was edited by Magnus Magnusson.

The centenary edition of 1997 (ISBN 0-550-16060-4) was edited by Melanie Parry and the revised edition (ISBN 0-550-18022-2) was edited by J. O. Thorne and T. C. Collocott. The centenary edition contained well over 17,500 alphabetically arranged articles describing the nationality, occupation, and achievements of each person, as well as 250 panels which focus on a wide variety of individuals regarded as being particularly important, influential, and interesting. Sources are given and there are thousands of suggestions for further reading.

The 9th edition was published in 2011 and has biographies of over 18,000 people, most consisting of about a dozen lines in a two-column page layout. Some, however, run to 50 lines or more, while Shakespeare covers two pages. Entries typically consist of place of birth, a summary on education or career, and achievements or publications. A single reference source is usually given.

== Bibliography ==
- Chambers, ed., Joan Bakewell, introduction: Chambers Biographical Dictionary, 9th edition, 2011, Chambers, 1,278 pages. ISBN 978-0550106933.
