= Gugsa of Yejju =

Ras of Begemder in the Ethiopian Empire

Gugsa of Yejju (died 23 May 1825) was a Ras of Begemder (circa 1798 until his death), and Inderase (regent) of the Emperor of Ethiopia. According to Nathaniel Pearce, he took the Christian name of Wolde Mikael. He was the son of Mersu Barentu and Kefey, the sister of Ras Aligaz. Both Bahru Zewde and Paul B. Henze consider his reign as Ras and Enderase as the peak of the Yejju Dynasty during the Zemene Mesafint.

In order to strength his relationships with the most powerful Christian rulers on the western side of the Takkaze, Gugsa married one of his daughters to Dejazmach Maru of Dembiya, and his other Daughter, Hirut, to Dejazmach Haile Maryam of Seimien.

When Gugsa became Ras of Begemder, as mentioned in the contemporary Royal Chronicle and later in Gabra Sellase's chronicle of Menelik's reign, he made his capital at a place called Lebo, a mountainous district some 60 kilometers south-east of Gondar. Upon becoming Regent, Ras Gugsa reasserted the central power of the Empire (although keeping the Emperor as a figurehead) by dispossessing the nobility of the parts of Ethiopia he controlled, primarily Begemder. He accomplished this by proclaiming in 1800 in the name of the Emperor the legal title of land tenure would be converted from freeholds to state property, held at the will of the Emperor. At first the peasantry welcomed this egalitarian measure, believing that they would benefit from the loss of their masters. However, as Ras Gugsa proceeded in dispossessing the great families each year under one pretext or another, the peasants lost their last defenders. "The dispossessed nobles," writes Pankhurst, "meanwhile, almost all became soldiers of fortune. They were so rapacious that sometimes whole villages abandoned their lands and emigrated to neighboring territories, many of the peasantry enrolling in the army, as they preferred the perils and independence of a military life to the servitude of the field."

In 1803, Ras Gugsa entered into the ongoing doctrinal disputes that divided the Ethiopian Church by joining the Ichege Wolde Yona in expelling the advocates of the Qebat from Begemder. About the same time, the Ras exploited the helplessness of the ecclesiastical structure on the death of Abuna Yosab III by plundering the episcopal properties 12 September of that year.

Ras Gugsa had a non-violent death and was buried at the church of Iyasus in Debre Tabor.

== Notes ==
Preceded by Ras Aligaz	Chief of the Yejju	Succeeded by Ras Yimam
