= Battle of Madab =

- Part of Zemene Mesafint
Date	June 1788
Location	Madab, Ethiopia
Result	Allied victory

Belligerents
Negus Tekle Giyorgis I Ras Ali I of Yejju Hailu Eshte	Ras Haliu Yosadiq Dejazmach Gebre Masqal Wolde Gabriel †

The Battle of Madab was fought in June 1788 in Ethiopia between the forces of Emperor Tekle Giyorgis I, Ras Ali, and Haliu Eshte against the forces Ras Haliu Yosadiq, Wolde Gabriel, and Dejazmach Gebre Masqal. Wolde Gabriel was killed in the battle and the allied forces won.
