= Battle of Debre Tabor =

Ethiopian battle in 1842

| Date | 7 February 1842 |
| Location | Debre Tabor |

Belligerents
| Loyalists to Ali | Loyalists to Wube Hailemariam |

Commanders and leaders
| Ali II of Yejju; Birru Aligaz; Dejazmach Merso | Wube Haile Maryam; Birru Goshu |

Strength
| ~30,000 | ~30,000 |

The Battle of Debre Tabor was a conflict during the Zemene Mesafint in 1842 initiated by Dejazmach Wube Haile Maryam to overthrow Ras Ali II as Regent of the Emperor of Ethiopia and gain control of Ethiopia. This confused battle was won by Ras Ali, but at a steep price, and this victory failed to cement his position as the most powerful nobleman of his time.

Dejazmach Wube's strategy against Ras Ali depended on his ability to import more firearms, which would provide him with a tactical superiority that would more than outweigh the vaunted cavalry of Ras Ali's Oromo kinsmen, and to obtain an Abuna for the Ethiopian Church, who would help unite the demoralized Christian population behind him. Wube made several appeals to obtain firearms from European governments, but did not succeed in obtaining any until the middle of 1841 when Theophile Lefebvre returned from France with a small quantity of weapons and a number of artisans who immediately began to repair a cannon Wube had obtained from Ras Wolde Selassie and manufacture war materials. About the same time, he learned that a new Abuna was on his way to Ethiopia, Abuna Salama III, who arrived in Ethiopia in the last months of 1841. With this success, the Dejazmach lost all discretion and he treated the envoys of Ras Ali with contempt, and announced that he would defeat Ras Ali, who he claimed was still a Muslim at heart, and install Tekle Giyorgis, related to the Solomonic dynasty, on the Imperial throne in Gondar.

Once Abuna Salama arrived in Wube's camp the Dejazmach marched into Begemder, where with the help of Birru Goshu he captured Gondar, then the allies continued south against Ras Ali's army. The two forces met near Debre Tabor 7 February 1842; Ras Ali had summoned nearly 30,000 soldiers to support him, amongst whom were Wube's brother Dejazmach Merso and Ali's uncle Dejazmach Birru Aligaz. Mordechai Abir observes that this "was clearly a battle between the Christian Amhara and Tigrean elements and the Oromo, fighting desperately to preserve their predominant position in northern Ethiopia."

Although the two forces were equal in numbers, Dejazmach Wube's superiority in firearms carried the day. Ras Ali escaped the battlefield with a number of his followers, and with possession of the battlefield the Dejazmach and his ally Birru Goshu settled down to a feast to celebrate their victory. At that moment they were surprised by a small detachment under Dejazmach Birru Aligaz, who captured Dejazmach Wube and chased Birru Goshu across the Abbay River into Gojjam. Released from his imprisonment, Ras Ali grudgingly rewarded his uncle with the governorship of Daunt, a district along the border of Amhara and Wello; Dejazmach Merso was given Wube's territories in Tigray.

Despite this victory, Ras Ali was in a worse position than before the battle. His enemies were still operating in Gojjam, Damot, Dembiya, and Lasta; the clergy was still hostile to him, and his own Christian subjects in Begemder and Amhara were even more disaffected. To secure the Abuna's help, he was forced to free Dejazmach Wube and go to war against his ally Dejazmach Merso to help Wube recover his territories. His Moslem allies in Welo, alarmed at the Christian Birru Aligaz being invested on their borders, likewise grew disaffected. Ras Ali was forced to seek help elsewhere, and sought it from the Egyptians, who at the moment were consolidating their hold on Sudan. Although in the short term a beneficial move, this only served to further erode his local support, leading to a vicious cycle leading to Ras Ali's eventual defeat by a competent rival—the future Emperor Tewodros II.
