= Shifta =

East African term for a rebel, outlaw, and/or bandit

Shifta is a term mostly used in Ethiopia, Eritrea, Kenya, Tanzania, and Somalia that can be translated as "bandit" or "outlaw", but can include anyone who rebels against an authority or an institution that is seen as illegitimate, like the Arbegnoch guerillas during the Italian occupation of Ethiopia. The Swahili word was loaned from the Somali shufta during the Shifta War, and is in turn derived from Amharic ሽፍታ (šəfta).

Historically, the shifta served as a local militia in particularly remote, rural and often lawless parts of the Horn of Africa, namely the Ethiopian Highlands.

This word had a heroic or anti-heroic connotation rather than a villainous character (similar to the historical romanticization of the legendary outlaw Robin Hood in western society), over time, the term has taken on a more villainous meaning.

== Concept ==
The term shifta has positive and negative connotations, that of a common bandit and that of a revolutionary; both concepts being distinct, but not necessarily mutually exclusive. They are often considered as highly respected, politically-minded outlaws struggling for social order or a political cause. When applied in this context, shiftinnet (being a shifta) in its diverse forms has a social function as a form of conflict resolution.

== History ==
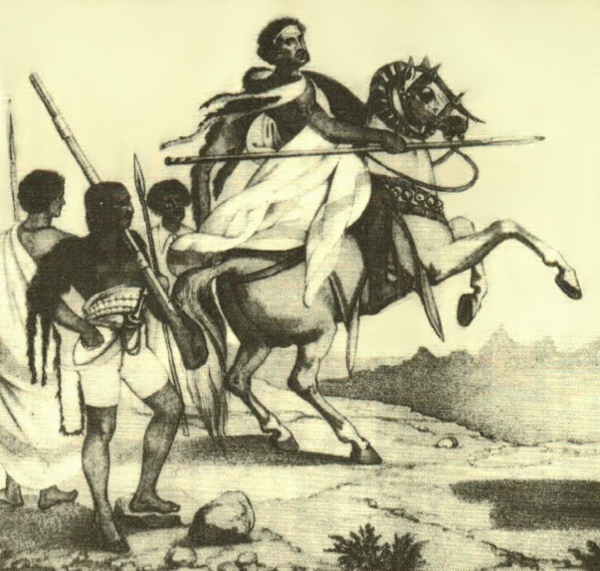
Ethiopian warriors in 1770, during the Zemene Mesafint

One of the first mentions of shifta-like activity in the region comes from the Portuguese in medieval Ethiopia who stated that, due to the country's mountainous nature, rebels could hide out in the countryside, evading capture by imperial troops, setting up ambushes, and subsisting off the local land for months. The idea of the shifta as a form of law enforcement in east Africa likely comes from northern Ethiopian societies historical propensity for blood feud (Amharic: ደም መላሽ, romanized: Demelash, lit. '"blood returner", "blood answerer"'). A common occurrence in many Middle Eastern, North African, and Horn African cultures, it plays a larger role in Amhara and Agew culture as those wanted for murder can easily escape arrest due to the rugged and difficult-to-traverse topography of the Ethiopian Highlands, leading next of kin to take matters into their own hands.

In Ethiopia, individuals who started as shifta rose to the level of regional head or Emperor thereby legitimizing the concept of shifta itself. Two nineteenth-century shiftas, Kassa Hailu of Gondar and Kassa Mercha of Tigre, became Emperor Tewodros and Emperor Yohannes respectively in the late 19th century. Thus the shiftas formed the military elite and became the core of the resistance, using their military skills against the Italians. Conventionally, however, a shifta whose acts trespassed social norms would be called t'era-shifta and would be regarded as a thief or bandit. Nevertheless, to be described as a shifta, especially during the Italian occupation, was an honor for an Ethiopian and this was how resistance started and spread. In Eritrea, during the British administration, military units were used to police the lawless areas and stop common shifta activity.

In recent times, both prime ministers Isaias Afewerki of Eritrea and Meles Zenawi of Ethiopia were called shifta when they served, respectively, as rebel leaders of the EPLF and TPLF, along with members of the 21st century Amhara ethnic nationalist Fano.

== See also ==
- Brigandage
- Shifta War, (1963–1967) in northeastern Kenya
- Klepht, a similar status in Greece.
- Arbegnoch
- Fano (militia)
