= Battle of Gur Amba =

- Part of Zemene Mesafint
| Date | 27 November 1852 |
| Location | Gur Amba, Ethiopia 12.367°N 37.367°E |
| Result | Victory for Kassa Hailu |

Commanders and leaders
| Goshu Zewde † | Dejazmach Kassa Hailu |

The Battle of Gur Amba was fought on 27 November 1852 between the forces of the Ethiopian regent, Ras Ali II, and the rebel forces of Kassa Hailu. Kassa was victorious, and Goshu Zewde of Mota, Gojjam, the commander of the regent's forces, was killed. This was the first of a series of four victories which led to Kassa becoming Emperor Tewodros II of Ethiopia.

This battle followed three years of peace between Kassa and Ras Ali, which ended in 1852 when Kassa refused to respond to Ali's summons. Ras Ali dispatched a large army to Agawmeder after his rebellious vassal, and Kassa responded by moving to a fortified position near Dengel Ber. Ras Ali's officers found Kassa's position too strong to attack, so they bypassed it by moving to Dembiya, where they waited out the rainy season. Ras Ali then decided to give the job of destroying Kassa to another of his vassals, Goshu Zewde, and announced at the start of September he had given Kassa's lands to Goshu, Sven Rubenson noting that "Ali probably did not care whether his overt enemy or his ally would be destroyed."

The two armies spent much of September maneuvering for position until at last Kassa brought his men down into the plains of Dembiya. Amazed that Kassa would make what appeared to be an obvious mistake, Goshu's men immediately charged, and after a full day's combat, in which both sides suffered heavily, Kassa killed his opposing general and completely routed his opponent's men, who fled back to Gojjam.
