= Kenfu Hailu =

Ethiopian governor (1800–1839)

Kenfu Hailu (Note: Kenfu Hailu is also spelled in various sources as Kenfu Haylu, Kinfu Haylu) (born ca. 1800 – 1839 in Fenja) was one of the figures of the Zemene Mesafint era. He was the older half brother of Emperor Tewodros II, who came of age at his court. Kenfu is remembered for his victory over the Ottoman invaders in 1837.

== Biography ==
=== Background ===
Kenfu was the oldest son of Amhara noblemen Hailu Wolde Giorgis, the governor of Qwara by Woizero Walatta Tekle. His mother, Walatta Tekle was the niece of Maru of Dembiya, a powerful dejazmach ruling over large swath of territories in north-west Ethiopia known as Maru Qemas.

Maru Qemas covered the territories of Dembiya, Qwara and parts of Gojjam. Before Maru, the area was governed by dejazmach Wolde Giyorgis, the father of Hailu Wolde Giyorgis, and grandfather of Kenfu.

Kenfu's had two known siblings mentioned by the sources. A full brother by the name of Gebru Hailu, and his much younger paternal half brother, Kassa Hailu, later to be enthroned as Tewodros II, one of Ethiopia's most iconic Emperors.

=== Rise to power ===
In 1827, following the death of Maru, his uncle. Kenfu inherited his dominion of Maru Qemas, which he ruled from Fenja in Dembiya. In the early 1830s, Kenfu was frequently allied with Dori Gugsa, or with the rising Wube Haile Maryam during conflicts. His former ally, Dori, feared Kenfu's growing popularity, and threw him in chains. Kenfu was later freed after Dori's death a few months later.

=== Conflict with Ottoman Egypt ===
In April 1837, the Ottomans invaded Ethiopian territory. Kenfu and his forces engaged this threat on April 22, 1837, and defeated the Ottomans at the Battle of Wadkaltabu. His fame soared after this event, and numerous Qene were composed celebrating his victory.

A passage from the Royal Chronicles

Dejazmach Kenfu preserved the country in peace against oppressors and robbers.
He cut off the hands of brigands and thieves.

So the country he ruled could rest quiet from the violence of the soldiery; rich and poor rejoiced in his rule.
In his day was abundance and famine ceased.

In his day it was heard that the Turks had come and encamped at Metemma.
When he heard of this, the whole country was alarmed and all made supplications (for help) with loud lamentation.

Dejazmach Kenfu said 'Have no fear; be not afraid. So long I am not dead, you shall not die.'

— David Mathew,

=== Kenfu in letters ===
In 1838, French traveller Antoine Thomson d'Abbadie carried two letters from Emperor Sahle Dengel to Queen Victoria of Britain, and Louis Philippe of France. Kenfu Hailu is mentioned in the letters as one of the three most powerful lords of Ethiopia, the two others being Ras Ali, and Wube Haile Maryam (with a notable absence of the strongman of Shewa, Negus Sahle Selassie).

== Influence on Tewodros II ==
As a child, Kassa Hailu received church education at the convent of Tekla Haymanot, between Gondar and Lake Tana. He managed to escape a massacre that saw his fellow students killed by a defeated Oromo chieftain taking his vengeance on the children of the victors. Kassa fled to his half-brother Kenfu for protection. Kenfu took Kassa into his court as retainer, this being a way to train young members of the nobility in administration, etiquette, justice and politics. Kassa learned to read and write, and became familiar with the Bible and Ethiopian literature.

While with Kenfu, he was also taught the techniques of Ethiopian warfare. Kassa barely escaped with his life, when he joined in the battle against the Ottomans. Kenfu emerged the victor, and this must have left a lasting imprint on the mind of the teenager Kassa.

A Qene celebrating Kenfu was documented in the chronicle of Emperor Tewodros II.
