= History of Ethiopia =

Ethiopia is one of the oldest countries in Africa; the emergence of Ethiopian civilization dates back thousands of years. Abyssinia or rather "Ze Etiyopia" was inhabited by Abyssinians (Habesha), specifically the Amhara and Tigrayans (speakers of Semitic languages) and the Cushitic, Oromo and Agaw. The Eastern escarpment of the Ethiopian highlands and the lowlands were the home of the various Muslim groups that formed the Ifat and Adal sultanates such as the Argobba, Afars, Harari/Harla and Somalis. In the central and south were found the ancient Sidama, Semitic Gurage and Omotic Wolaita, among others. One of the first kingdoms to rise to power in the territory was the kingdom of Damot in the 10th century BC, which established its capital at Yeha. In the first century AD, the Aksumite Kingdom rose to power in the modern Tigray Region with its capital at Aksum and grew into a major power on the Red Sea, subjugating Meroe and its surrounding areas. In the early fourth century, during the reign of Ezana, Christianity was declared the state religion and not long after, the Aksumite empire fell into decline with the rise of Islam in the Arabian peninsula, which slowly shifted trade away from the Christian Aksum. It eventually became isolated, its economy slumped and Aksum's commercial domination of the region ended. The Aksumites gave way to the Zagwe dynasty, who established a new capital at Lalibela before giving way to the Solomonic dynasty in the 13th century. During the early Solomonic period, Ethiopia underwent military reforms and imperial expansion, allowing it to dominate the Horn of Africa.

== Etymology ==
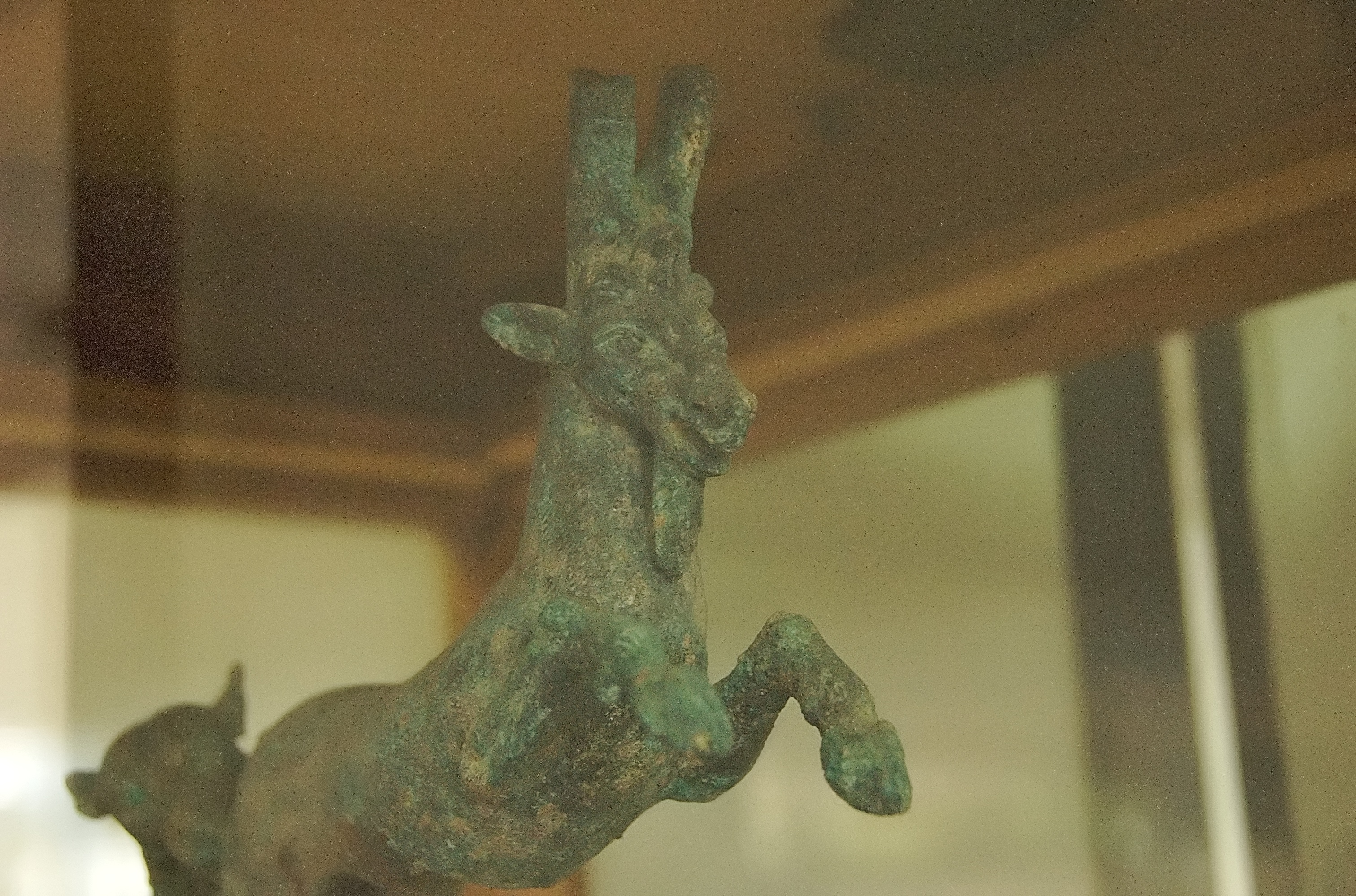
Leaping Ibex, found in northern Ethiopia, probably created around the first century BC in D'mt.

The Greek name Αἰθιοπία (from Αἰθίοψ, Aithiops, "an Ethiopian") is a compound word, later explained as derived from the Greek words αἴθω and ὤψ (aithō "I burn" + ōps "eye"), sharing the same root as the Greek word Cyclops, which literally means "round-eye" (kyklos + ops). According to the Liddell-Scott Jones Greek-English Lexicon, the designation properly translates as fiery-eye in noun form and red-brown in adjectival form. The historian Herodotus used the appellation to denote those parts of Africa south of the Sahara that were then known within the Ecumene (habitable world). The earliest mention of the term is found in the works of Homer, where it is used to refer to two people groups, one in Africa and one in the east from eastern Turkey to India. In ancient times, the name Ethiopia was primarily used about the modern-day nation of Sudan which is based in the Upper Nile valley and is located south of Egypt, also called Kush, and then secondarily about Sub-Saharan Africa in general.

The Kingdom of Aksum (designated as Ethiopia) dates back to centuries after the South Arabian Influence on Horn of Africa. Following these Hellenic and biblical traditions, the Monumentum Adulitanum, a 3rd-century inscription belonging to the Aksumite Empire, indicates that Aksum's ruler governed an area that was flanked to the west by the territory of Ethiopia and Sasu. The Aksumite King Ezana eventually conquered Nubia. In the following century, a Ge'ez version of the Ezana inscription, Aἰθίοπες is equated with the unvocalized Ḥbšt and Ḥbśt (Ḥabashat), and denotes for the first time the highland inhabitants of Aksum. This new demonym was subsequently rendered as ḥbs ('Aḥbāsh) in Sabaic and as Ḥabasha in Arabic.

In the 15th-century Ge'ez Book of Axum, the name is ascribed to a legendary individual called Ityopp'is. He was an extra-biblical son of Cush, son of Ham, said to have founded the city of Axum.

== Antiquity ==
=== Land of Punt ===
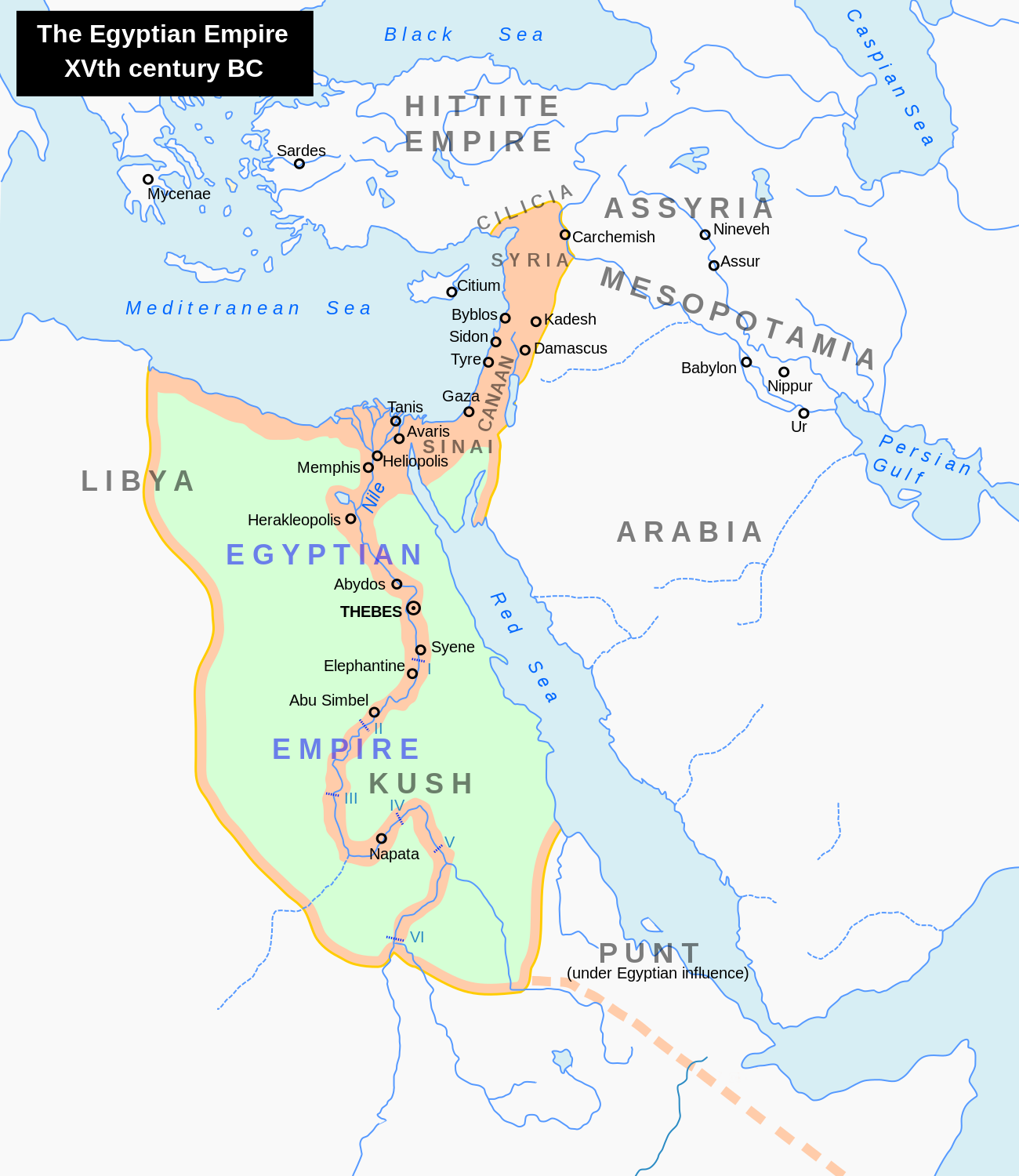
Location of the Land of Punt, in the influence of the Egyptians

It has been hypothesized that Punt was a kingdom in the Horn of Africa, based on stable isotope analysis of Egyptian mummified baboons suggesting they originated from an area encompassing modern-day Ethiopia, Eritrea, and Somalia. Egyptian traders from about 3000 BC refer to lands south of Nubia or Kush as Punt and Yam. The Ancient Egyptians had myrrh (found in Punt), which Richard Pankhurst interprets to indicate trade between the two countries was extant from Ancient Egypt's beginnings. Egyptian records indicate this possession of myrrh as early as the First and Second dynasties (3100–2888 BC), which was also a prized product of the Horn of Africa Region; inscriptions and pictorial reliefs also indicate ivory, panther and other animal skins, myrrh-trees and ostrich feathers from the African coastal belt; and in the Fourth Egyptian Dynasty (2789–2767 BC) a Puntite is mentioned to be in the service of the son of Cheops, the builder of the Great Pyramid. J. H. Breasted posited that this early trade relationship could have been realized through overland trade down the Nile and its tributaries (i.e. the Blue Nile and Atbara). The 2nd-century BC Greek historian and geographer Agatharchides had documented seafaring among the early Egyptians: "During the prosperous period of the Old Kingdom, between the 30th and 25th centuries BC, the river-routes were kept in order, and Egyptian ships sailed the Red Sea as far as the myrrh-country."

The first known voyage to Punt occurred in the 25th century BC under the reign of Pharaoh Sahure. The most famous expedition to Punt, however, comes during the reign of Queen Hatshepsut probably around 1495 BC, as the expedition was recorded in detailed reliefs on the temple of Deir el-Bahri at Thebes. The inscriptions depict a trading group bringing back myrrh trees, sacks of myrrh, elephant tusks, incense, gold, various fragmented wood, and exotic animals. Detailed information about these two nations is sparse, and there are many theories concerning their locations and the ethnic relationships of their peoples. The Egyptians sometimes called the Land of Punt, "God's-Land", due to the "large quantities of gold, ivory, and myrrh that could be easily obtained".

Evidence of Naqadan contacts include obsidian from Ethiopia and the Aegean. Though not much is known, Punt likely fell due to ethnic tensions between proto-Cushites and Habesha peoples, splitting to form two different kingdoms, Macrobia and D'mt at around the 1st millennium BC.

=== Pre-Aksumite/D'mt Civilization: The Mai Adrasha Site ===
Recent archaeological excavations in Mai Adrasha, located near Shire in Northern Ethiopia, have uncovered a significant early settlement that predates the Kingdom of Aksum and D'mt by centuries. Findings at this site date back to circa 1250 BC, making it one of the oldest known town in Sub-Saharan Africa. Mai Adrasha appears to have been a major center for metalworking, with evidence of large-scale slag deposits and remnants of substantial stone-walled buildings. The scale of the settlement suggests a high degree of social complexity and possibly long-distance trade connections with Arabia.

=== Dʿmt ===
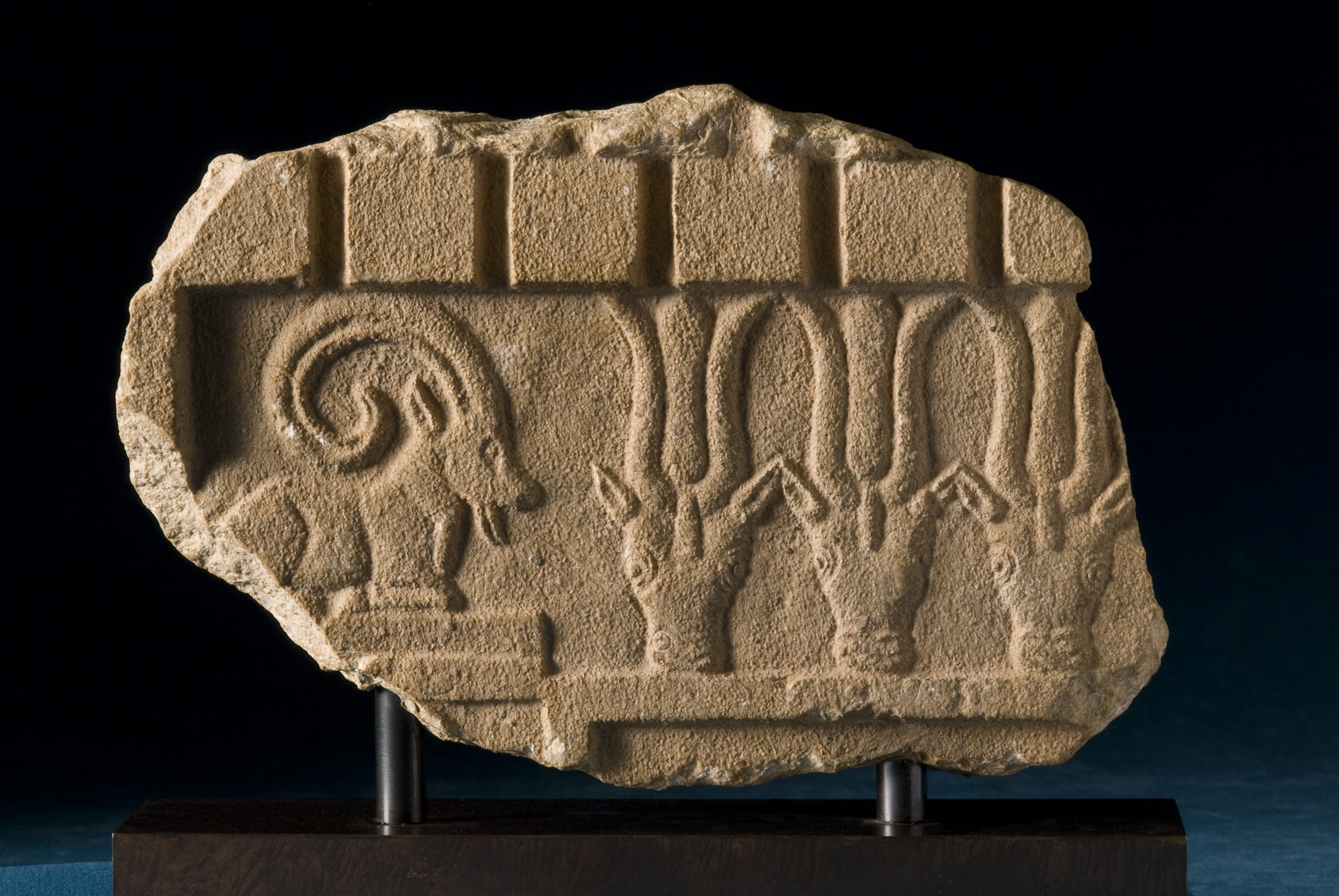
A stela with an ibex and three Arabian oryx, associated with Astar (ዐስተር), Semitic god of the Morning and Evening Star, found at Axum

Aside from Mai Adrasha, and Land of Punt, the first kingdom that is epigraphically known to have existed in Ethiopia was the kingdom of Dʿmt, which rose to power around the year 980 BC. Its capital was at Yeha, where a so-called Sabean style temple was built around 700 BC although no evidence of such architecture being found in Yemen. The D'mt kingdom was influenced by the Sabaeans in Yemen, however it is not known to what extent. While it's believed that D'mt was a Sabaean colony, it's believed that Sabaean influence was major, connected to a large localities, and disappeared after centuries, perhaps representing a trading or military colony in some sort of symbiosis or military alliance with the civilization of Dʿmt or some other proto-Aksumite state. Few inscriptions by or about this kingdom survive and very little archaeological work has taken place. As a result, it is not known whether Dʿmt ended as a civilization before Aksum's early stages, evolved into the Aksumite state, or was one of the smaller states united in the Aksumite kingdom possibly around the beginning of the 1st century.

=== Aksum ===
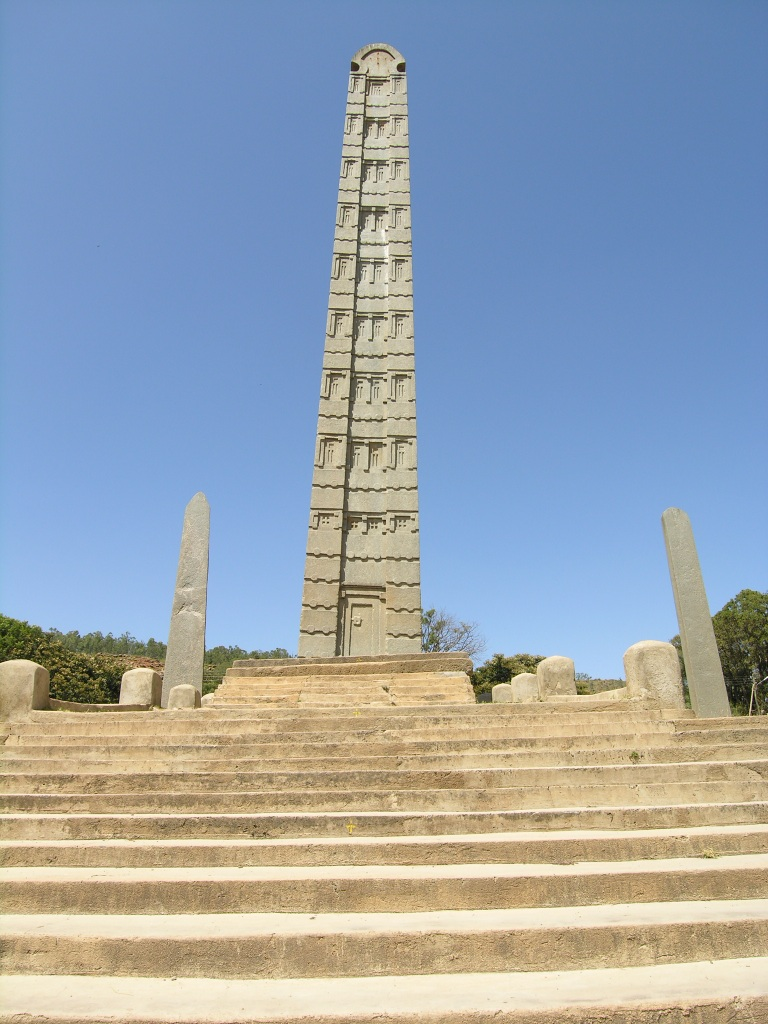
King Ezana's Stele in Aksum

The first verifiable great power to rise in Ethiopia was that of Axum in the 1st century AD. It was one of many successor kingdoms to Dʿmt and was able to unite the northern Ethiopian Highlands beginning around the 1st century BC. They established bases on the northern highlands of the Ethiopian Plateau and from there expanded southward. The Persian religious figure Mani listed Axum with Rome, Persia, and China as one of the four great powers of his time. The origins of the Axumite Kingdom are unclear, although experts have offered their speculations about it. Even who should be considered the earliest known king is contested: although Carlo Conti Rossini proposed that Zoskales of Axum, mentioned in the Periplus of the Erythraean Sea, should be identified with one Za Haqle mentioned in the Ethiopian King Lists (a view embraced by later historians of Ethiopia such as Yuri M. Kobishchanov and Sergew Hable Sellasie), G.W.B. Huntingford argued that Zoskales was only a sub-king whose authority was limited to Adulis, and that Conti Rossini's identification can not be substantiated.

Inscriptions have been found in southern Arabia celebrating victories over one GDRT, described as "nagashi of Habashat [i.e. Abyssinia] and of Axum." Other dated inscriptions were used to determine a floruit for GDRT (interpreted as representing a Ge'ez name such as Gadarat, Gedur, Gadurat or Gedara) around the beginning of the 3rd century CE. A bronze sceptre or wand has been discovered at Atsbi Dera with an inscription mentioning "GDR of Axum". Coins showing the royal portrait began to be minted under King Endybis toward the end of the 3rd century CE.

==== Christianity, Judaism and Islam ====
Christianity was introduced into the country by Frumentius, who was consecrated as the first bishop of Ethiopia by Saint Athanasius of Alexandria in about 330 CE. Frumentius converted Ezana, who left several inscriptions detailing his reign both before and after his conversion.

One inscription which was found at Axum states that Ezana conquered the nation of the Bogos, and returned thanks to his father, the god Mars, for his victory. Later inscriptions show Ezana's growing attachment to Christianity, and Ezana's coins bear this out, shifting from a design with a disc and crescent to a design with a cross. Expeditions by Ezana into the Kingdom of Kush at Meroe in Sudan may have brought about its demise, though there is evidence that the kingdom was experiencing a period of decline beforehand. As a result of Ezana's expansions, Aksum bordered the Roman province of Egypt. The degree of Ezana's control over Yemen is uncertain. Though there is little evidence supporting Aksumite control of the region at that time, his title, which includes King of Saba and Salhen, Himyar and Dhu-Raydan (all in modern-day Yemen), along with gold Aksumite coins with the inscriptions, "King of the Habshat" or "Habashite", indicate that Aksum might have retained some legal or actual footing in the area.

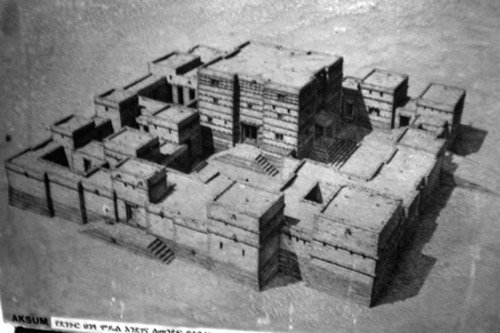
An Aksumite palace at Dungur

Toward the end of the 5th century CE, a group of monks known as the Nine Saints are believed to have established themselves in the country. They fueled the spread of Christianity in Ethiopia by establishing many churches such as Abuna Yemata Guh (also known as the Chapel in the Sky). Since then, monasticism has been a power among the people, and not without its influence on events.

Once again, the Axumite Kingdom is recorded as controlling part of West Yemen in the 6th century CE. Around 523 CE, the Himyarite king Dhu Nuwas came to power in Yemen and after he announced that he would kill all of the Christians, he attacked an Aksumite garrison at Zafar, burning the city's churches. He then attacked the Christian stronghold of Najran, slaughtering the Christians who would not convert to Judaism.

Emperor Justin I of the Eastern Roman Empire requested that his fellow Christian, Kaleb, help him in his fight against the Himyarite king. Around 525 CE, Kaleb invaded and defeated Dhu Nuwas, appointing his Christian follower Sumuafa' Ashawa' as his viceroy. This dating is tentative, however, as the basis of the year 525 CE for the invasion is based on the date of the death of the man who was the ruler of Yemen at that time, who very well could have been Kaleb's viceroy. Procopius records that after about five years, Aksum general Abraha deposed the viceroy and made himself king (Histories 1.20). Despite several attempted invasions across the Red Sea, Kaleb was unable to dislodge Abraha and acquiesced in the change; this was the last time Ethiopian armies left Africa until the 20th century when several units participated in the Korean War. Eventually, Kaleb abdicated in favour of his son Wa'zeb and retired to a monastery, where he ended his days. Abraha later made peace with Kaleb's successor and recognized his suzerainty. Despite this reverse, under Ezana and Kaleb the kingdom was at its height of glory, benefiting from their large trading economy, which extended as far as India and Ceylon, and were in constant communication with the Byzantine Empire.

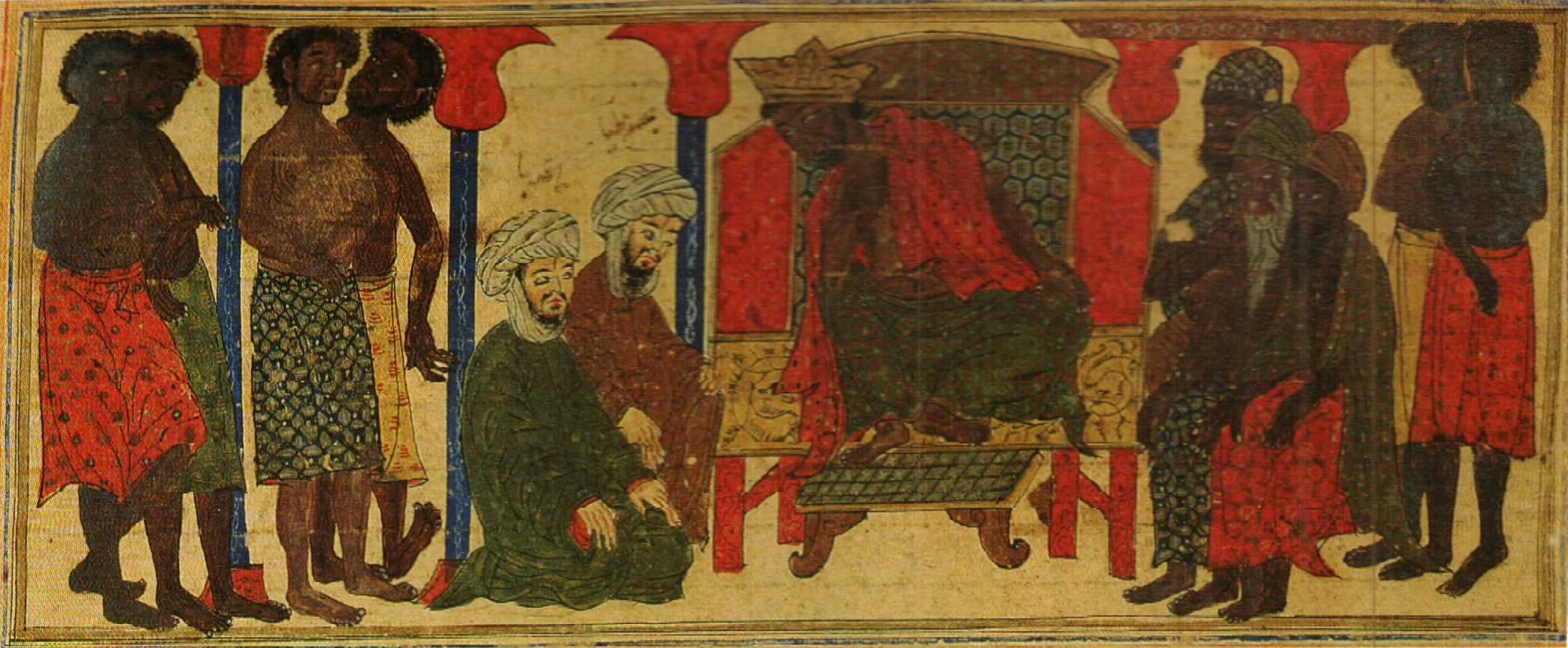
A 14th century Islamic depiction of the First Hijrah: The King of Aksum declines the Qurayshi request to send the Muslims back to Mecca

Details about the history of the Axumite Kingdom, never abundant, became scarcer after this point. The last king of Axum who is known to have minted coins was Armah, whose coinage refers to the Persian conquest of Jerusalem in 614. According to an early Muslim tradition, the Negus Sahama offered asylum to a group of Muslims who were fleeing from persecution during Muhammad's lifetime in 615, but Stuart Munro-Hay believes that Axum had been abandoned as the capital by that time – although Kobishchanov states that Ethiopian raiders plagued the Red Sea, preying on Arabian ports at least as late as 702.

Lacking a detailed history, the kingdom's fall has been attributed to a persistent drought, overgrazing, deforestation, a plague, a shift in trade routes that reduced the importance of the Red Sea—or a combination of all of these factors. Munro-Hay cites the Muslim historian Abu Ja'far al-Khwarazmi/Kharazmi (who wrote before 833) as stating that the capital of "the kingdom of Habash" was Jarma. Unless Jarma is a nickname for Axum (hypothetically from Ge'ez girma, "remarkable, revered"), the capital had moved from Axum to a new site, yet undiscovered.

== Middle Ages ==
=== Zagwe dynasty ===
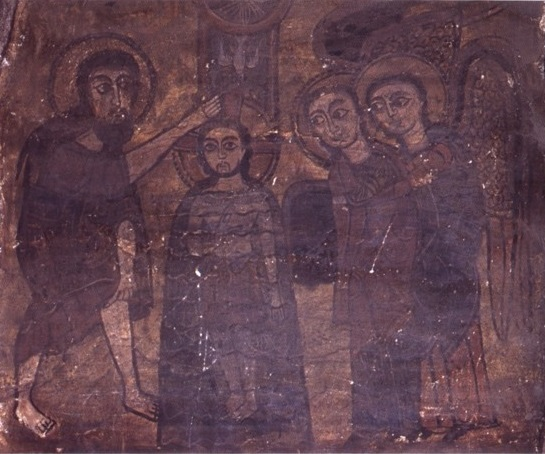
Baptism of Iyasu Christos, Yemrehana Kresos made in the Zagwe period

About 1000 (presumably c. 960, though the date is uncertain), a Jewish princess, Yodit (Judith) nicknamed "Gudit", conspired to murder all the members of the royal family and establish herself as monarch. According to legends, during the execution of the royals, an infant heir of the Axumite monarch was carted off by some faithful adherents and conveyed to Shewa, where his authority was acknowledged. Concurrently, Gudit reigned for forty years over the rest of the kingdom and transmitted the crown to her descendants. Though parts of this story were most likely made up by the Solomonic dynasty to legitimize its rule, it is known that a female ruler did conquer the country about this time.

At one point during the next century, the last of Yodit's successors were overthrown by an Agaw lord named Mara Takla Haymanot, who founded the Zagwe dynasty (named after the Agaw people who ruled during this time) and married a female descendant of the Aksumite monarchs ("son-in-law") or previous ruler. Exactly when the new dynasty came to power is unknown, as is the number of kings in the dynasty. The new Zagwe dynasty established its capital at Roha (also called Adefa), where they built a series of monolithic churches. These structures are traditionally ascribed to the King Gebre Mesqel Lalibela, with the city being renamed Lalibela in his honour; though in truth some of them were built before and after him. The architecture of the Zagwe shows a continuation of earlier Aksumite traditions, as can be seen at Lalibela and at Yemrehana Krestos Church. The building of rock-hewn churches, which first appeared in the late Aksumite era and continued into the Solomonic dynasty, reached its peak under the Zagwe.

The Zagwe dynasty controlled a smaller area than the Aksumites or the Solomonic dynasty, with its core in the Lasta region. The Zagwe seem to have ruled over a mostly peaceful state with a flourishing urban culture, in contrast to the more warlike Solomonids with their mobile capitals. David Buxton remarked that the Zagwe achieved 'a degree of stability and technical advancement seldom equalled in Abyssinian history'. The church and state were very closely linked, and they may have had a more theocratic society than the Aksumites or Solomonids, with three Zagwe kings being canonized as saints and one possibly being an ordained priest.

==== Foreign affairs ====
Unlike the Aksumites, the Zagwe were very isolated from the other Christian nations, although they did maintain a degree of contact through Jerusalem and Cairo. Like many other nations and denominations, the Ethiopian Church maintained a series of small chapels and even an annex at the Church of the Holy Sepulchre. Saladin, after retaking the Holy City in 1187, expressly invited the Ethiopian monks to return and even exempted Ethiopian pilgrims from the pilgrim tax. His two edicts provide evidence of Ethiopia's contact with these Crusader States during this period. It was during this period that the Ethiopian king Gebre Mesqel Lalibela ordered the construction of the legendary rock-hewn churches of Lalibela.

Later, as the Crusades were dying out in the early fourteenth century, the Ethiopian Emperor Wedem Arad dispatched a thirty-man mission to Europe, where they travelled to Rome to meet the Pope and then, since the Medieval Papacy was in schism, they travelled to Avignon to meet the Antipope. During this trip, the Ethiopian mission also travelled to France, Spain and Portugal in the hopes of building an alliance against the Muslim states then threatening Ethiopia's existence. Plans were even drawn up for a two-pronged invasion of Egypt with the French King, but nothing ever came of the talks, although this brought Ethiopia back to Europe's attention, leading to the expansion of European influence when the Portuguese explorers reached the Indian Ocean.

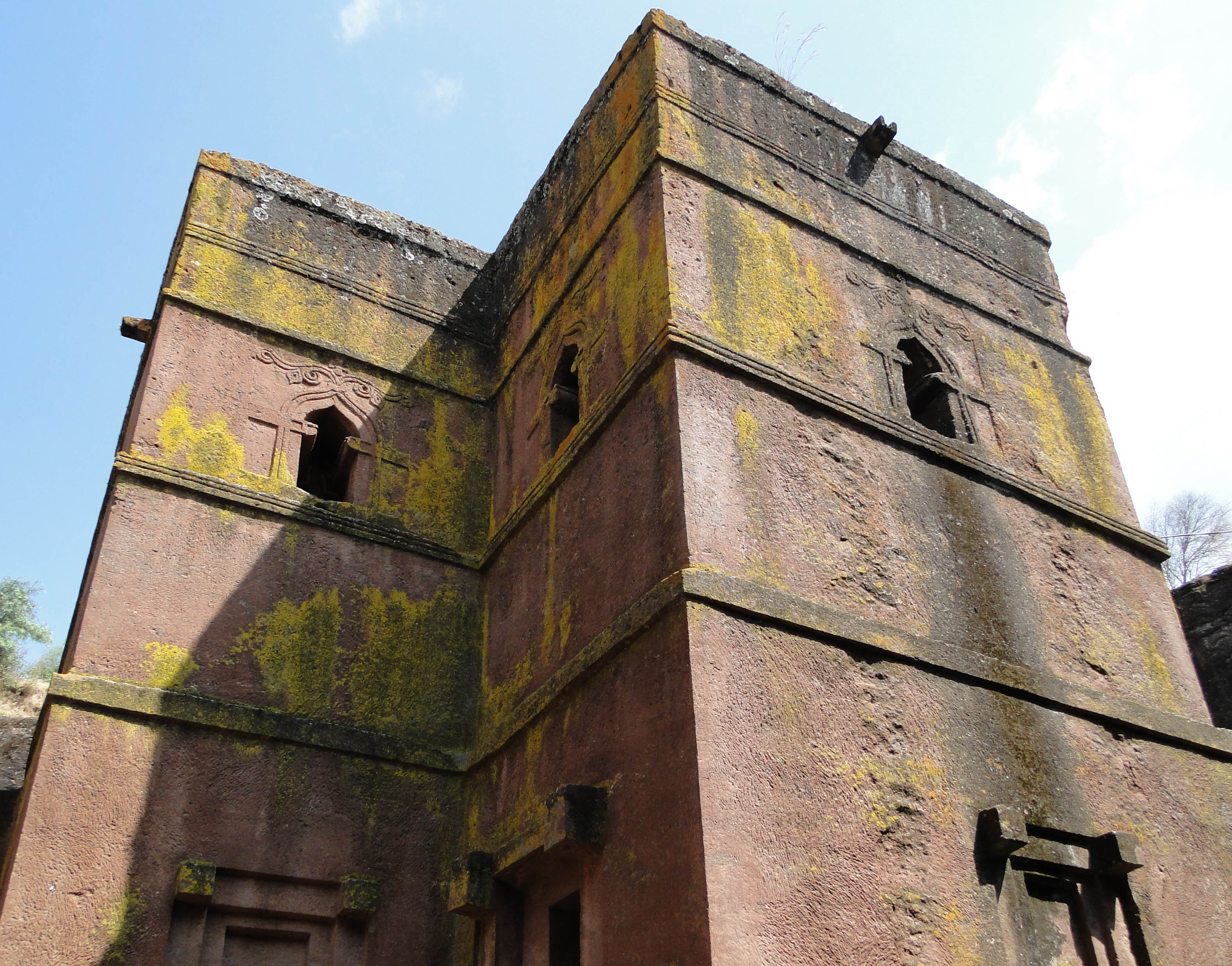
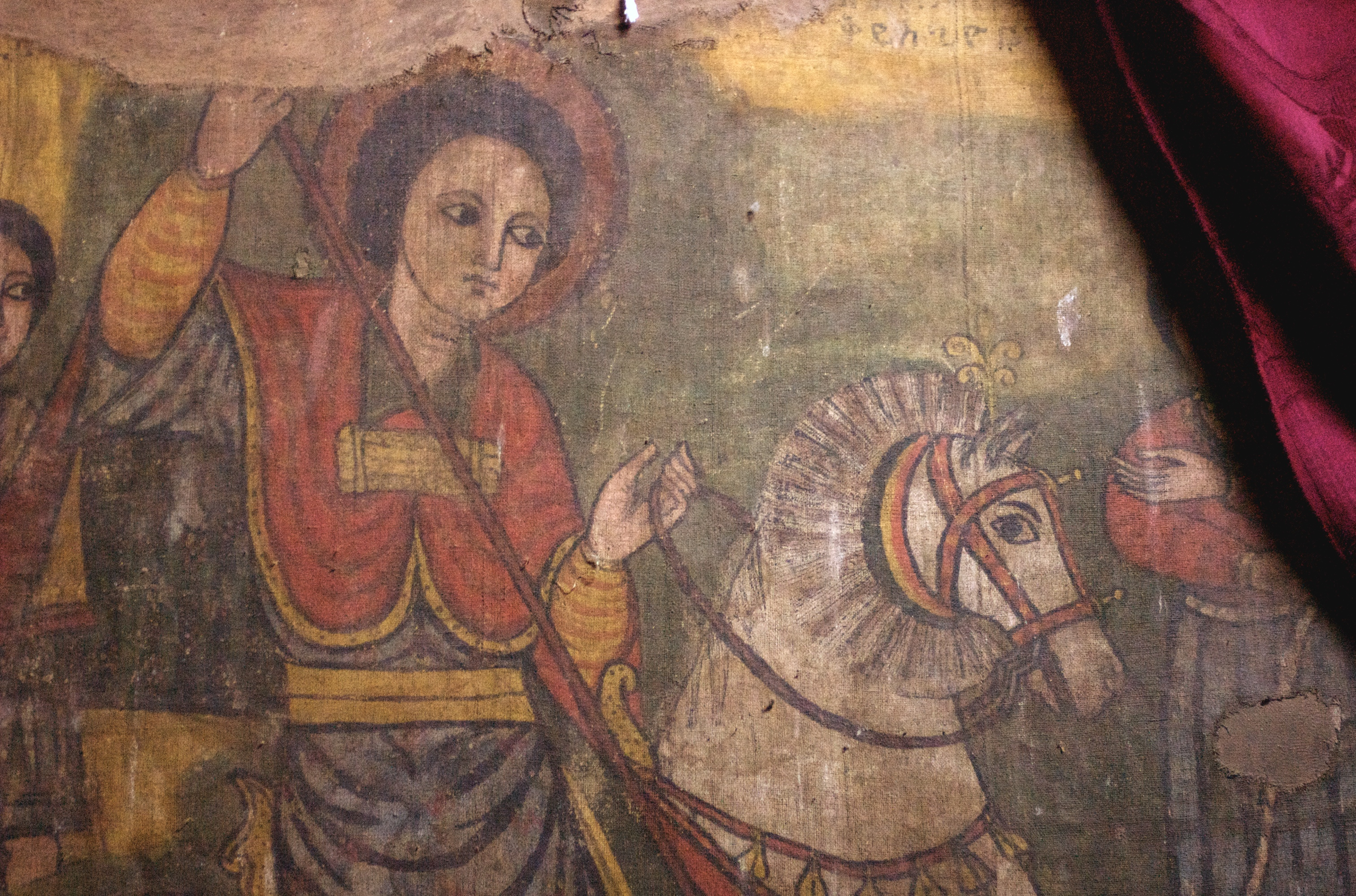
The Church of Saint George, Lalibela and a panel painting inside depicting Saint George slaying a dragon; it is one of eleven monumental rock-hewn churches built in Lalibela, Ethiopia that were allegedly sculpted after a vision by the Zagwe-dynasty ruler Gebre Mesqel Lalibela (r. 1185–1225 AD), in which St George instructed him to do so. The city of Lalibela was reestablished as a symbolic new holy site, following the fall of Jerusalem to the Muslim forces of Saladin in 1187 AD, yet archaeology reveals the religious structures to have been built between the 10th and early 12th centuries AD, with perhaps only the last phase carried out during the 13th century AD and reign of Gebre Mesqel Lalibela.

=== Early Solomonic period (1270–16th century) ===
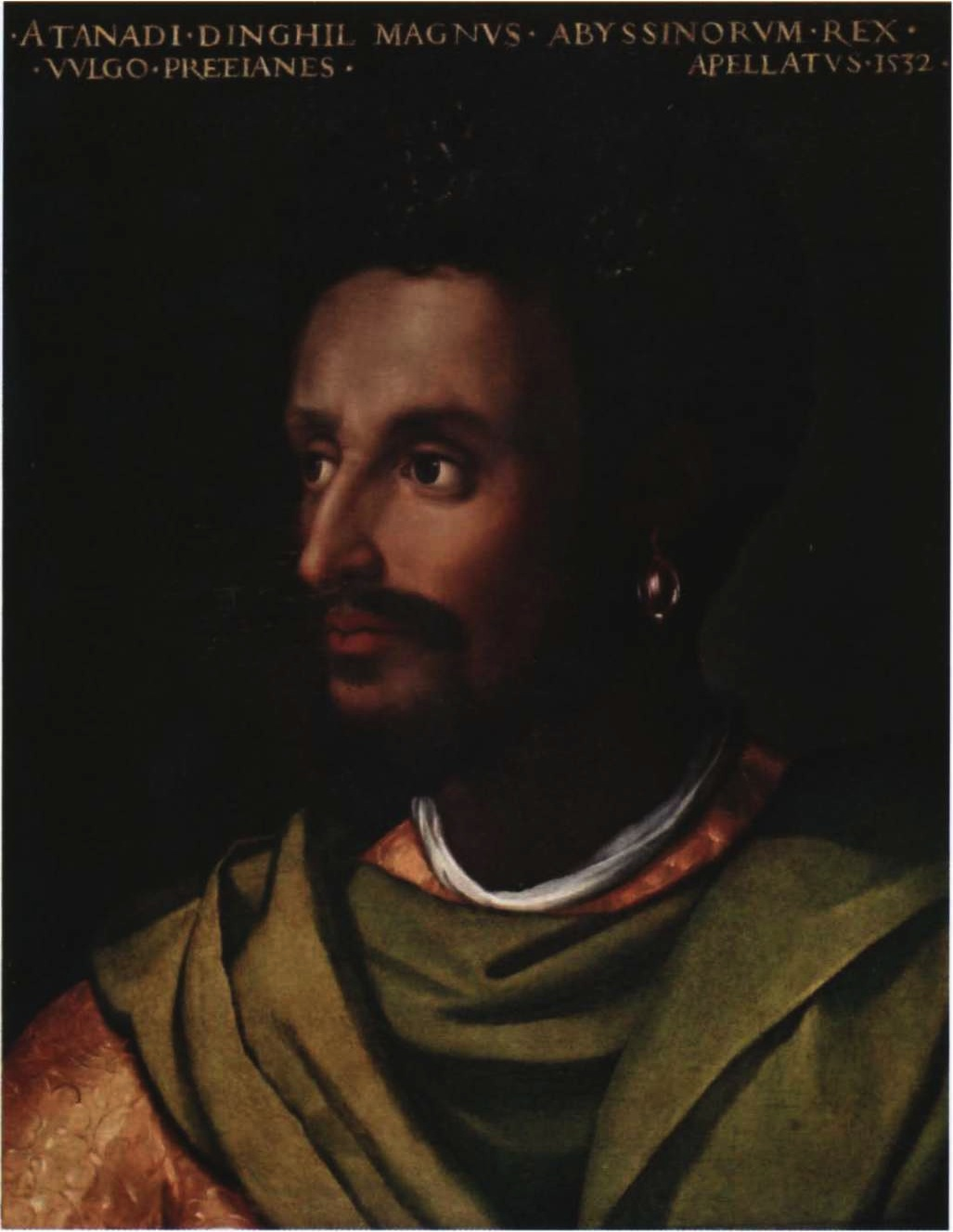
Lebna Dengel, nəgusä nägäst (Emperor) of Ethiopia and a member of the Solomonic dynasty.

Around 1270, a new dynasty was established in the Abyssinian highlands under Yekuno Amlak, with aid from neighbouring Makhzumi dynasty deposed the last of the Zagwe kings and married one of his daughters. According to legends, the new dynasty were male-line descendants of Aksumite monarchs, now recognized as the continuing Solomonic dynasty (the kingdom being thus restored to the biblical royal house). This legend was created to legitimize the Solomonic dynasty and was written down in the 14th century in the Kebra Negast, an account of the origins of the Solomonic dynasty. Under the Solomonic dynasty, the chief provinces became Tigray (northern), what is now Amhara (central) and Shewa (southern). The seat of government, or rather of overlordship, had usually been in Amhara or Shewa, the ruler of which, calling himself nəgusä nägäst, exacted tribute, when he could, from the other provinces. The title of nəgusä nägäst was to a considerable extent based on their alleged direct descent from Solomon and the queen of Sheba; but it is needless to say that in many, if not in most, cases their success was due more to the force of their arms than to the purity of their lineage. Under the early Solomonic dynasty Ethiopia engaged in military reforms and imperial expansion which left it dominating the Horn of Africa, especially under the rule of Amda Seyon I. There was also great artistic and literary advancement at this time, but also a decline in urbanisation as the Solomonic emperors didn't have any fixed capital, but rather moved around the empire in mobile camps. Under the early Solomonic dynasty monasticism grew strongly. The abbot Abba Ewostatewos created a new order called the Ewostathians who called for reforms in the church, including observance of the Sabbath but was persecuted for his views and eventually forced into exile, eventually dying in Armenia. His zealous followers, also persecuted, formed isolated communities in Tigray. The movement grew strong enough that the emperor Dawit I, after first trying to crush the movement, legalized their observance of the Sabbath and proselytization of their faith. Finally, under Zara Yaqob a compromise was made between the new Egyptian bishops and the Ewostathians at the Council of Mitmaq in 1450, restoring unity to the Ethiopian church.

In around 1380, Dawit I campaigned against Egypt, reaching as far north as Aswan. He initiated this campaign in an attempt to assist the Coptic Christians of Upper Egypt who he thought were being oppressed under Muslim rule and he felt he had the duty to protect them as he saw himself as the protector of Orthodox Christianity and the Copts in Egypt. In response, the Emir forced the Patriarch of Alexandria, Matthew I, to send a deputation to Dawit to persuade him to retire back to his kingdom. "There seems to be little or no doubt that, on the eve of the advent of the Burji dynasty of Mamluk Egypt, King Dawit had led his troops beyond the northern frontiers of his kingdom, and created much havoc among the Muslim inhabitants of the area who had been within the sphere of influence of Egypt since the thirteenth century." The Emperor had a much friendlier relationship with the Sultan's successor, for according to the medieval historian al-Maqrizi, Dawit sent 22 camels laden with gifts to Berkuk, the first Sultan of the Burji dynasty.

During his first years on the throne, Zara Yaqob launched a strong campaign against survivors of pagan worship and "un-Christian practices" within the church. Those who admitted to worshipping pagan gods were publicly decapitated. He also took measures to greatly centralize the administration of the country, bringing regions under much tighter imperial control. The Adal Sultanate would then conduct an invasion of the province of Dawaro. However, the Emperor successfully repelled this invasion in the Battle of Gomit in 1445. In 1456, Zara Yaqob founded Debre Berhan after witnessing a miraculous light in the sky, which he interpreted as divine approval for his persecution of pagans. He ordered the construction of a church on the site and established an extensive palace nearby, along with a second church dedicated to Saint Cyriacus.

=== Relations with Europe and "Prester John" ===
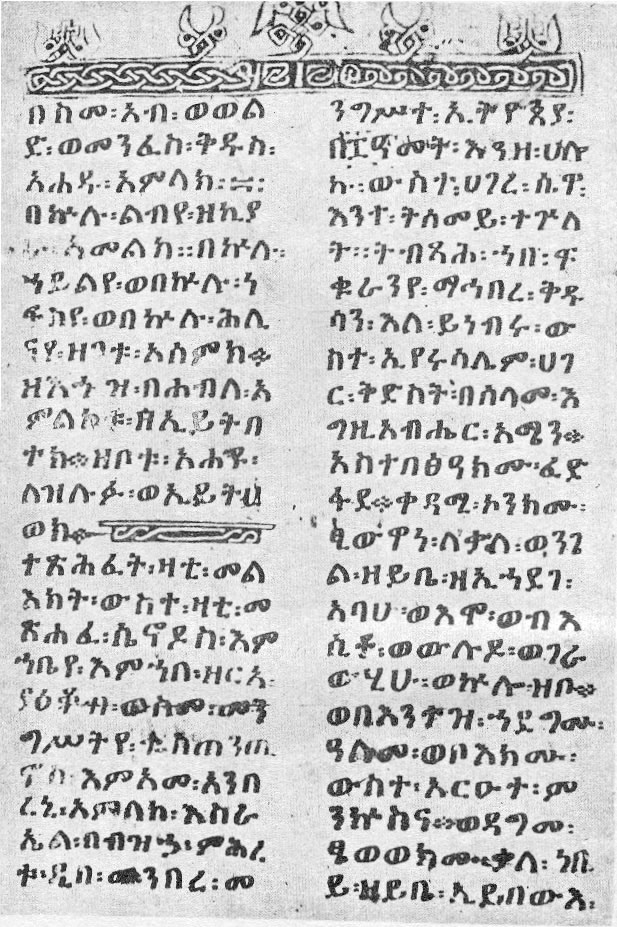
Zara Yacob's letter sent to the Pope Nicholas V at the Council of Florence

Yeshaq I made the earliest known contact from post-Axumite Ethiopia to a European ruler. He sent a letter by two dignitaries to Alfonso V of Aragon, which reached the king in 1428, proposing an alliance against the Muslims that would be sealed by a dual marriage, requiring Infante Peter, Viceroy of Sicily to bring a group of artisans to Ethiopia, where he would marry Yeshaq's daughter. It is not clear how or if Alfonso responded to this letter, although in a letter that reached Yeshaq's successor Zara Yaqob in 1450, Alfonso wrote that he would be happy to send artisans to Ethiopia if their safe arrival could be guaranteed, for on a previous occasion a party of thirteen of his subjects travelling to Ethiopia had all perished.

Zara Yaqob sent delegates to the Council of Florence in 1441 and established ties with the Holy See and Western Christianity. They were confused when council prelates insisted on calling their monarch "Prester John". They tried to explain that nowhere in Zara Yaqob's list of regnal names did that title occur. However, the delegates' admonitions did little to stop Europeans from referring to the monarch as their mythical Christian king, Prester John.

He also sent a diplomatic mission to Europe (1450), asking for skilled labour. The mission was led by a Sicilian, Pietro Rombulo, who had previously been successful in a mission to India. Rombulo first visited Pope Nicholas V, but his ultimate goal was the court of Alfonso V of Aragon, who responded favourably. Two letters for Ethiopians in the Holy Land (from Amda Seyon and Zara Yaqob) survive in the Vatican Library, referring to "the kings Ethiopia.

Towards the close of the 15th century, the Portuguese missions into Ethiopia began. Among others engaged in this search was Pêro da Covilhã, who arrived in Ethiopia in 1490, and, believing that he had at length reached the far-famed kingdom, presented to the nəgusä nägäst of the country (Eskender at the time) a letter from his master the king of Portugal, addressed to Prester John. Covilhã would establish positive relations between the two states and go on to remain there for many years. In 1509, Empress Dowager Eleni, the underage Emperor's regent, sent an Armenian named Matthew to the king of Portugal to request his aid against the Muslims. In 1520, the Portuguese fleet, with Matthew on board, entered the Red Sea in compliance with this request, and an embassy from the fleet visited the Emperor, Lebna Dengel, and remained in Ethiopia for about six years. One of these ambassadors was Father Francisco Álvares, who wrote one of the earliest European accounts of the country.

=== The Ethiopian-Adal War (1529–1543) ===
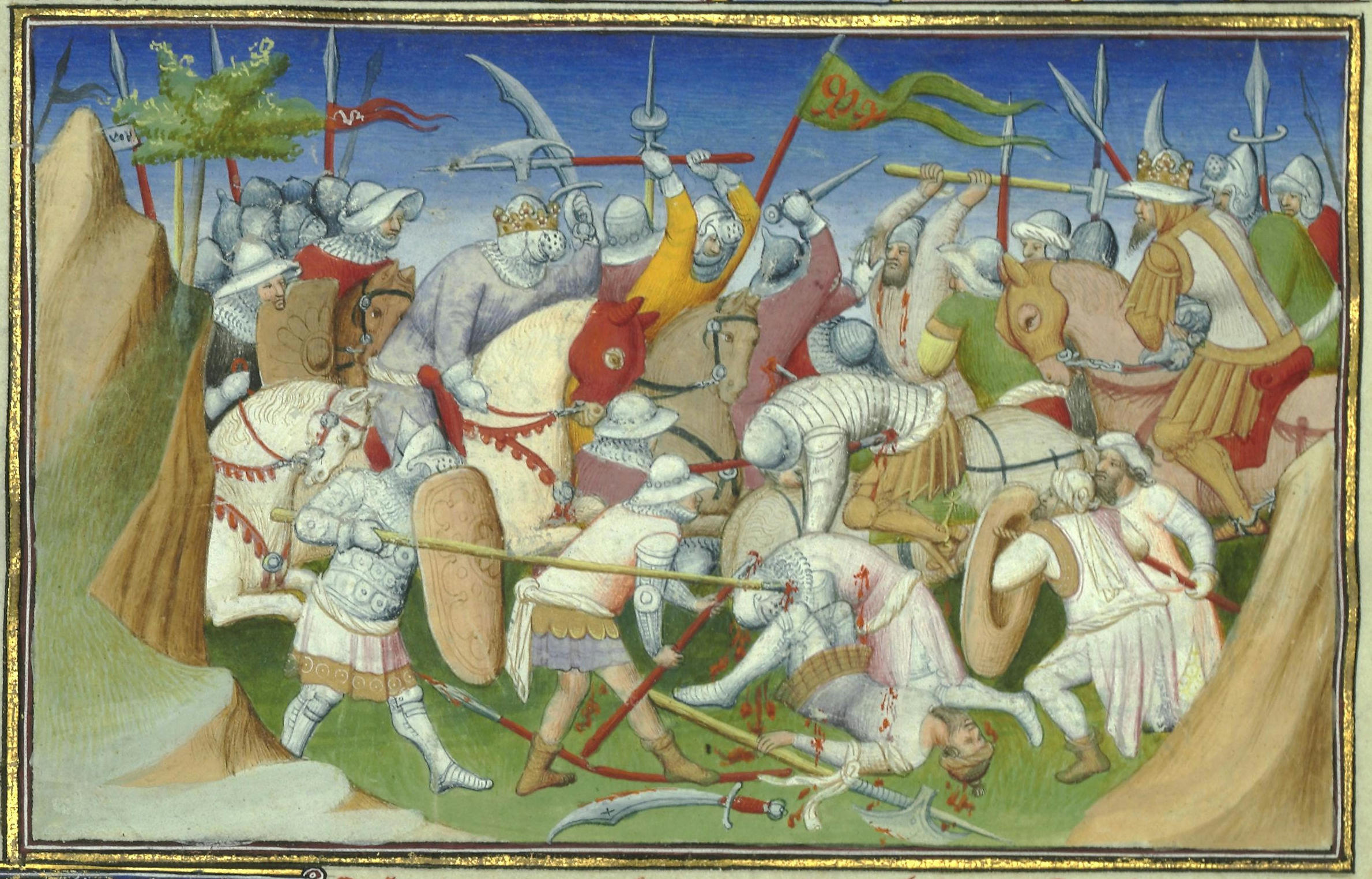
Anachronistic painting of the Sultan of Adal (right) and his troops battling Emperor Yagbe'u Seyon and his men

Between 1528 and 1540, the Adal Sultanate attempted, under Ahmad ibn Ibrihim al-Ghazi, to conquer the Ethiopian Empire. Entering, from the low arid country to the south-east on the pretext of a Jihad, encroached upon much of the Ethiopian plateau, forcing the Emperor to take refuge in the mountain fastnesses. In this remote location, the Empress turned to the Portuguese for military assistance against Ottoman guns. João Bermudes, a subordinate member of the mission of 1520, who had remained in the country after the departure of the embassy, was sent to Lisbon. Bermudes claimed to be the ordained successor to the Abuna (archbishop), but his credentials are disputed.

In response to Bermudes message, a Portuguese fleet under the command of Estêvão da Gama, was sent from India and arrived at Massawa in February 1541. Here he received an ambassador from the Empress beseeching him to send help against the Muslims, and in the July following a force of 400 musketeers, under the command of Cristóvão da Gama, younger brother of the admiral, marched into the interior at first were successful against the enemy; but subsequently defeated at the Battle of Wofla (28 August 1542), and their commander captured and executed. The 120 surviving Portuguese soldiers fled with Queen Mother Seble Wongel and regrouped with Ethiopian forces led by the Emperor to enact several defeats on the Adal over late 1542 and early 1543. On February 21, 1543, Al-Ghazi was shot and killed in the Battle of Wayna Daga and his forces were totally routed. After this, quarrels arose between the Emperor and Bermudes, who had returned to Ethiopia with Gama and now urged the emperor to publicly profess his obedience to Rome. This the Emperor refused to do, and at length, Bermudes was obliged to make his way out of the country.

=== Oromo Expansion ===
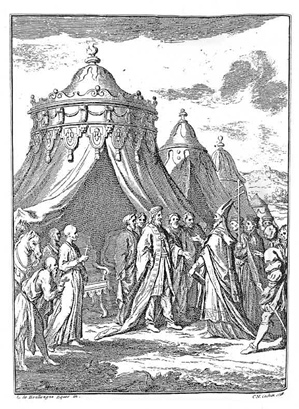
King Susenyos I receives the patriarch of the Latins.

The Oromo Invasions were a series of encroachments in the 16th and 17th centuries by the Oromo people from Southern Ethiopia to more northern regions. The migrations had a severe impact on the Solomonic dynasty of Abyssinia, as well as an impact on the recently weakened Adal Sultanate. The migrations concluded in around 1710 when the Oromo conquered the kingdom of Ennarea in the Gibe region.

In the 17th century, the Ethiopian emperor Susenyos I relied on Oromo support to gain power and married an Oromo woman. While initial relations between the Oromo and Amhara were cordial, conflict erupted after the emperor tried to convert the Oromo to Christianity. Many Oromo entered in emperor Susenyos' domain in response.

In the 17th and 18th centuries, much of the Oromo people gradually underwent conversion to Islam, especially around Harar, modern Arsi and modern Bale. The Oromo Muslims regarded the Imam of Harar as their spiritual guide while retaining some of their original culture and socio-political organisation. Scholars believe the Oromo converted to Islam as a means of preserving their identity and a bulwark against assimilation into Ethiopia.

The Oromo also formed political coalitions with previously subdued people of Ethiopia, including the Sidama people and the locals of Ennarea, Gibe and Kingdom of Damot.

== Early modern period ==
=== Gondarine period (1632–1769) ===
A copy of 17th century philosophical and ethical treatise by Ethiopian philosopher Zara Yaqob

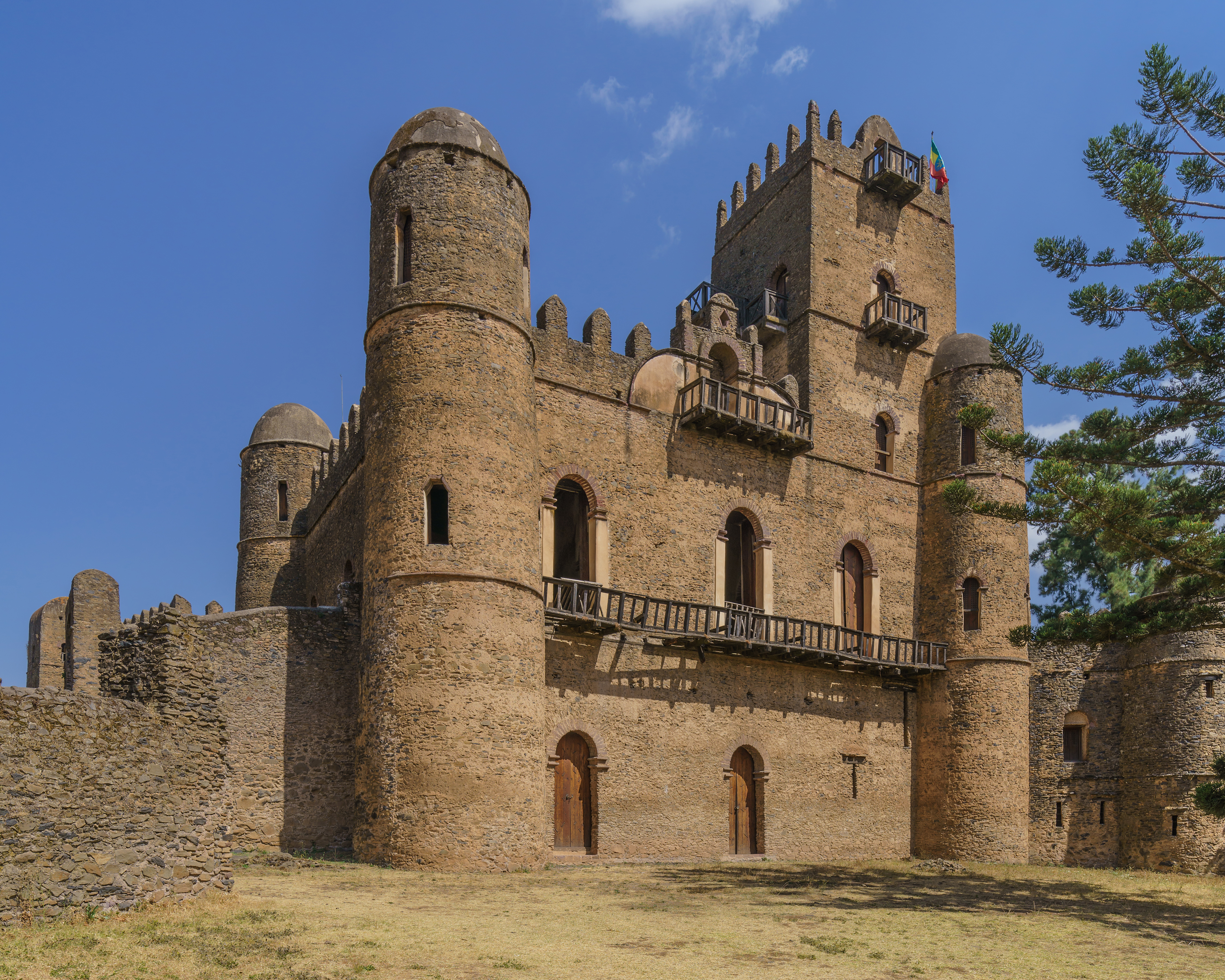
Fasil Ghebbi, one of the royal enclosure's of Gondar.

Gondar as a third long-term capital (after Aksum and Lalibela) of the Christian Kingdom was founded by Emperor Fasilides in 1636. It was the most important centre of commerce for the Empire.

The Jesuits who had accompanied or followed the Gama expedition into Ethiopia, and fixed their headquarters at Fremona (near Adwa), were oppressed and neglected, but not expelled. At the beginning of the 17th century, Father Pedro Páez arrived at Fremona, a man of great tact and judgment, who soon rose into high favour at court, and won over the emperor to his faith. He directed the erection of churches, palaces and bridges in different parts of the country, and carried out many useful works. His successor Afonso Mendes was less tactful and excited the feelings of the people against him and his fellow Europeans. Upon the death of Emperor Susenyos and accession of his son Fasilides in 1633, the Jesuits were expelled and the native religion restored to official status. Fasilides made Gondar his capital and built a castle there which would grow into the castle complex known as the Fasil Ghebbi, or Royal Enclosure. Fasilides also constructed several churches in Gondar, many bridges across the country, and expanded the Church of Our Lady Mary of Zion in Aksum.

During this time of religious strife Ethiopian philosophy flourished, and it was during this period that the philosophers Zera Yacob and Walda Heywat lived. Zera Yaqob is known for his treatise on religion, morality, and reason, known as Hatata.

Gondarine art drew on the Byzantine world's religious motifs, with elements including illuminated manuscripts, murals, and icons from diptych and triptychs. Diptych painting by the author Walda Mariam also contributed to the Egyptian Monastery of Saint Anthony murals. The diptych painting of the Passion of Christ in Qaha Iyasus exemplifies a desire for visual imagery in Ethiopian art. Gondarine art was also influenced by Western Baroque and Renaissance paintings through prints brought by the Jesuits in the 16th or 17th century.

The rebellion of the Agaw population in Lasta endured the reformation. Fasilides conducted punitive expeditions to Lasta and successfully suppressed it, which was described by the Scottish traveller James Bruce, "almost the whole army perished amidst the mountains; great part from famine, but a greater still from cold, a very remarkable circumstance in these latitudes." Fasilides tried to establish firm relations with Yemeni Imam Al-Mutawakkil Isma'il between 1642 and 1647 to discuss a trade route through Ottoman-held Massawa, which was unsuccessful.

=== Aussa Sultanate ===
The Sultanate of Aussa (Afar Sultanate) succeeded the earlier Imamate of Aussa. The latter polity had come into existence in 1577, when Muhammed Gasa moved his capital from Harar to Aussa with the split of the Adal Sultanate into Aussa and the Harari city-state. At some point after 1672, Aussa declined and temporarily came to an end in conjunction with Imam Umar Din bin Adam's recorded ascension to the throne.

The Sultanate was subsequently re-established by Kedafu around the year 1734, and was thereafter ruled by his Mudaito dynasty. The primary symbol of the Sultan was a silver baton, which was considered to have magical properties.

=== Zemene Mesafint ===
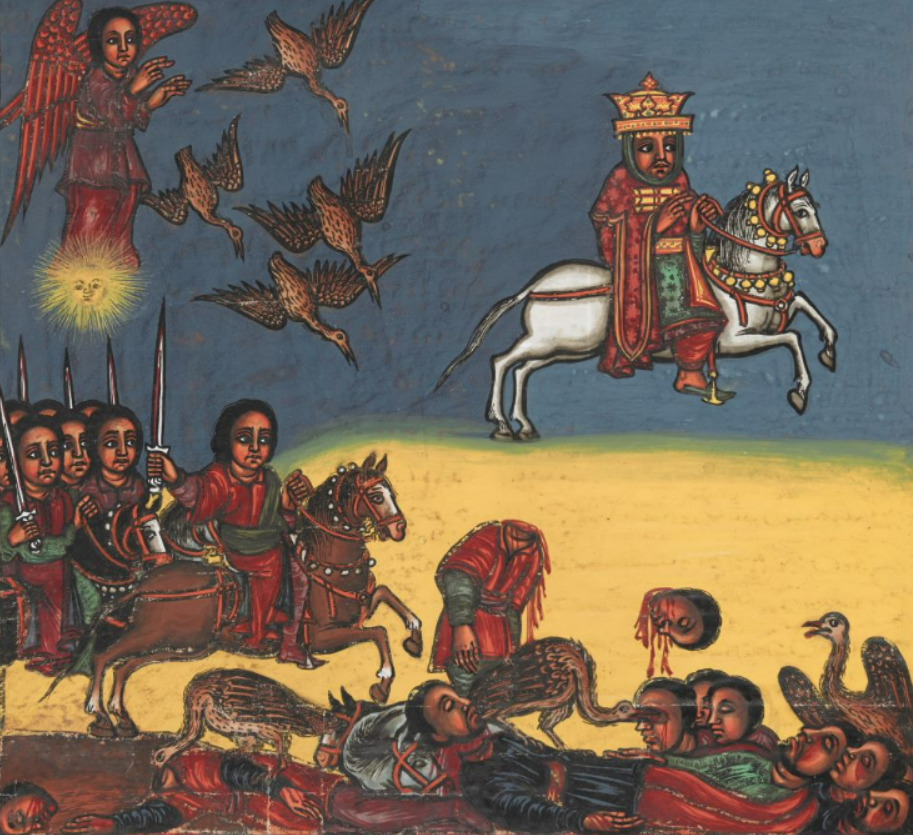
Gondarine nobility battle with regional overlords, feeding wounded soldiers to Hyenas and Vultures as common punishment for rebellious actions

This era was, on one hand, a religious conflict between settling Muslims and traditional Christians, between the nationalities they represented, and, on the other hand, between feudal lords in power over the central government.

Some historians date the murder of Iyasu I, and the resultant decline in the prestige of the dynasty, as the beginning of the Ethiopian Zemene Mesafint ("Era of the Princes"), a time of disorder when the power of the monarchy was eclipsed by the power of local warlords.

Nobles came to abuse their positions by making emperors, and encroached upon the succession of the dynasty, by candidates among the nobility itself: e.g. on the death of Emperor Tewoflos, the chief nobles of Ethiopia feared that the cycle of vengeance that had characterized the reigns of Tewoflos and Tekle Haymanot I would continue if a member of the Solomonic dynasty were picked for the throne, so they selected one of their own, Yostos to be negus nagast (king of kings) – however his tenure was brief.

Iyasu II ascended the throne as a child. His mother, Empress Mentewab played a major role in Iyasu's reign, as well as her grandson Iyoas. Mentewab had herself crowned as co-ruler, becoming the first woman to be crowned in this manner in Ethiopian history.

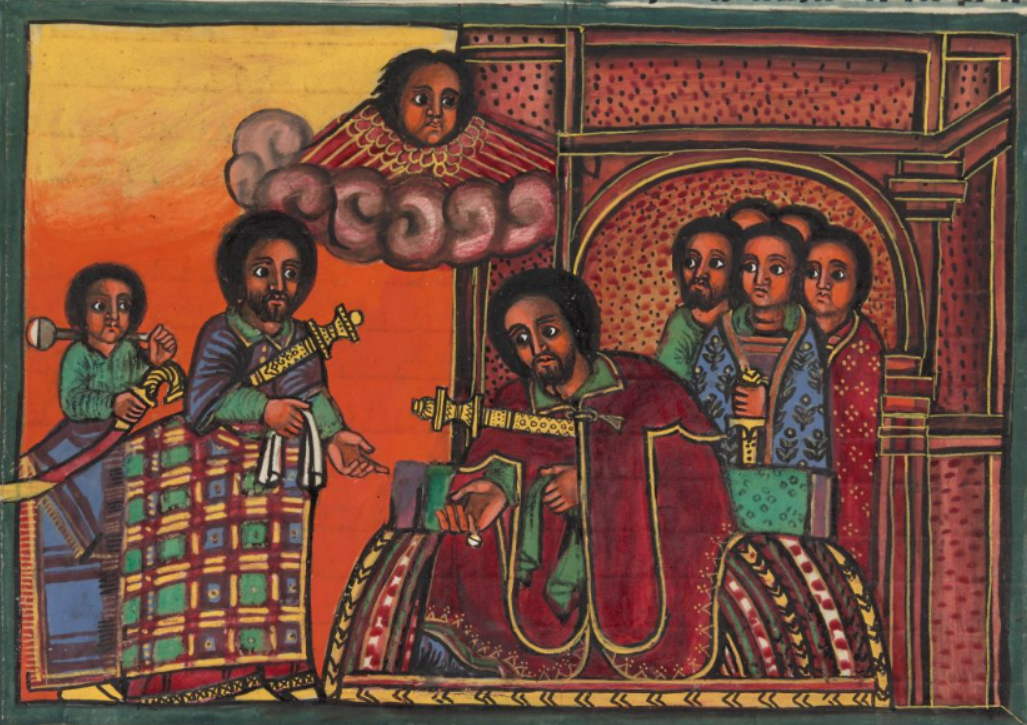
Ethiopian Prince investiture during the Zemene Mesafint

Empress Mentewab was crowned co-ruler upon the succession of her son (a first for a woman in Ethiopia) in 1730 and held unprecedented power over government during his reign. Her attempt to continue in this role following the death of her son in 1755 led her into conflict with Wubit (Welete Bersabe), his widow, who believed that it was her turn to preside at the court of her son Iyoas. The conflict between these two queens led to Mentewab summoning her Kwaran relatives and their forces to Gondar to support her. Wubit responded by summoning her own Oromo relatives and their considerable forces from Yejju.

The treasury of the Empire being allegedly penniless on the death of Iyasu, it suffered further from ethnic conflict between nationalities that had been part of the Empire for hundreds of years—the Amhara, Agaw, and Tigreans. Mentewab's attempt to strengthen ties between the monarchy and the Oromo by arranging the marriage of her son to the daughter of an Oromo chieftain backfired in the long run. Iyasu II gave precedence to his mother and allowed her every prerogative as a crowned co-ruler, while his wife Wubit suffered in obscurity. Wubit waited for the accession of her son to make a bid for the power wielded for so long by Mentewab and her relatives from Qwara. When Iyoas assumed the throne upon his father's sudden death, the aristocrats of Gondar were stunned to find that he more readily spoke in the Oromo language rather than in Amharic, and tended to favour his mother's Yejju relatives over the Qwarans of his grandmothers family. Iyoas further increased the favour given to the Oromo when adults. On the death of the Ras of Amhara, he attempted to promote his uncle Lubo governor of that province, but the outcry led his advisor Wolde Leul to convince him to change his mind.

It is believed that the power struggle between the Qwarans led by Empress Mentewab, and the Yejju Oromos led by the Emperor's mother Wubit was about to erupt into an armed conflict. Ras Mikael Sehul was summoned to mediate between the two camps. He arrived and shrewdly maneuvered to sideline the two queens and their supporters making a bid for power for himself. Mikael settled soon as the leader of the Amharic-Tigrean (Christian) camp of the struggle.

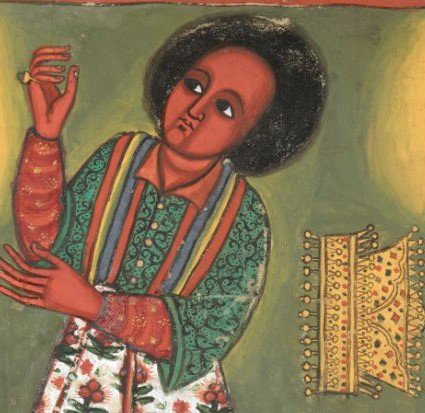
The murder of Iyoas I, perpetrated by Mikael Sehul, marked the start of the Zemene Mesafint

The reign of Iyaos' reign becomes a narrative of the struggle between the powerful Ras Mikael Sehul and the Oromo relatives of Iyoas. As Iyoas increasingly favoured Oromo leaders like Fasil, his relations with Mikael Sehul deteriorated. Eventually, Mikael Sehul deposed the Emperor Iyoas (7 May 1769). One week later, Mikael Sehul had him killed; although the details of his death are contradictory, the result was clear: for the first time an Emperor had lost his throne by a means other than his natural death, death in battle, or voluntary abdication.

Mikael Sehul had compromised the power of the Emperor, and from this point forward it lay ever more openly in the hands of the great nobles and military commanders. This point in time has been regarded as the start of the Era of the Princes.

An aged and infirm imperial uncle prince was enthroned as Emperor Yohannes II. Ras Mikael soon had him murdered, and underage Tekle Haymanot II was elevated to the throne.

This bitter religious conflict contributed to hostility toward foreign Christians and Europeans, which persisted into the 20th century and was a factor in Ethiopia's isolation until the mid-19th century, when the first British mission, sent in 1805 to conclude an alliance with Ethiopia and obtain a port on the Red Sea in case France conquered Egypt. The success of this mission opened Ethiopia to many more travellers, missionaries and merchants of all countries, and the stream of Europeans continued until well into Tewodros's reign.

== Modern era ==
Under the Emperors Tewodros II (1855–1868), Yohannes IV (1872–1889), and Menelik II (1889–1913), the empire began to emerge from its isolation. Under Emperor Tewodros II, the "Age of the Princes" (Zemene Mesafint) was brought to an end.

=== Tewodros II and Tekle Giyorgis II (1855–1872) ===
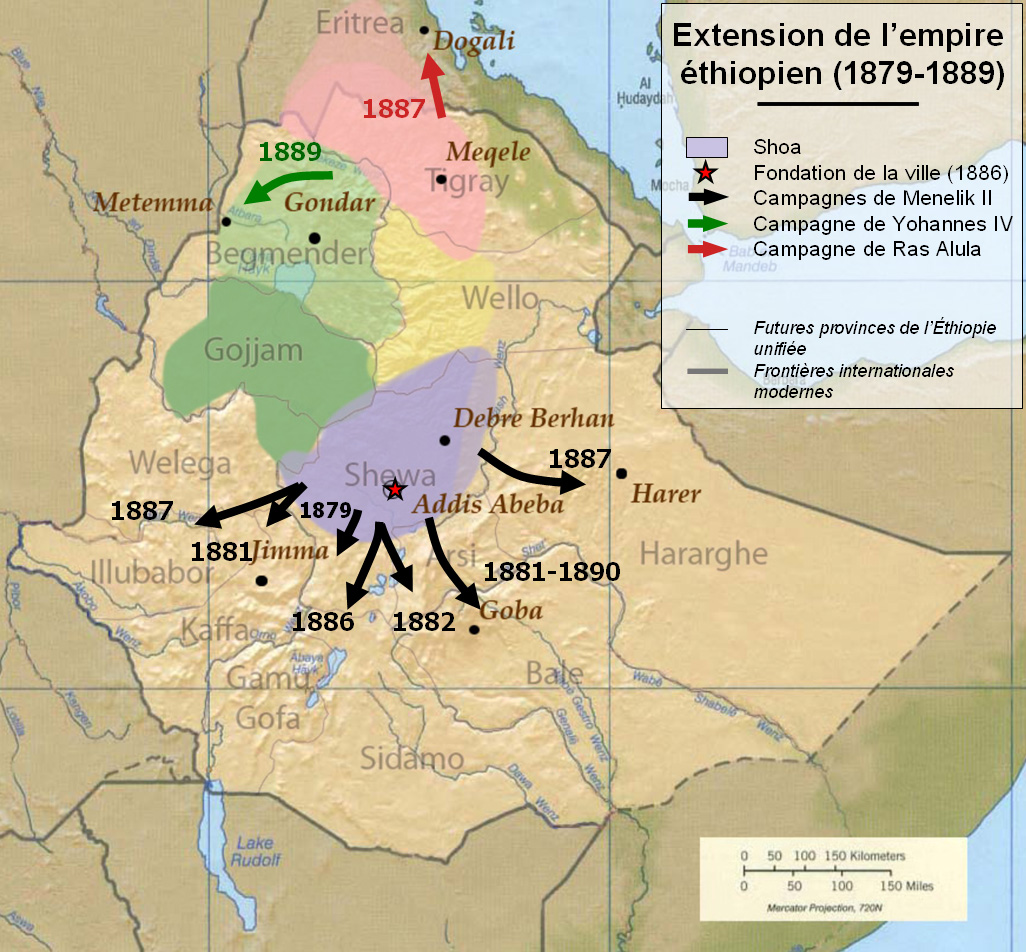
The conquests of Emperor Yohannes IV, Negus Menelik II and general Ras Alula in 1879–1889

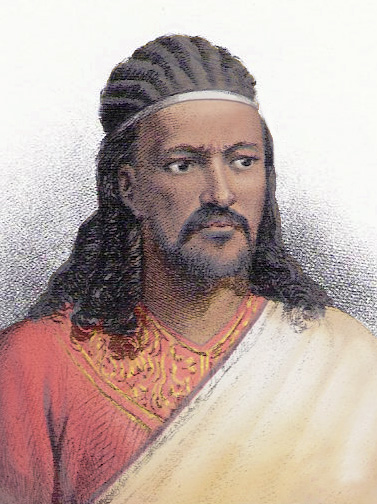
Emperor Tewodros II

Emperor Tewodros (or Theodore) II was born Lij Kassa in Qwara, in 1818. His father was a small local chief, and his relative (possibly uncle) Dejazmach Kinfu was governor of the provinces of Dembiya, Qwara and Chelga between Lake Tana and the northwestern frontier. Kassa lost his inheritance upon the death of Kinfu while he was still a young boy. After receiving a traditional education in a local monastery, he went off to lead a band of bandits that roved the country in a Robin Hood-like existence. His exploits became widely known, and his band of followers grew steadily until he led a formidable army. He came to the notice of the ruling Regent, Ras Ali, and his mother Empress Menen Liben Amede (wife of the Emperor Yohannes III). To bind him to them, the Empress arranged for Kassa to marry Ali's daughter. He turned his attention to conquering the remaining chief divisions of the country, Gojjam, Tigray and Shewa, which remained unsubdued. His relations with his father-in-law and grandmother-in-law deteriorated, however, and he soon took up arms against them and their vassals and was successful. On February 11, 1855, Kassa deposed the last of the Gondarine puppet Emperors and was crowned negusa nagast of Ethiopia under the name of Tewodros II. He soon after advanced against Shewa with a large army. Chief of the notables opposing him was its king Haile Melekot, a descendant of Meridazmach Asfa Wossen. Dissensions broke out among the Shewans, and after a desperate and futile attack on Tewodros at Dabra Berhan, Haile Melekot died of illness, nominating with his last breath his eleven-year-old son as successor (November 1855) under the name Negus Sahle Maryam (the future emperor Menelek II). Darge, Haile Melekot's brother, and Ato Bezabih, a Shewan noble, took charge of the young prince, but after a hard fight with Angeda, the Shewans were obliged to capitulate. Sahle Maryam was handed over to Emperor Tewodoros and taken to Gondar. He was trained there in Tewodros's service and then placed in comfortable detention at the fortress of Magdala. Tewodoros afterwards devoted himself to modernizing and centralizing the legal and administrative structure of his kingdom, against the resistance of his governors. Sahle Maryam of Shewa was married to Tewodros II's daughter Alitash.

In 1865, Sahle Maryam escaped from Magdala, abandoning his wife, and arrived in Shewa, and was there acclaimed as Negus. Tewodros allied with Britain and Ethiopia, but as explained in the next section, he committed suicide after a military defeat by the British. On the death of Tewodros, many Shewans, including Ras Darge, were released, and the young Negus of Shewa began to feel strong enough, after a few preliminary minor campaigns, to undertake offensive operations against the northern princes. However, these projects were of little avail, for Ras Kassai of Tigray had by this time (1872) risen to supreme power in the north. Proclaiming himself negus nagast under the name of Yohannes IV (or John IV), he forced Sahle Maryam to acknowledge his overlordship.

In early 1868, the British force seeking Tewodros' surrender, after he refused to release imprisoned British subjects, arrived on the coast of Massawa. The British and Dajazmach Kassa came to an agreement in which Kassa would let the British pass through Tigray (the British were going to Magdala which Tewodros had made his capital) in exchange for money and weapons. Surely enough, when the British completed their mission and were leaving the country, they rewarded Kassa for his cooperation with artillery, muskets, rifles, and munitions, all in all, worth approximately £500,000. This formidable gift came in handy when in July 1871 the current emperor, Emperor Tekle Giyorgis II, attacked Kassa at his capital in Adwa, for Kassa had refused to be named a ras or pay tribute. Although Kassa's army was outnumbered 12,000 to the emperor's 60,000, Kassa's army was equipped with more modern weapons and better trained. At battle's end, forty per cent of the emperor's men had been captured. The emperor was imprisoned and would die a year later. Six months later on 21 January 1872, Kassa became the new emperor under the name Yohannes IV.

=== Yohannes IV (1872–1889) ===
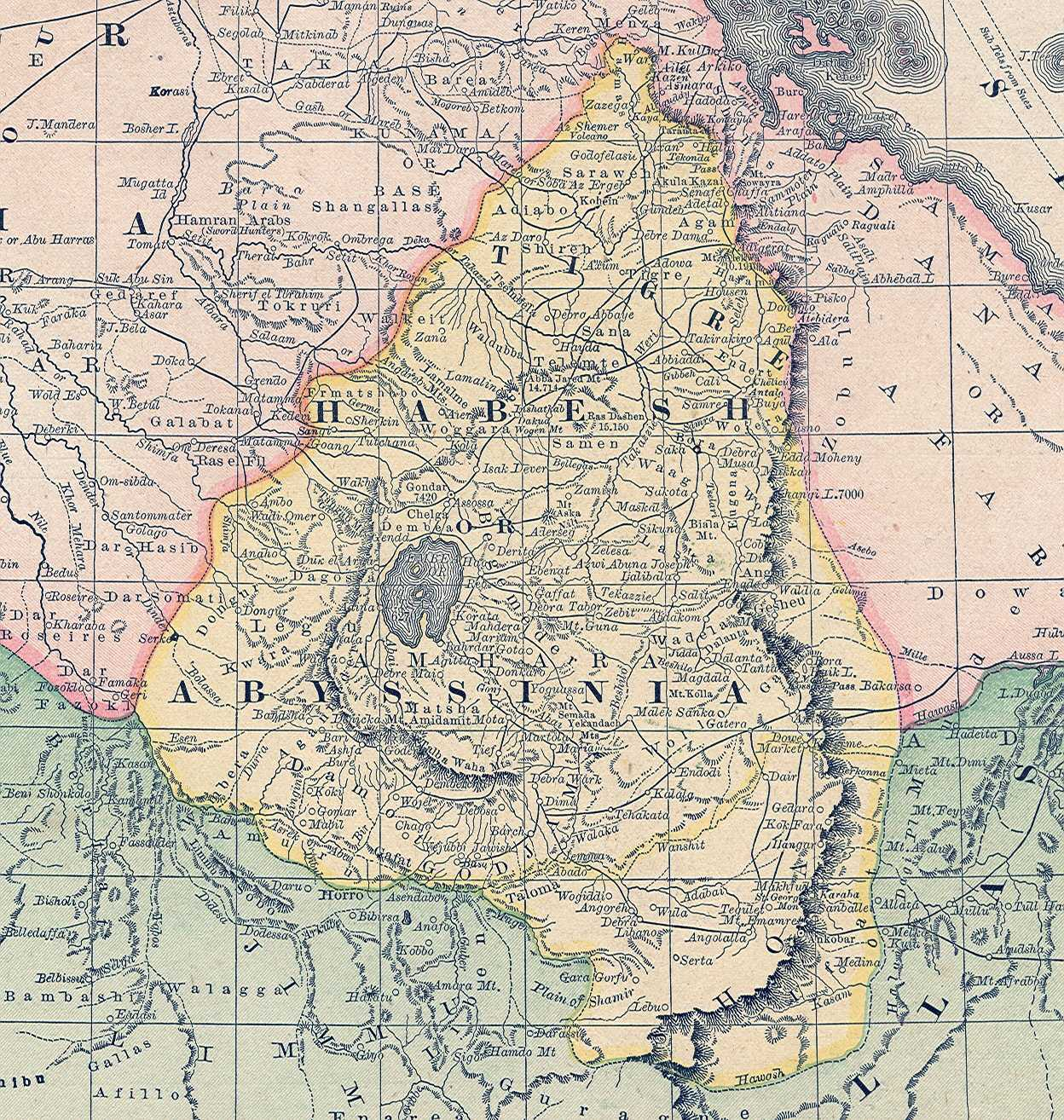
Map of Abyssinia (Ethiopia) in the 19th century.

Ethiopia was never colonized by a European power, however it was briefly military occupied by Italy in 1936 (see below); however, several colonial powers had interests and designs on Ethiopia in the context of the 19th-century "Scramble for Africa."

When Victoria, Queen of the United Kingdom, in 1867 failed to answer a letter Tewodros II of Ethiopia had sent her, he took it as an insult and imprisoned several British residents, including the consul. An army of 12,000 was sent from Bombay to Ethiopia to rescue the captured nationals, under the command of Sir Robert Napier. The dwindled army of Tewodros fought on bravely at the Battle of Magdala against the British force which was larger and better armed. The British stormed the fortress of Magdala (now known as Amba Mariam) on April 13, 1868. When the Emperor heard that the gate had fallen, he fired a pistol into his mouth and killed himself, rather than face defeat. Sir Robert Napier was raised to the peerage, and given the title of Lord Napier of Magdala.

A Red Sea port called Asseb was purchased from the local sultan in March 1870 by Rubattino Shipping Company, an Italian company. The company continued acquiring more land in 1879 and 1880 and was eventually bought out by the Italian government on July 5, 1882. Count Pietro Antonelli was dispatched the same year to Shewa to improve the prospects of the colony by forging treaties with the King of Shewa, Sahle Maryam.

In 1887 Menelik king of Shewa invaded the Emirate of Harar after his victory at the Battle of Chelenqo.

In April 1888 the Italian forces, numbering over 20,000 men, came in contact with the Ethiopian army, but negotiations took the place of fighting, with the result that both forces retired, the Italians only leaving some 5,000 troops in Eritrea, later to become an Italian colony.

Meanwhile, Emperor Yohannes IV had been engaged with the dervishes, who had in the meantime become masters of the Egyptian Sudan, and in 1887 a great battle ensued at Gallabat, in which the dervishes, under Zeki Tumal, were beaten. But a stray bullet struck the king, and the Ethiopians decided to retire. The king died during the night, and his body fell into the hands of the enemy (March 9, 1889). When the news of Yohannes's death reached Sahle Maryam of Shewa, he proclaimed himself emperor Menelik II of Ethiopia, and received the submission of Begemder, Gojjam, the Yejju Oromo, and Tigray.

=== Menelik II (1889–1913) ===
On May 2 of that same year, Emperor Menelik signed the Treaty of Wuchale with the Italians, granting them a portion of Northern Ethiopia, the area that would later be Eritrea and part of the province of Tigray in return for the promise of 30,000 rifles, ammunition, and cannons. The Italians notified the European powers that this treaty gave them a protectorate over all of Ethiopia. Menelik protested, showing that the Amharic version of the treaty said no such thing, but his protests were ignored.

On March 1, 1896, Ethiopia's conflict with the Italians, the First Italo–Ethiopian War, was resolved by the complete defeat of the Italian armed forces at the Battle of Adwa. Local chiefs had played a significant role during the war periods by mobilizing their peoples for the battle including Gambella. At this time, patriot Oballa Gnigwo had taken part in the war with the Italians. A provisional treaty of peace was concluded at Addis Ababa on October 26, 1896, which acknowledged the independence of Ethiopia.

Menelik granted the first railway concession, from the coast at Djibouti (French Somaliland) to the interior, to a French company in 1894. The railway was completed to Dire Dawa, 45 kilometres (28 miles) from Harar, by the last day of 1902.

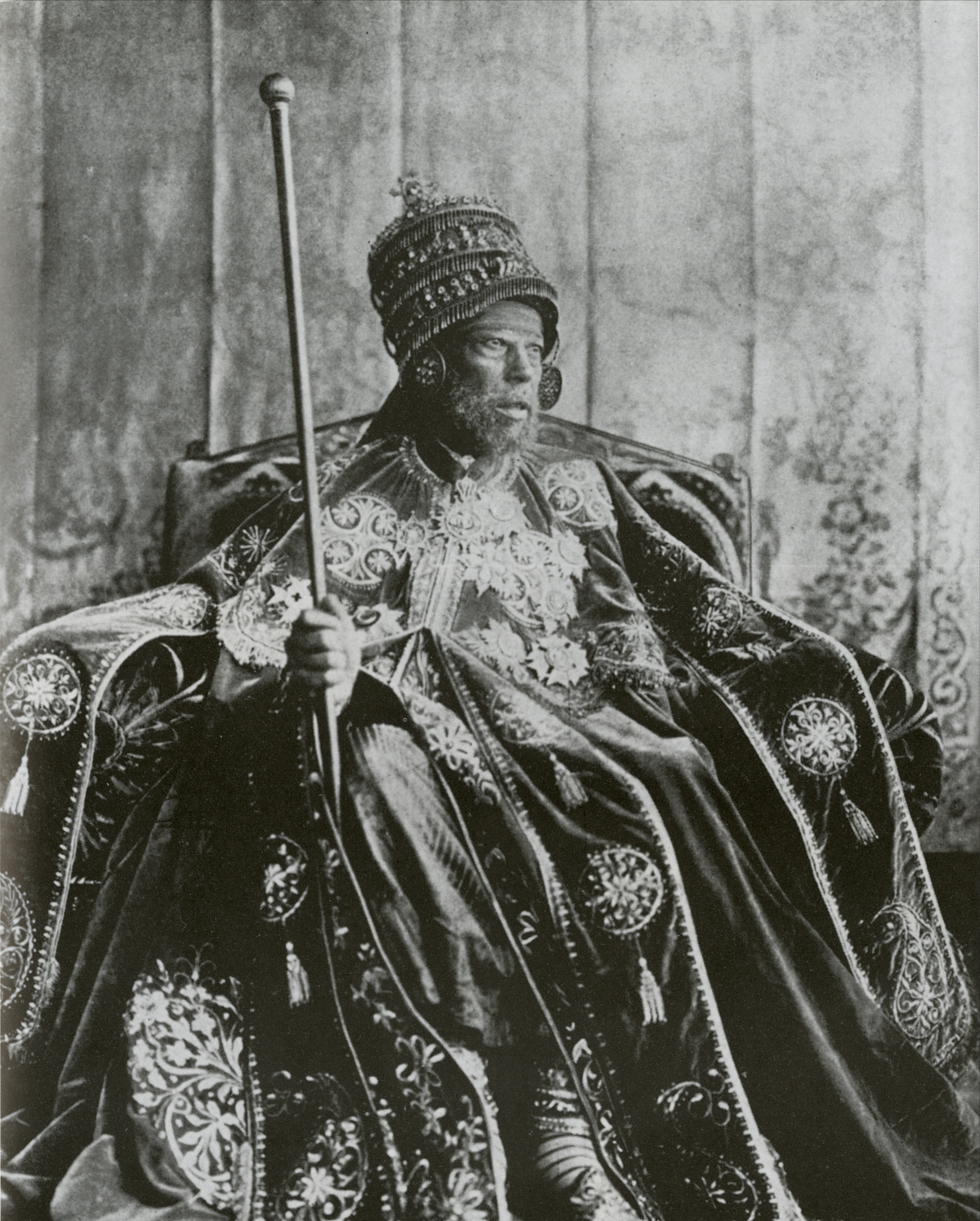
Menelik II

Under the reign of Menelik, beginning in the 1880s, Ethiopia set off from the central province of Shoa, to incorporate 'the lands and people of the South, East and West into an empire'. The people incorporated were the western Oromo (non-Shoan Oromo), Sidama, Gurage, Wolayta and other groups. He began expanding his kingdom to the south and east, expanding into areas that had never been under his rule, resulting in the borders of Ethiopia of today. He did this with the help of Ras Gobena's Shewan Oromo militia. During the conquest of the Oromo, the Ethiopian Army carried genocidal mass atrocities against the Oromo population including mass mutilation, mass killings and large-scale slavery. Some estimates for the number of people killed as a result of the conquest go into the millions. Large-scale atrocities were also committed against the Dizi people and the people of the Kaficho kingdom. Slavery was of ancient origins in Ethiopia and continued into the early 20th century. It was widely practised in the new territories, and tolerated by the authorities who often owned slaves themselves. Slaves could be bought and sold (but not to non-Christians) and had limited legal rights. They did have the right to worship, and the right not to have their families broken up by sales.

=== Lij Iyasu, Zewditu and Haile Selassie (1913–1936) ===
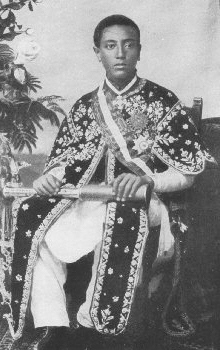
Lij Iyasu, the designated Emperor of Ethiopia from 1913 to 1916.

When Menelik II died, his grandson, Lij Iyasu, succeeded to the throne but soon lost support because of his Muslim ties. He was deposed in 1916 by the Christian nobility, and Menelik's daughter, Zewditu, was made empress. Her cousin, Ras Tafari Makonnen, was made regent and successor to the throne.

Upon the death of Empress Zewditu in 1930, Ras Tafari Makonnen, adopting the throne name Haile Selassie, was crowned Emperor Haile Selassie I of Ethiopia. His full title was "His Imperial Majesty Haile Selassie I, Conquering Lion of the Tribe of Judah, King of Kings of Ethiopia and Elect of God."

Following the death of Abba Jifar II of Jimma, Emperor Haile Selassie seized the opportunity to annex Jimma. In 1932, the Kingdom of Jimma was formally absorbed into Ethiopia. During the reorganization of the provinces in 1942, Jimma vanished into Kaffa Province.

The abolition of slavery became a high priority for the Haile Selassie regime. International pressures forced action, and it was required for membership in the League of Nations. Final success was achieved by 1942.

==== Educational modernization ====
Modernization became a priority for the Haile Selassie regime; it began with expanded education opportunities beyond the small old-fashioned schools run by the Ethiopian church. Menelik founded the first modern school in Addis Ababa in 1908 and sent several students to Europe. Haile Selassie sent hundreds of young men and women to study abroad and set up the capital's second modern school in 1925. He established schools and several cities, as well as training institutions and technical schools. Missionaries were also active in education. By 1925 French Franciscan sisters were well-established, running an orphanage, a dispensary, a leper colony and 10 schools with 350 girl students. They settled in the cities of Addis Ababa and Dire Dawa, along the Franco-Ethiopian railway which opened in 1917. The schools were highly attractive to upper-class Ethiopians. In 1935, 119 Catholic and Protestant missions were educating 6717 pupils across the nation.

==== Italian occupation (1936–1941) ====
Coat of Arms of the acclaimed "Emperor of Ethiopia" Victor Emmanuel II

Emperor Haile Selassie's reign was violently disrupted in 1935 when fascist Italian forces invaded and occupied Ethiopia under the orders of dictator Benito Mussolini. The invasion began on October 2, 1935, and culminated in the occupation of the capital, Addis Ababa, on May 5, 1936. Despite Haile Selassie's appeal to the League of Nations for collective security, the international community failed to act decisively. Ethiopia was formally annexed on May 9, and the Emperor went into exile.

Casualties among Ethiopians were staggering. The Emperor claimed that more than 275,000 Ethiopian fighters were killed, compared to 1,537 Italians. Italian sources placed the death toll at 16,000 Ethiopians and 2,700 Italians (including colonial troops).Antonicelli, Franco. Trent'anni di storia italiana 1915–1945, p. 133. During the occupation, at least 78,500 Ethiopian patriots were killed in resistance efforts. An additional 17,800 civilians were killed by aerial bombardment, and approximately 35,000 died in fascist concentration camps.Clodfelter, Micheal (2017). Warfare and Armed Conflicts: A Statistical Encyclopedia of Casualty and Other Figures, 1492–2015, 4th ed. McFarland. p. 355. ISBN 978-0786474707.

Italian forces committed widespread war crimes during the occupation. They used mustard gas and other banned chemical weapons against both Ethiopian fighters and civilians, in clear violation of the Geneva Conventions.Belladonna, Simone (2015). Gas in Etiopia: I crimini rimossi dell'Italia coloniale (in Italian). Neri Pozza Editore. ISBN 9788854510739.Mack Smith, Denis (1983) [1981]. Mussolini. London: Granada. pp. 231, 417. ISBN 0-586-08444-4. OCLC 12481387. Italian aircraft deliberately bombed hospitals and ambulances of the Red Cross.Rainer Baudendistel, Between bombs and good intentions: the Red Cross and the Italo-Ethiopian War, 1935–1936. Berghahn Books. 2006 pp. 131–132, 239 The 1937 Yekatit 12 massacre in Addis Ababa stands as one of the worst atrocities, where Italian soldiers murdered as many as 30,000 civilians in retaliation for an assassination attempt against Rodolfo Graziani, the fascist viceroy.Campbell, Ian (2017). The Addis Ababa Massacre: Italy's National Shame. London. ISBN 978-1-84904-692-3. OCLC 999629248.Martel, Gordon (1999). The origins of the Second World War reconsidered : A.J.P. Taylor and the Historians (2nd ed.). London: Routledge. p. 188. ISBN 0-203-01024-8. OCLC 252806536.Barker, A. J. (1968). The Civilising Mission: The Italo-Ethiopian War 1935–6. London: Cassell. pp. 292–293. ISBN 978-0-304-93201-6. Roughly 300 tons of mustard gas and thousands of chemical munitions were used to terrorize and suppress the population.Sbacchi, A (2005), "Poison Gas and Atrocities in the Italo-Ethiopian War (1935–1936)", in Ben-Ghiat, R.; Fuller, M. (eds.), Italian Colonialism, Italian and Italian American Studies, New York: Palgrave Macmillan, pp. 47–56, doi:10.1007/978-1-4039-8158-5_5, ISBN 978-0-230-60636-4

Some documented acts of violence by Ethiopian fighters included the use of Dum-Dum bullets and the killing of colonial laborers during clashes such as the Gondrand massacre. Instances of mutilation of prisoners were reported. However, these acts were isolated and did not reflect the systemic nature or scale of Italian atrocities.

Italy sought international legitimacy for its annexation of Ethiopia in 1936. All member nations of the League of Nations except the Soviet Union ultimately recognized it, including Britain and France.Antonicelli; p. 85 Victor Emmanuel III, the Italian king, was declared Emperor of Ethiopia. Mussolini proclaimed that the defeat of Ethiopia was revenge for the Italian loss at Adwa and boasted about abolishing slavery. This claim ignored the context in which it was used to justify occupation, and it remains a deeply controversial element of fascist propaganda.Del Boca, Angelo. Italiani in Africa Orientale: La conquista dell'Impero, p. 131.

The Italian regime implemented forced infrastructure development, primarily to serve settler colonists and the extraction of resources. Projects such as the "imperial road" between Addis Ababa and Massawa were built through coerced labor."1940 Article on the special road Addis Ababa-Assab and map (in Italian)" (PDF). Archived from the original (PDF) on 2012-04-02. The regime aimed to resettle 500,000 Italians on Ethiopian land. By 1939, approximately 35,000 colonists had arrived, concentrated in urban areas.Antonicelli; p. 106 Italian emigration in Etiopia (in Italian)

Italian authorities dismantled Ethiopia's indigenous educational institutions and replaced them with two-tiered colonial systems. Schools for Italians received significant investment, while those for native Ethiopians were designed to instill obedience and submission. Textbooks glorified Mussolini and promoted militarism. This deliberate intellectual suppression aimed to ensure colonial domination.Pankhurst, "Education in Ethiopia during the Italian fascist occupation (1936–1941)." (1972) pp. 361–396. A plan to establish a university in Addis Ababa in 1939 was never realized due to the outbreak of World War II.Addis abeba «italiana»: il Piano regolatore e la serie delle sue Varianti (1936–1939)."Mai-Ministero dell'Africa italiana (in Italian); pp. 63–126

===== World War II =====
In spring 1941 the Italians were defeated by British and Allied forces, including Ethiopian resistance fighters. Emperor Haile Selassie returned to Addis Ababa on May 5 and reclaimed the throne. After their final stand at Gondar in November, remaining Italian forces waged a scattered guerrilla campaign until 1943. Following Italy's defeat, Ethiopia entered a short phase of British military oversight, before full sovereignty was restored in 1944. Some territories remained under British control beyond that date. Eritrea became a federated part of Ethiopia in 1952, which ultimately triggered the Eritrean independence struggle.

==== Post–World War II period (1941–1974) ====
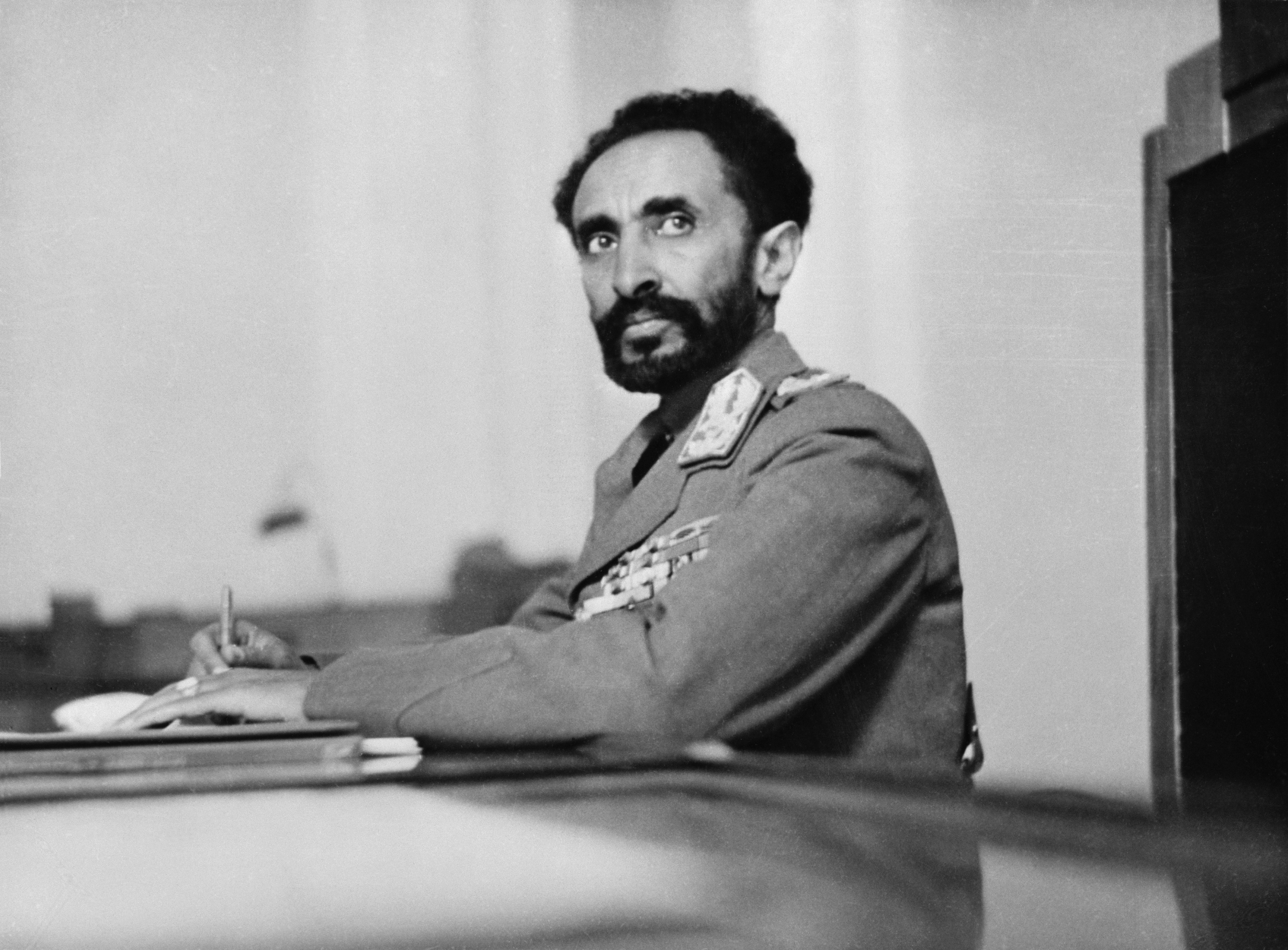
Haile Selassie c. 1942

After World War II, Emperor Haile Selassie made numerous efforts to promote the modernization of his nation. The country's first important school of higher education, University College of Addis Ababa, was founded in 1950. The Constitution of 1931 was replaced with the 1955 constitution which expanded the powers of the Parliament. While improving diplomatic ties with the United States, Haile Selassie also sought to improve the nation's relationship with other African nations. To do this, in 1963, he helped to found the Organisation of African Unity.

Haile Selassie was nearly deposed in a 1960 coup attempt. In 1961 the 30-year Eritrean War for Independence began, following the Ethiopian Emperor Haile Selassie I's dissolution of the federation and shutting down the Eritrean parliament. The Emperor declared Eritrea the fourteenth province of Ethiopia in 1962. The Negus suffered criticism due to the expenses involved in fighting the Nationalist forces.

By the early 1970s Emperor Haile Selassie's advanced age was becoming apparent. As Paul B. Henze explains: "Most Ethiopians thought in terms of personalities, not ideology, and out of long habit still looked to Haile Selassie as the initiator of change, the source of status and privilege, and the arbiter of demands for resources and attention among competing groups." The nature of the succession, and the desirability of the Imperial monarchy in general, were in dispute amongst the Ethiopian people.

Perceptions of this war as imperialist were among the primary causes of the growing Ethiopian Communist movement. In the early 1970s, the Ethiopian Communists received the support of the Soviet Union under the leadership of Leonid Brezhnev. This help led to the 1974 coup of Mengistu.

The government's failure to effect significant economic and political reforms over the previous fourteen years created a climate of unrest. Combined with rising inflation, corruption, a famine that affected several provinces (especially Welo and Tigray) but was concealed from the outside world, and the growing discontent of urban interest groups, the country was ripe for revolution. The unrest that began in January 1974 became an outburst of general discontent. The Ethiopian military began to both organize and incite a full-fledged revolution.

=== Communist period (1974–1991) ===
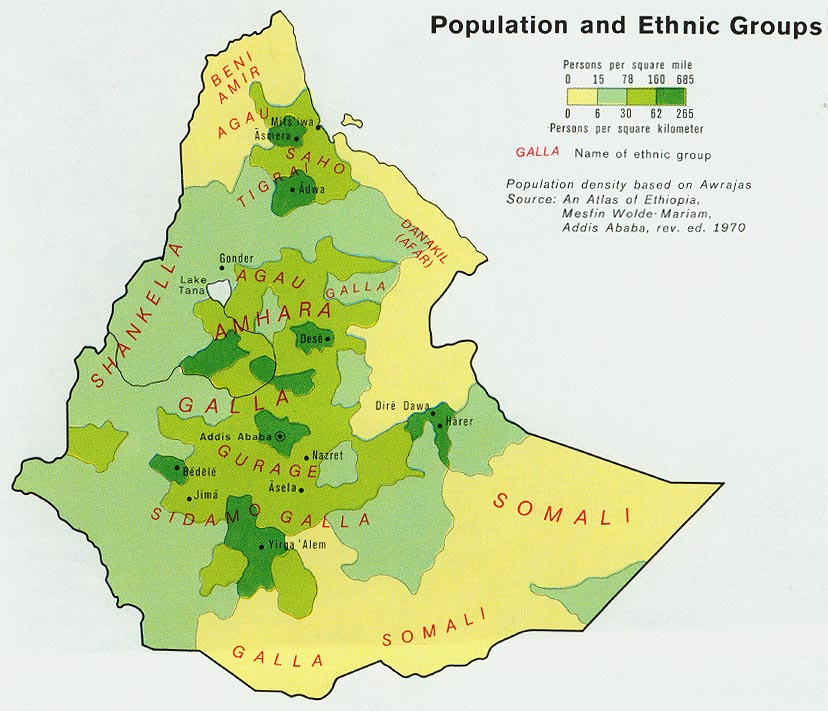
Population in 1976 Ethiopia, when Eritrea was the fourteenth province.

After a period of civil unrest that began in February 1974, a provisional administrative council of soldiers, known as the Derg ("committee"), seized power from the ageing Emperor Haile Selassie I on September 12, 1974, and installed a government that was socialist in name and military in style. The Derg summarily executed 59 members of the former government, including two former prime ministers and crown councillors, court officials, ministers, and generals. Emperor Haile Selassie died on August 27, 1975. He was allegedly strangled in the basement of his palace or smothered with a wet pillow.

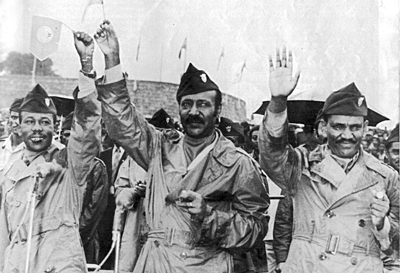
High-ranking Derg members: Mengistu Haile Mariam, Teferi Benti and Atnafu Abate

Lt. Col. Mengistu Haile Mariam assumed power as head of state and Derg chairman, after having his two predecessors killed, as well as tens of thousands of other suspected opponents. The new government undertook socialist reforms, including nationalisation of landlords' property and the church's property. Before the coup, Ethiopian peasants' way of life was thoroughly influenced by the church teachings; 280 days a year were religious feasts or days of rest. Mengistu's years in office were marked by a totalitarian-style government and the country's massive militarization, financed by the Soviet Union and the Eastern Bloc, and assisted by Cuba. In December 1976, an Ethiopian delegation in Moscow signed a military assistance agreement with the Soviet Union. The following April 1977, Ethiopia abrogated its military assistance agreement with the United States and expelled the American military missions.

The new regime in Ethiopia met with armed resistance from the large landowners, the royalists and the nobility. The resistance was largely centred in the province of Eritrea. The Derg decided in November 1974 to pursue war in Eritrea rather than seek a negotiated settlement. By mid-1976, the resistance had gained control of most of the towns and the countryside of Eritrea.

In July 1977, Somalia intervened to support the Western Somali Liberation Front, which had already been waging a guerrilla insurgency for self-determination in the Somali-inhabited 'Ogaden' region under Ethiopian administration. This direct involvement significantly expanded the conflict (see Ogaden War). They were assisted in this invasion by the armed Western Somali Liberation Front. Approximately one million Somalis residing in Ethiopia, along with those who regularly cross the border, supported Mogadishu's call for an ethnically determined "Greater Somalia". Ethiopian forces were driven back far inside their frontiers but, with the assistance of a massive Soviet airlift of arms and 17,000 Cuban combat forces, they stemmed the attack. The last major Somali regular units left the Ogaden March 15, 1978. Twenty years later, the Somali region of Ethiopia remained underdeveloped and insecure.

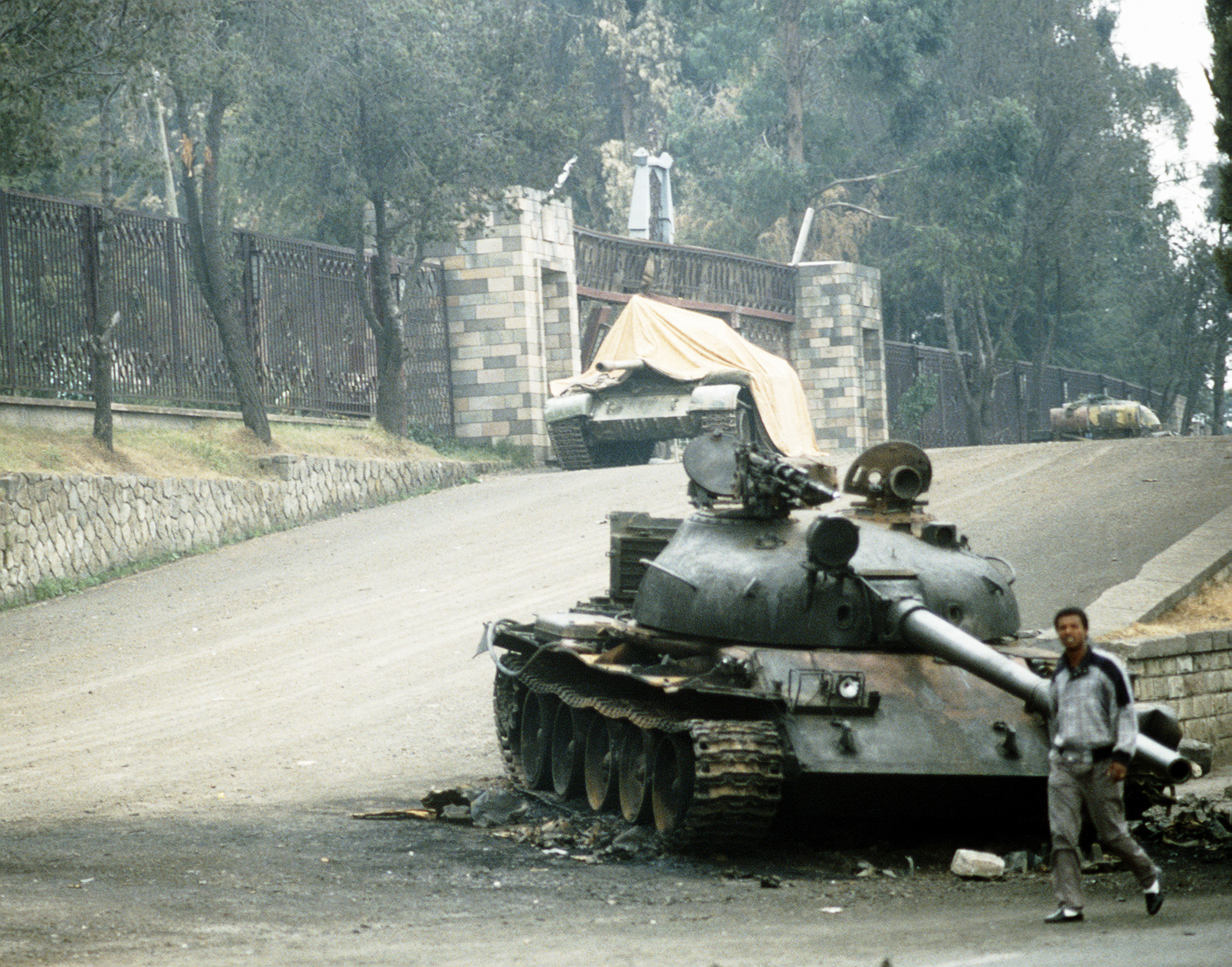
A tank in Addis Ababa after rebels seized the capital during the Ethiopian Civil War

From 1977 through early 1978, thousands of suspected enemies of the Derg were tortured and/or killed in a purge called the Qey Shibir ("Red Terror"). Communism was officially adopted during the late 1970s and early 1980s; in 1984, the Workers' Party of Ethiopia (WPE) was established, and on February 1, 1987, a new Soviet-style civilian constitution was submitted to a popular referendum. It was officially endorsed by 81% of voters, and in accordance with this new constitution, the country was renamed the People's Democratic Republic of Ethiopia on September 10, 1987, and Mengistu became president.

The regime's collapse was hastened by droughts and a famine, which affected around 8 million people and left 1 million dead, as well as by insurrections, particularly in the northern regions of Tigray and Eritrea. The regime also conducted a brutal campaign of resettlement and villagization in Ethiopia in the 1980s. In 1989, the Tigrayan Peoples' Liberation Front (TPLF) merged with other ethnically based opposition movements to form the Ethiopian Peoples' Revolutionary Democratic Front (EPRDF). In May 1991, EPRDF forces advanced on Addis Ababa. Mengistu fled the country to asylum in Zimbabwe, where he still resides.

Hundreds of thousands were killed due to the Red Terror, forced deportations, or using hunger as a weapon. In 2006, after a long trial, Mengistu was found guilty of genocide. The Derg government relocated numerous Amharas into southern Ethiopia where they served in government administration, courts, and even in school, where Oromo texts were eliminated and replaced by Amharic. The government perceived the various southern minority languages as hindrances to Ethiopian national identity expansion.

== Federal Democratic Republic ==
=== Tigray People's Liberation Front dominance (1991–2018) ===
Flag of Ethiopia since 2009

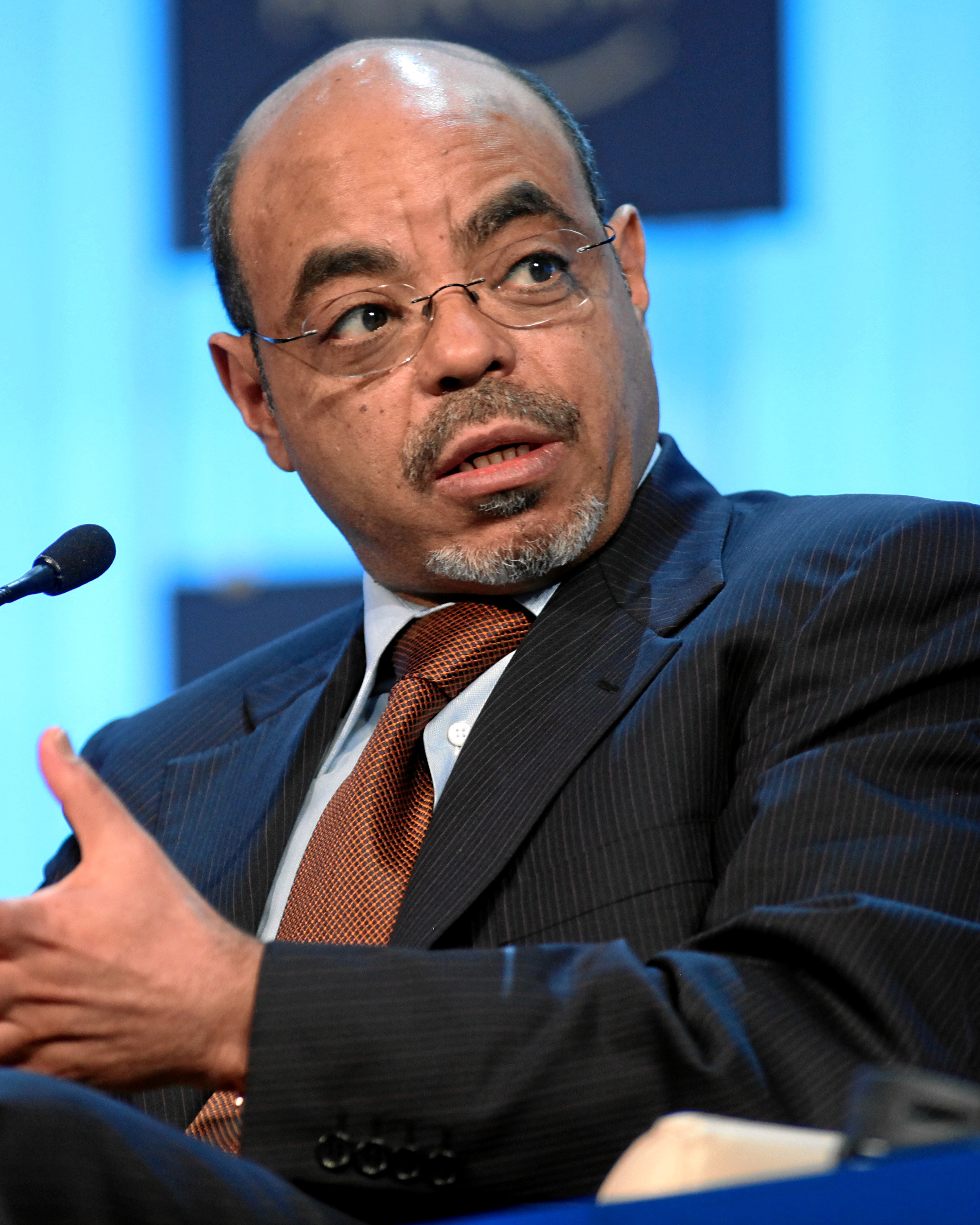
Former Ethiopian Prime Minister Meles Zenawi was one of the key founders of modern-day Ethiopia, under the FDRE system

In July 1991, the EPRDF convened a National Conference to establish the Transitional Government of Ethiopia composed of an 87-member Council of Representatives and guided by a national charter that functioned as a transitional constitution. In June 1992, the Oromo Liberation Front withdrew from the government; in March 1993, members of the Southern Ethiopia Peoples' Democratic Coalition also left the government. In 1994, a new constitution was written that established a parliamentary republic with a bicameral legislature and a judicial system. The first multiparty election took place in May 1995, which was won by the EPRDF. The president of the transitional government, EPRDF leader Meles Zenawi, became the first Prime Minister of the Federal Democratic Republic of Ethiopia, and Negasso Gidada was elected its president.

Ethiopia's 3rd multiparty election on 15 May 2005 was highly disputed, with many opposition groups claiming fraud. Though the Carter Center approved the pre-election conditions, it expressed its dissatisfaction with post-election events. European Union election observers cited state support for the EPRDF campaign, as well as irregularities in ballot counting and results publishing. The opposition parties gained more than 200 parliamentary seats, compared with just 12 in the 2000 elections. While most of the opposition representatives joined the parliament, some leaders of the CUD party who refused to take up their parliamentary seats were accused of inciting the post-election violence and were imprisoned. Amnesty International considered them "prisoners of conscience" and they were subsequently released.

Meles died on 20 August 2012 in Brussels, where he was being treated for an unspecified illness. Deputy Prime Minister Hailemariam Desalegn was appointed as a new prime minister until the 2015 elections, and remained so afterwards with his party in control of every parliamentary seat.

Protests broke out across the country on 5 August 2016, and hundreds of protesters were subsequently shot and killed by police. The protesters demanded an end to human rights abuses, the release of political prisoners, a fairer redistribution of the wealth generated by over a decade of economic growth, and a return of Wolqayt District to the Amhara Region. Following these protests, Ethiopia declared a state of emergency on 6 October 2016, which was lifted in August 2017. On 16 February 2018, the government of Ethiopia declared another nationwide state of emergency following the resignation of Prime Minister Hailemariam Desalegn. Hailemariam was the first ruler in modern Ethiopian history to step down; previous leaders have died in office or been overthrown.

==== Eritrean–Ethiopian border conflict ====
In April 1993, Eritrea gained independence from Ethiopia after a national referendum. While relations between the two countries were initially friendly, by May 1998, a border dispute with Eritrea led to the Eritrean–Ethiopian War, which lasted until June 2000 and cost both countries an estimated $1 million a day, leaving a profoundly negative impact on their economies. Major combat operations ended after signing a peace treaty in December 2000; however, skirmishes and proxy conflicts between the two nations would continue until 2018.

==== War in Somalia ====
In 2006, an Islamic organisation seen by many as having ties with al-Qaeda, the Islamic Courts Union (ICU), spread rapidly in Somalia. Ethiopia sent logistical support to the Transitional Federal Government opposing the Islamists. Finally, on December 20, 2006, active fighting broke out between the ICU and Ethiopian Army. As the Islamist forces were no match against the Ethiopian regular army, they decided to retreat and merge among the civilians, and most of the ICU-held Somalia was quickly taken. Human Rights Watch accused Ethiopia of various abuses including indiscriminate killing of civilians during the Battle of Mogadishu (March–April 2007). Ethiopian forces pulled out of Somalia in January 2009, leaving a small African Union force and a smaller Somali Transitional Government force to maintain the peace. Reports immediately emerged of religious fundamentalist forces occupying one of two former Ethiopian bases in Mogadishu shortly after withdrawal.

=== Abiy Ahmed and the Prosperity Party (2018–present) ===
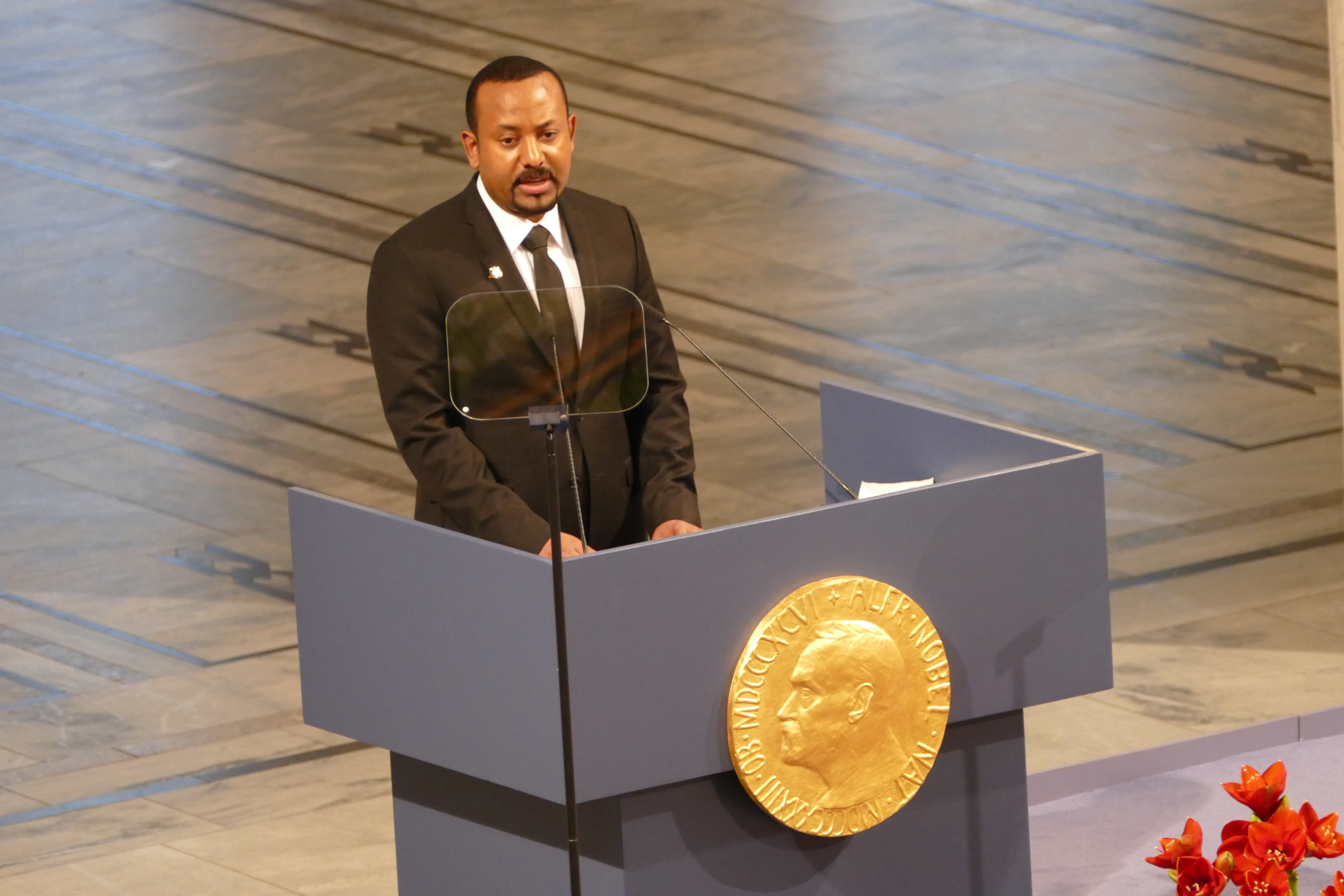
Prime Minister Abiy Ahmed receiving the Nobel Peace Prize in Oslo in 2019

On 2 April 2018, Abiy Ahmed, an Oromo, was declared Prime Minister. In addition, Sahle-Work Zewde became the 4th president of Ethiopia, the first woman to hold the office. Early in his term, Prime Minister Abiy made an historic visit to Eritrea in 2018, ending the state of conflict between the two countries. For his efforts in ending the 20-year-long war between Ethiopia and Eritrea, Abiy Ahmed was awarded the Nobel prize for peace in 2019. After taking office in April 2018, Abiy released political prisoners, promised fair elections for 2019 and announced sweeping economic reforms. As of 6 June 2019, all the previously censored websites were made accessible again, over 13,000 political prisoners were released and hundreds of administrative staff were fired as part of the reforms.

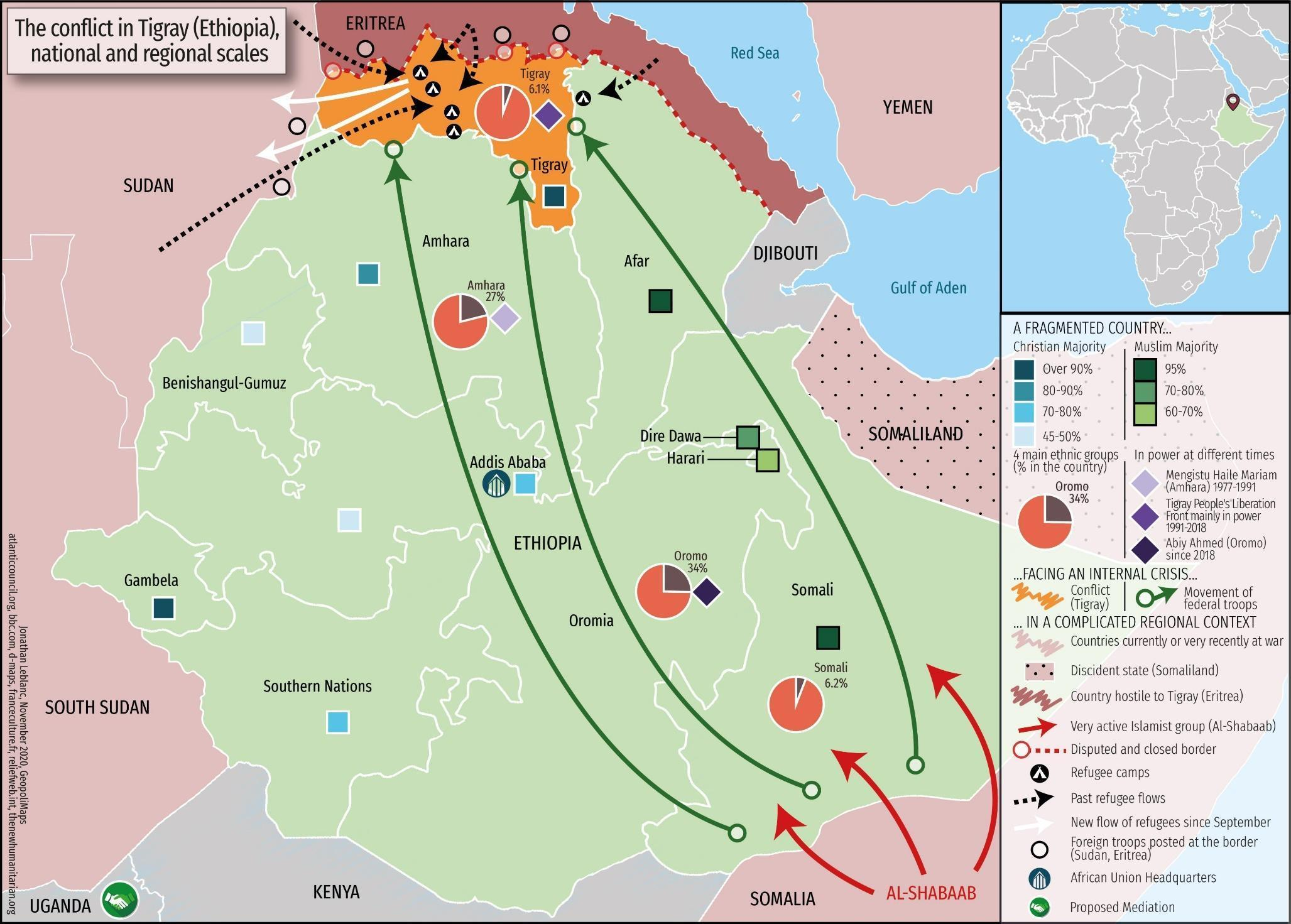
Map illustrating the Ethiopian civil conflict as of 2022; included are al-Shabaab attacks, the Tigray War zone, and the redeployment of federal troops from the southeast to the north.

An alliance between Fano, an Amhara youth militia and Qeerroo, its Oromo counterpart, played a crucial role in the bringing about the political and administrative changes associated with the premiership of Abiy Ahmed. During the Tigray War, Fano supported federal and regional security forces against rebels aligned with the Tigray People's Liberation Front (TPLF). Fano units have been accused of participating in ethnic massacres, including that of 58 Qemant people in Metemma during 10–11 2019, and of armed actions in Humera in November 2020.

Ethnic violence and political unrest rose throughout the 2010s and into the 2020s. There were Oromo–Somali clashes between the Oromo, who make up the largest ethnic group in the country, and the ethnic Somalis, leading to up to 400,000 being displaced in 2017. Gedeo–Oromo clashes between the Oromo and the Gedeo people in the south of the country led to Ethiopia having the largest number of people to flee their homes in the world in 2018, with 1.4 million newly displaced people. Starting in 2019, in the Metekel conflict, fighting in the Metekel Zone of the Benishangul-Gumuz Region in Ethiopia has reportedly involved militias from the Gumuz people against Amharas and Agaws. In March 2020, the leader of an Amhara militia called Fano, Solomon Atanaw, stated that they would not disarm until Metekel Zone and the Tigray Region districts of Welkait and Raya were returned to the control of Amhara Region.

==== COVID-19 pandemic ====
The federal government, under the Prosperity Party, requested that the National Election Board of Ethiopia cancel elections for 2020 due to health and safety concerns about COVID-19. No official date was set for the next election at that time, but the government promised that once a vaccine was developed for COVID-19 elections would move forward. The Tigrayan ruling party, TPLF, opposed cancelling the elections and, when their request to the federal government to hold elections was rejected, the TPLF proceeded to hold elections anyway on 9 September 2020. They worked with regional opposition parties and included international observers in the election process. It was estimated that 2.7 million people participated in the election.

==== Tigray War ====
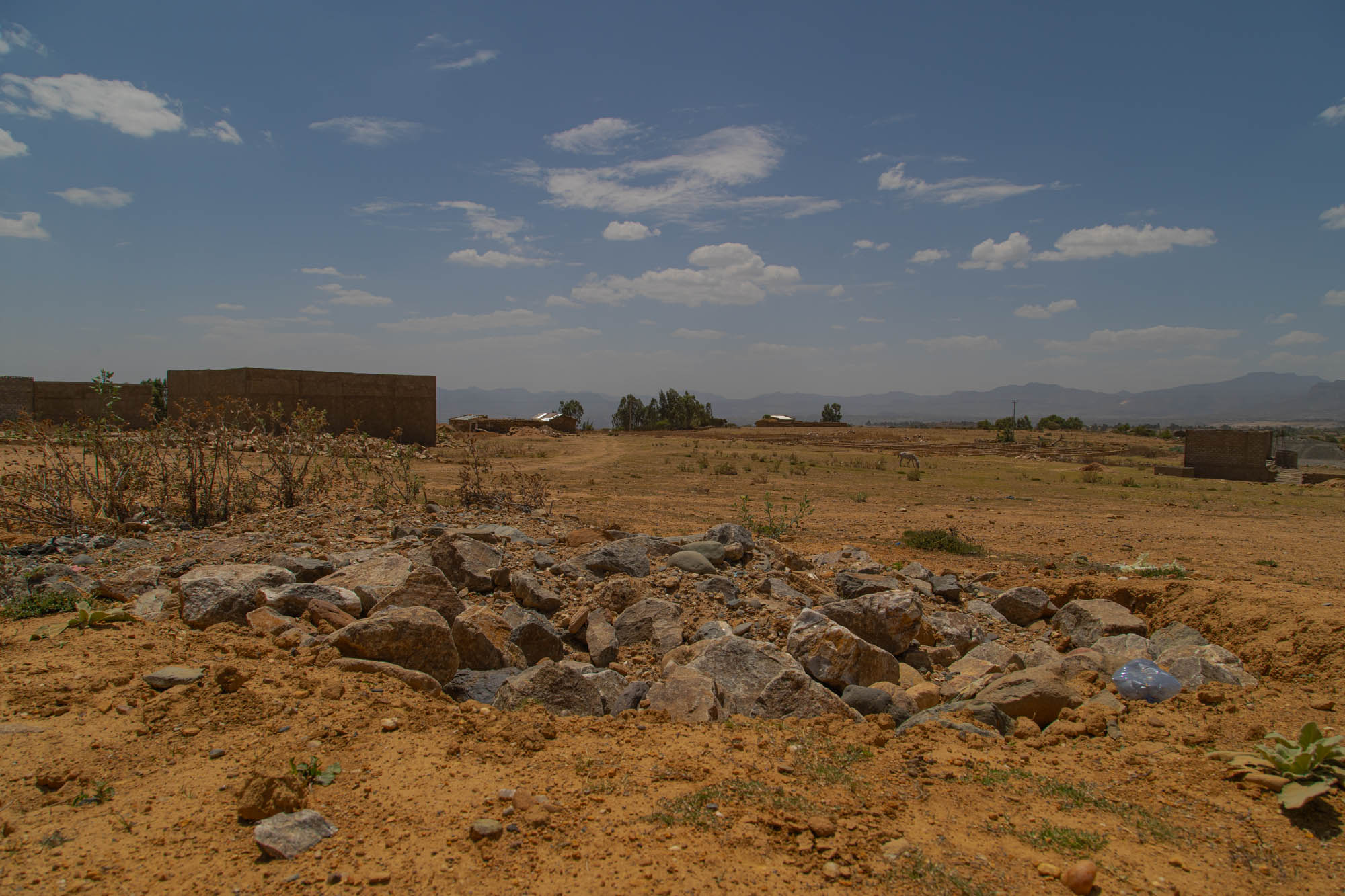
A mass grave of civilians killed as a result of the Tigray War

Relations between the federal government and the Tigray regional government deteriorated after the election, and on 4 November 2020, Abiy began a military offensive in the Tigray Region in response to attacks on army units stationed there, causing thousands of refugees to flee to neighbouring Sudan and triggering the Tigray War. More than 600 civilians were killed in a massacre in the town of Mai Kadra on 9 November 2020. In April 2021, Eritrea confirmed its troops are fighting in Ethiopia. As of March 2022, as many as 500,000 people had died as a result of violence and famine in the Tigray War, with other reported estimates reaching numbers as high as 700,000–800,000 by the end of 2022. After a number of peace and mediation proposals in the intervening years, Ethiopia and the Tigrayan rebel forces agreed to a cessation of hostilities on 2 November 2022; as Eritrea was not a party to the agreement, however, their status remained unclear.

== See also ==
- Beta Israel
  - History of the Jews in Africa § Ethiopia
    - History of the Jews in Ethiopia
- Rulers of Ethiopia
  - Emperor of Ethiopia
    - List of emperors of Ethiopia
  - Emperors family tree
  - List of heads of government of Ethiopia
    - List of presidents of Ethiopia
- Human rights in Ethiopia
  - Slavery in Ethiopia
- Addis Ababa history and timeline
- Culture of Ethiopia
- Politics of Ethiopia
- Religion in Ethiopia
- Ethiopian historiography
- Economic history of Ethiopia
- Italians of Ethiopia
- Kingdom of Jimma
- Subdivisions of Ethiopia
- List of human evolution fossils
- List of rebel groups in Ethiopia
- People of Ethiopia
- Political history of Eastern Africa
- District XVII (satrapy)

== Historiography ==
- Crummey, Donald. "Society, State and Nationality in the Recent Historiography of Ethiopia" Journal of African History 31#1 (1990), pp. 103–119 JSTOR 182803
