= District XVII (satrapy) =

District XVII was, according to Herodotus, the 17th satrapy of the Achaemenid Empire. It comprised the Paricanians, "Asiatic Ethiopians" ("burnt faced ones", literally "dark skinned ones"; referring to Indian people), Oreitians, and Ichthyophagi.

== See also ==
- Baluchistan
