= Guassa Community Conservation Area =

Protected area in Amhara Region, Ethiopia

- Location within Ethiopia
- Location: Menz Province, Amhara Region, Ethiopia
- Nearest city: Dessie
- Coordinates: 10°20′32″N 39°45′46″E
- Area: 100 km^{2} (39 mi^{2})
- Established: 17th century

The Guassa Community Conservation Area (GCCA) is a protected area in central Ethiopia. It is one of the oldest known common property resource management in Sub-Saharan Africa. It has been the focus of an indigenous natural resource management institution, known as “Qero,” system for over 400 years It is located 80 km off the main highway, and is home to numerous endemic birds and wildlife species, including the iconic Ethiopian wolf and the Ethiopian gelada. The high altitude Afro-alpine Festuca grassland, or ‘Guassa” grass gives the area its name.

== Location ==
GCCA lies at a latitude of 10° 15′ – 10° 27′ N and longitude of 39° 45′ – 39° 49′ E. The area is part of the Menz-Gera Administrative District in the North Shoa Administrative Zone of the regional state of Amhara Region. The district capital is the town of Mehal Meda located 20 km from the Guassa Area.

== The Qero System ==
The Guassa Area originated as a community-based natural resource management system known as “Qero” over 400 years ago. It is one of the oldest known conservation areas in Sub-Saharan Africa. The Qero system is organized by two formally elected chiefs who oversee the beneficiary communities to ensure equitable resource distribution, and enforce the bylaws protecting the common property resources. Based on traditional tenure patterns, rules of protection and utilization as well as enforcement are essential aspects of the Qero system. Further organization of the user community into parishes gave the Guassa area the status of consecrated land, under the protective patronage of the parish, which reinforced the Qero system with the prestige, power, and authority of another important local level institution. In the process, the Guassa common property resources became a kind of sacred entity. Following the 1974 popular revolution, the government nationalized all rural land in the country and disbanded all local level land tenure and common property natural resource management institutions. This agrarian reform destroyed the functionality of the Qero system and the Guassa area was turned into an open access resource, which resulted in an extreme decline of natural resources in the area.

== The People of Guassa ==
The population of the Menz Gera Administrative District is about 111,000. The population is predominantly Amhara, one of the largest cultural ethnic groups in the country. Their language is Amharic, the official language of Ethiopia, which is a Semitic language descended from Ge’ez, the ancient liturgical language of Ethiopia now only used in the Ethiopian Orthodox Church to which most people belong.

== Climate ==
Annual rainfall for Guassa averages 1,200 mm to 1,600 mm. The area is characterized by mild days and cold nights and is malaria free. In the driest months (December through February) the daytime temperature can rise to 23 °C (73 °F) while at night it can fall to −10 °C (14 °F). There is frequent frost and fog in the dry season. The temperature variation is less in the wet season with a daytime temperature of 12 °C (54 °F) and a nighttime temperature of 3 °C (37 °F). Guassa can be visited at any time of the year, although persistent rainfall in July and August makes that season the least favorable.

== Habitat ==
The Guassa Area ranges in altitude from 3,200 to 3,700 meters above sea level. The rugged mountain plateau is crosscut by gorges and river valleys running westwards. The area forms the watershed between the Nile and Awash River systems and thus performs an important hydrological function and catchment area. The eastern edge of the Guassa Area falls away abruptly as cliffs drop into the Great Rift Valley. Just 100 km away, the land melts into the Awash plain forming the floor of the Great Rift Valley.

== Wildlife ==
=== Flora ===
Guassa supports important and endemic plant species including Guassa grass, giant lobelia, Erica moorlands, Helichrysum and Alchemilla species. The Afro-montane vegetation of the Guassa Area varies with altitude and is a key attraction of the area. Other common plant species found in the area include Carex monostachya, Carex fischeri and Kniphofia foliosa of the family Asphodelaceae. Climbing in altitude, Euryops-Alchemilla shrubland occurs over 3,200 meters on flat, gentle slopes and well-drained areas. The shrubby vegetation of Euryops pinifolius (Compositae family is extensively used as firewood by the communities living adjacent to the Guassa Area. Above 3,200 meters, Euryops-Festuca grassland is usually interspersed with scattered structures similar to Mima mounds that can reach a height of 1.5 meters and a diameter of 5 to 10 meters. These mounds consist of highly organic and deep soil. They are made by rodents, the most important of which is the common mole rat. As the altitude increases, the vegetation changes abruptly to Helichrysum-Festuca type of grassland followed by Erica moorland. The torch lily or red-hot poker (Kniphofia spp.) covers entire hillsides with its flame-colored flowers between June and November. The palm-like giant lobelia (Lobelia rhynchopetalum) is most spectacular and reaches up to 12 meters in height.

=== Fauna ===
==== Mammals ====
The Guassa area harbors nine (23%) of the endemic mammals of Ethiopia, including the Ethiopian wolf, the Gelada and the Ethiopian highland hare. The Ethiopian wolf is legally protected and with a total world population of less than 450 is the most endangered canid in the world. With six packs of wolves, the Guassa area is a key population of the species. The gelada is the only living member of the once widespread genus Theropithecus and is only found in the highlands of northern Ethiopia. They live in large groups reaching up to 400 individuals where the spectacular male guard harems of females. Other mammals of the area include klipspringers, jackals, leopards, spotted hyenas, civets and servals.

==== Avifauna ====
114 bird species have been recorded in the Guassa Area: 12% of the 862 species of birds in Ethiopia. The area is also home to a multitude of birds of prey and serves as a wintering ground for 38 species of Palearctic and intra-African migratory birds. Endemic birds include: Ankober serin (Serinus ankoberensis), Abyssinian catbird (Parophasma galinieri), Abyssinian longclaw (Macronyx flavicollis), blue-winged goose (Cyanochen cyanoptera), Ethiopian/black-headed siskin (Serinus nigriceps), black-winged lovebird (Agapornis taranta), Rouget's rail (Rougetius rougetii), spot-breasted plover (Vanellus melanocephalus), thick-billed raven (Corvus crassirostris), wattled ibis (Bostrychia carunculata), white-collared pigeon (Columba albitorques) and white-winged cliff chat (Myrmecocichla semirufa).

== See also ==
- Community-based conservation
- EthioTrees
