= Mehal Meda =

Town in Amhara Region, Ethiopia

Coordinates: 10°18′N 39°39′E

Mehal Meda (Amharic: መኻል ሜዳ Mehal Mēda) is a town in Ethiopia situated in the Semien Shewa Zone of the Amhara Region. It has a geographical coordinates of 10° 18' 0" North, 39° 40' 0" East, with an altitude of 3132 m above sea level. The town is located 150 km north of Debre Berhan and 224 mi (or 280 km) northeast of the capital Addis Ababa.

Mehal Meda is an administrative center of the Menz Gera Midir woreda in the Amhara Region, Ethiopia. The woreda is partly named after the northern district of the former province of Menz, Gera Meder.

Located at the eastern edge of the Ethiopian Highlands in the Semien Shewa Zone, Menz Gera Midir is bordered on the south by Menz Lalo Midir, on the southwest by Menz Keya Gebreal, on the west by the Qechene River which separates it from the Debub Wollo Zone, on the north by Gishe, on the northeast by Antsokiyana Gemza, and on the east by Efratana Gidim. Menz Gera Midir was part of the former Gera Midirna Keya Gebriel woreda.

== Demographics ==
Based on the 2007 national census conducted by the Central Statistical Agency of Ethiopia (CSA) the town has a total population of 11,055.
