= Gera Midirna Keya Gebriel =

Former district in Amhara Region, Ethiopia

Coordinates: 10°30′N 39°50′E

Gera Midirna Keya Gebriel ("Gera Midir and Keya Gebriel") was one of the 105 woredas in the Amhara Region of Ethiopia. It is partly named after the northern district of the former province of Menz, Gera Meder. Located at the eastern edge of the Ethiopian Highlands in the Semien Shewa Zone, Gera Midira Keya Gebriel was bordered on the south by Mam Midrina Lalo Midir, on the southwest by the Jamma River which separated it from Moretna Jiru, on the northwest by the Qechene River which separates it from the Debub Wollo Zone, on the north by Gishe, and on the east by the Oromia Zone. The administrative center of this woreda was Mehal Meda; other towns include Zemero. It was divided for Menz Gera Midir and Menz Keya Gebreal woredas.

Elevations in Gera Midirna Keya Gebriel range between 1000 and 4000 meters above sea level. The highest point in this woreda, as well as the Zone, is Mount Abuye Meda (4012 meters) near the eastern border.

== Demographics ==
Based on figures published by the Central Statistical Agency in 2005, this woreda has an estimated total population of 183,027, of whom 92,599 are men and 90,428 are women; 14,014 or 7.66% of its population are urban dwellers, which is less than the Zone average of 11.8%. With an estimated area of 1,686.88 square kilometers, Gera Midirna Keya Gebriel has an estimated population density of 108.5 people per square kilometer, which is less than the Zone average of 134.37.

The 1994 national census reported a total population for this woreda of 133,542 in 27,815 households, of whom 66,464 were men and 67,078 were women; 8,054 or 6.03% of its population were urban dwellers. The largest ethnic group reported in Gera Midirna Keya Gebriel was the Amhara (99.91%), and Amharic was spoken as a first language by 99.92%. The majority of the inhabitants practiced Ethiopian Orthodox Christianity, with 99.56% reporting that as their religion.
