= Mam Midrina Lalo Midir =

District in Amhara Region, Ethiopia

Coordinates: 10°15′N 39°20′E

Mam Midrina Lalo Midir (Amharic "Mam-land and Lalo-land") was one of the 105 woredas in the Amhara Region of Ethiopia. It was named in part after the central and southern districts of the former province of Menz, Mama Meder and Lalo Meder. Located at the eastern edge of the Ethiopian Highlands in the Semien Shewa Zone, Mam Midrina Lalo Midir was bordered on the south by Termaber, on the west and north by Gera Midirna Keya Gebriel, on the northeast by Efratana Gidim, and on the east by Kewet. The administrative center of this woreda was Molale; other towns in Mam Midrina Lalo Midir include Midwegere. Mam Midrina Lalo Midir was divided for Menz Mam Midir and Menz Lalo Midir woredas.

== Overview ==
The topography of this woreda has been described as consisting of 40% plains, 50% undulating hills, and 10% steep hills and cliffs. Although it has six primary schools, they were not built to minimum standards or quality. The woreda has perennial springs with the potential for human, animal and small-scale agricultural use; however, these springs are not protected which make human beings and animals liable to water borne diseases. Lastly, a lack of roads and bridges hinder the movement of the local inhabitants.

This woreda was selected as one of the three areas for Agri-Service Ethiopia to implement an Integrated Rural Development Program. This Program operates in 10 kebeles, which cover 30% of the woreda's area. The Program's goals include improving agricultural practices by addressing the degraded crop lands, improving rural water sources, and improving the health and sanitation status of the inhabitants as well as reducing child mortality by 25% by the end of 2002 in the targeted kebeles. Improvements to the local infrastructure were made, most notably by the construction of two light bridges in June 2002.

== Demographics ==
Based on figures published by the Central Statistical Agency in 2005, this woreda has an estimated total population of 141,678, of whom 72,296 are men and 69,382 are women; 6,458 or 4.56% of its population are urban dwellers, which is less than the Zone average of 11.8%. With an estimated area of 1,002.50 square kilometers, Mam Midrina Lalo Midir has an estimated population density of 141.3 people per square kilometer, which is greater than the Zone average of 134.37.

The 1994 national census reported a total population for this woreda of 104,113 in 22,117 households, of whom 51,528 were men and 52,585 were women; 3,725 or 3.58% of its population were urban dwellers. The largest ethnic group reported in Mam Midrina Lalo Midir was the Amhara (99.79%), and Amharic was spoken as a first language by 99.93%. The majority of the inhabitants practiced Ethiopian Orthodox Christianity, with 99.72% reporting that as their religion.
