= Kebedech Seyoum =

Ethiopian resistance leader (1911–1984)

- ከበደች ሥዩም
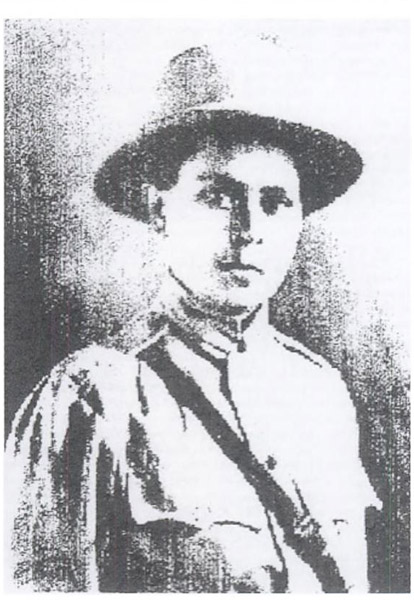
- Kebedech Seyoum in 1935
- Born: 1911; Mekelle, Ethiopian Empire
- Died: January 1984 (aged 72–73); Addis Ababa, Ethiopia
- Occupations: Resistance leader, military commander, social welfare activist
- Spouse: Aberra Kassa (m. 1922; died 1936)
- Children: 4
- Parent(s): Seyoum Mengesha (father); Gembere Berhe (mother)
- Relatives: Yohannes IV (great-grandfather)
- Military career
- Allegiance: Ethiopian Empire: Arbegnoch
- Known for: Leadership in the Ethiopian resistance against the Italian occupation

Woizero Kebedech Seyoum (Tigrinya: ከበደች ሥዩም, romanized: Käbbädäčč Śəyyum; 1911 – January 1984) was an Ethiopian noblewoman, military commander and social welfare activist. A daughter of Ras Seyoum Mengesha and a great-granddaughter of Emperor Yohannes IV, she became one of the women who assumed military leadership during the Ethiopian resistance movement against the Italian occupation of Ethiopia.

During the Second Italo-Ethiopian War, Kebedech initially organized supplies for the forces commanded by her husband, Dejazmach Aberra Kassa, and exercised authority in Selale during his absence. Following the defeat of the regular Ethiopian armies and Aberra's execution by the Italian authorities in December 1936, she took command of armed resistance forces in her own right. Her forces operated in Shewa and parts of western Ethiopia before she withdrew through the Sudan and eventually went into exile in Jerusalem.

== Early life and family ==
Kebedech was born in Mekelle in 1911. Her father was Ras Seyoum Mengesha, a member of the ruling family of Tigray, and her mother was Gembere Berhe. Through her father, Kebedech was a great-granddaughter of Emperor Yohannes IV, who had ruled Ethiopia from 1872 to 1889.

In May 1922 she married Dejazmach Aberra Kassa, a son of Ras Kassa Haile Darge. Aberra belonged to a prominent Shewan noble family and was the local ruler of Selale. The marriage thus linked Kebedech, a descendant of the Tigrayan branch of the Solomonic dynasty, with an important Shewan aristocratic family.

The couple had three sons, Amha, Amdä Seyon and Tariku, as well as a daughter who died at an early age. Their son Amha later became a diplomat and senior government official during the reign of Emperor Haile Selassie.

== Second Italo-Ethiopian War ==
=== Mobilization and administration in Selale ===
Kebedech's political and military activities began before the Italian occupation of Addis Ababa. When the Second Italo-Ethiopian War began in 1935, Aberra mobilized the forces of Selale and departed for the northern front. Kebedech organized women to prepare provisions for his soldiers.

According to historian Minale Adugna, Kebedech also represented her husband's governorship during his absence, maintaining order in Selale and carrying out propaganda intended to encourage resistance to Italian disarmament and political pressure. After Aberra returned from the northern front, she cared for wounded soldiers and helped reinforce his army with provisions and other supplies. She subsequently accompanied him during the unsuccessful Ethiopian campaign of July 1936 against Italian-held Addis Ababa.

Following the defeat of the Ethiopian regular forces, Kebedech also sheltered soldiers returning from the front at Fitche, including Emperor Haile Selassie and members of his entourage as they passed through the area. Aberra subsequently organized resistance in Selale, where his forces disrupted Italian communications between Shewa and Gojjam. Italian air and ground attacks forced Kebedech and her children to take refuge in the forests.

=== Execution of Aberra Kassa ===
Facing continuing Italian pressure, Aberra Kassa eventually considered surrender. Before doing so, he sent Kebedech to Adisge and later sent her a letter together with his weapons. According to material from Kebedech's archive cited by Adugna, Aberra explained that his decision to surrender was intended to prevent reprisals against his followers.

Although Aberra surrendered after receiving assurances that his life would be spared, he was executed on 21 December 1936, and his body was publicly displayed at Fitche. His death marked a turning point in Kebedech's life. As guardian of their children and a member of two politically prominent families through birth and marriage, she assumed an increasingly direct role in the resistance.

== Resistance commander ==
Following her husband's death, Kebedech took up arms and emerged as an independent resistance leader. The remaining soldiers of Aberra's force, members of her household and her children formed the nucleus around which her following developed. Adugna notes that her position within the Tigrayan royal house and her connection to the ruling family of Selale helped her mobilize supporters rapidly.

The Encyclopaedia Aethiopica describes Kebedech as an armed patriot chief who commanded an army of her own. She participated in engagements in Merhabete, Gindebarat, Wollega and Gojjam, on several occasions narrowly escaping capture or death. Adugna additionally records operations in Menz, Tegulet, Ifat, Selale and Merhabete. Kebedech maintained contact with other prominent resistance leaders and participated in joint operations with Ras Abebe Aregai, Dejazmach Zewde Asfaw and Shaleqa Mesfin Sileshi.

Kebedech's role went beyond providing logistical support to male commanders. Contemporary and later accounts describe her as personally directing troops in the field. She wore a khaki military uniform, rode at the head of her forces and issued orders to her soldiers. Bernardelli places her among the small number of Ethiopian women who attained the position of senior guerrilla commander during the occupation and describes her leadership as combining military command with a form of regency on behalf of her young children.

Adugna records that Kebedech was pregnant when she assumed command of her husband's forces. During the campaign she gave birth away from settled areas to her third son, Tariku. She soon afterwards continued westward with her soldiers towards Wollega, fighting on the route towards southern Gojjam. In a later recollection cited by Adugna, Kebedech stated that the presence of her eldest son strengthened her determination after the death of his father, and that her soldiers accepted her authority in much the same manner as that of male resistance commanders.

Her military career formed part of the wider Arbegnoch movement, which continued armed opposition to Italian rule after the collapse of Ethiopia's conventional armies in 1936. Her activities were concentrated principally in central and western Ethiopia and were often conducted in cooperation with other regional patriot forces.

== Withdrawal and exile ==
By 1938, continued military pressure made Kebedech's position increasingly difficult. According to the Encyclopaedia Aethiopica, in June 1938 she crossed into the Anglo-Egyptian Sudan together with a group of Shewan patriots that included Tekle Wolde Hawaryat and Mesfin Sileshi. From Roseires she travelled through Cairo and eventually settled with her children in Jerusalem.

Bernardelli likewise dates her withdrawal into Sudan to June 1938 and states that she subsequently remained in Jerusalem during the remainder of the Italian occupation. Minale Adugna gives a slightly different chronology, placing her departure for Sudan in 1939 after operations in southern Gojjam and stating that she returned to Ethiopia following the country's liberation in 1941. The Encyclopaedia Aethiopica, by contrast, dates her return to Ethiopia to 1943.

== Later life ==
After returning to Ethiopia, Kebedech became involved in social and welfare activities. Adugna states that she devoted herself particularly to assisting orphaned children and church institutions. Emperor Haile Selassie recognized her wartime service with several decorations, including the Patriots' Medal, the Exiles' Medal and the Victory Medal. She also received a state pension in recognition of her service, which continued until the 1974 revolution.

The fall of the imperial government and the establishment of the Derg affected Kebedech and her family directly. Much of her property was confiscated by the new government. Her son Amdä Seyon was executed, while her son Amha was imprisoned for eight years and later went into exile in the United Kingdom. Despite the confiscation of her property, Kebedech continued to participate in welfare activities.

Kebedech died in Addis Ababa in January 1984. Her funeral was held at the cemetery of Holy Trinity Cathedral, where a number of prominent Ethiopian patriots attended the ceremony.

== Historical significance ==
Kebedech has been discussed in scholarship on the participation of Ethiopian women in the war against Italy and the subsequent resistance. Her career is notable for the transition from the roles of administrator, organizer and supplier during the early stages of the conflict to direct command of an armed formation after the death of her husband.

The Encyclopaedia Aethiopica describes her as remaining in public memory as an example of the Ethiopian women who participated in the armed resistance. A dedicated biographical study, Meaza Heskyias's A Biography of Wayzaro Kabbadach Siyum (1911–1984), was completed at Addis Ababa University in 1992, while her military activities have also been discussed in studies of women guerrilla fighters and of the wider Ethiopian resistance.

Kebedech also entered literary representations of the resistance. The Ethiopian-Italian writer Gabriella Ghermandi included her as a historical figure in the novel Regina di fiori e di perle, in which memories of the resistance to the Italian occupation form a central part of the narrative. (Note: The novel is a work of fiction and should not be treated as a biographical source for Kebedech's life.)

== Family ==
Kebedech belonged by birth to the Tigrayan branch of the Ethiopian imperial family and by marriage to a prominent Shewan noble family. Her immediate family included:

- Father: Ras Seyoum Mengesha, grandson of Emperor Yohannes IV
- Mother: Gembere Berhe
- Great-grandfather: Emperor Yohannes IV
- Husband: Dejazmach Aberra Kassa, son of Ras Kassa Haile Darge
- Children:
  - Amha Aberra Kassa
  - Amdä Seyon Aberra Kassa
  - Tariku Aberra Kassa
  - an unnamed daughter who died in childhood

== See also ==
- Arbegnoch
- Second Italo-Ethiopian War
- Italian East Africa
- Abebe Aregai
- Seyoum Mengesha
- Aberra Kassa
- Women in Ethiopia
