= Were Ilu (woreda) =

District in Amhara Region, Ethiopia

Coordinates: 10°50′N 39°10′E

Were Ilu ወረ ኢሉ (ዋስል)
- Woreda and Town
- Flag
- Interactive map of Were Ilu
- Country: Ethiopia
- Region: Amhara
- Zone: Debub Wollo

Area
  - Total: 740.96 km^{2} (286.09 sq mi)

Population (2012 est.)
  - Total: 119,374
  - Density: 161.11/km^{2} (417.27/sq mi)

Were Ilu (Amharic: ወረ ኢሉ), is a woreda in Amhara Region, Ethiopia. Part of the Debub Wollo Zone, Were Ilu is bordered on the southwest by Jama, on the west by Legahida, on the northwest by Legambo, on the north by Dessie Zuria, on the east by the Abuko, and on the southeast by the Wanchet which separates it from the Semien Shewa Zone. Towns in Were Ilu include Kabe, Were Ilu and Weyin Amba; a historic landmark is Mekane Selassie, the site of a medieval church destroyed. The woreda of Legahida was separated from Were Ilu.

Were Ilu stretches over a number of the ridges and valleys on the southern side of the massif which includes Mount Amba Ferit. Elevations range from about 1700 meters above sea level at the confluence of the Wanchet with its tributary the Sawan at the woreda's southmost point to about 3200 meters on its northern border.

== History ==
The region's recorded history, in fact, goes back to the first decades of the second millennium. For example, St. George's Church in the town of Woreilu (whose Tabot is reputed to have been carried by Emperor Menelik at the Battle of Adwa) was established around 1200.

The parish of Mekane Selassie (መካነ ሥላሴ), near Neded and the home of the famous cathedral by the same name, served as a favorite royal playground. The construction of Mekane Selassie (meaning: the abode of the Trinity) was begun by Emperor Naod (1494–1508) and completed by his son Emperor Libna Dengel (royal nom-du-guerre, Wanag Seged).

Francisco Alvarez, who had earlier visited the church, confirms that its size was some 150 feet by 150 feet—wholly covered in gold leaf, inlaid with gems, pearls and corals

Astounded by the wealth and workmanship, the Yemeni chronicler of Ahmad ibn Ibrahim al-Ghazi notes: "The imam asked all the Arabs who were with him, ‘Is there the like of this church, with its images and its gold, in Byzantium, or in India, or in any other place?' They replied, ‘We never saw or heard of its like in Byzantium or India or anywhere in the world.

Abba Gregorius (1596–1658), the famous monk whose Jesuit association and global travels disseminated invaluable knowledge overseas about Ethiopia, is said to hail from Woreilu. In a 1650 letter to the German scholar Hiob Ludolf (1624–1704), the Ethiopologist deservedly known as the father of Ethiopian Studies, Abba Gregorius describes himself as follows: "As to my origins, do not imagine, my friend, that they are humble, for I am of the HOUSE of AMHARA which is a respected tribe; from it come the heads of the Ethiopian people, the governors, the military commanders, the judges and the advisers of the King of Ethiopia who appoint and dismiss, command and rule in the name of the King, his governors, and grandees. ”

== Demographics ==
A 2012 estimate puts the population at 119,374. This gives a population density of 161.11 people per square kilometer (417.27 people per square mile), given its area of 740.96 square kilometers (286.09 square miles), nearly identical to the South Wollo Zone average of 161.49 people per square kilometer (418.56 people per square mile).

Based on the 2007 national census conducted by the Central Statistical Agency of Ethiopia (CSA), this woreda has a total population of 109,244, an increase of -9.11% over the 1994 census, of whom 54,252 are men and 54,992 women; 11,434 or 10.47% are urban inhabitants. With an area of 740.96 square kilometers, Were Ilu has a population density of 147.44, which is roughly equal than the Zone average of 147.58 persons per square kilometer. A total of 25,212 households were counted in this woreda, resulting in an average of 4.33 persons to a household, and 24,216 housing units. The 1994 national census reported a total population for this woreda of 120,193 in 26,594 households, of whom 58,542 were men and 61,651 were women; 8,908 or 7.41% of its population were urban dwellers.

In 1994 the largest ethnic group reported in Were Ilu was the Amhara (97.6%), followed by the Oromo (2.4%). Amharic was spoken as a first language by 99.93%. The majority of the inhabitants were Muslim, with 80.04% of the population reported as practicing Islam, while 19.83% of the population said they professed Ethiopian Orthodox Christianity. This had changed by 2007, with 73.96% reporting Islam as their religion, while 25.77% of the population said they practiced Ethiopian Orthodox Christianity.
