= Borena, Ethiopia =

District in Amhara Region, Ethiopia

Coordinates: 10°55′N 38°30′E

Borena ቦረና
- Woreda
- Borena
- Flag
- Interactive map of Borena
- Country: Ethiopia
- Region: Amhara
- Zone: South Wollo

Area
  - Total: 1,027.61 km^{2} (396.76 sq mi)

Population (2012 est.)
  - Total: 171,686
  - Density: 114.52/km^{2} (296.6/sq mi)

Borena (Amharic: ቦረና) is a woreda in Amhara Region, Ethiopia. Formerly known as Debre Sina, this district lies in the western part of the Debub Wollo Zone. Borena is bordered on the south by Wegde, on the west by the Abbay River which separates it from the Misraq Gojjam Zone, on the north by Mehal Sayint, on the northeast by Sayint, and on the east by Legambo. The administrative center is Mekane Selam; other towns in Borena include Wobo Mikael.

The altitude of this woreda ranges from 500 meters above sea level at the bottom of the canyon of the Abay to 3200 meters in the northeast corner. Rivers include the Defarsa, Donqoto, Endras, Lagadaba, and Yashum. Forested areas include the Denkoro Forest, a forest remnant on the eastern side of Denkoro river gorge with an elevation stretching from 2,400 to 3,000 meters above sea level. The lowest portions are dominated by Podocarpus falcatus and Juniperus procera, which are replaced with Rapanea and Dombeya as the elevation rises, and are in turn replaced by Erica arborea and Hypericum revolutum midway up through the forest, and eventually dominate by the highest portion. Dombeya and Erica are both important for the cultivation of honey.

The southern part of this woreda was detached in summer 1994 to create Wegde woreda.

== History & Etymology ==
The historic Borena Wollo area encompasses the current Borena woreda, as well as the adjacent Wegde and Kelala woredas. Borena takes its name from the Tulama Oromo clans that conquered the region in the 16th century. These clans descended from the Borena moiety of Oromo, as opposed to the rest of Wollo Oromos who descended from the Barentuma; hence the region was named Borena. Prior to the Oromo migrations, this region was called Segla or Gasicha, as evidenced by historical texts and the monastery of Abba Giyorgis Ze-Gasicha in Kelala woreda. Prior to 1995, Borena and the neighboring Sayint region were administered together under the Borena & Sayint awrajja.

== Demographics ==
A 2012 estimate puts the population at 247,372. This gives a population density of 114.52 people per square kilometer (296.62 people per square mile), given its area of 1,027.61 square kilometers (866.78 square miles), much lower than the South Wollo Zone average of 161.49 people per square kilometer (418.56 people per square mile).

Based on the 2007 national census conducted by the Central Statistical Agency of Ethiopia (CSA), this woreda has a total population of 158,209, an increase of 26.44% over the 1994 census, of whom 78,621 are men and 79,588 women; 8,709 or 5.50% are urban inhabitants. With an area of 1,027.61 square kilometers, Debre Sina has a population density of 153.96, which is greater than the Zone average of 147.58 persons per square kilometer. A total of 37,193 households were counted in this woreda, resulting in an average of 4.25 persons per household, and 36,006 housing units.The 1994 national census reported a total population for this woreda of 125,126 in 28,461 households, of whom 62,036 were men and 63,090 were women; 5,509 or 4.4% of its population were urban dwellers.

In 1994 the two largest ethnic groups reported in Debre Sina were the Amhara (98.75%), and the Oromo (1.19%); all other ethnic groups made up 0.06% of the population. Amharic was spoken as a first language by 99.87%. The majority of the inhabitants professed Ethiopian Orthodox Christianity, with 57.79% having reported they practiced that belief, while 41.99% of the population said they were Muslim. This had shifted somewhat by 2007, with 55.52% reporting Ethiopian Orthodox Christianity as their religion, while 44.38% of the population were Muslim.
