= Menz Mam Midir =

District in Amhara Region, Ethiopia

Menz Mama መንዝ ማማ ምድር
- Woreda
- Flag
- Zone: Semien Shewa
- Region: Amhara Region

Area
  - Total: 650.42 km^{2} (251.13 sq mi)

Population (2012 est.)
  - Total: 92,658
  - Density: 142.46/km^{2} (368.97/sq mi)

Menz Mama Midir (Amharic: መንዝ ማማ ምድር) is one of the woredas in the Amhara Region of Ethiopia. It is named after the district of the former province of Menz, Mama Meder. Located at the eastern edge of the Ethiopian Highlands in the Semien Shewa Zone, Menz Mam Midir is bordered on the south by Mojana Wadera, on the west by Menz Lalo Midir, on the north by Menz Gera Midir, on the northeast by Efratana Gidim, on the east by Kewet, and on the southeast by Termaber. The administrative center of this woreda is Molale. Menz Mam Midir was part of the erstwhile Mam Midrina Lalo Midir woreda.

== Demographics ==
A 2012 estimate puts the population at 92,658. This gives a population density of 142.46 people per square kilometer (368.97 people per square mile), given its area of 650.42 square kilometers (251.13 square miles), higher than the North Shewa Zone average of 126.20 people per square kilometer (326.87 people per square mile).

Based on the 2007 national census conducted by the Central Statistical Agency of Ethiopia (CSA), this woreda has a total population of 85,129, of whom 42,102 are men and 43,027 women; 6,513 or 7.65% are urban inhabitants.

The majority of the inhabitants practiced Ethiopian Orthodox Christianity, with 99.67% reporting that as their religion.
