= Ensaro =

Coordinates: 9°50′N 39°00′E

Ensaro እንሳሮ
- Woreda
- Flag
- Interactive map of Ensaro
- Zone: Semien Shewa
- Region: Amhara Region

Area
  - Total: 442.10 km^{2} (170.70 sq mi)

Population (2012 est.)
  - Total: 63,154
  - Density: 142.85/km^{2} (369.98/sq mi)

Ensaro (Amharic: እንሳሮ) is a woreda in the Amhara Region, Ethiopia. Part of the Semien Shewa Zone, Ensaro is bordered on the south and west by the Oromia Region, on the north by the Jamma River which separates it from Merhabiete, on the northeast by Moretna Jiru, and on the east by Siyadebrina Wayu. Towns in Ensaro include Lemi.

This woreda was originally named Ensaro, which is the name used in the 1994 national census, and it was changed to Ensaro Wayu prior to the Ethiopian Agricultural Sample Survey in October 2001. Siyadebrina Wayu was split from Ensaro Wayu between 2004 and 2007.

== Demographics ==
A 2012 estimate puts the population at 63,154. This gives a population density of 142.85 people per square kilometer (369.98 people per square mile), given its area of 442.10 square kilometers (170.70 square miles), higher than the North Shewa Zone average of 126.20 people per square kilometer (326.87 people per square mile).

Based on the 2007 national census conducted by the Central Statistical Agency of Ethiopia (CSA), this woreda has a total population of 58,203, of whom 29,888 are men and 28,315 women; 3,164 or 5.44% are urban inhabitants. The 1994 national census reported a total population for this woreda of 122,473 in 24,069 households, of whom 62,057 were men and 60,416 were women; 5,464 or 4.46% of its population were urban dwellers.

The majority of the inhabitants practiced Ethiopian Orthodox Christianity, with 99.89% reporting that as their religion. This was largely unchanged from the 99.87% reported in 1994. The two largest ethnic groups reported in Ensaro were the Amhara (70.27%), and the Oromo (29.58%); all other ethnic groups made up 0.15% of the population. Amharic was spoken as a first language by 68.97%, and Oromiffa was spoken by 30.98%; the remaining 0.05% spoke all other primary languages reported.
