= Menz Gera Midir =

District in Amhara Region, Ethiopia

Menz Gera Midir መንዝ ጌራ ምድር
- Woreda
- Flag
- Zone: Semien Shewa
- Region: Amhara

Area
  - Total: 1,112.28 km^{2} (429.45 sq mi)

Population (2012 est.)
  - Total: 131,403
  - Density: 118.14/km^{2} (305.98/sq mi)

Menz Gera Midir (Amharic: መንዝ ጌራ ምድር) is one of the woredas in the Amhara Region of Ethiopia. It is partly named after the northern district of the former province of Menz, Gera Meder. Located at the eastern edge of the Ethiopian Highlands in the Semien Shewa Zone, Menz Gera Midir is bordered on the south by Menz Lalo Midir, on the southwest by Menz Keya Gebreal, on the west by the Qechene River which separates it from the Debub Wollo Zone, on the north by Gishe, on the northeast by Antsokiyana Gemza, and on the east by Efratana Gidim. The administrative center of this woreda is Mehal Meda. Menz Gera Midir was part of former Gera Midirna Keya Gebriel woreda.

== Demographics ==
A 2012 estimate puts the population at 131,403. This gives a population density of 118.14 people per square kilometer (305.98 people per square mile), given its area of 1,112.28 square kilometers (429.45 square miles), lower than the North Shewa Zone average of 126.20 people per square kilometer (326.87 people per square mile).

Based on the 2007 national census conducted by the Central Statistical Agency of Ethiopia (CSA), this woreda has a total population of 120,469, of whom 58,827 are men and 61,642 women; 11,055 or 9.18% are urban inhabitants.

The majority of the inhabitants practiced Ethiopian Orthodox Christianity, with 99.56% reporting that as their religion.

== Park (Community Conservation Area) ==
The Guassa Community Conservation Area (GCCA) is one of the oldest known common property resource management in Sub-Saharan Africa. It has been the focus of an indigenous natural resource management institution, known as “Qero,” system for over 400 years. The conservation area is located 80 km off the main highway and is home to numerous endemic birds and wildlife species, including the iconic Ethiopian wolf and the Ethiopian Gelada. Its name comes from the high altitude Afro-alpine Festuca grassland, or Guassa grass.

Covering 11,000 hectares, GCCA lies at a latitude of 10° 15′ – 10° 27′ N and longitude of 39° 45′ – 39° 49′ E in the Menz Gera Midir woreda. The Guassa area ranges in altitude from 3,200 to 3,700 meters above sea level. The rugged mountain plateau forms the watershed between the Nile and Awash River systems, thus performing an important hydrological function and catchment area. The eastern edge of the Guassa Area falls away abruptly as cliffs drop into the Great Rift Valley.

The Guassa Area originated as a community-based natural resource management system known as “Qero” over 400 years ago. The Qero system, based on the Atsme Irist tenure system, was organized by two formally elected chiefs from families descended from Gera and Asbo. These chiefs ensure an equitable distribution of resources and enforce the bylaws protecting the common property. Further organization of the user community into parishes gave the Guassa area the status of consecrated land, under the protective patronage of the parish, which reinforced the Qero system with the prestige, power, and authority of another important local level institution. Following the 1974 Ethiopian Revolution, the government nationalized all rural land in the country, and disbanded all local-level land tenure and common property management institutions. This agrarian reform destroyed the Qero system and the Guassa area was turned into an open-access resource, which led to an extreme decline of native flora in the area.

Upon the fall of the Derg regime, local peasant associations (kebeles) organized a land management system, called the Guassa Conservation Council Committee, with a new management system and online bylaws adapted to the current sociopolitical order of the country. The new system consists of nine peasant associations that elect five representatives, each of whom are descendants of Gera and Asbo. Under their care, the area of the GCCA recovered; locals were surprised at how the native species recovered. Five kinds of silvery shrub called “nachillo” (Helichrysum spp.) had always existed in Guassa, but now they seemed to be more widespread than anyone remembered.
