= Mesfin Sileshi =

Ethiopian politician (1905–1974)

Ras Mesfin Sileshi
- መስፍን ስለሺ
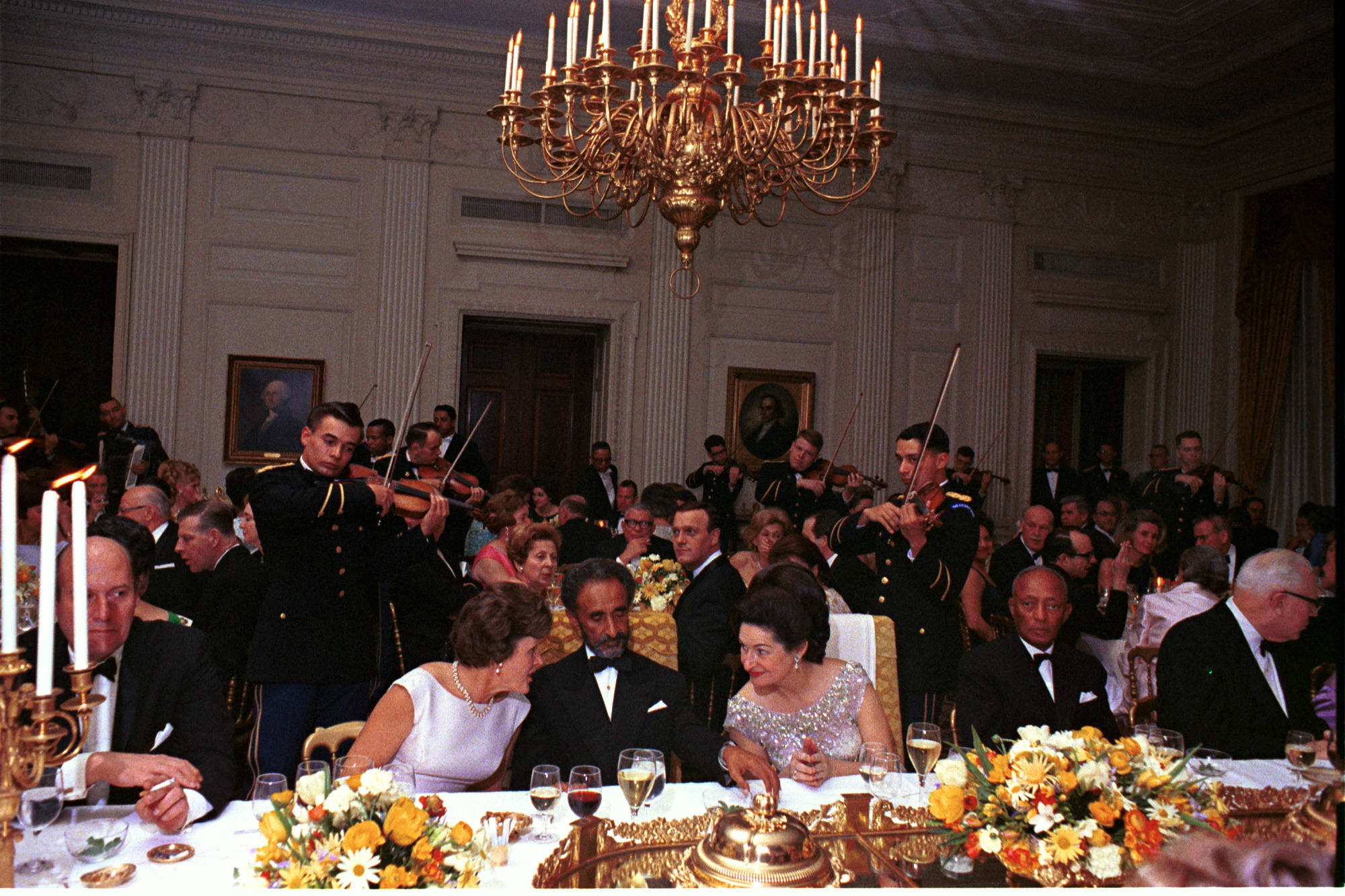
- Mesfin Sileshi (second from the right) during the state visit of Haile Selassie to the White House, 14 February 1967

Vice-Governor-General of Shewa
- In office March 1957 – 18 February 1961

Minister of Interior
- In office 1955 – March 1957
- Monarch: Haile Selassie

Personal details
- Born: 5 July 1902 Addisge, Shewa, Ethiopian Empire
- Died: 23 November 1974 (aged 72) Addis Ababa, Ethiopia
- Cause of death: Execution by firing squad (see Massacre of the Sixty)
- Spouse: Weizero Yeshimebet Guma

Military service
- Branch/service: Army of the Ethiopian Empire
- Rank: Major general
- Commands: Minister of Interior

Ras Mesfin Sileshi (Amharic: መስፍን ስለሺ; 5 July 1902 – 23 November 1974) was an Ethiopian resistance fighter and politician.

== Biography ==
He was born in 1902 in Addisge, Shewa to a Shewan Amhara noble family. His father was Dejazmach Sileshi Woldesemayat and his mother was Woyzero Askale Garedew. His brother was Dejazmach Bezabeh Sileshi. After receiving a church education, Mesfin began his military career in 1934 by joining the first modern Imperial Bodyguard battalion. At the outbreak of the Italian invasion in 1935, he was a major in the Ethiopian Army and fought at the Battle of Maychew.

After the Italians took Addis Ababa in May 1936, Mesfin left for Moretna Jiru in northern Shewa, where he organized a rebel force against the Italian occupation. Together with his cousin Aberra Kassa, he participated in the failed July 1936 attempt to liberate Addis Ababa. Along with other Shewan patriots, he unsuccessfully attempted to create a coordinating body for the resistance. As a patriot leader he operated in Selale, Merhabete, Tegulat, Wollega, and Gojjam. In March 1938 he took part in the heavily fought Battle of Fageta, where the Gojjam patriots achieved a notable victory. The first phase of his career as a resistance fighter ended in June 1938 when he crossed the border into Sudan, together with Aberra Kassa's widow Kebedech Seyoum and several other patriots.

While in exile, Mesfin actively promoted the Ethiopian struggle for liberation. He established contact with Haile Selassie in Great Britain, moved between Cairo and Khartoum, and helped strengthen cooperation between patriots and exiles. Acting as an imperial messenger, he re-entered Ethiopia carrying a radio and arms together with foreign anti-fascist agents such as Paul Langlois, encouraging the patriots with promises of the emperor's return and the imminent liberation of the country.

In 1940, when William Platt asked patriot leaders in north-western Ethiopia to ally with Britain against Italy, Mesfin escorted a mule caravan led by Mengesha Jembere and Negash Bezabih to Al Qadarif to obtain arms and ammunition. He re-entered Ethiopia with Haile Selassie in 1941 and played an active role in the liberation campaign. He later led a series of raids that resulted in the capture of Gore and helped liberate south-western Ethiopia from Italian occupation.

After liberation, he was appointed Governor-General of Illubabor from 1942 to 1946 and then of Kaffa from 1946 to 1955. During his tenure in Kaffa he encouraged aristocrats and the merchants to adopt modern coffee planting methods, and he had a special interest in coffee planting himself. He was briefly Mayor of Addis Ababa in 1947. In 1955 he joined the cabinet as Minister of Interior, serving until 1957, when he was appointed Vice-Governor-General of Shewa.

Ras Mesfin was considered enormously wealthy. He was head of the Patriots' Association, the national association of veterans of the resistance and a fiercely pro-monarchy group.

After the Ethiopian Revolution, he was arrested by the Derg in August 1974 during the "creeping coup" and was among those summarily executed in the Massacre of the Sixty.
