= Lemi, Ethiopia =

Town in Ethiopia

Coordinates: 9.802°N 38.899°E

Lemi is a town in central Ethiopia, located in the North Shewa Zone of the Amhara Region, about 125 kilometers north of Addis Ababa on the paved way to Alem Ketema. Its 1994 population was 2,789. Lemi is a capital of Ensaro wereda. Lemi was founded by ras Andarge. The main Lemi economy is agriculture and trade.

About 70% of Lemi's rainfall occurs in July and August each year, with the rest of the year being largely dry.
