= Mojana Wadera =

District in Amhara Region, Ethiopia

Mojana Wedera ሞጃና ወደራ
- Woreda
- Flag
- Interactive map of Mojana Wedera
- Coordinates: 9°58′N 39°38′E
- Country: Semien Shewa
- Region: Amhara

Area
  - Total: 618.35 km^{2} (238.75 sq mi)

Population (2012 est.)
  - Total: 75,394
  - Density: 121.93/km^{2} (315.79/sq mi)

Mojana Wedera (Amharic: ሞጃና ወደራ ) is one of the woredas in the Amhara Region of Ethiopia. Part of the Semien Shewa Zone, Mojana Wadera is bordered on the south by Basona Werana, on the northeast by Menz Lalo Midir, on the north by Menz Mama Midir, and on the east by Termaber. The administrative center of this woreda is Sela Dingay. Mojana Wadera was separated from Termaber woreda.

== Demographics ==
A 2012 estimate puts the population at 75,394. This gives a population density of 121.93 people per square kilometer (315.79 people per square mile), given its area of 618.35 square kilometers (238.75 square miles), lower than the North Shewa Zone average of 126.20 people per square kilometer (326.87 people per square mile).

Based on the 2007 national census conducted by the Central Statistical Agency of Ethiopia (CSA), this woreda has a total population of 69,667, of whom 35,186 are men and 34,481 women; 2,477 or 3.56% are urban inhabitants.

The majority of the inhabitants practiced Ethiopian Orthodox Christianity, with 99.87% reporting that as their religion.
