= Menz Keya Gebreal =

Menz Keya Gabreal መንዝ ቀያ ጋሪኤል
- Woreda
- Flag
- Zone: Semien Shewa
- Region: Amhara Region

Area
  - Total: 544.54 km^{2} (210.25 sq mi)

Population (2012 est.)
  - Total: 50,168
  - Density: 92.13/km^{2} (238.61/sq mi)

Menz Keya Gebreal (Amharic: መንዝ ቀያ ጋሪኤል) is a district (woreda) in the Amhara Region of Ethiopia. Located in the Semien Shewa Zone, Menz Keya Gebreal is bordered on the southeast by Menz Lalo Midir, on the southwest by the Jamma River which separated it from Moretna Jiru, on the west by Merhabiete, on the northwest by the Qechene River which separates it from the Debub Wollo Zone, and on the northeast by Menz Gera Midir. The administrative center of this woreda is Zemero. Menz Keya Gebreal was part of the former Gera Midirna Keya Gebriel woreda.

== Demographics ==
A 2012 estimate puts the population at 50,168. This gives a population density of 92.13 people per square kilometer (238.61 people per square mile), given its area of 544.54 square kilometers (210.25 square miles), lower than the North Shewa Zone average of 126.20 people per square kilometer (326.87 people per square mile).

Based on the 2007 national census conducted by the Central Statistical Agency of Ethiopia (CSA), this woreda has a total population of 46,219, of whom 22,965 are men and 23,254 women; 2,623 or 5.68% are urban inhabitants.

The majority of the inhabitants practiced Ethiopian Orthodox Christianity, with 99.64% reporting that as their religion.
