= Jama (woreda) =

Coordinates: 10°40′N 39°10′E

- Woreda
- Flag
- Interactive map of Jama
- Country: Ethiopia
- Region: Amhara
- Zone: Debub Wollo

Area
  - Total: 1,051.93 km^{2} (406.15 sq mi)

Population (2012 est.)
  - Total: 137,544
  - Density: 130.75/km^{2} (338.65/sq mi)

Jama (Amharic: ጃማ) is one of the woredas in the Amhara Region of Ethiopia. Part of the Debub Wollo Zone, Jama is bordered on the southeast by the Qechene River which separates it from the Semien Shewa Zone, on the west by Kelala, on the north by Legahida, and on the northeast by Were Ilu. Towns in Jama include Dagolo, Faj, and Shul Afaf.

== Demographics ==
A 2012 estimate puts the population at 137,544. This gives a population density of 130.75 people per square kilometer (338.65 people per square mile), given its area of 1,051.93 square kilometers (406.15 square miles), lower than the South Wollo Zone average of 161.49 people per square kilometer (418.56 people per square mile).

Based on the 2007 national census conducted by the Central Statistical Agency of Ethiopia (CSA), this woreda has a total population of 126,879, an increase of 18.18% over the 1994 census, of whom 63,166 are men and 63,713 women; 6,048 or 4.77% are urban inhabitants. With an area of 1,051.93 square kilometers, Jama has a population density of 120.62, which is less than the Zone average of 147.58 persons per square kilometer. A total of 28,919 households were counted in this woreda, resulting in an average of 4.39 persons to a household, and 27,653 housing units. The 1994 national census reported a total population for this woreda of 107,365 in 24,217 households, of whom 53,266 were men and 54,099 were women; 3,710 or 3.46% of its population were urban dwellers.

In 1994 the largest ethnic group reported in Jama was the Amhara (99.94%). Amharic was spoken as a first language by 99.95%. The majority of the inhabitants professed Ethiopian Orthodox Christianity, with 57.39% of the population reported as practicing that belief, while 42.48% of the population said they were Muslim. This had shifted by 2007, with 54.69% reporting Ethiopian Orthodox Christianity as their religion, while 45.1% of the population were Muslim.
