= Mekdela =

District in Amhara Region, Ethiopia

Coordinates: 11°30′N 38°45′E

Mekdela መቅደላ
- Woreda
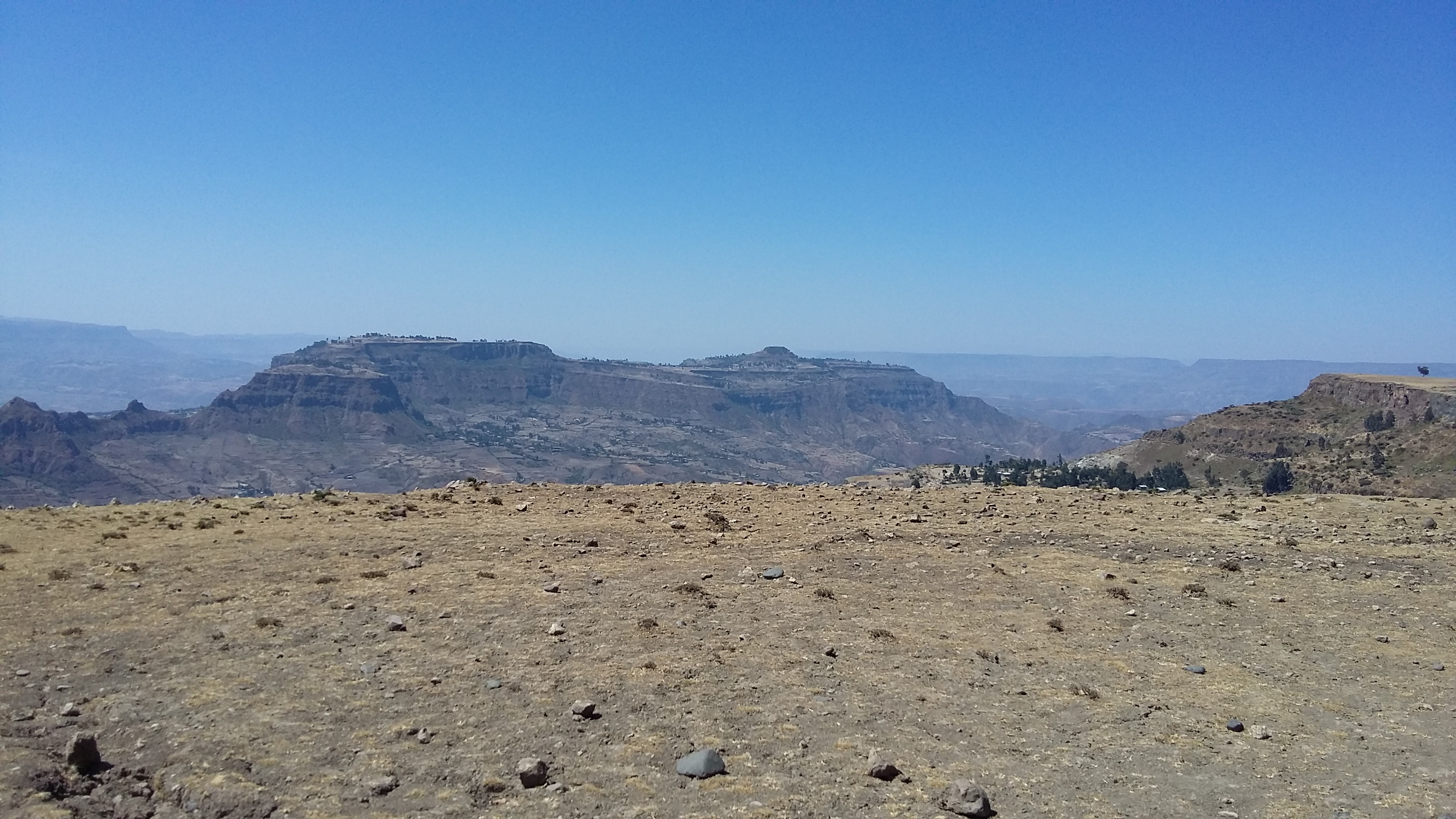

- Flag
- Interactive map of Mekdela
- Country: Ethiopia
- Region: Amhara
- Zone: South Wollo

Area
  - Total: 1,491.38 km^{2} (575.83 sq mi)

Population (2012 est.)
  - Total: 154,389
  - Density: 103.52/km^{2} (268.12/sq mi)

Mekdela (Amharic: መቅደላ) is a woreda in Amhara Region, Ethiopia. Part of the Wollo, Mekdela is bordered on the southwest by the Walo Shabatala River which separates it from Sayint, on the west by Semien Gondar Zone, on the north by the Bashilo River which separates it from the Semien Wollo Zone, and on the east by Tenta. The major town in Mekdelais Masha.

Elevations in this woreda range from 700 meters above sea level where the Bashilo leaves it to 3600 meters at its southeastern point on the upper slopes of Mount Amba Ferit,

== Demographics ==
A 2012 estimate puts the population at 154,389. This gives a population density of 103.52 people per square kilometer (268.12 people per square mile), given its area of 1,491.38 square kilometers (575.83 square miles), much lower than the South Wollo Zone average of 161.49 people per square kilometer (418.56 people per square mile).

Based on the 2007 national census conducted by the Central Statistical Agency of Ethiopia (CSA), this woreda has a total population of 142,654, an increase of 34.03% over the 1994 census, of whom 69,626 are men and 73,028 women; 5,115 or 3.59% are urban inhabitants. With an area of 1,491.38 square kilometers, Mekdela has a population density of 95.65, which is less than the Zone average of 147.58 persons per square kilometer. A total of 35,041 households were counted in this woreda, resulting in an average of 4.07 persons to a household, and 33,622 housing units.The 1994 national census reported a total population for this woreda of 106,435 in 25,813 households, of whom 52,567 were men and 53,868 were women; 2,037 or 1.91% of its population were urban dwellers.

In 1994, the largest ethnic group reported in Mekdela was the Amhara (99.96%). Amharic was spoken as a first language by 99.94%. The majority of the inhabitants were Muslim, with 71.83% of the population reported as practicing that belief, while 28.04% of the population said they professed Ethiopian Orthodox Christianity. This had changed little by 2007, with 70.94% reporting Islam as their religion, while 28.88% of the population said they practiced Ethiopian Orthodox Christianity.
