= Shewanesh Abraha =

Ethiopian resistance leader (1900/1901–1968)

- ሸዋነሽ አብርሃ
- Woizero Shewanesh Abraha with an aide behind two Breda 30 light machine guns
- Born: 1900 or 1901 near Mekelle, Tigray Province, Ethiopian Empire
- Died: July 1968; Addis Ababa, Ethiopian Empire
- Occupations: Resistance leader, guerrilla commander
- Spouse: Hailu Kebede
- Children: Wäsän Hailu; Zewditu Hailu
- Father: Abraha Araya
- Military career
- Allegiance: Ethiopian Empire: Arbegnoch
- Rank: Commander
- Known for: Leadership in the Arbegnoch resistance during the Italian occupation of Ethiopia

Woizero Shewanesh Abraha (Tigrinya: ሸዋነሽ አብርሃ, romanized: Šäwanäš Abrǝha; also transliterated Shewanesh Abreha; 1900 or 1901 – July 1968), was an Ethiopian resistance leader and guerrilla commander during the Italian occupation of Ethiopia. Born into a prominent Tigrayan noble family related to Emperor Yohannes IV, she married Dejazmach Hailu Kebede, a leading figure of the resistance in Wag. After Hailu's death fighting Italian forces in 1937, Shewanesh assumed the leadership of his surviving followers and continued armed resistance until the liberation of Ethiopia in 1941.

Operating principally in Wag, Lasta and neighbouring areas, Shewanesh became one of the women to attain a senior politico-military position within the Ethiopian guerrilla movement. Historian Francesco Bernardelli describes her as belonging to a small group of women who reached the position of commander-in-chief among resistance forces. She remained an active guerrilla commander from 1937 until 1941, directing attacks on Italian convoys and military positions and participating in the final campaign that ended Italian rule.

== Early life and family ==
Shewanesh was born in 1900 or 1901 near Mekelle in Tigray Province. Her father was Dejazmach Abraha Araya (1873–1917), a member of the ruling aristocracy of Tigray. Abraha had been sent to Italy in 1888, where he studied public administration, and returned to Ethiopia shortly after the Battle of Adwa. His descent from the ruling family of Tigray and his education later contributed to his rise within the imperial administration.

In 1902, Abraha was appointed governor of extensive territories in eastern and southern Tigray, including Enderta, Tembien, Kilete Awlalo and Raya Azebo. He also played a significant role in the political struggles of Tigray during the reign of Menelik II.

Abraha Araya was the son of Ras Araya Selassie Demsu, who was a maternal uncle of Emperor Yohannes IV. Shewanesh therefore belonged to the extended family of Yohannes IV through her paternal lineage.

Shewanesh married Dejazmach Hailu Kebede (1893/94–1937), a son of Wag Shum Kebede Tafari and a member of the ruling family of Wag. On his mother's side, Hailu descended from Ras Aligaz of Yejju. He spent part of his early career at the court of Ras Tafari Makonnen, the future Emperor Haile Selassie, and became a member of the Ethiopian Senate in 1931.

Known children of Shewanesh and Hailu included Wäsän Hailu, later Wag Shum of Wag, and Zewditu Hailu. The Encyclopaedia Aethiopica also identifies Dejazmach Taffärä Täsämma as one of Shewanesh's sons-in-law.

== Second Italo-Ethiopian War and Resistance leadership ==
=== Death of Hailu Kebede and assumption of command ===
Following the Battle of Maychew on 31 March 1936 and the collapse of the main Ethiopian armies, Hailu withdrew to the countryside and continued resistance to Italian rule. He subsequently organized one of the earliest armed resistance movements in the region, establishing his headquarters in the Täkkäze valley around Dähna in Wag. According to the Encyclopaedia Aethiopica, Italian authorities came to regard him as their strongest opponent in the area.

In September 1937, Italian forces organized a major offensive against his movement, bringing troops from Tigray, Lasta and Korem. On 22 September, Hailu's forces were defeated at Walah, near Säqota. He was wounded and died soon afterwards.

The Italian authorities transported Hailu's body to Säqota, mutilated it and displayed his head on a pole at Säqota and Korem for three days as a warning to the population and to other resistance leaders.

Despite the defeat, the surviving patriots of Wag did not disperse permanently. They rallied under Shewanesh's leadership, crossed the Täkkäze River and moved to Qwalisa in Begemder, where they continued resistance against the occupation.

Bernardelli places Shewanesh's assumption of command within a broader pattern during the occupation in which women related to deceased or absent resistance leaders could inherit significant political and military authority. He describes Shewanesh as having taken over the politico-military position left vacant by her husband's death.

Bernardelli also describes Shewanesh as exercising a form of regency on behalf of her son Wäsän Hailu while simultaneously holding effective command of the resistance forces associated with her family.

=== Guerrilla command, 1937–1941 ===
Shewanesh remained active as a resistance commander between 1937 and 1941. Bernardelli identifies her, together with other prominent female resistance leaders such as Shewareged Gedle and Kebedech Seyoum, among the women who attained senior politico-military command within the guerrilla movement.

According to Bernardelli, Shewanesh operated over a broad region including Wag, Lasta and Masa. The mountainous geography of the region, including the Maze valley and areas adjoining the Simien Mountains, provided conditions favourable to guerrilla warfare.

Forces associated with her command attacked Italian military convoys, disrupted the movement of reinforcements intended for Italian positions, cut communications and carried out surprise attacks against forts and military encampments.

Her role therefore went beyond preserving the remnants of her husband's military following. She maintained an armed organization for several years and participated in continuing efforts to prevent Italian authorities from consolidating control over the region.

Bernardelli states that her reputation among resistance fighters grew considerably during the occupation and describes her as acquiring an almost legendary status among the Ethiopian patriots.

=== Relations with other resistance leaders ===
From her base in Begemder, Shewanesh established contacts with other resistance leaders in the province in an effort to coordinate military activity against the Italian forces.

Her movement received support from members of her family and political network. Among them was her son-in-law, Dejazmach Taffärä Täsämma. Her son Wäsän Hailu also later joined her and became an important collaborator.

Relations between the various patriot leaders were nevertheless not always cooperative. The Encyclopaedia Aethiopica states that Shewanesh's activities were at times hindered by rivalry and disputes with other resistance leaders over access to provisions and firearms.

These conflicts reflected the decentralized nature of much of the Ethiopian resistance, whose commanders frequently had to secure their own supplies, weapons and local support.

=== Wäsän Hailu and the Italian administration ===
Wäsän Hailu, born around 1915 or 1916 at Korem in Wag, initially submitted to the Italian authorities after the defeat of his father's forces. The Italians appointed him governor of Dähna woreda.

Bernardelli interprets the appointment as part of an Italian attempt to weaken Shewanesh's resistance by using her son as an intermediary and by incorporating members of the local ruling family into the colonial administration.

The strategy did not secure Wäsän's long-term loyalty. In 1938 he abandoned the Italian administration and joined his mother at Qwalisa in Begemder.

Thereafter Wäsän assisted Shewanesh and other resistance leaders in consolidating operations against Italian positions. His defection strengthened the familial and political network around Shewanesh and reunited surviving elements of Hailu Kebede's resistance movement.

=== Alliance with Yohannes Iyasu ===
Shewanesh also used marriage alliances to strengthen her political and military position. She arranged the marriage of her daughter Zewditu Hailu to Lij Yohannes Iyasu, a son of the deposed Ethiopian ruler Lij Iyasu.

Yohannes Iyasu was himself active as a patriot leader in Begemder. The Encyclopaedia Aethiopica explicitly states that Shewanesh arranged the marriage in order to strengthen her forces.

A later study by Tesfaw Abebaw Ejigu likewise identifies the marriage alliance as an important means by which Shewanesh expanded the military support available to her.

The alliance connected Shewanesh's family and the ruling house of Wag with a branch of the former imperial family associated with Lij Iyasu, while also providing links with resistance forces active in Begemder.

== Liberation campaign of 1941 ==
The military situation changed decisively after Italy entered World War II and British and Allied forces launched the East African campaign against Italian East Africa.

Emperor Haile Selassie re-entered Ethiopia from the Sudanese frontier in January 1941 and advanced through Gojjam. When news of the emperor's return reached Shewanesh, she sent Wäsän Hailu to meet him while she continued mobilizing her forces for the liberation of Wag.

The patriots of Wag, supported by Ras Seyoum Mengesha of Tigray, occupied Säqota on 28 April 1941.

Shewanesh's forces subsequently participated in the Battle of Amba Alagi against Italian forces under Prince Amedeo, Duke of Aosta, the Viceroy of Italian East Africa.

The Italian position at Amba Alagi surrendered in May 1941, contributing to the collapse of Italian rule in most of Ethiopia. Bernardelli records Shewanesh as remaining active in the resistance through the final phase of the occupation.

== Recognition and later life ==
Following the restoration of Ethiopian rule, Shewanesh received several medals in recognition of her leadership and bravery during the resistance.

Her son Wäsän Hailu was appointed colonel in 1941 and confirmed as Wag Shum over Wag. He later opposed the administrative incorporation of Wag under the authority of the governor of Wollo and appealed unsuccessfully to Emperor Haile Selassie against the change.

Wäsän subsequently held a number of diplomatic and political positions. He was appointed Ethiopian ambassador to Greece in 1951 and ambassador to Jordan in 1967. In 1957 he became president of the Chamber of Deputies and later served as an adviser in the Senate. In 1971 he became a member of the Imperial Crown Council.

Published sources provide comparatively little information about Shewanesh's own activities after the liberation.

Shewanesh died in July 1968 in Addis Ababa. The biographical entry in the Encyclopaedia Aethiopica cites an issue of Addis Zämän dated 20 July 1968 among the contemporary sources for her life.

== Legacy and historiography ==
Shewanesh is one of several Ethiopian women whose direct participation in the anti-Italian resistance has been discussed in scholarship on women and warfare in Ethiopia.

Tsehai Berhane Selassie's study "Women Guerilla Fighters" discusses female participation in the resistance and is among the principal works cited in the Encyclopaedia Aethiopica entry on Shewanesh.

Salome Gabre Egziabher's study of the Ethiopian patriots likewise includes Shewanesh within its discussion of resistance to the Italian occupation.

Minale Adugna's study of women and warfare in Ethiopia examines the various roles played by Ethiopian women during the Italo-Ethiopian conflict, including their participation in mobilization, logistical support, intelligence and direct military resistance.

The Encyclopaedia Aethiopica gives Shewanesh a separate biographical entry and classifies her among Ethiopia's female patriots. It emphasizes her succession to Hailu Kebede's command, her relocation to Begemder, her attempts to coordinate resistance forces, her political alliances and her participation in the liberation campaign of 1941.

Bernardelli's study gives particular attention to the military authority attained by women during the occupation. He identifies Shewanesh as one of the women who reached a senior command position and emphasizes the continuity of her guerrilla activity from 1937 until 1941.

A 2024 study by Tesfaw Abebaw Ejigu similarly cites Shewanesh as a prominent female guerrilla fighter and highlights both her assumption of leadership after Hailu's death and her use of the marriage between Zewditu Hailu and Yohannes Iyasu to strengthen her forces.

== See also ==
- Arbegnoch
- Hailu Kebede
- Kebedech Seyoum
- Shewareged Gedle
- Second Italo-Ethiopian War
- Italian occupation of Ethiopia
- East African campaign (World War II)
- Women in Ethiopia
