= Tenta (woreda) =

District in Amhara Region, Ethiopia

Coordinates: 11°20′N 39°05′E

Tenta ተንታ
- Woreda
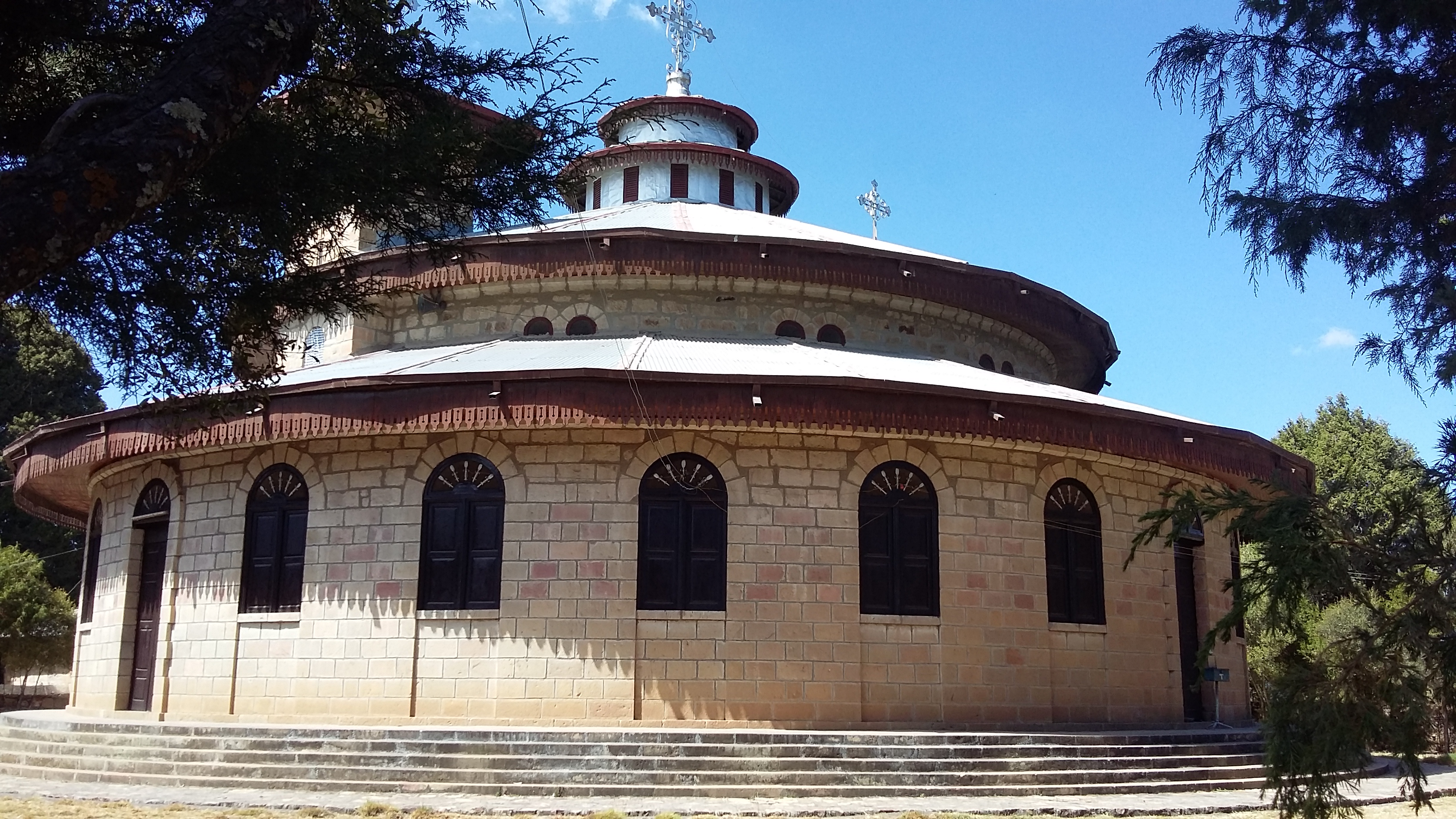

- Flag
- Interactive map of Tenta
- Country: Ethiopia
- Region: Amhara
- Zone: South Wollo

Area
  - Total: 1,316.34 km^{2} (508.24 sq mi)

Population (2012 est.)
  - Total: 180,373
  - Density: 137.03/km^{2} (354.9/sq mi)

Tenta (Amharic: ተንታ) is a woreda in Amhara Region, Ethiopia. Part of the Debub Wollo Zone, Tenta is bordered on the south by Legambo, on the southwest by Sayint, on the west by Magdala, on the north by the Bashilo River which separates it from Semien Wollo Zone, on the northeast by Ambassel, on the east by Kutaber and on the southeast by Dessie Zuria. The administrative center of this woreda is Ajebar; other towns in Tenta include Amba Mariam (the site of Emperor Tewodros's last stand), and Tenta.

Tenta lies the northern slopes of Mount Amba Ferit, stretching down to the left bank of the Bashilo. Altitudes range from 600 meters above sea level where the Bashilo leaves the woreda to 3700 meters in the southwest corner. Rivers include the Adala and the Kulkul, which drain into the Bashilo.

== Demographics ==
A 2012 estimate puts the population at 180,373. This gives a population density of 137.03 people per square kilometer (354.90 people per square mile), given its area of 1,316.34 square kilometers (508.24 square miles), lower than the South Wollo Zone average of 161.49 people per square kilometer (418.56 people per square mile).

Based on the 2007 national census conducted by the Central Statistical Agency of Ethiopia (CSA), this woreda has a total population of 166,239, an increase of 20.98% over the 1994 census, of whom 81,938 are men and 84,301 women; 8,978 or 5.40% are urban inhabitants. With an area of 1,316.34 square kilometers, Tenta has a population density of 126.29, which is less than the Zone average of 147.58 persons per square kilometer. A total of 40,279 households were counted in this woreda, resulting in an average of 4.13 persons to a household, and 38,875 housing units. The 1994 national census reported a total population for this woreda of 137,412 in 32,244 households, of whom 68,053 were men and 69,359 were women; 6,520 or 4.74% of its population were urban dwellers.

In 1994 the largest ethnic group reported in Tenta was the Amhara (99.93%). Amharic was spoken as a first language by 99.93%. The majority of the inhabitants were Muslim, with 77.92% of the population reported as practicing that belief, while 21.95% of the population said they professed Ethiopian Orthodox Christianity. This had changed somewhat by 2007, with 80.21% reporting Islam as their religion, while 19.58% of the population said they practiced Ethiopian Orthodox Christianity.
