= Tenta =

- Town
- Location within Ethiopia
- Coordinates: 11°19′N 39°15′E
- Country: Ethiopia
- Region: Amhara
- Zone: Semien (North) Shewa
- Elevation: 2,972 m (9,751 ft)

Population (2005)
  - Total: 4,022
- Time zone: UTC+3 (EAT)

Tenta is a town in northern Ethiopia. Located in the Debub Wollo Zone of the Amhara Region, Tenta has a latitude and longitude of 11°19′N 39°15′E with an elevation of 2,972 meters (9,751 ft) above sea level. It is one of three towns in Tenta woreda.

A notable landmark in this town is the church dedicated to St. Michael, which was constructed at the patronage of Negus Mikael around 1899, who made this town his headquarters. It is unusual for having three altars: one dedicated to St. Michael, another to St. Tekle Haymanot, and the third to the Holy Trinity. Three different masses are said to be celebrated simultaneously in this church. In a nearby mausoleum Negus Mikael is buried with his second wife Zennebech and two sons by his first wife, Ali and Desta.

== History ==
The missionary Johann Ludwig Krapf visited Tenta 22 March 1842, when it was the residence of Imam Liban of the Were Himano, a "House" or a sub-group of the Wollo Oromo. The settlement was surrounded by a ditch and wall, with a single entrance for security. As for the size of Tenta, Krapf states it was "a small village, containing about 600 inhabitants. A market is held here every week, and many articles are brought for sale."

Tenta is also the birthplace of the unlucky Emperor Iyasu V, the son of Negus Mikael, who was born there 4 February 1895 or 1896. A Swedish missionary who visited Tenta in the early 1930s found the settlement to be a strange little "king's town" surrounded by meter-high stone walls in three curves inside each other. On one side having a steep rock face, no wall was necessary.

The settlement had an Italian garrison until 19 May 1941 when it surrendered to Colonel Anderson, but in its final months it was under siege by arbegnoch fighters.

Tenta was subjected to an air attack during the Ethiopian Civil War in November 1989 but escaped fatalities; however, in a second air attack on 4 January 1990, two were killed.

== Demographics ==
Based on figures from the Central Statistical Agency in 2005, Tenta has an estimated total population of 4,022 of whom 1,996 are men and 2,206 are women. The 1994 census reported this town had a total population of 2,320 of whom 1,050 were men and 1,270 were women.
