= Mida Woremo =

Coordinates: 10°20′N 38°50′E

Mida Weremo ሚዳ ወረሞ
- Woreda
- Flag
- Interactive map of Mida Weremo
- Zone: Semien Shewa
- Region: Amhara Region

Area
  - Total: 836.81 km^{2} (323.09 sq mi)

Population (2012 est.)
  - Total: 102,000
  - Density: 122/km^{2} (316/sq mi)

Mida Woremo (Amharic: ሚዳ ወረሞ) is one of the woredas in the Amhara Region of Ethiopia. Part of the Semien Shewa Zone, Mida Woremo is bordered on the south by the Qechene River which separates it from Merhabiete, on the west by the Oromia Region, and on the north and east by the Debub Wollo Zone; the northern boundary is defined by the Walaqa River. The administrative center of this woreda is Meragna; other towns include Rema.

This woreda was originally named Weremo Wajetuna Midarema, which is the name used in the 1994 national census; it was changed before the Ethiopian Agricultural Sample Survey in October 2001, which used the present name.

As of 2008, 1000 households in Rema receive electricity from solar generation, free of charge. This project is funded by Stiftung Solarenergie, a German foundation promoting solar energy.

== Demographics ==
A 2012 estimate puts the population at 102,000. This gives a population density of 122 people per square kilometer (316 people per square mile), given its area of 836.81 square kilometers (323.09 square miles), lower than the North Shewa Zone average of 126.20 people per square kilometer (326.87 people per square mile).

Based on the 2007 national census conducted by the Central Statistical Agency of Ethiopia (CSA), this woreda has a total population of 93,729, an increase of 36.66% over the 1994 census, of whom 47,074 are men and 46,655 women; 7,049 or 7.52% are urban inhabitants. With an area of 836.81 square kilometers, Mida Woremo has a population density of 112.01 people per square kilometer (290.10 people per square mile), which is less than the Zone average of 115.3 people per square kilometer (298.63 people per square mile). A total of 22,521 households were counted in this woreda, resulting in an average of 4.16 persons to a household, and 21,676 housing units.

The 1994 national census reported a total population for this woreda of 73,809 in 16,289 households, of whom 36,563 were men and 37,246 were women; 3,809 or 5.16% of its population were urban dwellers.

The largest ethnic group reported in Mida Woremo was the Amhara (99.79%), and Amharic was spoken as a first language by 99.8%. The majority of the inhabitants practiced Ethiopian Orthodox Christianity, with 88.43% reporting that as their religion, while 11.47% were Muslim. By 2007 this had remained largely the same, with 88.41% reporting Ethiopian Orthodox Christianity as their religion, while 11.51% of the population said they were Muslim.
