= Hailu Kebede =

Ethiopian military commander (1893–1937)

Wagshum of Wag and Lasta
- In office 1921–1930/1931
- In office 1935–1937

Personal details
- Born: c.1893/1894 Lasta, Ethiopian Empire
- Died: 22 September 1937 (aged 42–44) Walah, Amhara Governorate, Italian East Africa
- Resting place: Debre Genet Medhanialem, Sekota
- Spouse: Shewanesh Abraha
- Children: Wesen Hailu; Zewditu Hailu

Military service
- Allegiance: Ethiopian Empire
- Years of service: 1935–1937
- Unit: Arbegnoch
- Battles/wars: Second Italo-Ethiopian War †

Hailu Kebede (Amharic: ሃይሉ ከበደ or ኃይሉ ከበደ, romanized: Haylu Käbbadä; c.1893/94 – 22 September 1937) was Wagshum and governor of Wag and Lasta in the 1920s. He then became a leader of the resistance Arbegnoch movement against the Fascist Italians during the Italian occupation of Ethiopia.

== Biography ==
The son of Wagshum Kebede Tafari, he was descended from Ras Aligaz of Yejju on his mother's side and was married to Shewanesh Abraha, daughter of Dejazmach Abraha Araya, who was first cousin of Emperor Yohannes IV. Hailu Kebede lived at the court of Ras Tafari Makonnen (who later became Emperor Haile Selassie) and was elected to the Ethiopian Parliament in 1931 as a member of the Senate.

In late 1934, as the Italian conflict loomed, Hailu was sent to Wag to support his father and help organize the war effort. In March 1935, after receiving orders to prepare for mobilization, he traveled with a group of 300 armed fighters to Korem, where a telegraph line connected to Addis Ababa. Before the official mobilization order against the Italians was given in November 1935, Kebede's forces from Wag had already begun advancing northward as vanguard troops to garrison Ambalage. In October 1935, following the defection of Haile Selassie Gugsa, Hailu received orders from the Emperor to march towards Mekele, but was forced to retreat due to the approaching Italian forces. In early November 1935, two Italian planes bombed the forces of Wag near Ambalage, marking the first serious airstrike by the Italian Air Force.

In December 1935, Hailu was once again ordered to lead his forces towards Tembien Province, where the capital city of Abiy Addi had fallen to the Italians. On 18 December 1935, Hailu's forces engaged the well-fortified Italian army and recaptured the strategic peak of Amba Sallare and Abiy Addi. This victory, reported by the Amharic weekly Bérhanénna Sälam, greatly boosted the morale of the Ethiopian forces in the north and inspired further resistance. The victory laid the foundation for the First Battle of Tembien in January 1936, though, in February 1936, the Ethiopians were defeated in Tembien, suffering heavy casualties, particularly due to Italian air superiority.

After the Battle of Maychew on 31 March 1936, Hailu and his forces retreated to the countryside to continue their resistance. He then organized one of the earliest Ethiopian patriot resistance movements, establishing his base in the valley of the Tekeze in Dehana, Wag. The Italians, having lost control of the rural areas of Wag, considered him the greatest threat to their rule in the region.

In early September 1937, the Italians launched an attack on Hailu's forces from several directions, mobilizing a large army from Lasta and Korem, and also gaining support from the Azebo Oromo. Despite initial victories by the forces of Wag, the Italians ultimately overwhelmed them in a major battle on 22 September 1937 at Walah, near Sekota, the capital of Wag. Hailu was wounded and died shortly thereafter. His forces retreated in disarray, while the Rayya-Azaboo Oromo inflicted heavy damage on the region, burning villages, looting the countryside, and destroying churches, all the way to the Tekeze valley.

The Italians gained possession of Hailu's body and transported it to Sekota, where they mutilated it, displaying his head on a long pole for three days in Sekota and Korem to instill fear in the local population. They dropped leaflets proclaiming their victory and issuing warnings to other resistance leaders. Following his death, Hailu's wife, Shewanesh Abraha, rallied the surviving patriots of Wag, leading them beyond the Tekeze River into Begemder, where they continued their struggle against the Italians.
