= Mekoy =

Mekoy መኮይ
- Location within Ethiopia
- Coordinates: 10°43′N 39°45′E
- Country: Ethiopia
- Region: Amhara
- Zone: Semien (North) Shewa
- Woreda: Antsokiyana Gemza
- Elevation: 2,105 m (6,906 ft)

Population (2005)
  - Total: 7,487
- Time zone: UTC+3 (EAT)

Mekoy (Amharic: መኮይ) is a town in north-eastern Ethiopia, located in the Antsokiyana Gemza woreda of the Semien Shewa Zone in the Amhara Region, this town has a latitude and longitude of 10°43′N 39°45′E. It is the administrative center of Antsokiya na Gemza woreda. The town is to be served by a station on the Awash–Weldiya Railway.

Based on figures from the 2007 census in 2005, Mekoy has an estimated total population of 6,619, of whom 3,249 were males and 3,370 were females.
