= Karakore =

- Location within Ethiopia
- Coordinates: 10°29′N 39°56′E
- Country: Ethiopia
- Region: Amhara
- Zone: Semien (North) Shewa
- Elevation: 1,696 m (5,564 ft)

Population (2005)
  - Total: 7,487
- Time zone: UTC+3 (EAT)

Karakore (sometimes spelled as two words, Kara Kore) is a town in north-eastern Ethiopia. Located in the Semien Shewa Zone of the Amhara Region, this town has a latitude and longitude of 10°29′N 39°56′E with an elevation of 1696 meters above sea level.

Passing through the settlement on the main north–south highway in the 1940s, David Buxton described the town as lying to the east of the escarpment of the Ethiopian Highlands, and "a district notorious for armed hold-ups on the road."

== Demographics ==
Based on figures from the Central Statistical Agency in 2005, Karakore has an estimated total population of 7,487 of whom 3,795 were males and 3,692 were females. The 1994 census reported this town had a total population of 4,311 of whom 1,997 were males and 2,314 were females. It is one of three towns in Efratana Gidim woreda.
