= Siyadebrina Wayu =

woreda ሲያደብርና ዋዩ
- Woreda
- Flag
- Zone: Semien Shewa
- Region: Amhara Region

Area
  - Total: 452.35 km^{2} (174.65 sq mi)

Population (2012 est.)
  - Total: 66,422
  - Density: 146.84/km^{2} (380.31/sq mi)

Siyadebrina Wayu (Amharic: ሲያደብርና ዋዩ) is one of the woredas in the Amhara Region of Ethiopia. Located in the Semien Shewa Zone, Siyadebrina Wayu is bordered on the south by the Oromia Region, on the west by Ensaro, on the north by Moretna Jiru, and on the east by Basona Werana. Towns in this woreda include Deneba. Siyadebrina Wayu was part of the former Siyadebrina Wayu Ensaro woreda.

== Demographics ==
A 2012 estimate puts the population at 66,422. This gives a population density of 146.84 people per square kilometer (380.31 people per square mile), given its area of 452.35 square kilometers (174.65 square miles), higher than the North Shewa Zone average of 126.20 people per square kilometer (326.87 people per square mile).

Based on the 2007 national census conducted by the Central Statistical Agency of Ethiopia (CSA), this woreda has a total population of 61,046, of whom 31,322 are men and 29,724 women; 4,522 or 7.41% are urban inhabitants.

The majority of the inhabitants practiced Ethiopian Orthodox Christianity, with 99.58% reporting that as their religion.
