= Legahida =

Legahida ለገሂዳ
- Woreda
- Flag
- Country: Ethiopia
- Region: Amhara
- Zone: Debub Wollo

Area
  - Total: 533.21 km^{2} (205.87 sq mi)

Population (2012 est.)
  - Total: 72,609
  - Density: 136.17/km^{2} (352.69/sq mi)

Legahida (Amharic: ለገሂዳ) is one of the woredas in the Amhara Region of Ethiopia. Part of the Debub Wollo Zone, Legahida is bordered on the south by Jama, on the west by Kelala, on the north by Legambo, and on the east by Were Ilu. Legahida was separated from Were Ilu.

== Demographics ==
A 2012 estimate puts the population at 72,609. This gives a population density of 136.17 people per square kilometer (352.69 people per square mile), given its area of 533.21 square kilometers (205.87 square miles), lower than the South Wollo Zone average of 161.49 people per square kilometer (418.56 people per square mile).

Based on the 2007 national census conducted by the Central Statistical Agency of Ethiopia (CSA), this woreda has a total population of 67,138, of whom 33,222 are men and 33,916 women, 2,064 or 3.07% are urban inhabitants. The majority of the inhabitants were Muslim, with 90.53% reporting that as their religion, while 9.29% of the population said they practiced Ethiopian Orthodox Christianity.
