= Moretna Jiru =

Coordinates: 10°10′N 39°00′E

Moretna Jeru ሞረትና ጅሩ
- Woreda
- Flag
- Interactive map of Moretna Jeru
- Zone: Semien Shewa
- Region: Amhara Region

Area
  - Total: 661.16 km^{2} (255.28 sq mi)

Population (2012 est.)
  - Total: 101,447
  - Density: 153.44/km^{2} (397.40/sq mi)

Moretna Jeru (Amharic ሞረትና ጅሩ "Moret and Jeru") is one of the woredas in the Amhara Region of Ethiopia. It is named in part after the historic district of Shewa, Moret, which lay between the Jamma River and the district of Shewa Meda. Part of the Semien Shewa Zone, Moretna Jeru is bordered on the south by Siyadebrina Wayu, on the south west by Ensaro, on the northwest by Merhabiete, on the northeast by Menz Keya Gebreal, and on the east by Basona Werana. The administrative center of this woreda is Enewari; other towns in Moretna Jeru include Jihur.

== Demographics ==
A 2012 estimate puts the population at 101,447. This gives a population density of 153.44 people per square kilometer (397.40 people per square mile), given its area of 661.16 square kilometers (255.28 square miles), higher than the North Shewa Zone average of 126.20 people per square kilometer (326.87 people per square mile).

Based on the 2007 national census conducted by the Central Statistical Agency of Ethiopia (CSA), this woreda has a total population of 92,937, an increase of 20.34% over the 1994 census, of whom 47,611 are men and 45,326 women; 9,015 or 9.70% are urban inhabitants. With an area of 661.16 square kilometers, Moretna Jiru has a population density of 140.57 people per square kilometer (364.06 people per square mile), which is greater than the Zone average of 115.3 people per square kilometer (298.63 people per square mile). A total of 21,281 households were counted in this woreda, resulting in an average of 4.37 persons to a household, and 20,283 housing units.

The 1994 national census reported a total population for this woreda of 77,226, of whom 39,045 were men and 38,181 were women; 7,240 or 9.38% of its population are urban dwellers.

The largest ethnic group reported in Moretna Jiru was the Amhara (99.48%), and Amharic was spoken as a first language by 99.69%. The majority of the inhabitants practiced Ethiopian Orthodox Christianity, with 99.39% reporting that as their religion in 1994. By 2007 that had changed very little, with 99.43% reporting the same.

== Notes ==
The major soil type, especially in the plain, is Vertisols, which is characterized by high moisture-holding capacity.
