= Kewet (woreda) =

District in Amhara Region, Ethiopia

Coordinates: 10°10′N 39°45′E

Kewet ቀወት
- Woreda
- Flag
- Interactive map of Kewet
- Zone: Semien Shewa
- Region: Amhara

Area
  - Total: 785.85 km^{2} (303.42 sq mi)

Population (2012 est.)
  - Total: 130,145
  - Density: 165.61/km^{2} (428.93/sq mi)

Kewet (Amharic: ቀወት also transliterated Qawat) is a woreda in Amhara Region, Ethiopia. Part of the Semien Shewa Zone, Kewet is bordered on the southwest by Termaber, on the northwest by Menz Mam Midir, on the north by Efratana Gidim, and on the east by Afar Region. The major town in Kewet is Shewa Robit.

Between 1994 and 2004 the boundaries of Kewet changed slightly. One kebele was transferred to Termaber and several kebeles north of Shewa Robit were moved into the Afar Region.

The Argobba villages in this woreda are located in the kebeles of Guze—which include Wankar, Dedeger, Bosen, Alwad, and Kelebar Mashla, arranged around the foot of Guze Guba—and Rasa Guba. The hill of Guze Guba, according to local elders interviewed by Kebedde Geleta, having "only one entrance and one exit always guarded by watchment" served the Argobba "both as a settlement and a fort." Kebedde's article includes an inventory of the mosques in these villages, which include one containing household items said to belong to Sheikh Faqi Ahmed and another in ruins, as well as several cemeteries including the one containing the tomb of "Sheikh Hussein from Arsi, son of Yeliuyuy".

== Demographics ==
A 2012 estimate puts the population at 130,145. This gives a population density of 165.61 people per square kilometer (428.93 people per square mile), given its area of 785.85 square kilometers (303.42 square miles), higher than the North Shewa Zone average of 126.20 people per square kilometer (326.87 people per square mile).

Based on the 2007 national census conducted by the Central Statistical Agency of Ethiopia (CSA), this woreda has a total population of 118,381, an increase of 9.97% over the 1994 census, of whom 60,934 are men and 57,447 women; 17,575 or 14.85% are urban inhabitants. With an area of 785.85 square kilometers, Kewet has a population density of 150.64, which is greater than the Zone average of 115.3 persons per square kilometer. A total of 29,058 households were counted in this woreda, resulting in an average of 4.07 persons to a household, and 28,104 housing units. The 1994 national census reported a total population for this woreda of 107,644 in 19,714 households, of whom 54,559 were men and 53,085 were women; 14,287 or 13.27% of its population were urban dwellers.

The three largest ethnic groups reported in Kewet were the Amhara (87.98%), the Argobba (7.55%), and the Oromo (3.86%); all other ethnic groups made up 0.61% of the population. Amharic was spoken as a first language by 93.8%, Oromiffa by 3.75%, and Argobba by 1.99%; the remaining 0.46% spoke all other primary languages reported. The majority of the inhabitants practiced Ethiopian Orthodox Christianity, with 80.3% reporting that as their religion, while 19.38% were Muslim. This figure shifted somewhat in the next 13 years, with the 2007 census showing 84.41% reporting Ethiopian Orthodox Christianity as their religion, while 14.66% of the population said they were Muslim.
