= Adabay River =

River in Ethiopia

Adabay
- Location within Ethiopia

Location
- Country: Ethiopia
- Region: Amhara Region

Physical characteristics
- Source
  - coordinates: 10°1′N 39°3′E
  - elevation: 1,905 m (6,250 ft)

Basin features
- River system: Permanent river
- Tributaries
  - left: Beresa
  - right: Chacha
- Topography: Mountains and deep gorges

Adabay River is a river of central Ethiopia which, along with the Wanchet River, defined the former district of Marra Biete. Its tributaries include the Chacha, the Beresa, and three other streams which join together at the top of a deep canyon.
