= Merhabete =

District in Amhara Region, Ethiopia

Coordinates: 10°15′N 38°45′E

Merhabete መርሐ ቤቴ
- Woreda
- Flag
- Interactive map of Merhabete
- Country: Ethiopia
- Region: Amhara

Area
  - Total: 1,058.19 km^{2} (408.57 sq mi)

Population (2012 est.)
  - Total: 138,211
  - Density: 130.61/km^{2} (338.28/sq mi)

Merhabete (Amharic: መርሐ ቤቴ) is a woreda in Amhara Region, Ethiopia. Part of the Semien Shewa Zone, Merhabete is bordered on the south by Ensaro, on the west by the Oromia Region, on the north by Mida Woremo, on the east by Menz Keya Gebreal, and on the southeast by Moretna Jiru. The Jamma River defines this woreda's southern and eastern boundaries, and its tributary the Qechene defines its western and northern. The administrative center is Alem Ketema; other towns in this woreda include Fetira.

This woreda is named after the former province, Marra Biete, whose territory included the area this woreda is located. Merhabiete was originally named Lay Betna Tach Bet (Amharic "The Upper House and Lower House"), the name used in the 1994 national census, but it was changed before the Ethiopian Agricultural Sample Survey in October 2001, which used the present name.

== Etymology ==
The name "Merhabete" comes from two Ge'ez words (መርሐ meaning led or became a leader and ቤት meaning house) with an Amharic suffix (ኤ a genitive case suffix).

== Demographics ==
A 2012 estimate puts the population at 138,211. This gives a population density of 130.61 people per square kilometer (338.28 people per square mile), given its area of 1058.19 square kilometers (408.57 square miles), slightly higher than the North Shewa Zone average of 126.20 people per square kilometer (326.87 people per square mile).

Based on the 2007 national census conducted by the Central Statistical Agency of Ethiopia (CSA), this woreda has a total population of 126,501, an increase of 27.87% over the 1994 census, of whom 63,997 are men and 62,504 women; 13,113 or 10.37% are urban inhabitants. With an area of 1,058.19 square kilometers, Merhabete had a population density of 119.54 people per square kilometer (309.62 people per square mile), which is greater than the Zone average of 115.3 people per square kilometer (298.63 people per square mile). A total of 29,916 households were counted in this woreda, resulting in an average of 4.23 persons to a household, and 29,075 housing units.

The 1994 national census reported a total population for this woreda of 98,930 in 20,161 households, of whom 50,184 were men and 48,746 were women; 8,977 or 9.07% of its population were urban dwellers.

The largest ethnic group reported in Merhabete was the Amhara (99.78%), and Amharic was spoken as a first language by 99.8%. The majority of the inhabitants practiced Ethiopian Orthodox Christianity, with 99.87% reporting that as their religion. This had changed little by 2007, with 99.63% reporting that as their religion.
