= Kelela (woreda) =

Coordinates: 10°45′N 38°50′E

Kelala ከለላ
- Woreda
- Flag
- Interactive map of Kelala
- Country: Ethiopia
- Region: Amhara
- Zone: Debub Wollo

Area
  - Total: 1,422.15 km^{2} (549.10 sq mi)

Population (2012 est.)
  - Total: 148,195
  - Density: 104.21/km^{2} (269.89/sq mi)

Kelala (Amharic: ከለላ) is one of the woredas in the Amhara Region of Ethiopia. Part of the Debub Wollo Zone, Kelala is bordered on the south by the Semien Shewa Zone, on the southwest by the Walaqa River which separates it from the Oromia Region, on the west by Wegde, on the north by Legambo, on the northeast by Legahida, and on the east by Jama. Towns in Kelala include Kelala and Liguama. Kelala town is 157 km far from Dessie in the Western direction.

== Demographics ==
A 2012 estimate puts the population at 148,195. This gives a population density of 104.21 people per square kilometer (269.89 people per square mile), given its area of 1,422.15 square kilometers (549.10 square miles), much lower than the South Wollo Zone average of 161.49 people per square kilometer (418.56 people per square mile).

Based on the 2007 national census conducted by the Central Statistical Agency of Ethiopia (CSA), this woreda has a total population of 136,545, an increase of 16.69% over the 1994 census, of whom 67,929 are men and 68,616 women; 7,640 or 5.60% are urban inhabitants. With an area of 1,422.15 square kilometers, Kelala has a population density of 96.01, which is less than the Zone average of 147.58 persons per square kilometer. A total of 32,815 households were counted in this woreda, resulting in an average of 4.16 persons to a household, and 31,497 housing units. The 1994 national census reported a total population for this woreda of 117,011 in 27,422 households, of whom 58,069 were men and 58,942 were women; 4,060 or 3.47% of its population were urban dwellers.

In 1994 the two largest ethnic groups reported in Kelala were the Amhara (87.24%), and the Oromo (12.64%); all other ethnic groups made up 0.12% of the population. Amharic was spoken as a first language by 90.72%, and 9.2% spoke Oromiffa; the remaining 0.08% spoke all other primary languages reported. The majority of the inhabitants were Muslim, with 95.53% of the population having reported they practiced that belief, while 4.33% of the population said they professed Ethiopian Orthodox Christianity. This was almost identical in 2007, with 95.44% reporting Islam as their religion, while 4.43% of the population said they practiced Ethiopian Orthodox Christianity.
