= Legambo =

District in Amhara Region, Ethiopia

Coordinates: 11°00′N 39°00′E

Legambo ለጋምቦ
- Woreda
- Flag
- Interactive map of Legambo
- Country: Ethiopia
- Region: Amhara
- Zone: Debub Wollo

Area
  - Total: 1,017.35 km^{2} (392.80 sq mi)

Population (2012 est.)
  - Total: 178,817
  - Density: 175.77/km^{2} (455.24/sq mi)

Legambo (Amharic: ለጋምቦ) is a woreda in Amhara Region, Ethiopia. This woreda is named for one of the "Houses" or subgroups of the Bete Amhara, who were located there. Part of the Debub Wollo Zone, Legambo is bordered on the south by Legahida and Kelala, on the southwest by Wegde, on the west by Debre Sina, on the northwest by Sayint, on the north by Tenta, on the northeast by Dessie Zuria, and on the southeast by Were Ilu. Towns in Legambo include Aqesta and Embacheber.

Elevations in this woreda range from 1500 to 3700 meters; the highest point in this woreda, as well as the Debub Wollo Zone, is Mount Amba Ferit, which lies on the border with Sayint.

== Demographics ==
A 2012 estimate puts the population at 178,817. This gives a population density of 175.77 people per square kilometer (455.24 people per square mile), given its area of 1,017.35 square kilometers (392.80 square miles), higher than the South Wollo Zone average of 161.49 people per square kilometer (418.56 people per square mile).

Based on the 2007 national census conducted by the Central Statistical Agency of Ethiopia (CSA), this woreda has a total population of 165,026, an increase of 3.93% over the 1994 census, of whom 81,268 are men and 83,758 women; 7,327 or 4.44% are urban inhabitants. With an area of 1,017.35 square kilometers, Legambo has a population density of 162.21, which is greater than the Zone average of 147.58 persons per square kilometer. A total of 39,078 households were counted in this woreda, resulting in an average of 4.22 persons to a household, and 37,384 housing units. The 1994 national census reported a total population for this woreda of 158,785 in 38,182 households, of whom 78,087 were men and 80,698 were women; 4,286 or 2.7% of its population were urban dwellers.

In 1994 the largest ethnic group reported in Legambo was the Amhara (99.9%). Amharic was spoken as a first language by 99.92%. The majority of the inhabitants were Muslim, with 92.99% of the population having reported they practiced that belief, while 6.82% of the population said they professed Ethiopian Orthodox Christianity. This had changed very little by 2007, with 93.34% reporting Islam as their religion, while 6.5% of the population said they practiced Ethiopian Orthodox Christianity.
