= Marra Biete =

Former province in northern Ethiopia

Marra Biete (Amharic: መራቤቴ) is a former province of Ethiopia, located inside the boundaries of the modern Semien Shewa Zone of the Amhara Region, north of Shewa Meda.

According to Johann Ludwig Krapf, Marra Biete lay in the northwest part of the former province of Shewa, "between the rivers Jamma and Wonshit." This would place Marra Biete in the area currently occupied by the modern woredas of Dera, Merhabiete, and Mida Woremo.

One of the earliest mentions of Marra Biete is in the Gadla, or hagiography, of Saint Abba Filipos, the third abbot of the monastery of Debre Libanos. Another medieval Ethiopian saint, Gabra Manfas Qeddus, is also said to have visited Marra Biete. Krapf provides a sketchy outline of its later political history. He writes that Marra Biete was first ruled by one Demetrios, who was succeeded by his son Waldu, who in turn was succeeded by Dejen. It was during the reign of Dejen when Morra Biete was annexed to Shewa. Dechen's daughter, Bezabish, was the first wife or queen of Sahle Selassie.
