= Alem Ketema =

Town in Ethiopia

Coordinates: 10.083°N 39.033°E

Alem Ketema (Amharic: ዓለም ከተማ) is a town in North Shewa Zone, Amhara Region, Ethiopia. It is the administrative centre of Merhabete woreda. The official spelling is 'Alem Ketema (with initial diacritical), and alternative spellings are Alem Catema and Alām Katma.

In 1993, a project was established to build a 675km road from Alem Ketema to Sekota.
