= Walaqa River =

Tributary river of Blue Nile in Ethiopia

- Location of mouth

Location
- Country: Ethiopia
- Regions of Ethiopia: Amhara, Oromia

Physical characteristics
- Mouth: Blue Nile
  - coordinates: 10.3675°N 38.4987°E
- Basin size: 4,450 km^{2} (1,720 sq mi)

Basin features
- Progression: Blue Nile → Nile → Mediterranean Sea
- River system: Nile Basin
- Population: 980,000

The Walaqa River, a tributary of the Blue Nile, is a river in the Amhara Region of Ethiopia. Wegde is located to its north. Mida Woremo and Dera are to the south, while Kelala is to the northeast. The Walaqa River may have been the northern boundary of the historical province of Walaqa.

== See also ==
- List of Ethiopian rivers
