= Wegde =

Coordinates: 10°40′N 38°30′E

- Woreda
- Flag
- Interactive map of Wegde
- Country: Ethiopia
- Region: Amhara
- Zone: Debub Wollo

Area
  - Total: 1,110.69 km^{2} (428.84 sq mi)

Population (2012 est.)
  - Total: 146,316
  - Density: 131.73/km^{2} (341.19/sq mi)

Wegde (Amharic: ወግዲ) is one of the woredas in the Amhara Region of Ethiopia. Part of the Debub Wollo Zone, Wegde is bordered on the south by the Walaqa River which separates it from the Oromia Region, on the west by the Abay River which separates it from the Misraq Gojjam Zone, on the north by Borena, on the northeast by Legambo, and on the east by Kelala. The major town in Wegde is Mahdere Selam.

Wegde lies on the lower portion of a spur running from Mount Amba Ferit southwest to the confluence of the Walaqa with the Abay; altitudes range from 500 meters above sea level to 2700 meters at the northeast point of the woreda. Rivers include the Taqat, and Yashum.

Wegde had been part of the neighboring woreda Debre Sina until the two were separated in the summer of 1994.

== Demographics ==
A 2012 estimate puts the population at 146,316. This gives a population density of 131.73 people per square kilometer (341.19 people per square mile), given its area of 1,110.69 square kilometers (428.84 square miles), lower than the South Wollo Zone average of 161.49 people per square kilometer (418.56 people per square mile).

Based on the 2007 national census conducted by the Central Statistical Agency of Ethiopia (CSA), this woreda has a total population of 135,240, an increase of 33.21% over the 1994 census, of whom 66,763 are men and 68,477 women; 4,519 or 3.34% are urban inhabitants. With an area of 1,110.69 square kilometers, Wegde has a population density of 121.76, which is less than the Zone average of 147.58 persons per square kilometer. A total of 31,933 households were counted in this woreda, resulting in an average of 4.24 persons to a household, and 30,886 housing units. The 1994 national census reported a total population for this woreda of 101,521 in 24,495 households, of whom 50,179 were men and 51,342 were women; 1,678 or 1.65% of its population were urban dwellers.

In 1994 the two largest ethnic groups reported in Wegde were the Amhara (83.6%), and the Oromo (16.29%); all other ethnic groups made up 0.11% of the population. Amharic was spoken as a first language by 93.01%, and 6.93% spoke Oromiffa; the remaining 0.06% spoke all other primary languages reported. The majority of the inhabitants were Muslim, with 65.95% of the population reported as practicing that belief, while 33.9% of the population said they professed Ethiopian Orthodox Christianity. This had shifted somewhat by 2007, with 64.24% reporting Islam as their religion, while 35.67% of the population said they practiced Ethiopian Orthodox Christianity.
