= Were Ilu =

Town in Amhara Region, Ethiopia

Were Ilu ወረ ኢሉ
- Town
- Location within Ethiopia
- Coordinates: 10°36′N 39°26′E
- Country: Ethiopia
- Region: Amhara
- Zone: Debub Wollo

Population (2005)
  - Total: 10,062
- Time zone: UTC+3 (EAT)

Were Ilu (Amharic: ወረ ኢሉ; Oromo: Warra Illu) is a town in north-central Ethiopia. Located in the Debub Wollo Zone of the Amhara Region, this town has a latitude and longitude of 10°36′N 39°26′E. From the 1870s, Were Ilu had a Thursday market.

The Medhane Alem church, dating from at least from the early 1900s, is a notable local landmark. Empress Zewditu was born at Were Ilu, and Ras Habte Maryam was buried there.

Based on figures from the Central Statistical Agency in 2005, this town has an estimated total population of 10,062 of whom 4,942 were men and 5,120 were women. The 1994 census reported this town had a total population of 5,809 of whom 2,600 were males and 3,209 were females. It is the largest of three towns in Were Ilu woreda.

== History ==
While still ruler of Shewa, Menelik II had a ketamma (or fortified camp) built at Were Ilu and Enewari in 1869 to guard his northern frontier and pacify the Wollo Oromo, who were his neighbors. In September of the following year, after Menelik had recaptured Maqdala, the Wollo chiefs came to Were Ilu at the Mesqel feast to make formal submission and take an oath of fealty to the king and to Mohammad Ali, whom Menelik had appointed governor of Wollo.

During the 1870s, Menelik resided at Were Ilu for extended periods. However, while the ruler of Shewa campaigned in Gojjam in early 1877, a rebellion caused by the intrigues of his consort Baffana led to Were Ilu being sacked and burned, and forced Menelik to return to Shewa. Emperor Yohannes IV met with Menelik twice at Were Ilu: the first time in 1878 to accept his fealty; and a second time in 1882 to discipline him for disturbing the peace of Yohannes' realm by fighting with Negus Tekle Haymanot the Battle of Embabo.

After Menelik became Emperor of Ethiopia and moved his capital south to Addis Ababa, Were Ilu declined somewhat in importance. Writing in the 1890s, Augustus B. Wylde described the Were Ilu market, held on Saturdays, as very large in size, with petty European goods and locally made cloth available; upon visiting its market, he was impressed by the large piles of woolen goods for sale there, declaring that it "may be called the Bradford of Abyssinia". In 1895 Were Ilu became a supply dump, where the emperor stored about one and a half million cartridges and thousands of guns, as well as setting up numerous granaries, and it served as an organizing point for Menelik's army at the beginning of the First Italo-Abyssinian War. Although its location led to the telegraph line the Italians constructed between 1902 and 1904 from Asmara south to Addis Ababa passing through the town and giving it a local telegraph office, Were Ilu was connected north to Molale by only a trail as late as 1962. Branches of the telegraph line led from Were Ilu east to Ankober and west to Gondar through Debre Tabor.

On 28 March 1990, during the Ethiopian Civil War, an aerial attack on Were Ilu by Derg airplanes destroyed a grain stockpile, but inflicted no casualties.

In June 2002, some people were relocated from Were Ilu, north to Badme. This was part of a pilot project in which volunteers were relocated from the crowded Ethiopian Highlands to less crowded parts of the country.

Were Ilu was captured by the TDF in 2021 during the Tigray War.
