= Abuye Meda =

Mountain in Ethiopia

- Location within Ethiopia

Highest point
- Elevation: 4,012 m (13,163 ft)
- Coordinates: 10°31′00″N 39°46′00″E

Geography
- Location: Semien Shewa Zone, Amhara Region, Ethiopia

Abuye Meda (Amharic: አቡዬ ሜዳ) is a mountain plateau located between three woreda's; Gishe in the west, Antsokiyana Gemza to the north, and Efratana Gidim to the south. It is the highest elevation of the Semien Shewa Zone in the Amhara Region, Ethiopia. It forms part of the divide between the drainage basins of the Abay and the Awash Rivers. It's around 98 km to the north of Debre Berhan, the capital of Semien Shewa Zone.
