= Menz Lalo Midir =

District in Amhara Region, Ethiopia

Menz Lalo Midir መንዝ ላሎ ምድር
- Woreda
- Flag
- Zone: Semien Shewa
- Region: Amhara

Area
  - Total: 381.65 km^{2} (147.36 sq mi)

Population (2012 est.)
  - Total: 18,638
  - Density: 48.835/km^{2} (126.48/sq mi)

Menz Lalo Midir (Amharic: መንዝ ላሎ ምድር) is one of the woredas in the Amhara Region of Ethiopia. It is named after the district of the former province of Menz, Lalo Meder. Located in the Semien Shewa Zone, Menz Lalo Midir is bordered on the southeast by Menz Mama Midir, on the west by Menz Keya Gebreal, and on the north by Menz Gera Midir. Menz Lalo Midir was part of former Mam Midrina Lalo Midir woreda.

== Demographics ==
A 2012 estimate puts the population at 18,638. This gives a population density of 48.84 people per square kilometer (126.48 people per square mile), given its area of 318.65 square kilometers (147.36 square miles), less than half the North Shewa Zone average of 126.20 people per square kilometer (326.87 people per square mile).

Based on the 2007 national census conducted by the Central Statistical Agency of Ethiopia (CSA), this woreda has a total population of 17,308, of whom 8,643 are men and 8,665 women; none are urban inhabitants.

The majority of the inhabitants practiced Ethiopian Orthodox Christianity, with 99.93% reporting that as their religion.
