= Tekle Wolde Hawaryat =

Ethiopian politician (1900–1969)

Tekle Wolde Hawaryat (1900 – 17 November 1969) was an Ethiopian politician. Anthony Mockler describes him as "the only contemporary of Haile Selassie who throughout a long life was always prepared to come out in open opposition to him."

== History ==
Hawaryat received a traditional education at the church school at Saint Raguel on Mount Entoto, along with his contemporary Makonnen Habte-Wold, and his later friend Blattengeta Heruy Welde Sellase. Along with Makonnen Habte-Wold, he became a deacon and was appointed to serve in the palace of Emperor Menelik during the last years of his reign; there he came to the attention of the future Emperor, who appointed him customs director in western Ethiopia, and was serving as director-general of Addis Ababa at the outbreak of the Second Italo-Abyssinian War.

It was during the years before the War that Tekle expressed his views against European colonialism. In response to a 1926 article in the periodical Berhanena Salam by Gebre Haywat Baykadagna, where Gebre Haywat unfavorably compared independent Ethiopia to the Italian colony of Eritrea, Tekle wrote that many Eritreans lamented their life under Italian rule: "in his characteristic allegorical style", states historian Bahru Zewde, a colonial subject "is like a bird kept in a cage in pomp and luxury in order to have its plumes plucked."

Tekle Wolde Hawaryat's break with Haile Selassie came when the Emperor decided to leave Ethiopia, when Ethiopia had clearly lost to Italy, in order to personally address the League of Nations. Following the Ethiopian defeat at Maychew, Tekle decided to remain in Ethiopia and continue resistance to the Italians. At one point in the conversations on 1 May 1936, when the Emperor pondered taking the unprecedented act of leaving Ethiopia, Tekle marched up to the Emperor with a pistol barrel in his mouth and addressed Haile Selassie, "Are you not the son of Theodore?"—referring to Tewodros' act of committing suicide at the moment of utter defeat, rather than resort to flight or surrender. After Haile Selassie departed Addis Ababa, Tekle gathered his own partisans and left to continue fighting. Within a few months, he joined the garrison at Jimma, and retreated with them to Ras Imru Haile Selassie's encampment in the wilderness between Jimma and Gore. When Ras Imru rejected Tekle's proposals for a campaign of guerrilla war against the invaders, he departed to go his own way.

Tekle attempted to unite the fractious bands of the arbegnoch, the Ethiopian resistance fighters, but met little success. Disillusioned with his Emperor, he embraced a republican ideology, which had permeated Ethiopia through French influence on the intellectuals of the city of Dire Dawa. At one point, having heard that Ethiopian notables from Jerusalem had arrived at Khartoum he hurried to the city only to find they were his Emperor and his attendants, Tekle warned them about how the British regarded the Ethiopians, advising Haile Selassie to raise his own army to free their country, and not rely on the British. Although the meeting ended inconclusively, and the Emperor and his followers were relieved when Tekle Wolde Hawaryat went to Kenya to find supporters to his views, Haile Selassie did consider some of Tekle's points and began to press the British to help him form an Ethiopian army of liberation. After Haile Selassie convinced the British to aid his return to Ethiopian soil, Tekle "did all he could to prevent him from regaining his throne. When British arms supported the return, Takkala dedicated the rest of his life to trying to dethrone Hayla-Selassie."

At first Tekle was imprisoned (1942–1945), then released and the Emperor made an attempt to placate his former friend by making him afenegus; caught in another plot against the Emperor, he was imprisoned for a longer period, until 1954. He regained the office of afenegus, only to lose it after another unsuccessful plot. Released a final time, an old man in his sixties, it was thought that he had at last put aside his plots—only to be discovered at the center of one last plot to kill the Emperor with a landmine in the road outside of Sebeta. He was killed in a shootout with police at his home in Addis Ababa.
