= Efratana Gidim =

District in Amhara Region, Ethiopia

Coordinates: 9°30′N 39°40′E

Efratana Gidim ኤፍራታና ግድም
- Woreda
- Flag
- Interactive map of Efratana Gidim
- Zone: Semien Shewa
- Region: Amhara

Area
  - Total: 516.85 km^{2} (199.56 sq mi)

Population (2012 est.)
  - Total: 121,308
  - Density: 234.71/km^{2} (607.89/sq mi)

Efratana Gidim (Amharic: ኤፍራታና ግድም "Efrata and Gedem") is a woreda in Amhara Region, Ethiopia. It is named after two historic districts that were part of the former autonomous kingdom of Shewa, Efrata and Gedem. Part of the Semien Shewa Zone, Efratana Gidim is bordered on the south by Kewet, on the southwest by Menz Mam Midir, on the west by Menz Gera Midir, on the north by Antsokiyana Gemza, and on the east by the Oromia Zone. The administrative center of this woreda is Ataye (Effeson); other towns in Efratana Gidim include Karakore.

== Overview ==
The highest point in the woreda, as well as the Semien Shewa Zone, is Mount Abuye Meda (4012 meters).

Megalithic archeological sites have been identified in this woreda beginning in 1980, most having legends or folktales associated with them. Most recently a megalithic site was discovered, unknown to local residents, 10 kilometers southwest of Ataye and 15 kilometers east of Gadilo Meda, comprising six stelae, three of which were phallic in shape.

== Demographics ==
A 2012 census puts the population at 121,308. This gives a population density of 234.71 people per square kilometer (607.89 people per square mile), given its area of 516.85 square kilometers (199.56 square miles), much higher than the North Shewa Zone average of 126.20 people per square kilometer (326.87 people per square mile).

Based on the 2007 national census conducted by the Central Statistical Agency of Ethiopia (CSA), this woreda has a total population of 110,493, an increase of 9.94% over the 1994 census, of whom 55,672 are men and 54,821 women; 15,319 or 13.86% are urban inhabitants. With an area of 516.85 square kilometers, Efratana Gidim has a population density of 213.78 people per square kilometer (553.68 people per square mile), which is greater than the Zone average of 115.3 people per square kilometer (298.63 people per square mile). A total of 26,239 households were counted in this woreda, resulting in an average of 4.21 persons to a household, and 25,427 housing units.The 1994 national census reported a total population for this woreda of 100,507 in 17,323 households, of whom 50,422 were men and 50,085 were women; 16,515 or 16.43% of its population were urban dwellers.

The majority of the inhabitants practiced Ethiopian Orthodox Christianity, with 88.46% reporting that as their religion, while 10.99% of the population said they were Muslim. The three largest ethnic groups reported in Efratana Gidim were the Amhara (95.27%), the Argobba (2.9%), and the Oromo (1.11%); all other ethnic groups made up 0.72% of the population. Amharic was spoken as a first language by 98.59%, and Oromiffa was spoken by 0.98%; the remaining 0.43% spoke all other primary languages reported.
