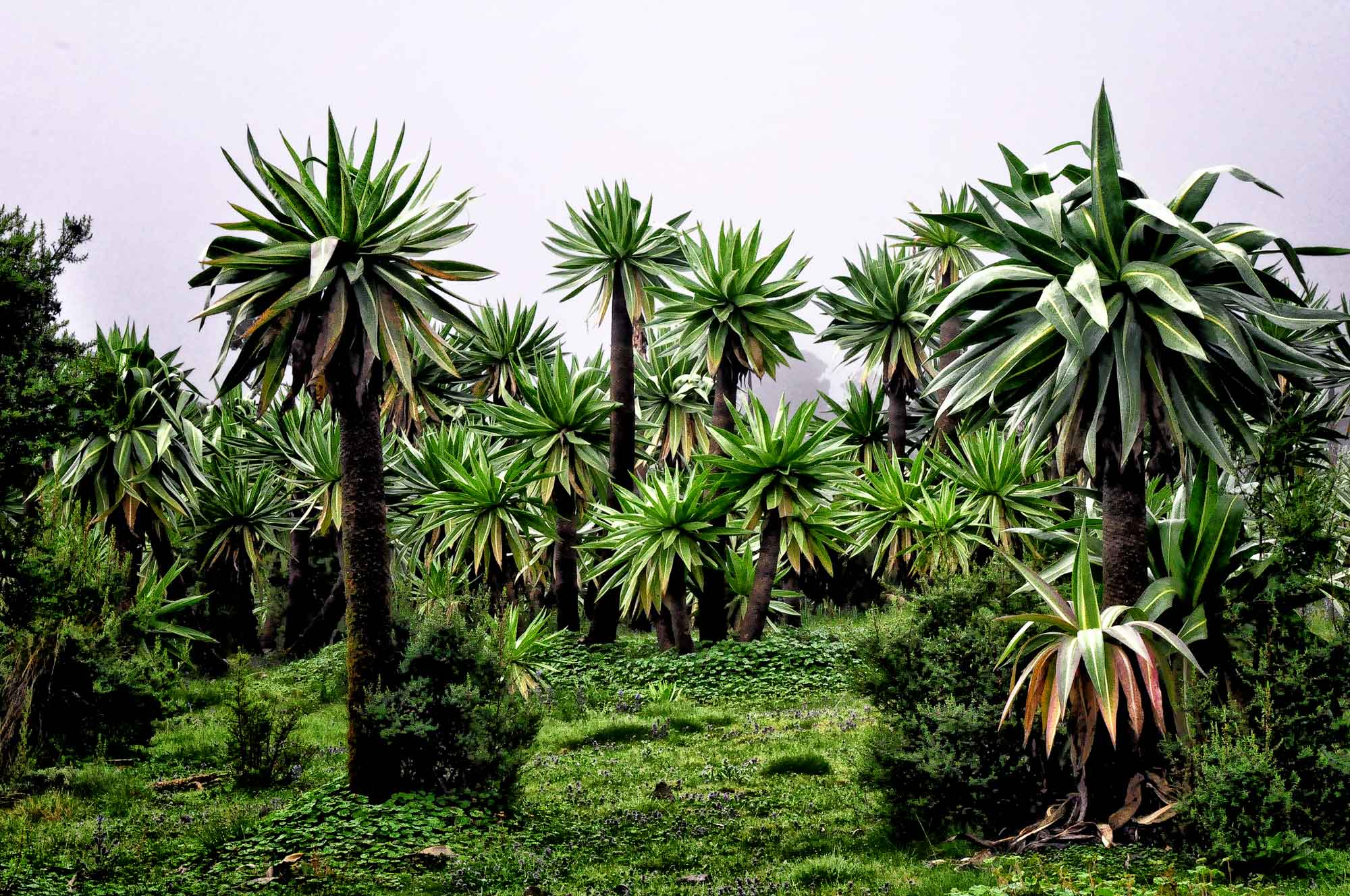

Scientific classification
- Kingdom: Plantae
- Clade: Embryophytes
- Clade: Tracheophytes
- Clade: Angiosperms
- Clade: Eudicots
- Clade: Asterids
- Order: Asterales
- Family: Campanulaceae
- Genus: Lobelia
- Species: L. rhynchopetalum

Binomial name
- Lobelia rhynchopetalum Hemsl.

Synonyms
- Dortmanna montana\(Fresen.) Kuntze Rhynchopetalum montanum; Fresen. Tupa montana; (Fresen.) Vatke Tupa rhynchopetalum; Hochst. ex A.Rich. Lobelia rhynchopetalum subsp. callosomarginata; E.Wimm.

= Lobelia rhynchopetalum =

Species of flowering plant

Lobelia rhynchopetalum, the giant lobelia, is a flowering plant in the family Campanulaceae. It is endemic to Ethiopia. Its habitat is the Afroalpine climate of the Semien Mountains and Bale Mountains National Park. Recent study show that it is under a threat of climate change. The plant is a pachycaulous "palmoid" plant up to 6.5 m (21 ft) height of which up to 3.5 m (11 ft) is the violet-flowered inflorescence.
