= Menz =

Former province in northern Ethiopia

Menz or Manz (Amharic: መንዝ, romanized: Mänz) is a former subdivision of Ethiopia, located inside the boundaries of the modern Semien Shewa Zone of the Amhara Region. William Cornwallis Harris described Menz as lying "westward" of Gedem but between that former province and Marra Biete.

Donald Levine explains that Menz was divided into three parts: Mama Meder in the center; Lalo Meder in the south; and Gera Meder in the north. Further, he defines its boundaries as "the Mofar River in the south, the Adabay and Wanchet rivers in the west, the Qechene River in the north, and in the east a long chain of mountains which pour forth the waters that drain across Manz and which divide it from the lowlands of Efrata, Gedem, and Qawat." This would roughly equate to the modern woredas of Gera Midirna Keya Gebriel and Mam Midrina Lalo Midir.

== History ==
Menz is first mentioned in the Glorious Victories of Amda Seyon (who ruled in the early 14th century) as a Muslim province, where it is called "Manzehel", and mentioned again in the Royal Chronicles of Baeda Maryam. This small province came to form the core of the autonomous Ethiopian state of Shewa. Negasi Krestos, a leading warlord of Menz, extended his power to the south by conquest, proclaimed himself ruler of Shewa, and defeated all of his rivals. Afterwards Menz, along with Merhabete became birthplaces of a line of rulers which culminated in the Shewan branch of the Imperial family of Ethiopia. It is for these reasons that Shoans often refer to Menz as "ye Amara mentch',"the source of the Amhara, with "Menze" having historically been used by southern populations as a catch-all term for all "Abyssinian" settlers during the late 19th century Ethiopian imperial expansions.

== Local culture ==
Based on discussions with neighboring peoples, Johann Ludwig Krapf wrote that the people of Menz "have the character of being brave, quarrelsome, inhospitable, inherently brave, and if they are educated, they can change their behaviour, and they are resilient in nature, and they are born with truth." Krapf continues, observing

that as no strong royal hand is able to govern them, every trifle causes them to be at variance with each other. A little affront or a small matter that happens on account of the boundaries of their fields, raises such animosities between them, that they draw their swords and they keep their words. These continual contests and their self-interestedness, make them conservative, and they keep what they say. Each individual, or several families being the issue of a great man, build their houses, wherever they find convenient for the sake of their property, or for the purpose of more easily watching their fields. On this account therefore you do not see large villages in Mans [sic]. They do not fight against a common and general enemy, but they give attention to the enemies that they know with evidence, and therefore they say, "We will not fight against the innocents [sic], who do not harm us; but we fight with the proven enemy in the nearby, who ever they are as long as proven to be harmful."

The culture of Menz is further distinguished by its selective emphasis on certain values which are universal in Amhara culture. Chief among these are the values of rest, - Rest, land inherited from a relative, usually father or mother, is an object of the highest respect and devotion in Menz. The feeling against selling it to someone out- side one's family is exceedingly strong among the Menzes. Those who migrate from Manz retain a deep sentimental attachment to any rest they may happen t o own there, and the claim of some- one who has been away from his family's land even for more than a generation is greatly respected in Manz. This sentiment is expressed in a favourite Manze proverb: Ye Menze rest ba shi amatu / la balabetu; Menz rest (belongs) to its owner until the thousandth year. Menz was also traditionally distinguished for its religious devotion and adherence to fasting, giving it an aire of conservatism. An example of Menz's conservatism is illustrated by the attempted revolt of Mesfin and Merid Biru, but it can not represent the entire Menz, and this must not mislead the reader; two brothers and the sons of one of Ethiopia's largest landowners. Following the Ethiopian Revolution, in January 1975 they slipped away from Addis Ababa to organize a rebellion among peasants in Menz. Although this was not the center of their family's vast landholdings, it was only in Menz that they could obtain peasant support. Because of the area's isolation they could sell to the peasants their own interpretation of the events. They told the peasants that the Derg government was dominated by Moslems who would destroy the Ethiopian Church and take away land from Christians. As proof, the brothers played tape recorded statements of alleged government declarations broadcast over Radio Ethiopia which stated as much. Despite that their effort was doomed, it wasn't until October 1975, that security forces were able to finally track down Mesfin and Merid and kill them. In general, they are the peoples of God, and they trust in God, and they mean what they say.
