= Antsokiyana Gemza =

Coordinates: 10°45′N 39°40′E

Antsokia Gemza አንጾኪያና ገምዛ
- Woreda
- Flag
- Interactive map of Antsokia Gemza
- Zone: Semien Shewa
- Region: Amhara Region
- Seat: Mekoy

Area
  - Total: 372.18 km^{2} (143.70 sq mi)

Population (2012 est.)
  - Total: 87,073
  - Density: 233.95/km^{2} (605.94/sq mi)

Antsokiyana Gemza (Amharic: አንጾኪያና ገምዛ "Antsokiya and Gemza") is a wereda in the Amhara Region of Ethiopia. This district is partly named for one of the districts of Shewa, Antsokia. Part of the North Shewa Zone, Antsokiyana Gemza is bordered on the south by Efratana Gidim, on the southwest by Menz Gera Midir, on the west by Gishe, and on the north and east by the Oromia Zone. The administrative center is Mekoy; other towns in Antsokiyana Gemza include Majete.

Local landmarks in this district include the Tomb of Saint Gelawdewos, where the head of the holy emperor of that name was buried in 1562.

== Demographics ==
A 2012 estimate puts the population at 87,073. This gives a population density of 233.95 people per square kilometer (605.94 people per square mile), given its area of 372.18 square kilometers (143.70 square miles), much higher than the North Shewa Zone average of 126.20 people per square kilometer (326.87 people per square mile).

Based on the 2007 national census conducted by the Central Statistical Agency (CSA), this district has a total population of 79,091, an increase of 7.75% over the 1994 census, of whom 39,327 are men and 39,764 women; 12,547 or 15.86% are urban inhabitants. With an area of 372.18 square kilometers, Antsokiyana Gemza has a population density of 212.51 people per square kilometer (550.39 people per square mile), which is greater than the Zone average of 115.3 people per square kilometer (298.63 people per square mile). A total of 18,710 households were counted in this district, resulting in an average of 4.23 persons to a household, and 18,130 housing units.The 1994 national census reported a total population for this district of 73,401 in 13,106 households, of whom 36,512 were men and 36,889 were women; 9,964 or 13.57% of its population were urban dwellers.

The two largest ethnic groups reported in 1994 in Antsokiyana Gemza were Amharas (97.63%), and Oromos (2.25%); all other ethnic groups made up 0.12% of the population. Amharic was spoken as a first language by 97.59%, and 2.31% spoke the Oromo language; the remaining 0.1% spoke all other primary languages reported. The majority of the inhabitants were Orthodox Tewahedo, with 75.98% reporting that as their religion, while 23.15% were Muslim, and 0.82% Protestant. This had shifted somewhat by 2007, with 74.35% reporting that as their religion, while 23.83% of the population said they were Muslim and 1.81% were P'ent'ay (Pentacostal Christian).

== Works cited ==
- Huntingford, George Wynn Brereton (1989). The Historical Geography of Ethiopia: From the First Century Ad to 1704. British Academy. ISBN 978-0-19-726055-5.
