= Amba Mariam =

Village in central Ethiopia; capital of the Ethiopian Empire

Amba Mariam ዐምባ ማሪያም
- Location in Ethiopia
- Coordinates: 11°12′34″N 39°13′36″E
- Country: Ethiopia
- Region: Amhara
- Zone: Debub Wollo

Population (2005)
  - Total: 1,899 (est)

Amba Mariam (Amharic: ዐምባ ማሪያም) is a village in central Ethiopia, in the Debub Wollo Zone of the Amhara Region.

Based on figures from the Central Statistical Agency in 2005, this town has an estimated total population of 1,899, of whom 988 were males and 911 were females. The 1994 census reported this town had a total population of 1,091, of whom 520 were males and 571 were females. It is one of three towns in Tenta woreda.
