= Berhanena Selam Printing Enterprise =

Ethiopian state-owned publisher

- ብርሃንና ሰላም ማተሚያ ድርጅት
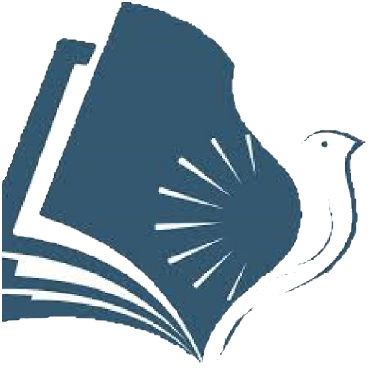
- Abbreviation: BSPE
- Formation: 13 September 1921; 105 years ago
- Type: State-owned enterprise
- Purpose: National publisher
- Headquarters: Arat Kilo, Arada, Addis Ababa, Ethiopia
- Region served: Ethiopia
- Products: Newspapers, books, magazines, and official, secure receipts
- Owner: Ethiopian government
- Chairman: Worku Guangul
- Deputy Chair: Kefyalew Birhanu
- CEO: Shitahun Wale
- Staff: ~ 890 (2024/25)
- Website: ethbspe.org/en_US/
- Formerly called: Teferi Mekonnen Printing Enterprise

Berhanena Selam Printing Enterprise (Amharic: ብርሃንና ሰላም ማተሚያ ድርጅት; BSPE) is the first modern national publisher in Ethiopia established in 1921 by Ras Tafari Mekonnen (Haile Selassie). It offers printing press media and comprehensive commercial, high-volume, and security printing services, including printing newspapers, books, magazines, and official, secure receipts.

Its headquarters are located in Arat Kilo, Addis Ababa.

== History ==
Established on 13 September 1921 as Teferi Mekonnen Printing Enterprise, Berhanena Selam Printing Enterprise is the first modern publisher using printing press in Ethiopia, established by Ras Teferi Mekonnen (Haile Selassie). In 1924, it began publishing the first newspaper called Berhanena Selam. In 1942, Berhanena Selam was transferred to Ministry of Pen and included to Haile Selassie I Charity Organization in 1957.

Berhanena Selam Printing Enterprise became state-owned enterprise in 1974 following the Ethiopian Revolution. Berhanena Selam contributed to political and educational documentation in Ethiopia that spanned over more than decades. Its headquarter is located in Arat Kilo, Addis Ababa.
