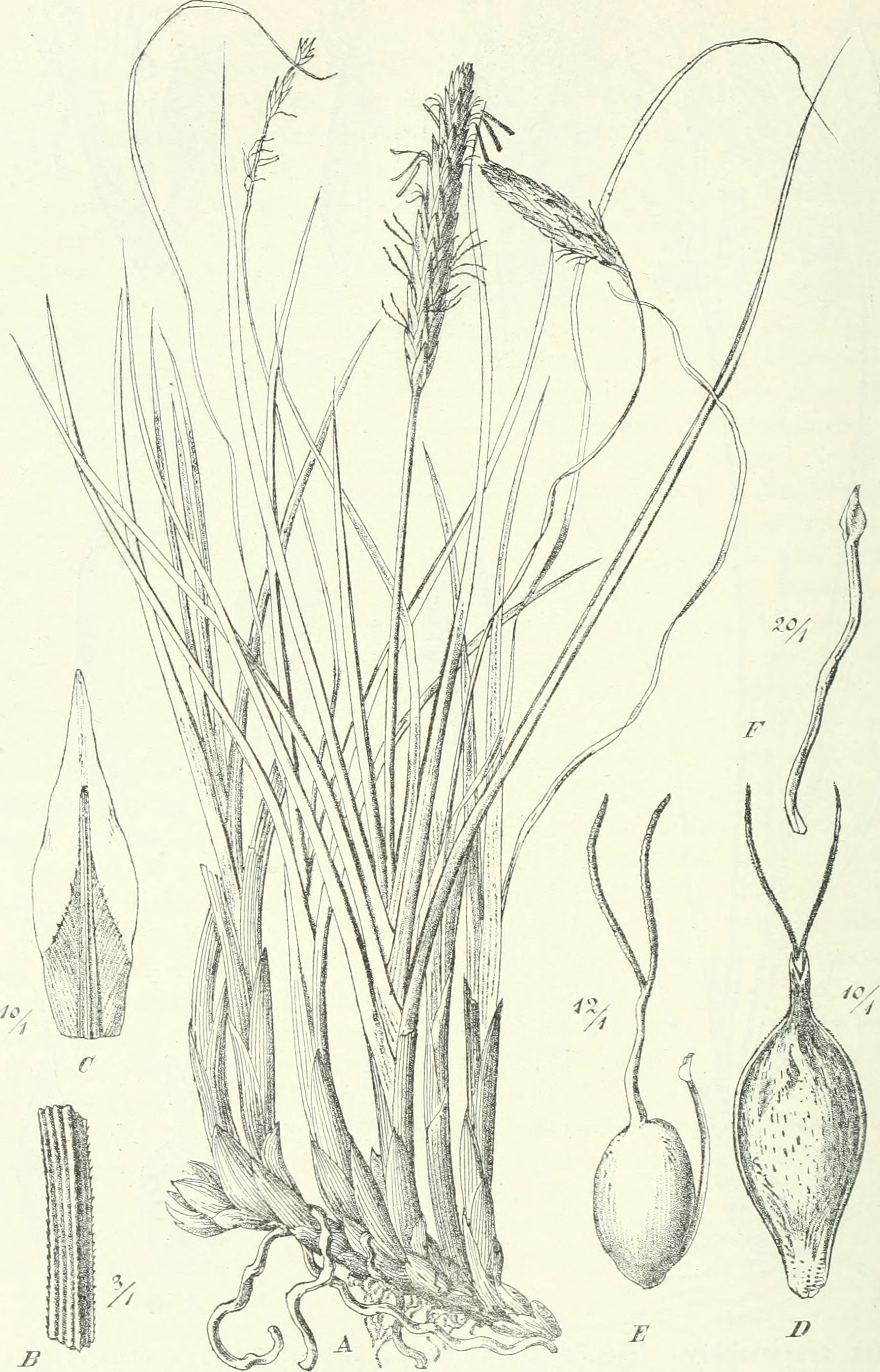

Conservation status
- Vulnerable (IUCN 3.1)

Scientific classification
- Kingdom: Plantae
- Clade: Tracheophytes
- Clade: Angiosperms
- Clade: Monocots
- Clade: Commelinids
- Order: Poales
- Family: Cyperaceae
- Genus: Carex
- Subgenus: Carex subg. Vignea
- Section: Carex sect. Longespicatae
- Species: C. monostachya

Binomial name
- Carex monostachya A.Rich.

= Carex monostachya =

Species of sedge

Carex monostachya is a species of sedge native to the mountains of East Africa.

== Distribution and ecology ==
Carex monostachya lives at altitudes of 2,700–4,000 metres (8,900–13,100 ft) above sea level in Afromontane region, including Mount Kenya, the Aberdare Range and Mount Elgon. It grows in the upper bamboo and Hagenia forests, in grassland in the ericaceous belt, and in shallow water near glaciers.

Carex monostachya can be the dominant species in the bogs found on the mountains' higher reaches. Other plants found in the same habitat include the giant senecios of the genus Dendrosenecio, the gentian Swertia crassiuscula, the buttercup Ranunculus oreophytus and the thistle Carduus keniensis.

== Taxonomy ==
Carex monostachya was described by Achille Richard in 1850, in his Tentamen Florae Abyssinicae.
