= Gishe =

District in Amhara Region, Ethiopia

Gishe ግሼ Geshe, Gishe Rabel
- Woreda
- Location within Ethiopia
- Coordinates: 10°45′N 39°30′E
- Country: Ethiopia
- Region: Amhara
- Zone: North Shewa

Area
  - Total: 658.78 km^{2} (254.36 sq mi)

Population (2012 est.)
  - Total: 66,669
  - Density: 101.20/km^{2} (262.11/sq mi)

Gishe (Amharic: ግሼ) also spelled as Geshe is a woreda in Amhara Region, Ethiopia. Located at the eastern edge of the Ethiopian Highlands in the Semien Shewa Zone, Gishe is bordered on the south by the Menz Gera Midir, on the west and north by the Debub Wollo Zone, and on the east by Antsokiyana Gemza; the Wanchet River defines its western boundary.

The name of this woreda is coming from the name of a district of the former province or kingdom of Shewa, Gishe Rabel. It contains parts of Abuye Meda, the largest plateau of Semien Shewa Zone. The administrative center of Gishe is Rabel.

Other settlements in the woreda includes Darat, Dasa, Melek Ãmba, Seya, Wembada and Zoga Ãmba.

Elevations in Gishe range from about 1200 meters along the Wanchet to over 3000 meters above sea level in the ridge of mountains that run near the eastern border of this woreda. Rivers include the Albuko, Yasha, Wayit, Kechine and Yada rivers.

== Demographics ==
A 2012 estimate puts the population at 66,669. This gives a population density of 101.20 people per square kilometer (262.11 people per square mile), given its area of 658.78 square kilometers (254.36 square miles), lower than the North Shewa Zone average of 126.20 people per square kilometer (326.87 people per square mile).

Based on the 2007 national census conducted by the Central Statistical Agency of Ethiopia (CSA), this woreda has a total population of 61,521, an increase of 19.97% over the 1994 census, of whom 30,448 are men and 31,073 women; 2,774 or 4.51% are urban inhabitants. With an area of 658.78 square kilometers, Gishe Rabel has a population density of 93.39 people per square kilometer (241.87 people per square mile), which is less than the Zone average of 115.3 people per square kilometer (298.63 people per square mile). A total of 13,691 households were counted in this woreda, resulting in an average of 4.49 persons to a household, and 13,199 housing units.

The 1994 national census reported a total population for this woreda of 51,283 in 10,715 households, of whom 25,574 were men and 25,709 were women; 1,113 or 2.17% of its population were urban dwellers.

The largest ethnic group reported in Gishe Rabel in 1994 was the Amhara (99.93%), and Amharic was spoken as a first language by 99.94%. The majority of the inhabitants practiced Ethiopian Orthodox Christianity, with 95.56% reporting that as their religion, while 4.26% were Muslim. By 2007 this was mostly the same, with 95.68% reporting Ethiopian Orthodox Christianity as their religion, while 4.01% of the population said they were Muslim.
