= Termaber =

District in Amhara Region, Ethiopia

Tarmaber ጣርማበር
- Woreda
- Location within Ethiopia Location within the Horn of Africa Location within Africa
- Coordinates: 9°50′55″N 39°43′58″E
- Country: Ethiopia
- Region: Amhara
- Zone: North Shewa

Area
  - Total: 543.33 km^{2} (209.78 sq mi)

Population (2012 est.)
  - Total: 92,537
  - Density: 170.31/km^{2} (441.11/sq mi)

Termaber (var. Tarmaber; Amharic: ጠርማበር) is a woreda in Amhara Region, Ethiopia. It includes a homonymous mountain pass and road tunnel. Located at the eastern edge of the Ethiopian Highlands in the Semien Shewa Zone, Termaber is bordered on the south by Ankober, on the southwest by Basona Werana, on the west by Mojana Wadera, on the northwest by Menz Mam Midir, on the northeast by Kewet, and on the southeast by the Afar Region. Towns in this woreda include Debre Sina and Doqaqit.

This woreda was originally named Mafud Mezezo Mojana, which is the name the 1994 national census used for it, but the name was changed at some point over the next five years. In 1999, the woreda of Mojana Wadera was split off from Termaber, and a kebele transferred to it from Kewet.

Tegulet, the ancient residence of the Ethiopian and Shewan rulers, is believed to lie in this woreda. Tegulet later served as center of the Sultanate of Showa, with its capital of "Siyon" (Zion, also known as "Marade") located in the area. Another capital of the Sultanate, Walale, is said to have been north of Debre Birhan. Wedem Arad later made it the center of his kingdom after Showa's fall and Debre Birhan would be founded by Zara Yaqob nearby, serving as the base of him and his descendants, the later Meridazmatches. Rivers in this woreda include the Mofar.

== Demographics ==
A 2012 estimate puts the population at 92,537. This gives a population density of 170.31 people per square kilometer (441.11 people per square mile), given its area of 543.33 square kilometers (209.78 square miles), higher than the North Shewa Zone average of 126.20 people per square kilometer (326.87 people per square mile).

Based on the 2007 national census conducted by the Central Statistical Agency of Ethiopia (CSA), this woreda has a total population of 84,481, an increase of over the 1994 census, of whom 42,812 are men and 41,669 women; 10,304 or 12.20% are urban inhabitants. With an area of 543.33 square kilometers, Termaber has a population density of 155.49 people per square kilometer (402.71 people per square mile), which is greater than the Zone average of 115.3 people per square kilometer (298.63 people per square mile). A total of 19,993 households were counted in this woreda, resulting in an average of 4.23 persons to a household, and 19,370 housing units.

The 1994 national census reported a total population for this woreda of 99,402 in 17,787 households, of whom 51,537 were men and 47,865 were women; 8,378 or 8.43% of its population were urban dwellers.

The three largest ethnic groups reported in Termaber were the Amhara (93.78%), the Oromo (3.11%), and the Argobba (2.65%); all other ethnic groups made up 0.46% of the population. Amharic was spoken as a first language by 96.93%, and Oromiffa was spoken by 2.76%; the remaining 0.31% spoke all other primary languages reported. The majority of the inhabitants in 1994 practiced Ethiopian Orthodox Christianity, with 94.74% reporting that as their religion, while 5.15% were Muslim. By 2007 this had changed somewhat, with 97.43% reporting Ethiopian Orthodox Christianity as their religion, while only 2.37% of the population said they were Muslim.
