= Wanchet River =

River in central Ethiopia

Wanchet River Wonchit

Location
- Country: Ethiopia

Physical characteristics
- Source
  - coordinates: 10°56′12.545″N 39°34′13.508″E
  - elevation: 3,030 m (9,940 ft)
- Mouth: Jamma River
  - coordinates: 10°3′52.466″N 38°40′0.631″E
  - elevation: 1,167 m (3,829 ft)
- Basin size: 4,200 km^{2} (1,600 sq mi)

Basin features
- Progression: Jamma → Blue Nile → Nile → Mediterranean Sea
- River system: Nile Basin
- Population: 818,000
- Tributaries
  - left: Qechene River
  - right: Jara

Wanchet River is a river of central Ethiopia, and a tributary of the Jamma River. Along with the Adabay River, it defined the border of the former district of Marra Biete.

Its crossing "Aqui afagi" (Aheya Fajj, Amharic "destroyer of donkeys") is mentioned in the account of Portuguese explorer Francisco Álvares, who crossed it several times in the first quarter of the 16th century.

== See also ==
- List of rivers of Ethiopia
