= Jamma River =

River in Ethiopia

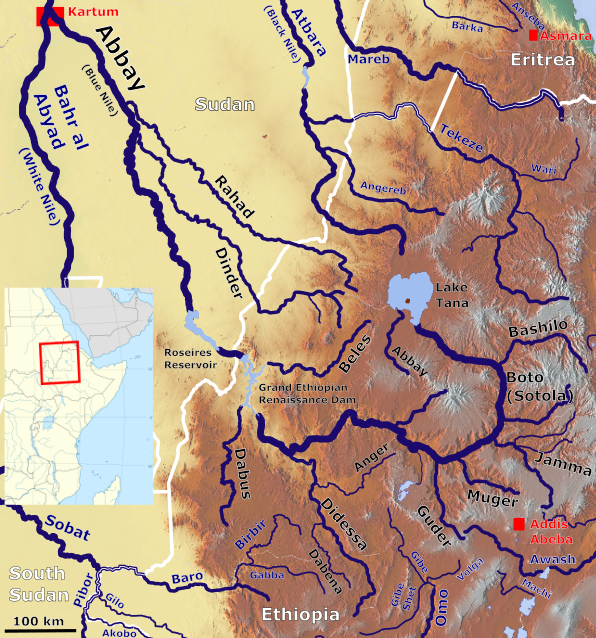
- Map showing the Abbay basin, with the Jamma River (bottom right)

Location
- Country: Ethiopia

Physical characteristics
- Mouth: Blue Nile
  - coordinates: 10.1572°N 38.3412°E
- Basin size: 15,782 km^{2} (6,093 sq mi)

Basin features
- Progression: Blue Nile → Nile → Mediterranean Sea
- River system: Nile Basin

The Jamma River (Amharic: ጃማ) is a river in central Ethiopia and a tributary to the Abay (or Blue Nile). It drains parts of the Semien Shewa Zones of the Amhara and Oromia Regions. The Upper Jamma flows through steep, deep canyons cut first through volcanic rock and then through the Cretaceous sandstone and shaly sandstone, with Jurassic limestone at the bottom. It has a drainage area of about 15,782 square kilometers in size. Tributaries include the Wanchet.

The earliest mention of this river is in the Gadla of Tekle Haymanot, which was written in the fourteenth century. One of the earliest European mentions is by the missionary Pedro Páez, who was the first European to see and describe the origin of the Abay. According to Johann Ludwig Krapf, in the 1840s the Jamma defined the boundary between Marra Biete and Moret, two districts of the former province or Sultanate of Shewa.
