= Qechene River =

River in central Ethiopia

Qechene River Kechinie, Katchenee

Location
- Country: Ethiopia

Physical characteristics
- Mouth: Wanchet River
  - coordinates: 10.439536°N 39.463768°E
  - elevation: 1,832 m (6,010 ft)
- Basin size: 511 km^{2} (197 sq mi)

Basin features
- Progression: Wanchet → Jamma → Blue Nile → Nile → Mediterranean Sea
- River system: Nile Basin
- Population: 71,600

Qechene River is a river of central Ethiopia. It rises near Aiamsa in the Annas Mountains, and flows to the west to join the Wanchet. The watercourse's tributaries include the Ketama and Woia. According to Johann Ludwig Krapf (who calls it the "Katchenee"), the Qechene defines the boundary between the Shewan districts of Gishe and Menz.

== See also ==
- List of rivers of Ethiopia
