= Amba Ferit =

Mountain in Ethiopia

Amba Farit
- Location within Ethiopia

Highest point
- Elevation: 4,270 m (14,010 ft)
- Prominence: 1,919 m (6,296 ft)
- Isolation: 132 km (82 mi)
- Listing: Ultra; Ribu
- Coordinates: 10°57′3″N 39°6′17″E

Geography
- Location: Ethiopia
- Parent range: Central Ethiopian Highlands

Amba Farit is a mountain located in Amhara, Ethiopia. Amba Farit is an ultra-prominent peak and is the 18th highest in Africa. It is the highest point of the Ahmar Mountains. It has an elevation of 4,270 m (14,010 ft).

== See also ==
List of Ultras of Africa
