= North Shewa Zone (Amhara) =

Zone in Amhara Region of Ethiopia

Coordinates: 10°00′N 39°30′E

North Shewa ሰሜን ሸዋ
- Zone
- Interactive map of North Shewa
- Country: Ethiopia
- Region: Amhara
- Largest city: Debre Berhan

Area
  - Total: 15,936.13 km^{2} (6,152.97 sq mi)

Population (2012)
  - Total: 2,011,197
  - Density: 126.2036/km^{2} (326.8658/sq mi)

A map of the regions and zones of Ethiopia

North Shewa (Amharic: ሰሜን ሸዋ, romanized: Semiēn Shewa) is a zone in the Amhara Region of Ethiopia. North Shewa takes its name from the kingdom and former province of Shewa. The Zone is bordered on the south and the west by the Oromia Region, on the north by South Wollo, on the northeast by the Oromia Zone, and on the east by the Afar Region. The highest point in the Zone is Mount Abuye Meda (4012 meters), which is found in the Gish woreda; other prominent peaks include Mount Megezez. Towns in North Shewa include Ankober, Debre Birhan, and Shewa Robit.

The administrative subdivisions of this Zone have been renamed, divided, and their boundaries were redrawn numerous times between the 1994 and 2007 national censuses far more often than any other Zone in the Amhara Region. As a result, its subdivisions can be very confusing; Svein Ege, in his comparison of how the Central Statistical Agency (CSA) and the Ethiopian Mapping Authority reported the administrative boundaries in this Zone and how they changed between 1994 and 2004, stopped halfway through this Zone, stating that he had run out of time to perform field checking.

== History ==
Northern Shewa the Amhara zone is the zone where the former kingdom, province currently zones of Shewa all started. The zone is also the launching pad for the expansion and annexation of the rest of southern Ethiopia. For example, R.H.Kofi Darkwah writes that "like his father before him, the major conquests of Sahla Selassie were made in the south and south west." Sahla Selassie is the grandfather of Menelik II. (Shewa Menilek and the Ethiopian Empire(1813-1889) page 26.).

== Demographics ==
The zone had an estimated population of 3,550,000 in 2020. This would put the estimated population density at 222.76 people per square kilometer (576.96 people per square mile), given its area of 15,936.13 square kilometers (6,152.97 square miles).

A 2012 census puts the population at 2,011,197. This gives a population density of 126.20 people per square kilometer (326.87 people per square mile).

Based on the 2007 Census conducted by the Central Statistical Agency of Ethiopia (CSA), this Zone has a total population of 1,837,490, an increase of 17.72% over the 1994 census, of whom 928,694 are men and 908,796 women. With an area of 15,936.13 square kilometers, North Shewa has a population density of 115.30 people per square kilometer (298.63 people per square mile). While 214,227 or 11.66% are urban inhabitants, a further 112 or 0.01% are pastoralists. A total of 429,423 households were counted in this Zone, which results in an average of 4.28 persons to a household, and 413,235 housing units.The 1994 national census reported a total population for this Zone of 1,560,916 in 340,413 households, of whom 784,207 were men and 776,709 women; 146,952 or 9.41% of its population were urban dwellers at the time.

The three largest ethnic groups reported in 1994 in North Shewa were the Amhara (93.87%), the Oromo (4.27%), and the Argobba (1.73%); all other ethnic groups made up 0.13% of the population. Amharic was spoken as a first language by 95.44%, and 4.38% spoke Oromiffa; the remaining 0.18% spoke all other primary languages reported. 94.56% practiced Ethiopian Orthodox Christianity, and 5.26% of the population said they were Muslim. In 2007, the three largest ethnic groups reported in North Shewa were the Amhara (90.73%), the Oromo (7.14%), and the Argobba (1.71%); all other ethnic groups made up 0.42% of the population. Amharic is spoken as a first language by 92.97%, and 6.32% spoke Oromiffa; the remaining 0.71% spoke all other primary languages reported. 94.71% of the population said they practiced Ethiopian Orthodox Christianity, and 4.91% were Muslim.

According to a May 24, 2004 World Bank memorandum, 4% of the inhabitants of North Shewa have access to electricity, this zone has a road density of 41.4 kilometers per 1000 square kilometers (compared to the national average of 30 kilometers), the average rural household has 1.2 hectares of land (compared to the national average of 1.01 hectare of land and an average of 0.75 for the Amhara Region) and the equivalent of 0.9 heads of livestock. 15.7% of the population is in non-farm related jobs, compared to the national average of 25% and a Regional average of 21%. 48% of all eligible children are enrolled in primary school, and 12% in secondary schools. 39% of the zone is exposed to malaria, and 14% to Tsetse fly. The memorandum gave this zone a drought risk rating of 487.
