= Bete Amhara =

Historical province in Amhara Region, Ethiopia

Bete Amhara ቤተ አማራ (Amharic) ቤተ ዐምሐራ (Ge'ez)
- Historical Province of Ethiopia
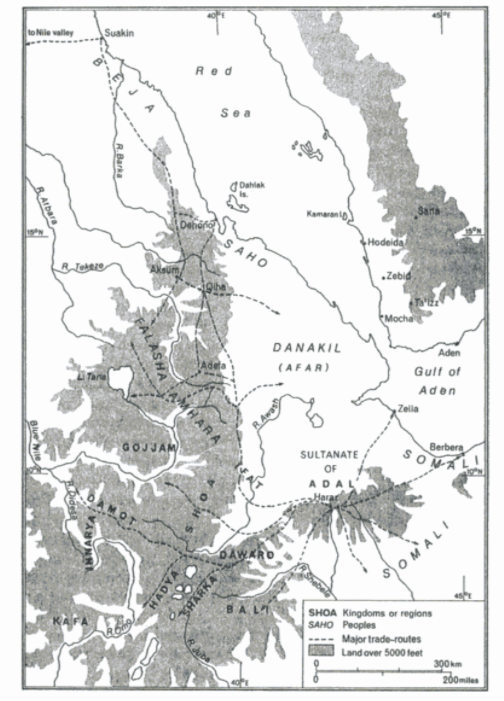
- Map of medieval kingdoms and regions alongside major trade routes in the Horn of Africa
- Country: Ethiopia
- Demonym: Amhara
- Time zone: UTC+3 (EAT)

Bete Amhara (Amharic: ቤተ አማራ, Ge'ez: ቤተ ዐምሐራ, translation: "House of Amhara") was a historical region located in north-central Ethiopia, covering most of the southern parts of the latter known Wollo Province, along with few parts of North Shewa. The state had 30 districts, including Ambassel, Lakomelza, Laikueyta, Tatakuyeta, Akamba, Ambassit, Atronsa Mariam, Genete, Feresbahir (most probably located in the northern part of Dessie, where there is a small lake called Feres Bahir or Bahir Shasho), Amba Gishen, Gishe Bere, Wasal, Wagada, Mecana-Selasse, , Amhara sayint, Zoramba, Daje, Demah, and Ewarza.

== History ==
The 13th-14th century hagiography of Amhara saint Tekle Haymanot traces Bete Amhara as far back as the mid 9th century AD as a location. With the rise of the Solomonic Dynasty in 1270 under Emperor Yekuno Amlak, and until the establishment of Gondar as the new imperial capital around 1600, the Debre-Birhan to Mekane-Selassie region (Werillu in Wollo) was the primary seat of the roving Amhara emperors. This period is most significant in the formation of the medieval Ethiopian state, the spread and consolidation of Ethiopian Orthodox Christianity (following the example set by the Zagwe kings in preserving the Axumite heritage) in Bete Amhara, Gojjam, Begemdir, northern Shewa, Gafat, and Damot (from Tigray, Wolkayt, and Lasta)

The region’s recorded history, in fact, goes back to the first decades of the 12th millennium. For example, St. George’s Church in the town of Woreilu (whose Tabot is reputed to have been carried by Emperor Menelik at the Battle of Adwa) was established around 1200. The parish of Mekane Selassie (መካነ ሥላሴ), near Neded and the home of the famous cathedral by the same name, served as a favorite royal playground. The construction of Mekane Selassie (meaning: the abode of the Trinity) was begun by Emperor Naod (1494-1508) and completed by his son Emperor Libna Dengel (royal nom-du-guerre, Wanag Seged). This was a year before the church (along with a large number of monasteries in the region) was sacked in 1531 by a destructive Ottoman-backed invasion. Francisco Alvarez, who had earlier visited the church, confirms that its size was some 150 feet by 150 feet—wholly covered in gold leaf, inlaid with gems, pearls and corals. Astounded by the wealth and workmanship, the Yemeni chronicler of Ahmed Gragn notes: "The imam asked all the Arabs who were with him, ‘Is there the like of this church, with its images and its gold, in Byzantium, or in India, or in any other place?' They replied, ‘We never saw or heard of its like in Byzantium or India or anywhere in the world.

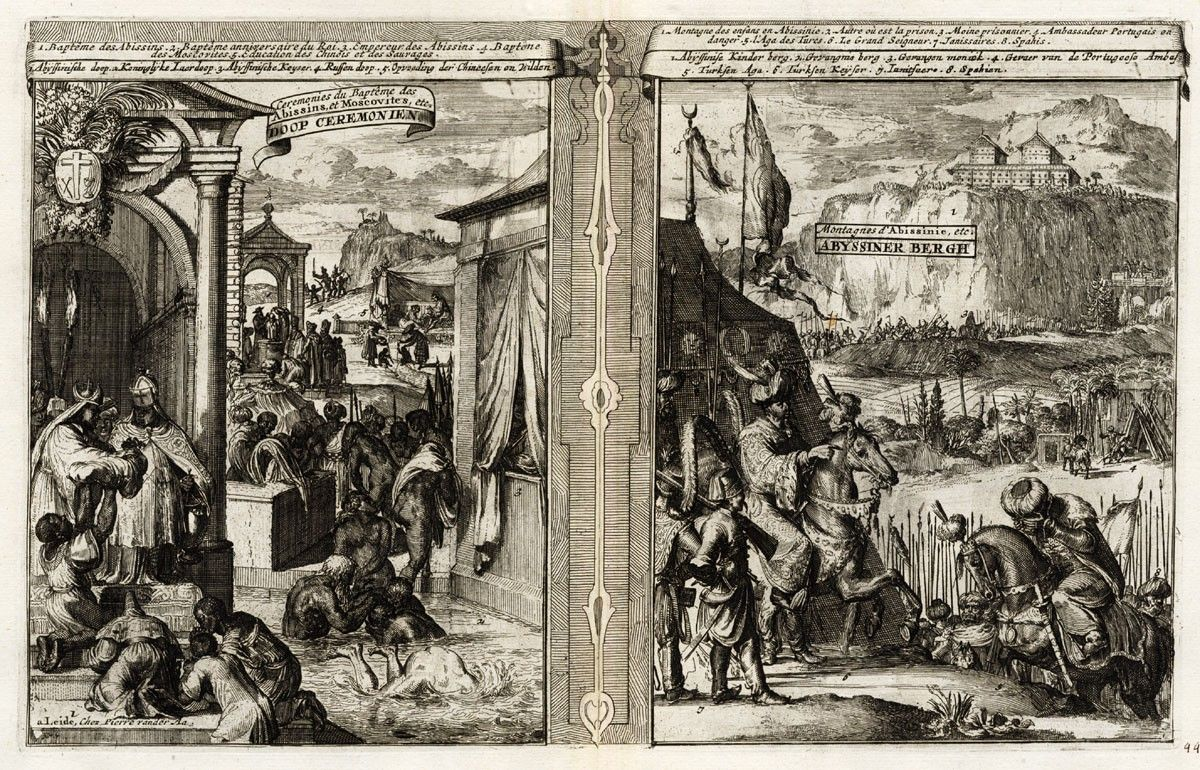
European depiction of Amba Geshen, captioned "Abyssinian mountain of children" in French and Dutch

Due to the origin of the Solomonic Dynasty in Bete Amhara, the regions rulers played a disproportionate role in the politics of the Ethiopian state. In the medieval era, the Tsahife Lam (ጻሕፈ ላም), governor of the Bete Amhara, was the most senior military officer next to the Emperor. Along with that, the Jantirar of Ambassel (the center of Bete Amhara and lordship of Yekuno Amlak himself prior to his ascension as Emperor of Ethiopia), was tasked with protecting Amba Geshen. One of the mountains of Ethiopia where most of the male heirs to the Solomonic Dynasty were interned, the Emperors also kept the imperial treasury there even after it was no longer a royal prison. According to "The Glorious Victories," the soldiers of Amda Seyon were from "Amhara and Sewä and Gojjam and Dämot, (men) who were trained in warfare, and dressed in gold and silver and fine clothes archers, spearmen, cavalry, and infantry with strong legs, trained for war. When they go to war they fight like eagles and run like wild goats; the (movement) of their feet is like the rolling of stones, and their sound is like the roaring of the sea, as says the prophet Herege'el: "I have heard the sound of the wings of the angels, as the noise of a camp." Such were the soldiers of 'Amda Seyon, full of confidence in war."

== Geography and ethnography ==
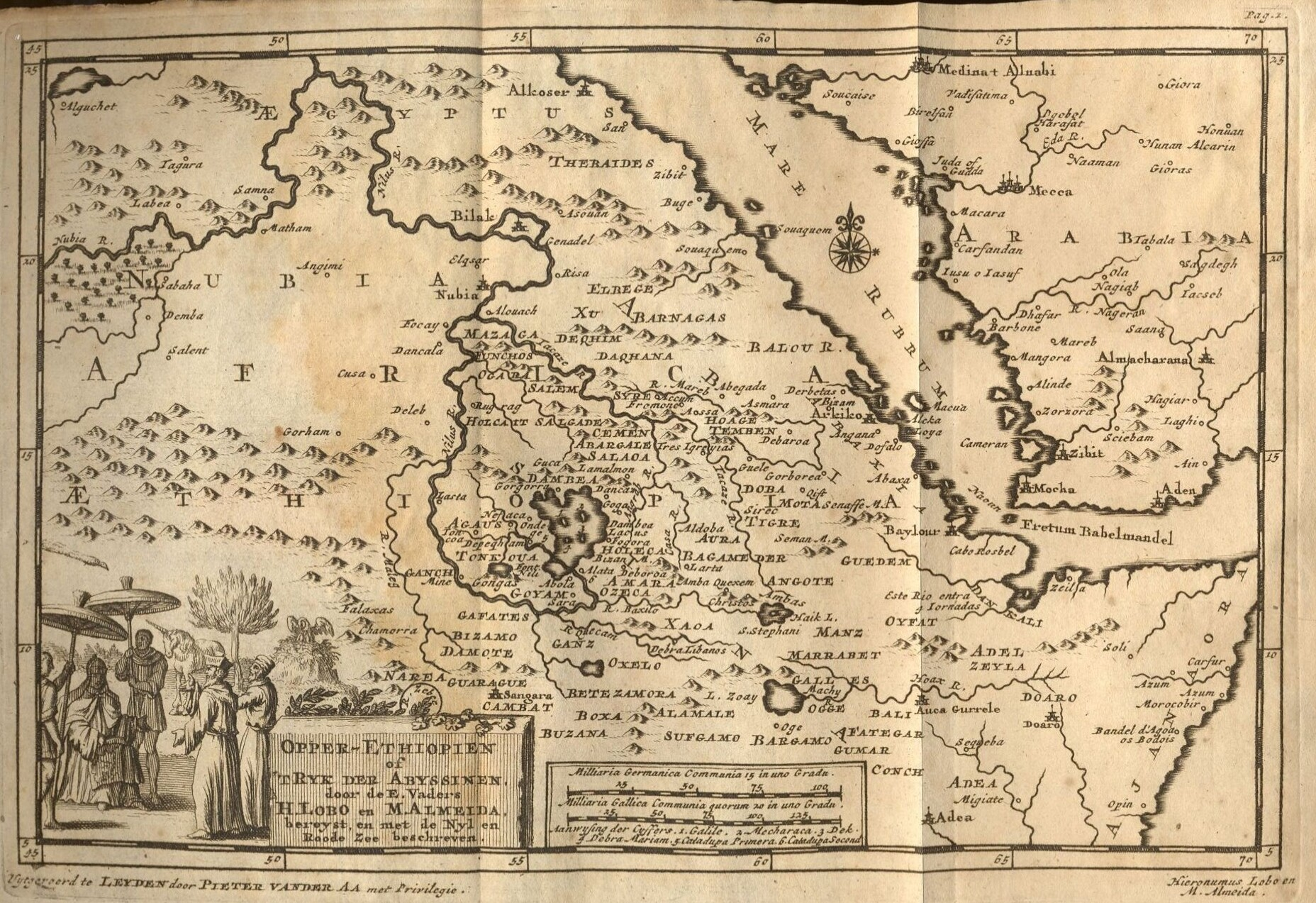
Map from the Dutch edition of Historia de Etiopía a Alta ou Abassia, by Lobo & Manuel de Almeida

Bete Amhara was bounded on the west by the Abbay, on the south by the river Wanchet, on the north by the Bashilo-Mille River, and on the east by the Escarpment that separate it from the Afar Desert. The hagiography of Tekle Haymanot states the kingdom was bordered, if only partially, to the south by Damot according to E. A. Wallis Budge.

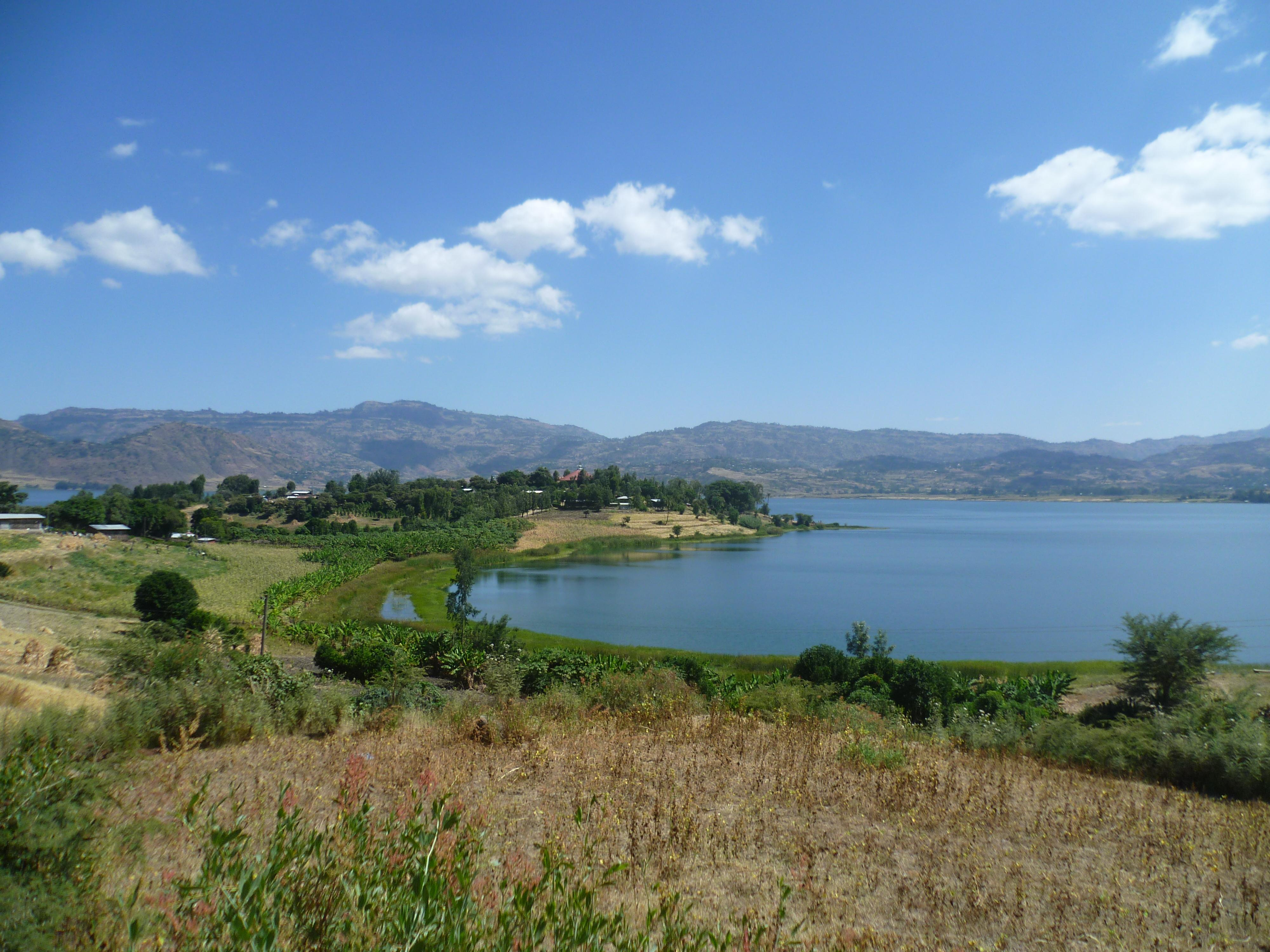
Lake Hayq

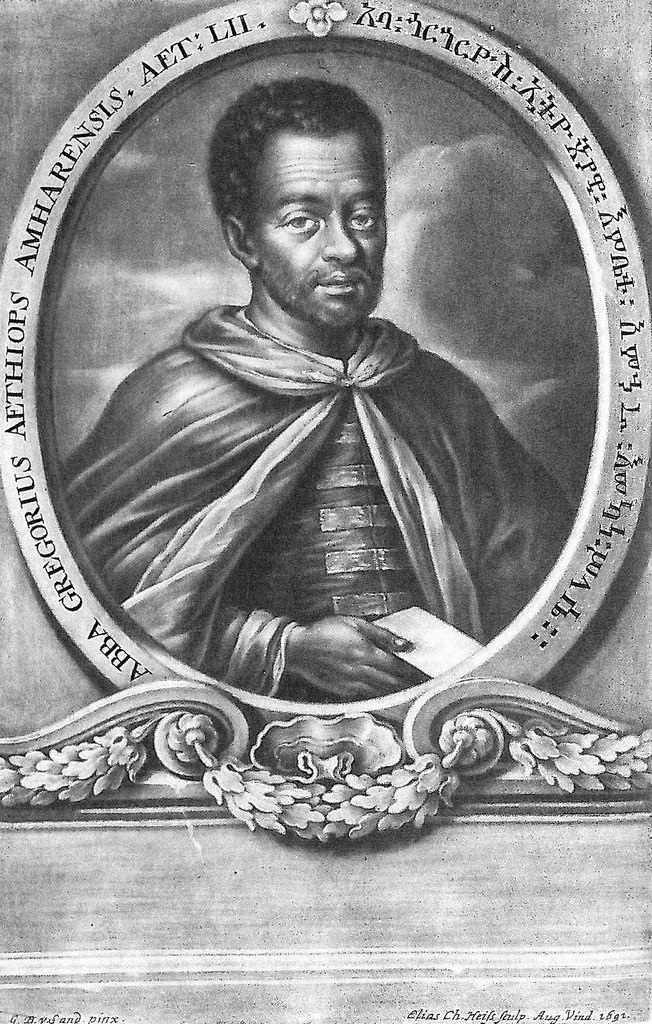
Aba Gorgorios engraving by Christopher Elias Heiss, Augsburg, 1691

The region is the source of much of Ethiopia's clothing culture, eating culture, language, education system. An example is the fundamental modal system used by music of the Ethiopian highlands called qenet, of which there are four main modes: tezeta, bati, ambassel, and anchihoy. Abba Gregorius (1596-1658), the famous monk whose Jesuit association and global travels disseminated invaluable knowledge overseas about Ethiopia, is said to hail from Woreilu. In a 1650 letter to the German scholar Hiob Ludolf (1624-1704), the Ethiopologist deservedly known as the father of Ethiopian Studies, Abba Gregorius describes himself as follows:

"As to my origins, do not imagine, my friend, that they are humble, for I am of the House of Amhara which is a respected tribe; from it come the heads of the Ethiopian people, the governors, the military commanders, the judges and the advisers of the King of Ethiopia who appoint and dismiss, command and rule in the name of the King, his governors, and grandees.”

According to 19th century traveler William Cornwallis Harris, "Amhára" was a term held synonymous with "Christian," evidence that (the province) "must formerly have exerted preeminent influence in the empire."

=== Religion ===
The dominant religion of the region was Christianity, in the form of Ethiopian Orthodoxy. As the state religion, the Ethiopian Orthodox Tewahedo Church played a critical role in the development of the region as a whole.

== See also ==
- Amhara people
- Amhara Province
- Amhara Region
