= Lake Ardibbo =

Lake in Amhara Region, Ethiopia

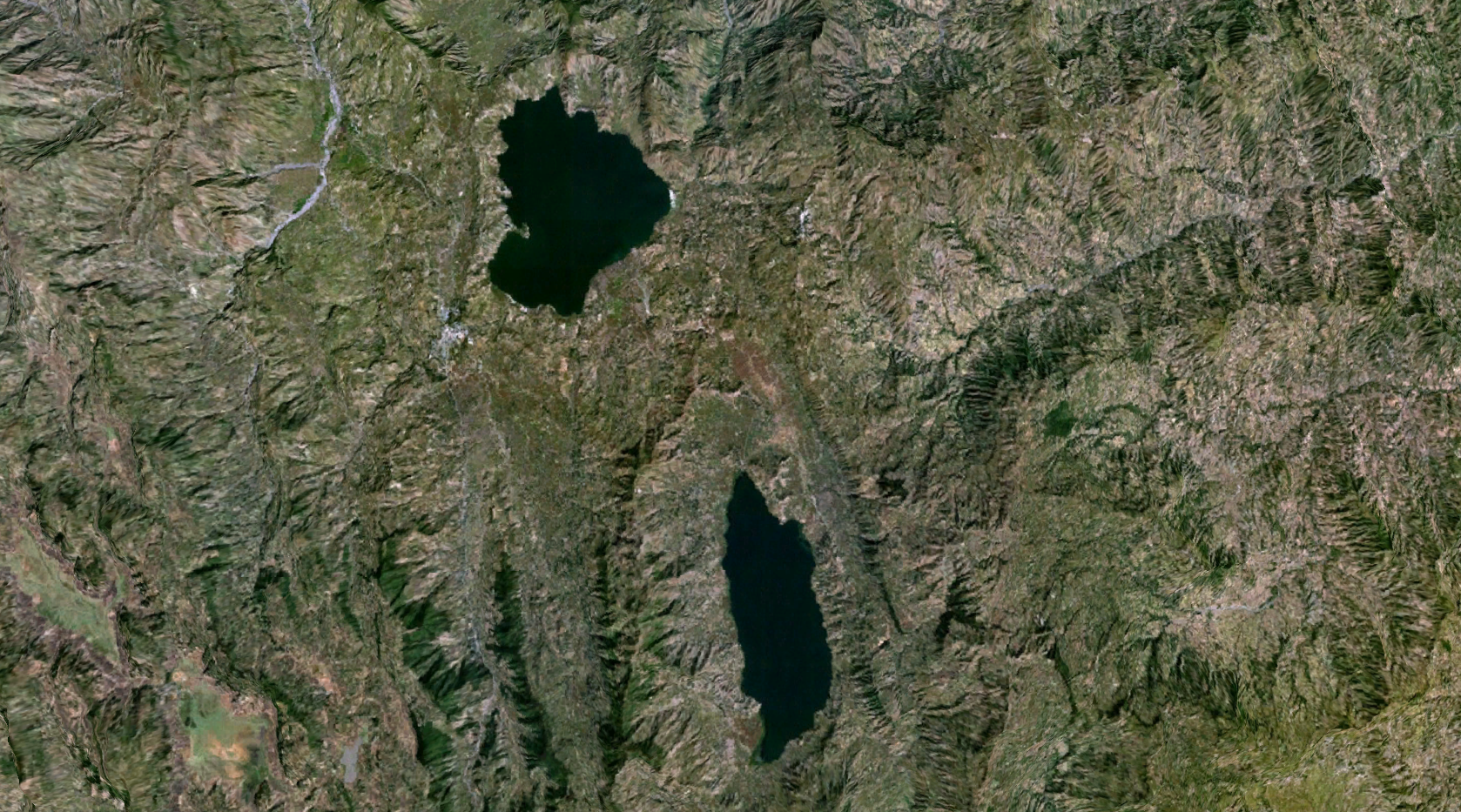
- Lake Ardibbo (bottom) with Lake Hayq (top)

- Location within Ethiopia
- Location: Tehuledere, Debub Wollo Zone, Amhara Region
- Coordinates: 11°14′N 39°45′E
- Basin countries: Ethiopia

Lake Ardibbo is a freshwater lake of Ethiopia. It is located north of Dessie, in the Debub Wollo Zone of the Amhara Region. It is situated about five kilometers southeast of Lake Hayq; both lakes are in Tehuledere woreda.

This lake is smaller in size than Lake Hayq and flows into Hayq via the Anchercah River.
