= Hayq =

Hayq may refer to

- Hayk‘, the native name of Armenia
- H.A.Y.Q., Armenian rap band
- Mets Hayq Recordz, Armenian rap band
- Lake Hayq, Ethiopia
- Hayq, Ethiopia a town near Lake Hayq
