= Were Babu =

Coordinates: 11°40′N 39°45′E

Warra Babo
- Woreda
- Flag
- Interactive map of Warra Babo
- Country: Ethiopia
- Region: Amhara
- Zone: Debub Wollo

Area
  - Total: 714.28 km^{2} (275.79 sq mi)

Population (2012 est.)
  - Total: 149,365

Warra Babo (Amharic: ወረ ባቦ) is one of the woredas in the Amhara Region of Ethiopia. This woreda is named for one of the "Houses" or subgroups of the Wollo Oromo that used to govern the area and is still located there. For instance, in certain areas of kebeles 07, 08, 010, 011, and 014, Afaan Oromo continues to be utilized as the primary language. Part of the Debub Wollo Zone, Warra Babo is bordered on the south by Qalu, on the west by Tehuledere, on the north by the Mille River which separates it from the Semien Wollo Zone, on the east by the Afar Region, and on the southeast by the Mi'aa River which separates it from the Oromia Zone. The administrative center of Warra Babo is Bistima; other towns include Goha, Ejersa, Arabati and Bokeksa.

The western part of Warra Babo lies in the Ethiopian Highlands, with the eastern part stretching down to the lowlands of the Afar Region; elevations range from 700 meters above sea level where the Mille leaves the woreda to 2700 meters at its southernmost point. Rivers include Laga Wakalo and the Burqa.

== Demographics ==
Based on the 2007 national census conducted by the Central Statistical Agency of Ethiopia (CSA), this woreda has a total population of 100,530, an increase of 11.22% over the 1994 census, of whom 50,459 are men and 50,071 women; 6,726 or 6.69% are urban inhabitants. With an area of 714.28 square kilometers, Were Babu has a population density of 140.74, which is less than the Zone average of 147.58 persons per square kilometer. A total of 23,910 households were counted in this woreda, resulting in an average of 4.2 persons to a household, and 23,201 housing units. The majority of the inhabitants were Muslim, with 97.88% reporting that as their religion, while 2.01% of the population said they practiced Ethiopian Orthodox Christianity.

The 1994 national census reported a total population for this woreda of 90,386 in 19,733 households, of whom 44,737 were men and 45,649 were women; 4,539 or 5.02% of its population were urban dwellers. The two largest ethnic groups reported in Were Babu were the Amhara (97.76%), and the Oromo (2.18%); all other ethnic groups made up 0.06% of the population. Amharic was spoken as a first language by 95.91%, and 4% spoke Oromiffa; the remaining 0.09% spoke all other primary languages reported. The majority of the inhabitants were Muslim, with 97.6% of the population reported as practicing that belief, while 2.37% of the population said they professed Ethiopian Orthodox Christianity.
