= Yisma Nigus =

Historical site in Ethiopia

Coordinates: 11.487937°N 39.621123°E

Yisma Nigus (Note: In Amharic: ይስማ ንጉስ) (or Yisma Negus) is an Ethiopian historical site where the Treaty of Wuchale (Note: In Amharic: የውጫሌው ስምምነት; in Italian: Trattato di Uccialli) was signed by Menelik II (King of Shewa, later Emperor of Ethiopia) and Count Pietro Antonelli of Italy on 2 May 1889. Disputes over the treaty would later lead to the First Italo-Ethiopian War.

It is located in South Wollo, Ethiopia, about 6 km away from a town of Wuchale.
