= Tehuledere =

District in Amhara Region, Ethiopia

Coordinates: 11°30′N 39°35′E

Tehuledere ተሁለደሬ
- Woreda
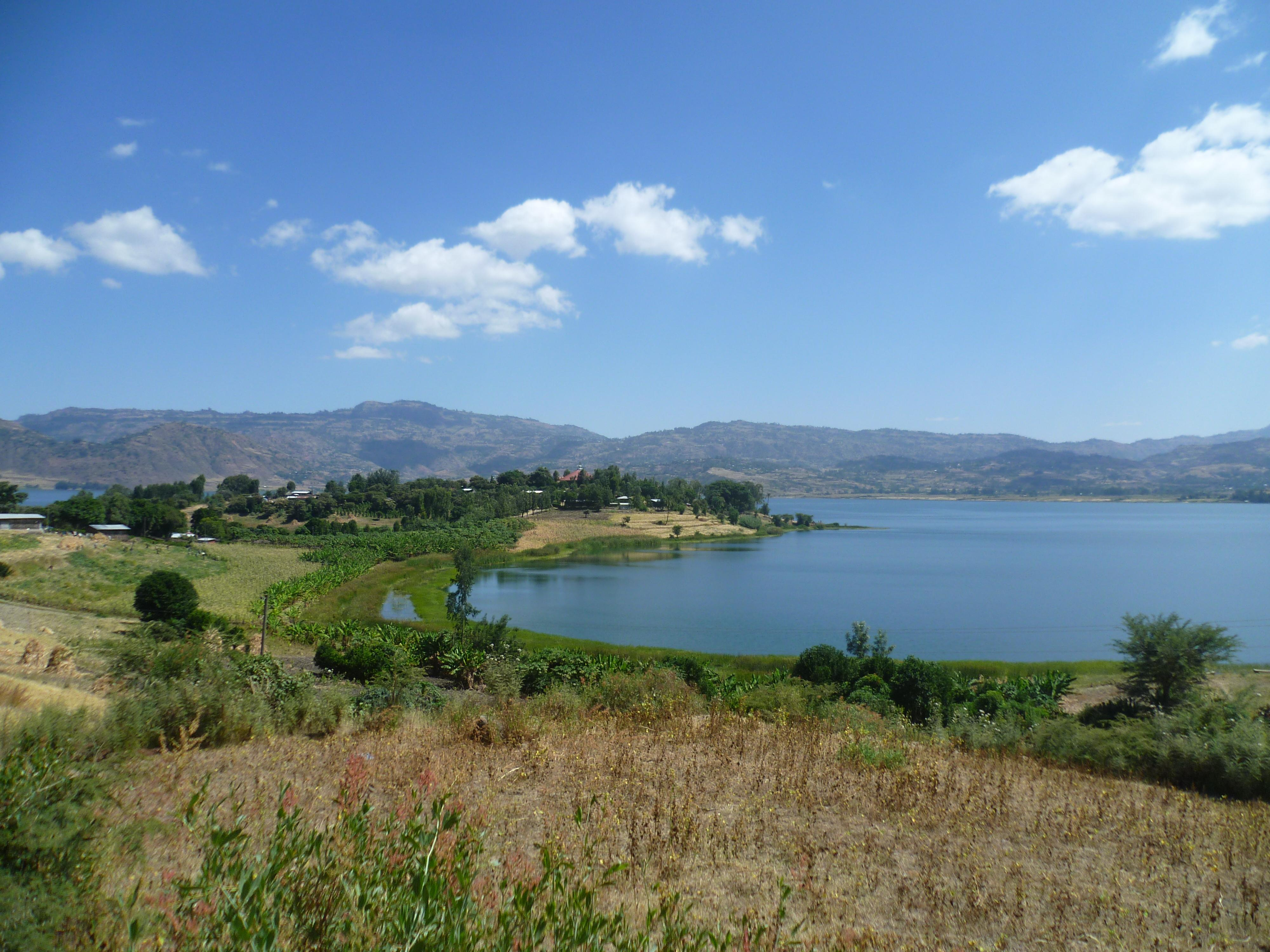

- Flag
- Interactive map of Tehuledere
- Country: Ethiopia
- Region: Amhara
- Zone: Debub Wollo

Area
  - Total: 405.37 km^{2} (156.51 sq mi)

Population (2012 est.)
  - Total: 129,173
  - Density: 318.65/km^{2} (825.31/sq mi)

Tehuledere (Amharic: ተሁለደሬ) is a woreda in Amhara Region, Ethiopia. Located at the eastern edge of the Ethiopian Highlands in the Debub Wollo Zone, Tehuledere is bordered on the south by Dessie Zuria, on the southwest by Kutaber, on the northwest and the north by the Mille River, on the northeast by Were Babu, and on the southeast by Kalu; the Mille separates Tehuledere from Amba Sel to the northwest and the Semien Wollo Zone to the north. Towns in Tehuledere include Hayq, Paso Mille, and Sulula.

== Overview ==
The altitude of Tehuledere ranges from 500 meters above sea level along the boundary with the Debub Wollo Zone to 2700 meters along its southwest border. The hydrology of this woreda includes two lakes: Hayq, which lies entirely within it, and Ardibbo which lies to the south of Hayq, defining part of the border with Kalu. Other notable landmarks include the monasteries of Debre Egziabeher and Istifanos.

The NGO Agri-Service Ethiopia, announced in November 2006 that they had started projects to improve food security and infrastructure in Tehuledere, with a total budget of over 7.1 million birr. Some 44,803 inhabitants in six selected rural kebeles would benefit from this project.

== Demographics ==
A 2012 estimate puts the population at 128,173. This gives a population density of 318.65 people per square kilometer (825.31 people per square mile), given its area of 405.37 square kilometers (156.51 square miles), nearly twice the South Wollo Zone average of 161.49 people per square kilometer (418.56 people per square mile).

Based on the 2007 national census conducted by the Central Statistical Agency of Ethiopia (CSA), this woreda has a total population of 117,877, a decrease of 1.14% from the 1994 census, of whom 59,300 are men and 58,577 women; 14,745 or 12.51% are urban inhabitants. With an area of 405.37 square kilometers, Tehuledere has a population density of 290.79, which is greater than the Zone average of 147.58 persons per square kilometer. A total of 28,780 households were counted in this woreda, resulting in an average of 4.1 persons to a household, and 27,643 housing units. The majority of the inhabitants were Muslim, with 90.43% reporting that as their religion, while 9.35% of the population said they practiced Ethiopian Orthodox Christianity. The 1994 national census reported a total population for this woreda of 119,240 in 23,148 households, of whom 58,776 were men and 60,464 were women; 11,788 or 9.89% of its population were urban dwellers.

In 1994 the largest ethnic group reported in Tehuledere was the Amhara (99.42%). Amharic was spoken as a first language by 99.47%. The majority of the inhabitants were Muslim, with 89.03% of the population reported as practicing that belief, while 10.44% of the population said they professed Ethiopian Orthodox Christianity. This had changed little by 2007, with 90.43% reporting Islam as their religion, while 9.35% of the population said they practiced Ethiopian Orthodox Christianity.
