= Käfär-Wedem =

According to legend, Käfär-Wedem was a governor of Adamo in present-day Ethiopia possibly living in the 13th century. After being baptized by Saint Täklä-Haymanot, his name became Gäbrä-Wahed, his wife's name Wälättä-Wahed and his son's name Täklä-Wahed.
