= Tchika Beret =

Ancient settlement in Ethiopia

- Location within Ethiopia Location within the Horn of Africa Location within Africa
- 11.05°N 39.783333°E
- Type: Settlement
- Location: Ethiopia
- Region: Amhara Region
- Part of: Kingdom of Aksum

History
- Built: 4th century AD

Tchika-Beret or Chiqa Beret is the ruins of an ancient Christian settlement dating back to the Aksumite period lying just 10 km south east of Kombolcha, on the outskirts of Ancharo. The area most notably possesses the Geta Lion Statue, a stone sculpture of a lion's head on the top of a hill that dates back to the early 4th century.

The area was excavated by French archeologist Francis Anfray in 1964, who described it as "some remains of Christian settlements around the vicinity of Kombolcha." He also notes that on the stone's base of the lion sculpture was an engraving of a Christian cross, on both sides of the cross were two heavily eroded pre-Christian monograms. Similar monograms were found in the coinage of King Wazeba of Axum, which suggests that the statue was constructed during his reign in the early 4th century AD.
