= Wollo Province =

Historical province in Amhara Region, Ethiopia

Coordinates: 11°30′N 40°00′E

Wello during the reign of Haile Selassie

Wollo (Amharic: ወሎ) was a historical province of northern Ethiopia. During the Middle Ages this province name was Bete Amhara and it was the centre of the Solomonic emperors. Bete Amhara had an illustrious place in Ethiopian political and cultural history. It was the center of the Solomonic Dynasty established by Emperor Yekuno Amlak around Lake Hayq in 1270. Bete Amhara was bounded on the west by the Abbay, on the south by the river Wanchet, on the north by the Bashilo River and on the east by the Escarpment that separate it from the Afar Desert.

The original Wollo province was mainly only the area of modern-day South Wollo. But in the 1940s, under Emperor Haile Selassie, administration changes were made and provinces such as Lasta, Angot (now known as Raya), and parts of Afar lands were incorporated into Wollo.

== History ==
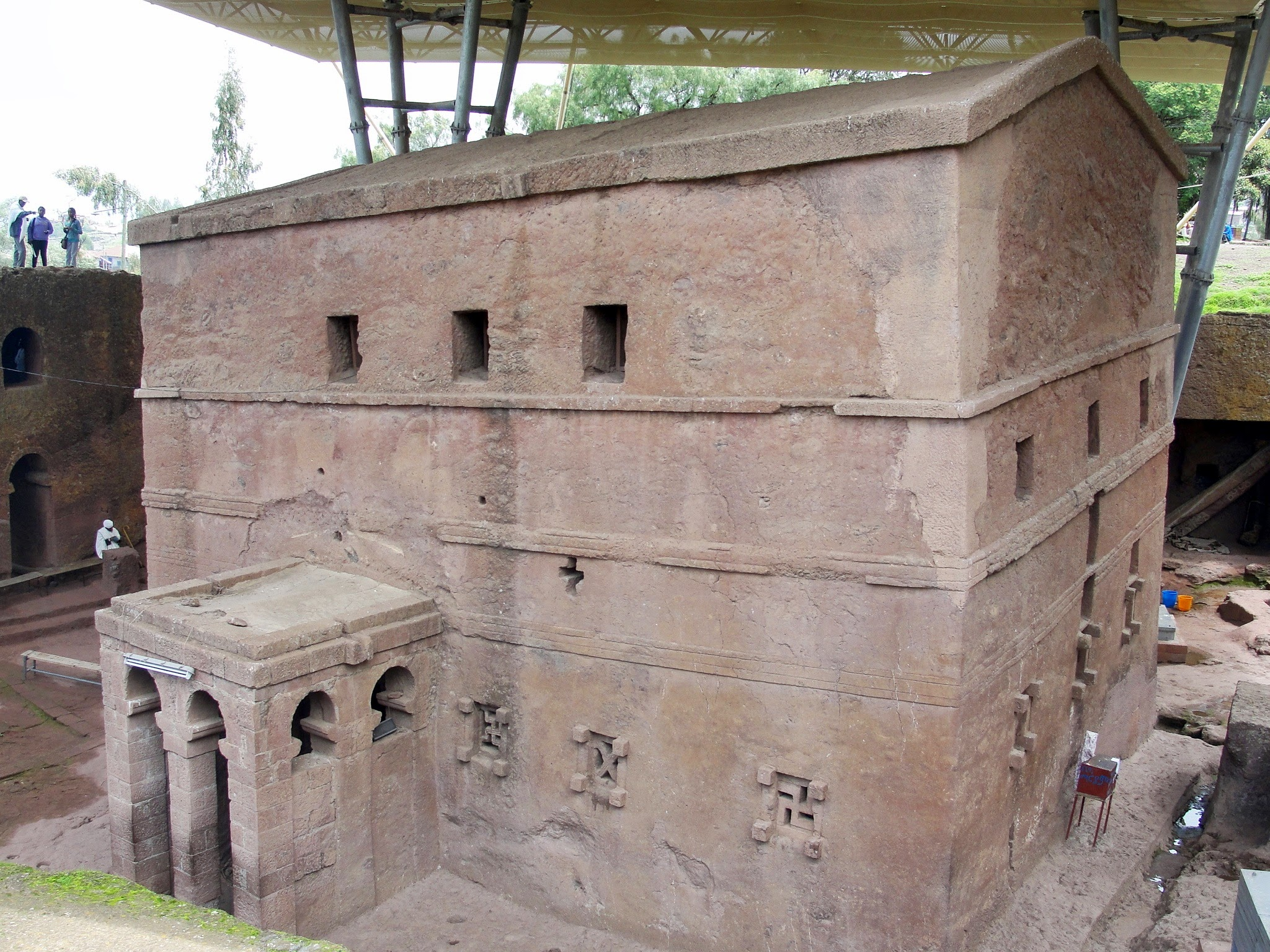
A rock-hewn church of Lalibela

Today's Wollo was long the center of Ethiopia (half under Agew/Zagwe and half under the Solomonic leadership). The people of Amhara and Zagwe Provinces (today's Wollo) were the strongest adherents of Christianity and both believed in Israelite Semitic Biblical Ancestry Zagwe claimed lineage from Moses while the Solomonids claimed lineage from Solomon, and the beliefs and customs of the Church from an essential part of tradition and culture to this area. Evidence of Wollo's political importance to Ethiopia in the medieval era was that the region's rulers played a disproportionate role in the politics of the Ethiopian state. In the medieval era, the Tsahife Lam (ጻሕፈ ላም), governor of the Bete Amhara province, was the most senior military officer next to the Emperor. Along with that, the Jantirar of Ambassel (the center of Bete Amhara and lordship of Yekuno Amlak himself prior to his ascension as Emperor of Ethiopia), was tasked with protecting Amba Geshen. Believers contend that the monastic life is the highest stage of Christian life. Devout Christians hope to live their last years as monks or nuns, and many take monastic vows during old age. The Monastic school of Lake Hayq founded in 1248 by Aba Iyesus-Mo'a was the fundamental school to Saints, scholars and Christians. The Monasteries spread along with the Ethiopian Empire and Tekle-Haymanot (1215–1313) was trained at Hayq by Iyasus Mo'a and started the important Monastic community of Debre Asbo in Shewa Amhara Debre Libanos, Abune Hirute Amlak was also trained in this Monastery by Iyasus Mo'a and started the imperative Monastic community of Daga Estifanos in Lake Tsana and Aba Georgis Zegasecha trained and started the Monastic community of Gasecha.

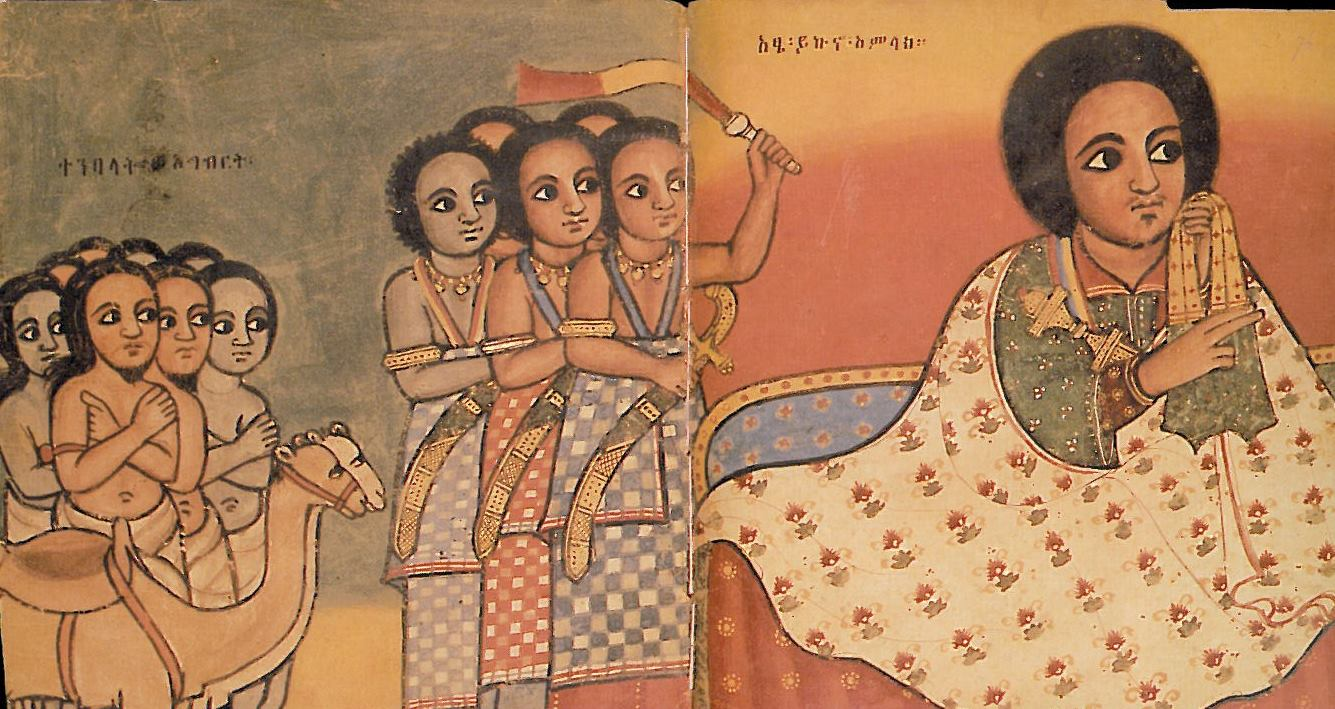
Muslim prisoners before Emperor Yekuno Amlak

As a result of this, several Church works were performed and it was the land of Saints and Christian kings. Therefore, many famous Churches were built by Christian kings and Monasteries were established by great Saints and wonderful Rock Hewn Churches were carved out of rock. Furthermore, it was the center of Church Education. For example, from the Monastery of Hayq Estifanos the well-known Saints and Christian kings had learnt Church education. For this reason, literature, paintings and other heritages flourished throughout the land. In the region many Rock Hewn Churches were built by Saints like, King Abrha and Astbha. Most of them were in the place of Woleka Debresina but they destructed and hidden during the invasion of Ahmad Ibrahim. Aba Betselote Micheal, Aba Giorgis Zegasecha, Aba Tsegie Dengel, Abune Yaekob Zedebrekerbe and by King Lalibela, the rock Church builder - 1140-79 A.D. had a set of ten Rock Hewn Churches built in his capital of Roha, which was later renamed Lalibela. It is also said that he built the Gezaza Abune Gebre Menfes Kidus Church (Gezaza Abbo) in this region around Wegde. All these are rock hewn Churches carved in solid rock, deserve to be taken as few among wonders and are a remarkable monument to the skill and craftsmanship of the Ethiopians.

Mekane Silasse Church was established before 485 years in 1513 E.C. The foundation was started by Atse Naod (1489–1500) and it was finished by his son Atse Lebna Dengel (1500–1513). This Church is different from other Churches because it took 25 years to construct it. Atse Naod worked on it for 13 years but he died before finishing it. So, his son Lebna Dengel finished it after 12 years by constructing a great Church and more beautiful than his father. At the inauguration of the Church in 1513 many famous persons were present. Among them, the Portuguese priest and historian writer, Francisco Alvarez was the one who recorded the ceremonies of the Church inauguration at that time. He admired and writes about the Church's architectural design.

The Church was constructed from Geha stone and it had a Mekdes, Kidist and Kine Mahilet. The four sides of the Mekdes and Kidist were equal in size and shape but the shape of the Kine Mahlet was circular. The Church was also much wider and bigger than other Churches of the time found around Wesel. The Portuguese priest and historian writer, Francisco Alvaraze said the following about its architectural design: “the wall of this Church was made from systematically carved stones and it was designed by a graphic decoration …..the door of the main entrance was covered by gold and silver. Inside the gold and silver there were some precious stones. The roof was laid down on the six columns of the Church and the outer part of the roof was supported by 61 long columns. There were also sixteen curtains made of golden cotton cloth.

On the other hand, the historical writer of Ahmad Ibrahim, Arab Faqih, recorded about its architectural design before the destruction of the Church. He admired its construction and architectural design and said that the following: “there was one church in Bete Amhara which no church could imitate in Habesha land". It was constructed by the father of Lebene Dengel, King Naod. Its work and ornament had taken 13 years but king Naod died before finishing it. His son Lebna Dengel finished it after 25 years. He finished the Church by covering all part of it with gold above what his father had done. So the Church reflects like a fire, because, it was covered by gold and all the church holy treasures liturgical objects) were made from gold and silver. The width of the Church was more than a hundred yards and the height was also more than fifty yards ... Christians called the Church Mekane Silasse..... In this Church, the tomb of Emperor Na'od who is the grand son of Zera Yacob and the son of Be’ede Mariam is found.”

Although the presence of Muslim communities in Wollo is dated to at least the 8th century the province was chiefly inhabit by Christians Amhara. The Jihad of Ahmad Gran and the Oromo expansion latter on brought a significant cultural change in /Wollo. A province which was once a centre of Christianity and Christian culture have become the centre of Islam and Islamic studies.

Queen of Wollo with her son and an Imam in the nineteenth century by Henry Stern

The Oromo clans that invaded Wollo in the late 16th century adopted Islam during their expansion process. And when they arrived in the province they committed various atrocities against its local Christian Amhara population; they burnt churches in every district which they invade, killed the clergy and sold Christians into slavery. Emperor Tekle Giyorgis I decided to punish the Oromo over the atrocities that they committed against the Christian population of Bete Amhara but failed to completely operate it due to internal problems that he faced. The Amhara were pushed into the western districts of Sayint, Delanta and Wadla. Whereas part of them remain isolated and clustered in highland areas of wollo; especially in Warra Himano and Ambassel. Christianity virtually disappeared in much of what was the medieval province of Amhara.

After occupying and settling in the province, the Oromos changed the original names of many districts in Bete Amhara and named them after their clans and sub-clans, such as: Borona, Qallu, Bati, Wuchale, Worra Himano, Lagga Ghora, Tehuladere, Laggambo, and Lagga-Hidda. According to J. Spencer Trimingham it become regular among foreign travellers to call all the Muslim population of the region “Wollo Galla” but many of the Wollo do not belong to the Oromo ethnic group at all. That is especially the case with the population in the highland regions of Wollo; such as the massifs of Legambo and Legahida and the Were Ilu Plateau. These from ethnical point of view are Abyssinians whom their only common link with Oromo is the Islam religion.

With the adoption of the 1995 constitution & the establishment of ethnic federalism system in Ethiopia, parts of the expanded Wollo province, which were mostly inhabited by Afar people were given to the new Afar Region. The new Amhara Region absorbed the remainder of the province in the Ethiopian Highlands and kept the name Wollo for its two new zones (South Wollo Zone & North Wollo Zone). Wollo is known to be the origin of the four melodic-modes (kignits) of Ethiopia.

== See also ==
- History of Ethiopia
