= Albuko (woreda) =

Albuko አልብኮ
- Woreda
- Flag
- Zone: South Wollo
- Region: Amhara Region

Area
  - Total: 476.68 km^{2} (184.05 sq mi)

Population (2012 est.)
  - Total: 83,621
  - Density: 175.42/km^{2} (454.35/sq mi)

Albuko (Amharic: አልብኮ) is one of the woredas in the Amhara Region of Ethiopia. Part of the Debub Wollo Zone, Abuko is bordered on the south by Semien Shewa Zone, on the west by Were Ilu, on the north by Dessie Zuria, on the northeast by Kalu, and on the east by Oromia Zone.

== Demographics ==
A 2012 estimate puts the population at 83,621. This gives a population density of 175.42 people per square kilometer (454.35 people per square mile), given its area of 476.68 square kilometers (184.05 square miles), higher than the South Wollo Zone average of 161.49 people per square kilometer (418.56 people per square mile).

Based on the 2007 national census conducted by the Central Statistical Agency of Ethiopia (CSA), this woreda has a total population of 77,167, of whom 38,462 are men and 38,705 women; 3,465 or 4.49% are urban inhabitants. The majority of the inhabitants were Muslim, with 94.22% reporting that as their religion, while 5.69% of the population said they practiced Ethiopian Orthodox Christianity.
