= Dessie Zuria =

Coordinates: 11°10′N 39°20′E

Dessie Zuria ደሴ ዙሪያ
- Woreda
- Flag
- Interactive map of Dessie Zuria
- Country: Ethiopia
- Region: Amhara
- Zone: South Wollo

Area
  - Total: 937.32 km^{2} (361.90 sq mi)

Population (2012 est.)
  - Total: 169,791
  - Density: 181.15/km^{2} (469.16/sq mi)

Dessie Zuria (Amharic ደሴ ዙሪያ "Greater Dessie Area") is one of the woredas in the Amhara Region of Ethiopia. Located at the eastern edge of the Ethiopian Highlands in the Debub Wollo Zone, Dessie Zuria is bordered on the south by Abuko and Were Ilu, on the southwest by Legambo, on the northwest by Tenta, on the north by Kutaber, on the northeast by Tehuledere, and on the east by Kalu. The cities of Kombolcha and Dessie are independent woredas surrounded by Dessie Zuria; the major town in the woreda is Tita.

In 2002, a number of kebeles were taken from Kalu and Dessie Zuria to create the new woreda of Abuko.

== Demographics ==
A 2012 estimate puts the population at 169,791. This gives a population density of 181.15 people per square kilometer (469.16 people per square mile), given its area of 937.32 square kilometers (361.90 square miles), higher than the South Wollo Zone average of 161.49 people per square kilometer (418.56 people per square mile).

Based on the 2007 national census conducted by the Central Statistical Agency of Ethiopia (CSA), this woreda has a total population of 157,679, an increase of -21.72% over the 1994 census, of whom 77,626 are men and 80,053 women; - or 0.00% are urban inhabitants. With an area of 937.32 square kilometers, Dessie Zuriya has a population density of 168.22, which is greater than the Zone average of 147.58 persons per square kilometer. A total of 35,437 households were counted in this woreda, resulting in an average of 4.45 persons to a household, and 34,524 housing units.The 1994 national census reported a total population for this woreda of 201,433 in 43,294 households, of whom 99,158 were men and 102,275 were women; 2,224 or 1.1% of its population were urban dwellers.

In 1994 the largest ethnic group reported in Dessie Zuria was the Amhara (99.93%). Amharic was spoken as a first language by 99.58%. The majority of the inhabitants were Muslim, with 97.72% of the population having reported they practiced that belief, while 2.21% of the population said they professed Ethiopian Orthodox Christianity. By 2007 this had shifted slightly with 98.51% reporting Islam as their religion, while 1.39% of the population said they practiced Ethiopian Orthodox Christianity.

== See also ==
- Sagarat
