= Yekuno Amlak =

Emperor of Ethiopia from 1270 to 1285

Yekuno Amlak; ዐፄ ይኩኖ አምላክ
- King of Kings
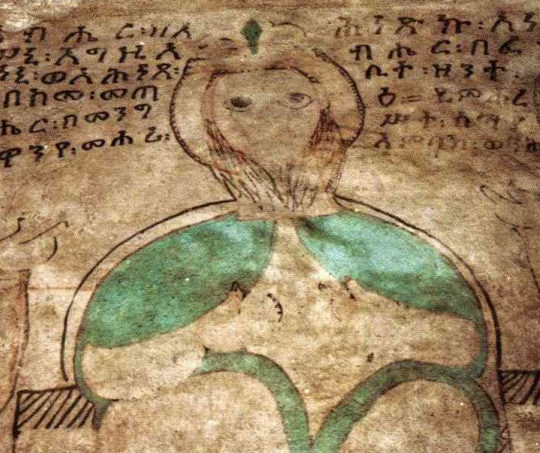
- A painting of Yekuno Amlak from the Geneta Mariam Church in Lalibela, late 13th century

Emperor of Ethiopia
- Reign: 10 August 1270 – 19 June 1285
- Successor: Yagbe'u Seyon
- Born: 1250s Bete Amhara
- Died: 19 June 1285; Ethiopian Empire
- Burial: Atronsa Maryam
Regnal name
- Tasfa Iyasus
- Dynasty: House of Solomon
- Father: Tesfa Yesus
- Mother: Emine Sion
- Religion: Ethiopian Orthodox Church

Yekuno Amlak (Ge'ez: ይኩኖ አምላክ, romanized: Yəkkuno ˀAmlak); throne name Tesfa Iyasus (ተስፋ ኢየሱስ; died 19 June 1285) was the first Emperor of the Ethiopian Empire from 1270 to 1285, and the founder of the Solomonic dynasty, which remained in power until 1974. He was a ruler from Bete Amhara (in parts of modern-day Wollo and northern Shewa) who became the Emperor of Ethiopia following the defeat of the last Zagwe king.

== Origins and rise to power ==
Yekuno Amlak hailed from an ancient Amhara family. Later medieval texts, written in support of his dynasty, claimed that he was a direct male line descendant of the former royal house of the Kingdom of Aksum which was, itself, descended, it was claimed, from the biblical king Solomon. The claims formed the basis of his dynasty's pretense that Yekuno Amlak "restored" the Solomonic dynasty to the Ethiopian throne when he overthrew the last of the Zagwe kings in 1270. The Zagwe dynasty, which had replaced the Aksumite royal house several centuries earlier, were depicted as "non-Israelite" usurpers. Yekuno Amlak's descendants, the Ethiopian emperors of the Solomonic dynasty, continued to propagate the dynasty's claimed descent from Solomon such that it was enshrined in the 1955 Ethiopian constitution.

Yekuno Amlak was the local ruler of Geshen and Ambassel around the Lake Hayq region. where he was educated at Lake Hayq's Istifanos Monastery. Later medieval hagiographies state Tekle Haymanot raised and educated him, helping him depose the last king of the Zagwe dynasty. Earlier hagiographies, however, state that it was Iyasus Mo'a, the abbot of Istifanos Monastery near Ambasel, who helped him achieve power. British Colonial Office scholar G.W.B. Huntingford explains this discrepancy by pointing out Istifanos had once been the premier monastery of Ethiopia, but Tekle Haymanot's Debre Libanos eventually eclipsed Istifanos, and from the reign of Amda Seyon it became the custom to appoint the abbot of Debre Libanos Ichege, or secular head of the Ethiopian Church. However, neither of these traditions is contemporary with any of the individuals involved.

There was also the story, related in both the "Life of Iyasus Mo'a" and the Be'ela nagastat, that a rooster was heard to prophesize outside of the house of the Yakuno Amlak for three months that whoever ate his head would be king. The king then had the bird killed and cooked, but the cook discarded the rooster's head—which Yekuno Amlak ate, and thus became ruler of Ethiopia. Scholars have pointed out the similarity between this legend and one about the first king of Kaffa, who likewise learned from mysterious voice that eating the head of a certain rooster would make him king, as well as the Ethiopian Mashafa dorho or "Book of the Cock", which relates a story about a cooked rooster presented to Christ at the Last Supper which is brought back to life.

Traditional history further reports that Yekuno Amlak was imprisoned by the Zagwe King Za-Ilmaknun ("the unknown, the hidden one") on Mount Malot, but managed to escape. He gathered support in the Amhara provinces and in Shewa, after receiving considerable aid from the Muslim Sultanate of Shewa with an army of followers, defeated the Zagwe king at the Battle of Ansata. Taddesse Tamrat argued that this king was Yetbarak, but due to a local form of damnatio memoriae, his name was removed from the official records. A more recent chronicler of Wollo history, Getatchew Mekonnen Hasen, states that the last Zagwe king deposed by Yekuno Amlak was Na'akueto La'ab.

== Reign ==
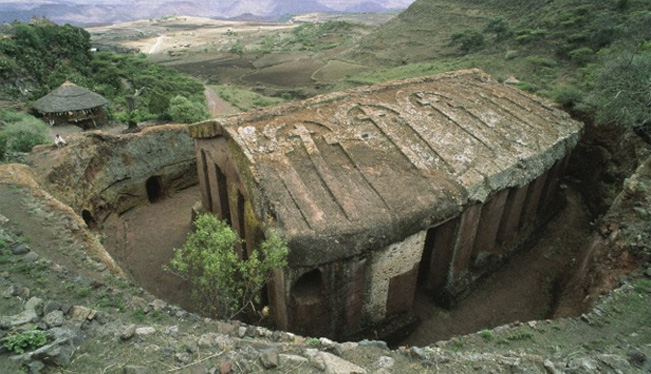
The church of Genneta Maryam, which is traditionally believed to have been built by Yekuno Amlak

Yekuno Amlak took the name of his father as his throne name upon becoming emperor of Ethiopia, and is said to have campaigned against the Kingdom of Damot, which lay south of the Abbay River. According to Arabic texts found in Harar, a deposed Dil Marrah of the Sultanate of Shewa successfully appealed to Yekuno Amlak in 1279 to restore his rule. Another source relates that his state's expansion began in 1285 with his conquest of the Shewan Sultanate. Due to Yekuno Amlak's friendly relations with the Emirs of Harar, he founded Ankober, an alternative capital near their principality.

Recorded history affords more certainty as to his relations with other countries. For example, E.A. Wallis Budge states that Yekuno Amlak not only exchanged letters with the Byzantine Emperor Michael VIII, but sent to him several giraffes as a gift. At first, his interactions with his Muslim neighbors were friendly; however his attempts to be granted an Abuna for the Ethiopian Orthodox Church strained these relations. A letter survives that he wrote to the Egyptian Mamluk Sultan Baibars, who was suzerain over the Patriarch of Alexandria (the ultimate head of the Ethiopian church), for his help for a new Abuna in 1273; the letter suggests this was not his first request. When one did not arrive, he blamed the intervention of the Sultan of Yemen, who had hindered the progress of his messenger to Cairo.

Taddesse Tamrat interprets Yekuno Amlak's son's allusion to Syrian priests at the royal court as a result of this lack of attention from the Patriarch. Taddesse also notes that around this time, the Patriarchs of Alexandria and Antioch were struggling for control of the appointment of the bishop of Jerusalem, until then the prerogative of the Patriarch of Antioch. One of the moves in this dispute was Patriarch Ignatius IV Yeshu's appointment of an Ethiopian pilgrim as Abuna. This pilgrim never attempted to assume this post in Ethiopia, but—Taddesse Tamrat argues—the lack of Coptic bishops forced Yekuno Amlak to rely on the Syrian partisans who arrived in his kingdom.

Yekuno Amlak is credited with the construction of the Church of Gennete Maryam near Lalibela, which contains the earliest surviving dateable wall paintings in Ethiopia.

His descendant Emperor Baeda Maryam I had Yekuno Amlak's body re-interred in the church of Atronsa Maryam.

== Bibliography ==
- Sellassie, Sergew Hable (1972). Ancient and Medieval Ethiopian History to 1270. Addis Ababa.

Regnal titles
Preceded by Yetbarak	Emperor of Ethiopia; 1270–1285	Succeeded by Yagbe'u Seyon
