= Hayq, Ethiopia =

Hayq ሐይቅ
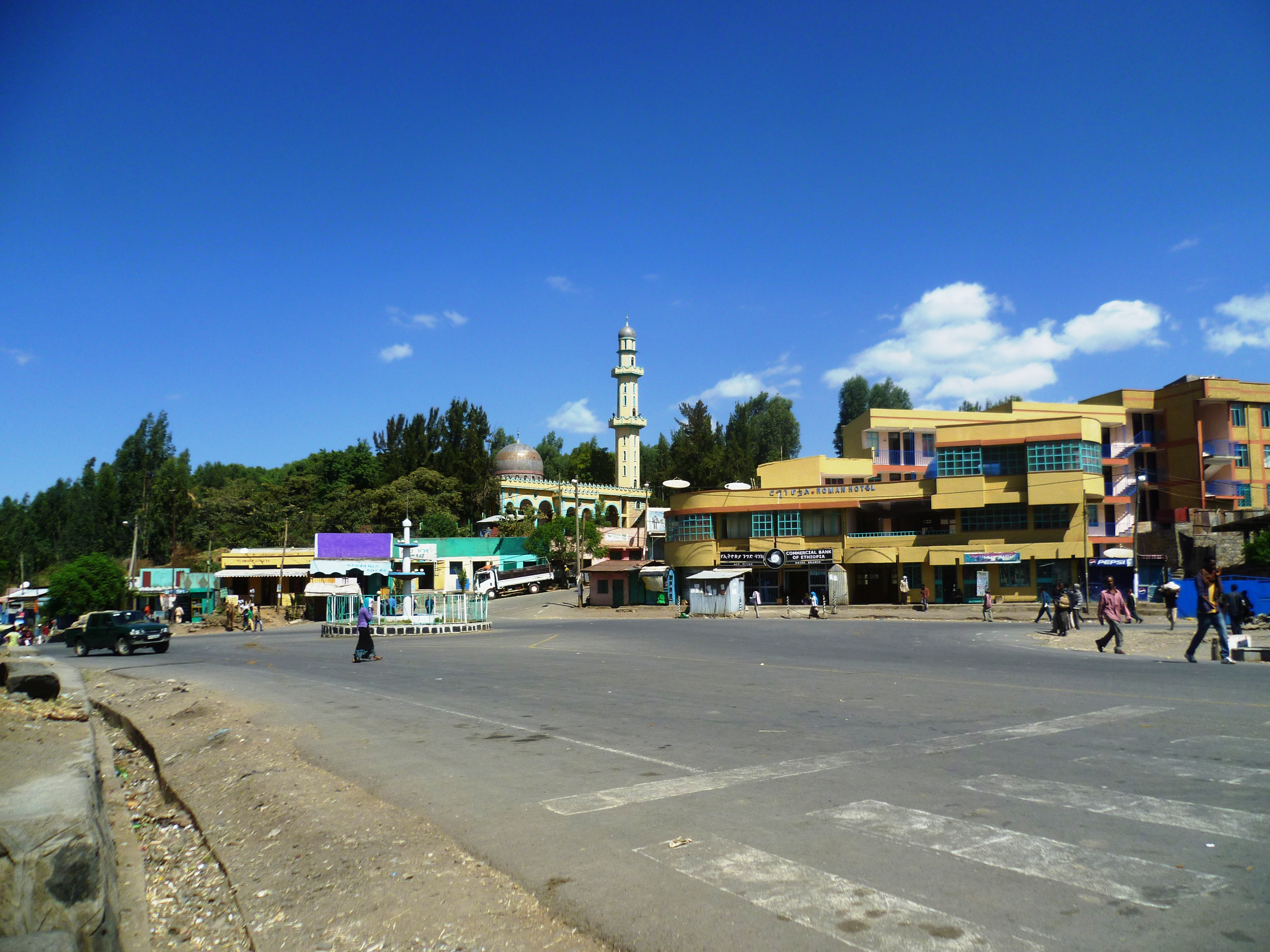
- Hayq, Ethiopia

- Location in Ethiopia
- Coordinates: 11°18′45″N 39°40′45″E
- Country: Ethiopia
- Region: Amhara
- Zone: Debub Wollo
- Elevation: 2,030 m (6,660 ft)

Population (2005)
  - Total: 14,319 (est)
- Time zone: UTC+3 (EAT)
- Area code: None

Hayq or Haik (Amharic: ሐይቅ) is a town in northern Ethiopia. It is named after Lake Hayq, which lies two kilometers east of the city and is the home of Istifanos Monastery, an important landmark in Ethiopian Church history. Located 28 kilometers north of Dessie in the Tehuledere woreda of the Debub Wollo Zone of the Amhara Region, the town has a latitude and longitude of 11°18′N 39°41′E and an elevation of 2,030 metres (6,660 ft) above sea level.

Telephone service reached the town of Hayq at some point between 1954 and 1967. Notable landmarks include the churches Hayq Timhirt and Hayq Yohannis. Near the town is the church of Hayq Tekle Haymanot, founded according to tradition in 862 by Saint Kalae Salama during the reign of king Dil Na'od.

== History ==
In the late 1930s, the Italian occupiers dedicated a graveyard near Hayq for the bodies of dead soldiers from the Blackshirt 3 Gennaio Division. During the mid-1980s, local educational services was augmented by the Swedish Wello Environment Education Project, which ran a secondary school. Hayq was formerly the capital of the Amba Sel woreda or district in Wollo.

Construction of a youth center, which includes amenities as a gymnasium, internet service room, assembly hall, a café, and office space, was underway in March 2009. Funds for construction of the building, budgeted at a million Birr, was provided by the woreda and Helvidius, a non-governmental organization.

== Demographics ==
Based on figures from the Central Statistical Agency in 2005, Hayq has an estimated total population of 14,319 of whom 7,226 are men and 7,093 are women. The 1994 census reported this town had a total population of 8,247 of whom 3,802 were males and 4,445 were females. It is the largest town in Tehuledere woreda.
