= Kutaber (woreda) =

Coordinates: 11°20′N 39°15′E

- Woreda
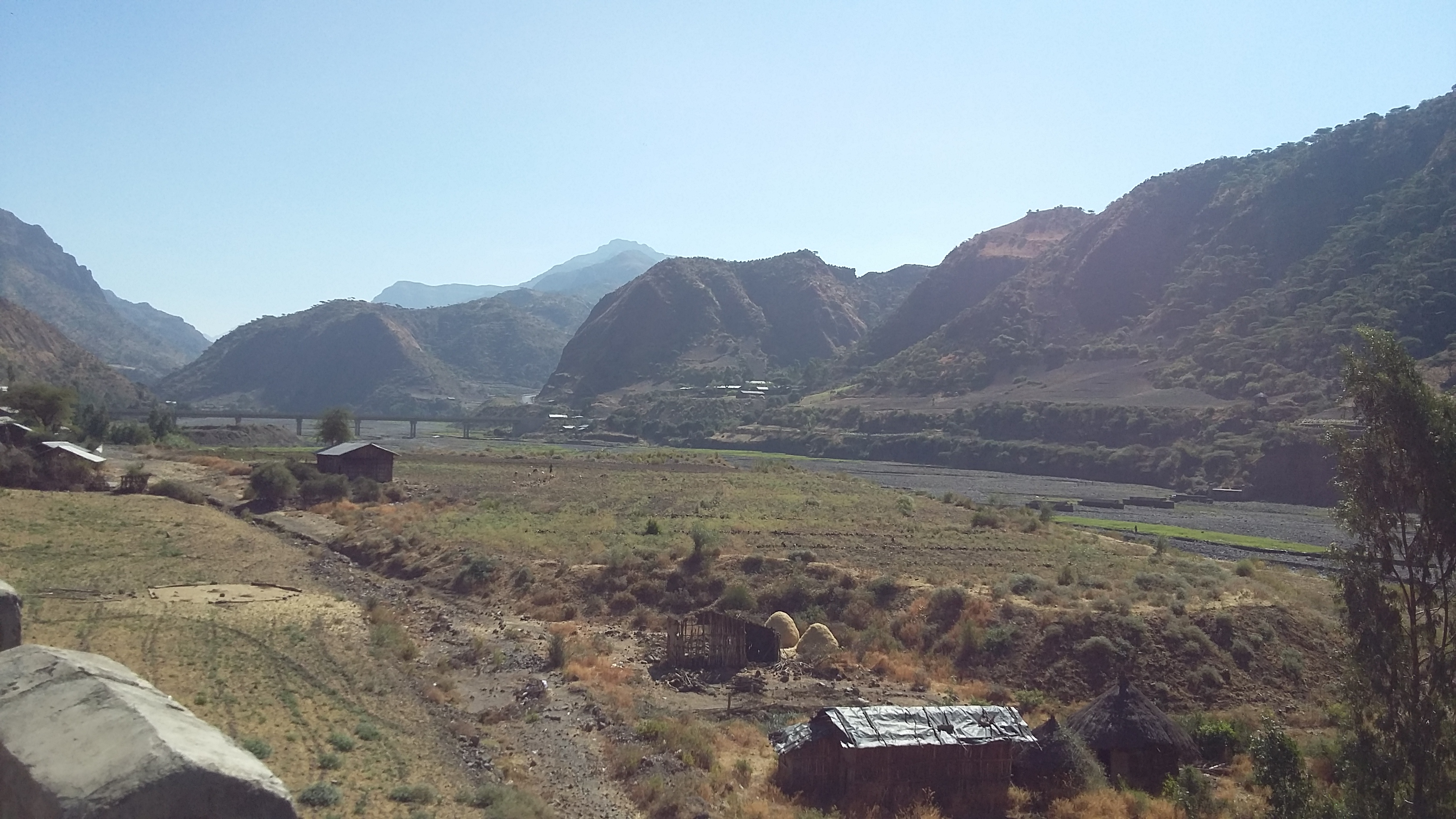

- Flag
- Interactive map of Kutaber
- Country: Ethiopia
- Region: Amhara
- Zone: South Wollo

Area
  - Total: 719.92 km^{2} (277.96 sq mi)

Population (2012 est.)
  - Total: 103,489
  - Density: 143.75/km^{2} (372.31/sq mi)

Kutaber (Amharic: ኩታበር) is one of the woredas in the Amhara Region of Ethiopia. Part of the Debub Wollo Zone, Kutaber is bordered on the south by Dessie Zuria, on the west by the Adila River which separates it from Tenta, on the north by the Walano which separates it from Ambassel, and on the east by Tehuledere; both the Adila and the Walano, as well as all rivers in this woreda are tributaries of the Bashilo River. The major town in Kutaber is Kutaber.

Elevations in this woreda range from 800 meters at the northernmost point where the Walano joins the Bashilo, to 3200 meters in the hills around Kutaber and the ridge dividing the Entade and Guba Lafto Rivers.

== Demographics ==
A 2012 estimate puts the population at 103,489. This gives a population density of 143.75 people per square kilometer (372.31 people per square mile), given its area of 719.92 square kilometers (277.69 square miles), lower than the South Wollo Zone average of 161.49 people per square kilometer (418.56 people per square mile).

Based on the 2007 national census conducted by the Central Statistical Agency of Ethiopia (CSA), this woreda has a total population of 95,410, a decrease of 24.76% from the 1994 census, of whom 47,341 are men and 48,069 women; 4,940 or 5.18% are urban inhabitants. With an area of 719.92 square kilometers, Kutaber has a population density of 132.53, which is less than the Zone average of 147.58 persons per square kilometer. A total of 22,304 households were counted in this woreda, resulting in an average of 4.28 persons to a household, and 21,601 housing units. The majority of the inhabitants are Muslim, with 87.83% reporting that as their religion, while 12.01% of the population said they practiced Ethiopian Orthodox Christianity.

The 1994 national census reported a total population for this woreda of 126,805 in 27,884 households, of whom 62,556 were men and 64,249 were women; 2,849 or 2.25% of its population were urban dwellers. The largest ethnic group reported in Kutaber was the Amhara (99.86%). Amharic was spoken as a first language by 99.9%. The majority of the inhabitants were Muslim, with 88.65% of the population reported as practicing that belief, while 10.78% of the population said they professed Ethiopian Orthodox Christianity.
