= St. Takla Haymanot's Church (Alexandria) =

Saint Takla Haymanot
- Saint Takla Haymanot's Coptic Orthodox Church
- Map of Egypt
- 31°12′38″N 29°55′35″E
- Location: Ibrahemeya, Alexandria
- Country: Egypt
- Denomination: Coptic Orthodox Church of Alexandria

History
- Dedication: Saint Takla Haymanot
- Consecrated: 19 June 1969

Architecture
- Architectural type: church
- Style: Coptic
- Years built: 19 June 1969

Clergy
- Bishop: Pope Tawadros

St. Takla Haymanot's Church is a Coptic Orthodox church in the city of Alexandria, Egypt, located in the district of Ibrahimia near Alexandria Sporting Club. Consecrated on 19 June 1969, it is dedicated to the 13th century Ethiopian Orthodox monk Saint Tekle Haymanot.

It was visited by Ethiopian patriarch Abune Paulos on 15 July 2007 as part of his landmark trip to Egypt aimed at repairing ties between the Ethiopian Orthodox Tewahedo Church and the Coptic Orthodox Church of Alexandria. All the pictures and icons in St. Takla Haymanot's Church are the work of famed Egyptian iconographer Isaac Fanous.

The church used to maintain one of the best Coptic-related websites on the Internet, which later was separated from the church as a standalone Coptic website due to its large general religious nature, and currently has no connection with the church.
