= Kalu (woreda) =

Coordinates: 11°00′N 39°50′E

Kalu ቃሉ
- Woreda
- Flag
- Interactive map of Kalu
- Country: Ethiopia
- Region: Amhara
- Zone: Debub Wollo

Area
  - Total: 851.54 km^{2} (328.78 sq mi)

Population (2012 est.)
  - Total: 203,494
  - Density: 130.75/km^{2} (338.65/sq mi)

Kalu (Amharic: ቃሉ), also known as Harbu, is one of the woredas in the Amhara Region of Ethiopia. Part of the Debub Wollo Zone, Kalu is bordered on the west by Dessie Zuria, on the north by Were Babu, on the south and east by the Oromia Zone, on the southeast by Argobba special woreda, and on the southwest by Abuko. The administrative center for this woreda is Harbu; other towns in Kalu include Ancharo, Gerba, and Degan. A highway linking Kombolcha and Afar bisects Kalu to two parts.

== Overview ==
The altitude of this woreda ranges from 800 metres above sea level in the lowlands bordering the Oromia Zone to 1,750 metres at the foot of the mountains north of Kombolcha; the climate of Kalu varies from dry sub-humid to semi-arid. Important rivers include the Cheleleka and Borkana. Forested area includes Yegof forest, 180 square kilometres of native trees and plantations of exotic species covering the steep slopes of Mount Yegof northeast of Kombolcha, which regenerated after the 1973-1974 famine.

In 2002, a number of kebeles were taken from Kalu and Dessie Zuria to create the new woreda of Abuko. Argobba special woreda was separated from Kalu. Pottery shards were recovered from tombs near Atatiya in Harbu, pointing to the presence of the Kingdom of Axum as far south as the area this woreda now covers.

== Demographics ==
A 2012 estimate puts the population at 203,494. This gives a population density of 130.75 people per square kilometer (338.65 people per square mile), given its area of 851.54 square kilometers (328.78 square miles), lower than the South Wollo Zone average of 161.49 people per square kilometer (418.56 people per square mile).

Based on the 2007 national census conducted by the Central Statistical Agency of Ethiopia (CSA), this woreda has a total population of 186,181, an increase of 9.18% over the 1994 census, of whom 94,187 are men and 91,994 women; 19,810 or 10.64% are urban inhabitants. With an area of 851.54 square kilometers, Kalu has a population density of 218.64, which is greater than the Zone average of 147.58 persons per square kilometre. A total of 41,648 households were counted in this woreda, resulting in an average of 4.47 persons to a household, and 40,115 housing units.The 1994 national census reported a total population for this woreda of 170,523 in 34,681 households, of whom 85,326 were men and 85,197 were women; 9,897 or 5.8% of its population were urban dwellers.

In 1994 the largest ethnic group reported in Kalu was the Amhara (99.24%). Amharic was spoken as a first language by 99.27%. The majority of the inhabitants were Muslim, with 96.76% of the population having reported they practiced that belief, while 3.14% of the population said they professed Ethiopian Orthodox Christianity. By 2007 this had shifted somewhat, with 98.73% reporting Islam as their religion, while 1.17% of the population said they practised Ethiopian Orthodox Christianity.
