= Ancharo =

Town in Ethiopia

Ancharo (Amharic: አንቻሮ), also known as Curcureta, is a town in northern Ethiopia. Located in the Debub Wollo Zone of the Amhara Region, Ancharo has a latitude and longitude of 11°03′N 39°47′E with an elevation of 2972 meters above sea level. It is one of four towns in Kalu woreda.

The missionary Johann Ludwig Krapf, who visited Ancharo in the 1840s, described the town as one of the principal marketplaces of the Were Wallo, a "House" or a sub-group of the Wollo Oromo.

== Demographics ==
Based on figures from the Central Statistical Agency in 2011, Ancharo had an estimated total population of 843 of whom 452 are men and 391 are women. The 1994 census reported this town had a total population of 1,015 of whom 486 were men and 529 were women.
