= Wuchale =

Town in Amhara Region, Ethiopia

Wuchale 17 ውጫሌ
- Town
- Location within Ethiopia
- Coordinates: 11°30′N 39°36′E
- Country: Ethiopia
- Region: Amhara
- Zone: Debub Wollo
- Elevation: 1,711 m (5,614 ft)

Population (2005)
  - Total: 6,811
- Time zone: UTC+3 (EAT)

Wuchale (Amharic: ውጫሌ), also spelled Uccialli, is a town in northern Ethiopia. Located about 40 km north of Dessie in the Debub Wollo Zone of the Amhara Region, this town has a latitude and longitude of 11°30′N 39°36′E and an elevation of 1711 m. It is the largest settlement in Ambassel woreda and is located along Ethiopian Highway 2.

== History ==
In 1889, when it was a fief of Queen Taytu, Italian ambassador Count Pietro Antonelli met with Emperor Menelik II at Wuchale shortly after the death in battle of Emperor Yohannes IV. The two countries came to an agreement known as the Treaty of Wuchale, which was written in two languages, Amharic and Italian, and signed on 2 May. Per the treaty, emperor Menelik recognized Italy's occupation of Eritrea and agreed (at least in the Italian version) Italian trusteeship over the Abyssinian empire under Menelik. The Ethiopian emperor contested this interpretation of the treaty and therefore denounced the treaty in 1893. Italy attempted to forcibly impose the protectorate over Ethiopia, leading to the First Italo-Ethiopian War, which ended in Italy's defeat at the Battle of Adwa and the subsequent Treaty of Addis Ababa.

Writing a few years later, Augustus B. Wylde described the Wuchale market, held on Mondays, as a small one.

== Demographics ==
Based on figures from the Central Statistical Agency in 2005, Wuchale has an estimated total population of 6,811 of whom 3,326 are men and 3,485 are women. The 1994 census reported this town had a total population of 3,934 of whom 1,750 were men and 2,184 were women.
