= Iyasus Mo'a =

Ethiopian saint in the 13th century

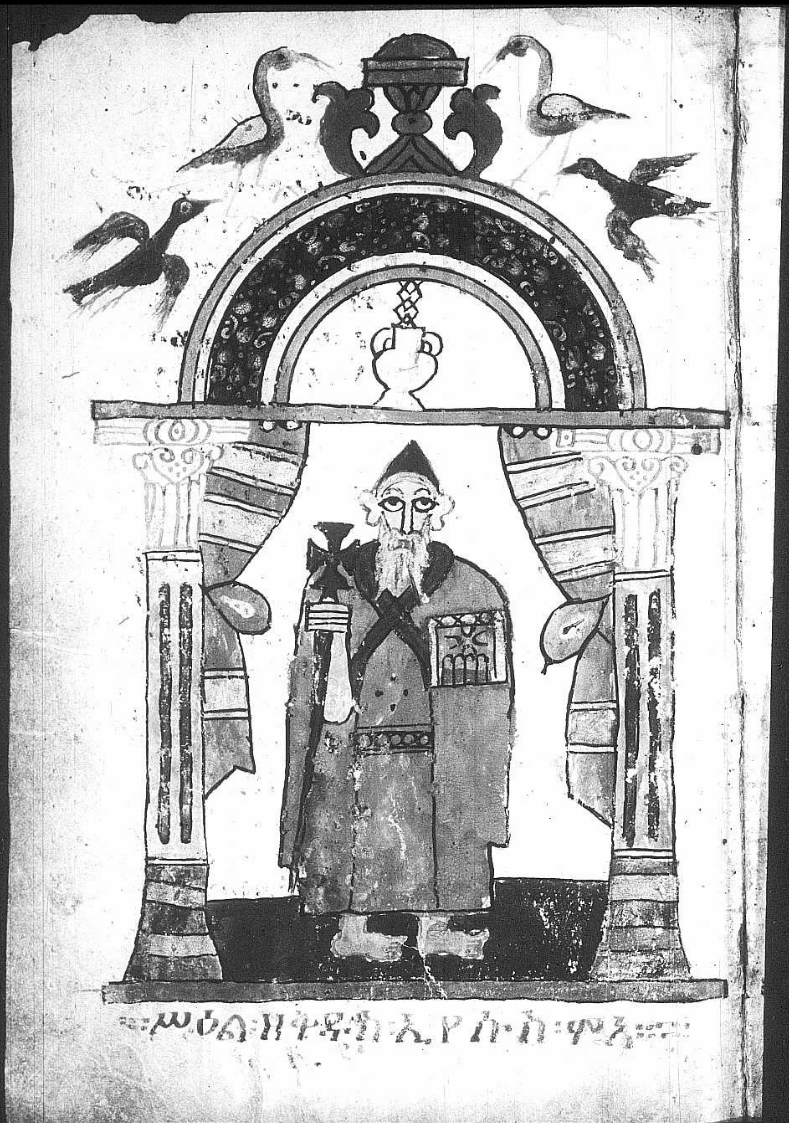
- Native depiction of Iyasus Mo'a
- Born: 1214; Dehana (between Zagwe dynasty and Alodia)
- Died: 1294 (aged 79–80)
- Venerated in: Ethiopian Orthodox Tewahedo Church; Eritrean Orthodox Tewahedo Church
- Major shrine: Istifanos Monastery, Lake Hayq, Amhara Region, Ethiopia
- Feast: 5 December

Iyasus Mo'a (1214 – 1294) was an Ethiopian saint of the Ethiopian Orthodox Tewahedo Church; his feast day is 5 December (26 Hedar in the Ethiopian calendar). In life he was an Ethiopian monk and Abbot of Istifanos Monastery in Lake Hayq of Amba Sel.

== Life ==
Iyasus was born in Dehana, which may have been the woreda in the Wag Hemra Zone, although G.W.B. Huntingford identifies it with Dahna, a village 15 miles east of the Tekeze River. At the age of 30, Iyasus Mo'a travelled to the monastery of Debre Damo during the abbacy of Abba Yohannis where he was made a monk, and was given arduous tasks by the abbot. After seven years, he left Debra Damo and came to live with an eremetic community around the eighth-century church of Istanafanos at Lake Hayq, and organized this group into a monastery with rules and a school. One of the students of this school was Saint Tekle Haymanot, who stayed at the monastery for 10 years. The Zagwe king Na'akueto La'ab later made him abbot of this monastery in c. 1248.

His biography, the Gadla Iyasus Mo'a ("Acts of Iyasus Mo'a"), records that Yekuno Amlak had fled from the authorities in Amba Sel and hid in the church because of a prophecy (tinbit) that he would become a king. His mother, upon hearing such prediction, brought him to Istifanos Monastery in Lake Hayq and begged the priests there to hide her son and save him from being killed. Iyasus Mo'a protected and educated the boy, and in return, Emperor Yekuno Amlak built the structure to house his community. Later hagiographies state that Yekuno Amlak was helped by Tekle Haymanot, but the critical researches of Carlo Conti Rossini suggest that the Gadla Iyasus Mo'a is closer to the correct version of events.
