= Ambassel =

District in Amhara Region, Ethiopia

Coordinates: 11°45′N 39°15′E

Ambassel አምባሰል
- Woreda
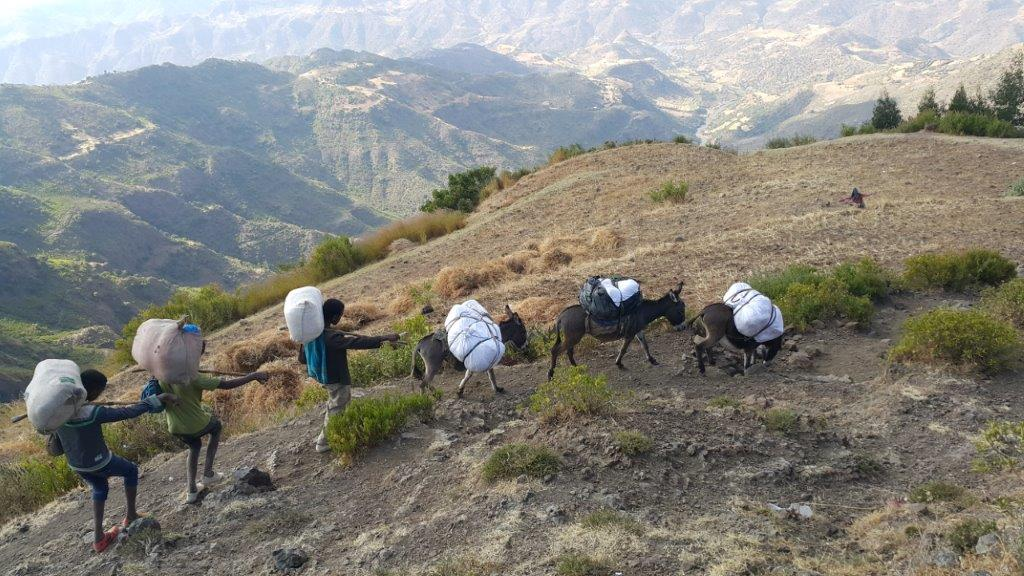
- Interactive map of Ambassel
- Country: Ethiopia
- Region: Amhara
- Zone: Debub Wollo

Area
  - Total: 882.24 km^{2} (340.63 sq mi)

Population (2012 est.)
  - Total: 132,157
  - Density: 149.80/km^{2} (387.98/sq mi)

Ambassel (Amharic: አምባሰል) is a woreda in Amhara Region, Ethiopia, and an amba, or mountain fortress, located in the woreda. The word Ambasel is derived from two words "Amba" from the Amharic word for plateau, and “Asel” from the Arabic language, which means honey. Together, it means “plateau of honey” or the “land of honey” the woreda is named for this feature. Located in the Debub Wollo Zone, Ambassel woreda is bordered on the west by the Bashilo which separates it from Tenta, on the north by the Semien Wollo Zone, on the southeast by the Mille River which separates it from Tehuledere, and on the south by Kutaber; the Walano, a tributary of the Bashilo, defines most of its southern border. Its largest town is Wuchale.

Elevations in this woreda range from 1200 to 3200 meters above sea level; the divide between the drainage areas of the Nile and the Awash runs through the middle of Ambassel. Rivers include the Waha Titu. Notable landmarks include Amba Geshen, where the medieval Emperors of Ethiopia would confine their male relatives to keep them from threatening his power. Ambassel has proven deposits of coal near Wuchale, which were exploited during the Italian occupation.

== History ==
The jantirar has been the hereditary position of the ruler of the district of Ambassel since the reign of the first Ethiopian emperor Yekuno Amlak, but in the past ruled within the greater domain of Bete Amhara (Wollo). They historically governed the mountain fortress Amba Geshen. Empress Menen Asfaw, consort of Emperor Haile Selassie, was a daughter of Jantirar Asfaw of Ambassel.

== Demographics ==
A 2012 estimate puts the population at 132,157. This gives a population density of 149.80 people per square kilometer (387.98 people per square mile), given its area of 882.24 square kilometers (340.63 square miles), lower than the South Wollo Zone average of 161.49 people per square kilometer (418.56 people per square mile).

Based on the 2007 national census conducted by the Central Statistical Agency of Ethiopia (CSA), this woreda has a total population of 121,899, an increase of 9.65% over the 1994 census, of whom 61,290 are men and 60,609 women; 5,882 or 4.83% are urban inhabitants. With an area of 882.24 square kilometers, Amba Sel has a population density of 138.17, which is less than the Zone average of 147.58 persons per square kilometer. A total of 29,390 households were counted in this woreda, resulting in an average of 4.15 persons to a household, and 28,407 housing units.The 1994 national census reported a total population for this woreda of 111,172 in 24,610 households, of whom 55,074 were men and 56,098 was women; 3,934 or 3.54% of its population were urban dwellers.

In 1994 the largest ethnic group reported in Ambassel was the Amhara (99.91%). Amharic was spoken as a first language by 99.92%. The majority of the inhabitants professed Ethiopian Orthodox Christianity, with 73.92% having reported they practiced that belief, while 25.85% of the population said they were Muslim. This was largely the same in 2007, with 73.47% reporting that as their religion, while 26.19% of the population were Muslim.

== See also ==
- Battle of Amba Sel
