= Tekle Haymanot =

Ethiopian monk and hermit (1215–1313)

Abune Tekle Haymanot
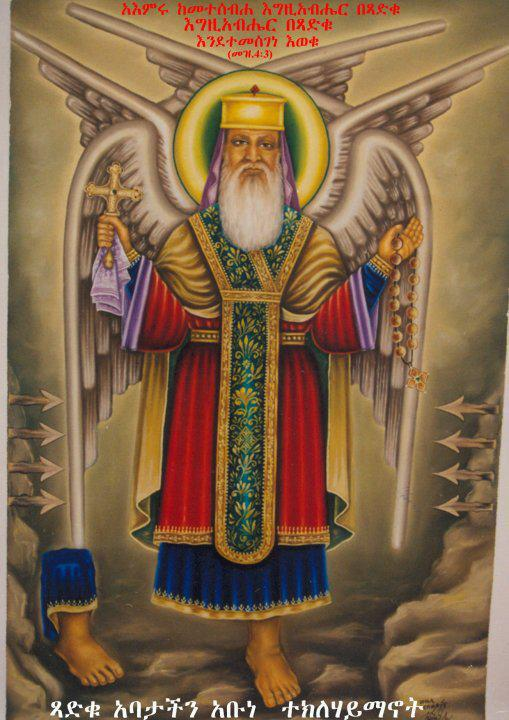
- Painting of Abune Tekle Haymanot in a publication

The Righteous
- Born: 1215; Bulga, Shewa
- Died: 1313 (aged 97–98); Debre Libanos, Ethiopian Empire
- Venerated in: Coptic Orthodox Church; Ethiopian Orthodox Church; Eritrean Orthodox Church; Ethiopian Catholic Church; Eritrean Catholic Church; Coptic Catholic Church
- Major shrine: St. Takla Haymanot's Church (Alexandria); Debre Libanos, Ethiopia
- Feast: 30 August, December, every 24th day of the month, May 12 (Ethiopian Orthodox)
- Attributes: Man with wings on his back and only one leg visible
- Patronage: Ethiopians

Tekle Haymanot (Ge'ez: አቡነ ተክለ ሃይማኖት; known in the Coptic Church as Saint Takla Haymanot of Ethiopia; 1215–1313) was an Ethiopian saint and monk mostly venerated as a hermit. He was the Abuna of Ethiopia who founded a major monastery in his native province of Shewa. He is significant for being the only Ethiopian saint popular both amongst Ethiopians and outside that country. Tekle Haymanot "is the only Ethiopian saint celebrated officially in foreign churches such as Rome and Egypt." His feast day is 30 August (Nehasə 24 in Ethiopian calendar), and the 24th day of every month in the Ethiopian calendar is dedicated to Tekle Haymanot.

== Early life ==
Tekle Haymanot was born in Zorare, a district in Selale which lies on the eastern edge of Shewa where his Christian Aksumite family had migrated from the north around the time of the decline of Axum. Tekle Haymanot was Amhara and belonged to the long-established Christian population of northern Shewa. His hagiographical tradition traces his family's southward migration through Bete Amhara and into Shewa: an early ancestor is said to have settled in Amhara eighteen generations before Tekle Haymanot, while another settled in Shewa ten generations before his birth. Historian Taddesse Tamrat places this family tradition within the broader movement of Christian populations and Aksumite influence southward into Bete Amhara and Shewa following Aksum's decline. He was the son of the priest Tsega Zeab (ጸጋ ዘአብ "Grace of God") and his wife Egzi'e Haraya ("Choice of God"), who was also known as Sarah; Tekle Haymanot was born after his parents, who had failed to have children, pledged their firstborn to God.

During his youth, Shewa was subject to several devastating raids by Motolomi Sato, the pagan king of the Kingdom of Damot, which lay beyond the Jamma River. One of Matolomi's most notorious predations was the raid which led to the abduction of Egzi'e Haraya; she is said to have been reunited with Tsega Zeab through the intercession of the Archangel Michael. When Matolomi discovered they were escaping, he threw a spear which turned around in the air and slew him instead. There are several traditions like that describing Tekle Haymanot's interactions with King Matolomi.

His father gave Tekle Haymanot his earliest religious instruction. Later, he was ordained a priest by the Pope Cyril III of Alexandria (known as Kirollos in Coptic).

E. A. Wallis Budge states Tekle Haymanot was one of the first great teachers of Christian asceticism in Ethiopia, and is worthy to be classed with Anthony the Great, and Macarius of Egypt, and Pachomius of Egypt. He has always been held to the highest regard by Tewahedo Christians as the greatest Christian ascetic which their country has produced. His paternal and maternal ancestors were people of wealth and high social position, and his father ministered in the church of his city Zorare (in southern Bulga), and contributed to it considerable material support. His relatively early Christian education found so much success that Cyril, Bishop of ’Amhara, appointed him a deacon of the Church at the age of fifteen

== Later career ==
The first significant event in his life was when Tekle Haymanot, at the age of 30, travelled north to seek further religious education. His journey took him from Selale to Grarya, then Katata, Damot, Amhara, to end at the monastery of Iyasus Mo'a, who had only a few years before founded a monastery on an island in the middle of Lake Hayq in the district of Amba Sel (the present-day Amhara Region). There Tekle Haymanot studied under the abbot for nine years before travelling to Tigray, where he visited Axum, then stayed for a while at the monastery of Debre Damo, where he studied under Abbot Yohannes, Iyasus Mo'a's spiritual teacher. By this point he had developed a small group of followers, attracted by his reputation.

Eventually, Tekle Haymanot left Debre Damo with his followers to return to Shewa. En route, he stopped at the monastery of Iyasus Mo'a, where tradition states he received the full investiture of an Ethiopian monk's habit. The historian Taddesse Tamrat sees in the existing accounts of this act an attempt by later writers to justify the seniority of the monastery in Lake Hayq over the followers of Tekle Haymanot.

Once in Shewa, he introduced the spirit of renewal that Ethiopian Christianity was already experiencing in the northern provinces. He settled in the central area between Selale and Grarya, where he founded in 1284 the monastery of Debre Atsbo (renamed in the 15th century Debre Libanos). This monastery became one of the most important religious institutions of Ethiopia, founding a number of daughter houses while its abbot became one of the principal leaders of the Ethiopian Church, called the Ichege, second only to the Abuna. Emperor Zara Yaqob was heavily involved in promoting the longstanding pre-existing veneration and commemoration of St. Tekle Haymanot and strengthening the religious and political role of his monastery, Debre Libanos, and is associated with their rise to prominence over that of Tekle Haymanot’s teacher Iyasus Mo'a, his contemporary Ewostatewos, and Iyasus Mo’a’s Istifanos Monastery.

Tekle Haymanot lived for 29 years after the foundation of this monastery, dying in the year before Emperor Wedem Arad did; this would date Tekle Haymanot's death to 1313. He was first buried in the cave where he had originally lived as a hermit; almost 60 years later he was reinterred at Debre Libanos. In the 1950s, Emperor Haile Selassie constructed a new church at Debre Libanos Monastery over the site of the Haymanot's tomb. It remains a place of pilgrimage and a favored site for burial for many people across Ethiopia.

== Later traditions ==
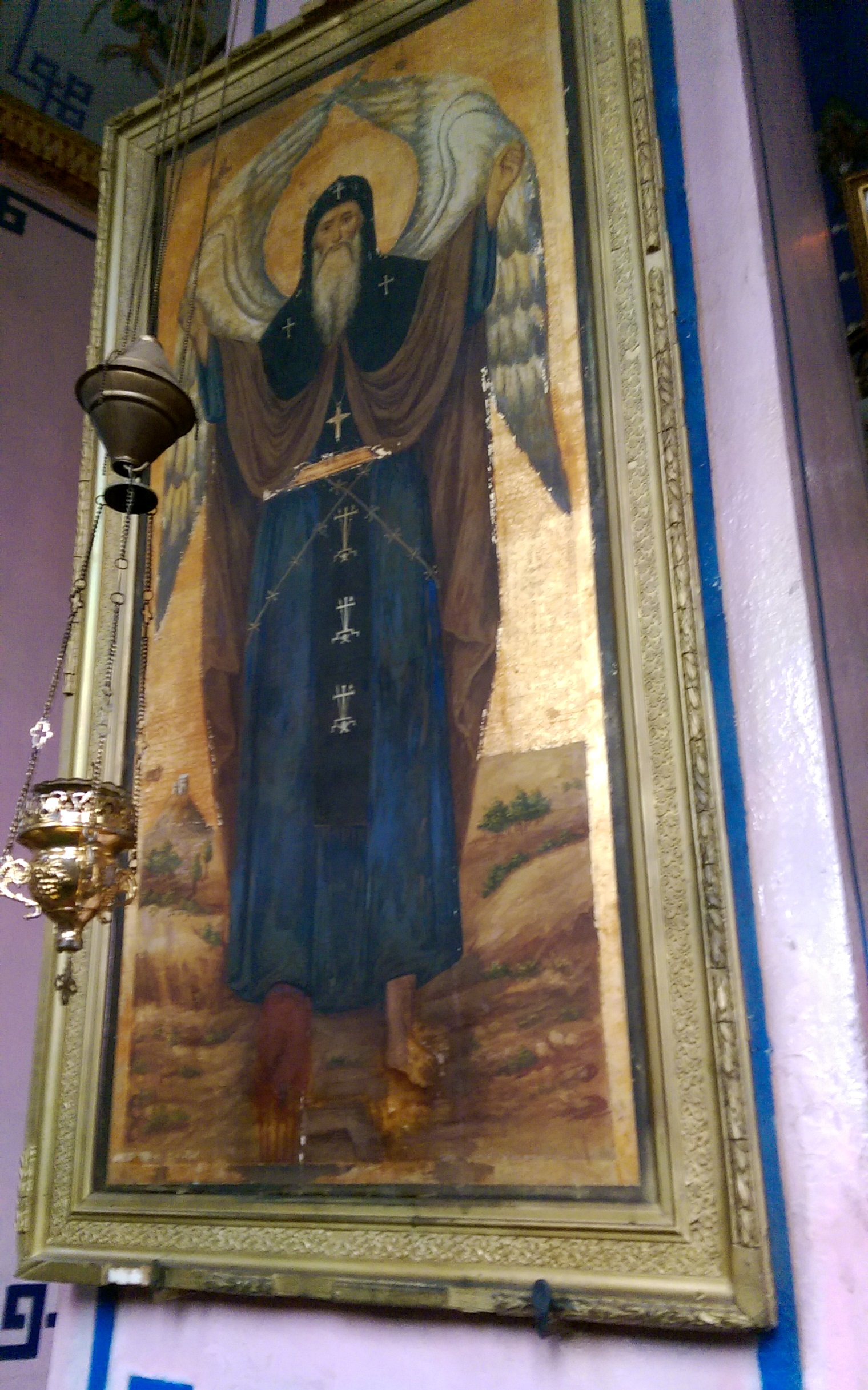
Icon of Tekle Haymanot in Jerusalem

Tekle Haymanot is frequently represented as an old man with wings on his back and only one leg visible. There are a number of explanations for this popular image. C.F. Beckingham and G.W.B. Huntingford recount one story, that Haymanot "having stood too long for about 34 years, one of his legs broke or cut while Satan was attempting to stop his prayers, whereupon he stood on one foot for 7 years." American C.I.A. officer Paul B. Henze describes his missing leg as appearing as a "severed leg ... in the lower left corner discreetly wrapped in a cloth." The British Lord, the Earl of Longford Thomas Pakenham alleged that the Prior of Debre Damo told the following story about how Tekle Haymanot received his wings:

One day he said he would go to Jerusalem to see the Garden of Gethsemane and the hill of the skull that is called Golgotha. But Shaitan (Satan) planned to stop Tekla Haymanot going on his journey to the Holy Land, and he cut the rope which led from the rock to the ground just as Tekla Haymanot started to climb down. Then God gave Tekla Haymanot six wings and he flew down to the valley below ... and from that day onwards Teklahaimanot would fly back and forth to Jerusalem above the clouds like an aeroplane.

Most later traditions hold that Tekle Haymanot played a significant role in the Solomonic Dynasty’s rise to power and Yekuno Amlak's ascension as the first monarch of the Ethiopian Empire, following two centuries of rule by the Zagwe dynasty after the collapse of the Kingdom of Aksum, although some historians like Taddesse Tamrat, G.W.B. Huntingford, Carlo Conti Rossini, and Simone Donati believe these are later inventions, as most older traditions credit Iyasus Mo'a with this achievement.

Another tradition credits Tekle Haymanot as the only Lek'e P'ap'as of Ethiopia who was born in Ethiopia and who was Ethiopian. The Christian population and Bishops of Ethiopia wanted Tekle Haimanot to become the Lek'e P'ap'as of Ethiopia. After the new Lek'e P'ap'as Abuna Yohannes from Egypt sent by the Patriarch of Alexandria arrived at Ethiopia he decided to separate: One part of Ethiopia to Tekle Haimanot and one part to himself, but Tekle Haimanot didn't want the high rank as Lek'e P'ap'as anymore and retired from his position to become a monk again.

A number of hagiographies of Haymanot have been written. G.W.B. Huntingford mentions two different gadlat: "one written by Abba Samuel of Waldiba in the first quarter of the 15th century and the other by one Gibra Maskel of Debre Libanos early in the 16th century". E.A. Wallis Budge has translated a third one, entitled The Life of Täklä Haymanot, which is attributed to one Täklä Sion. Tesfaye Gebre Mariam adds to these another version, popular at the monastery of Debre Libanos and containing far more details of Haymanot's life than any other version of the gadla, and which Tesfaye confirmed was written by Ichege Yohannis Kema.

== See also ==
- Coptic Christianity
- Ethiopian Orthodox Tewahedo Church
- St. Takla Haymanot's Church (Alexandria)
