= Istifanos Monastery =

Monastery in Ethiopia

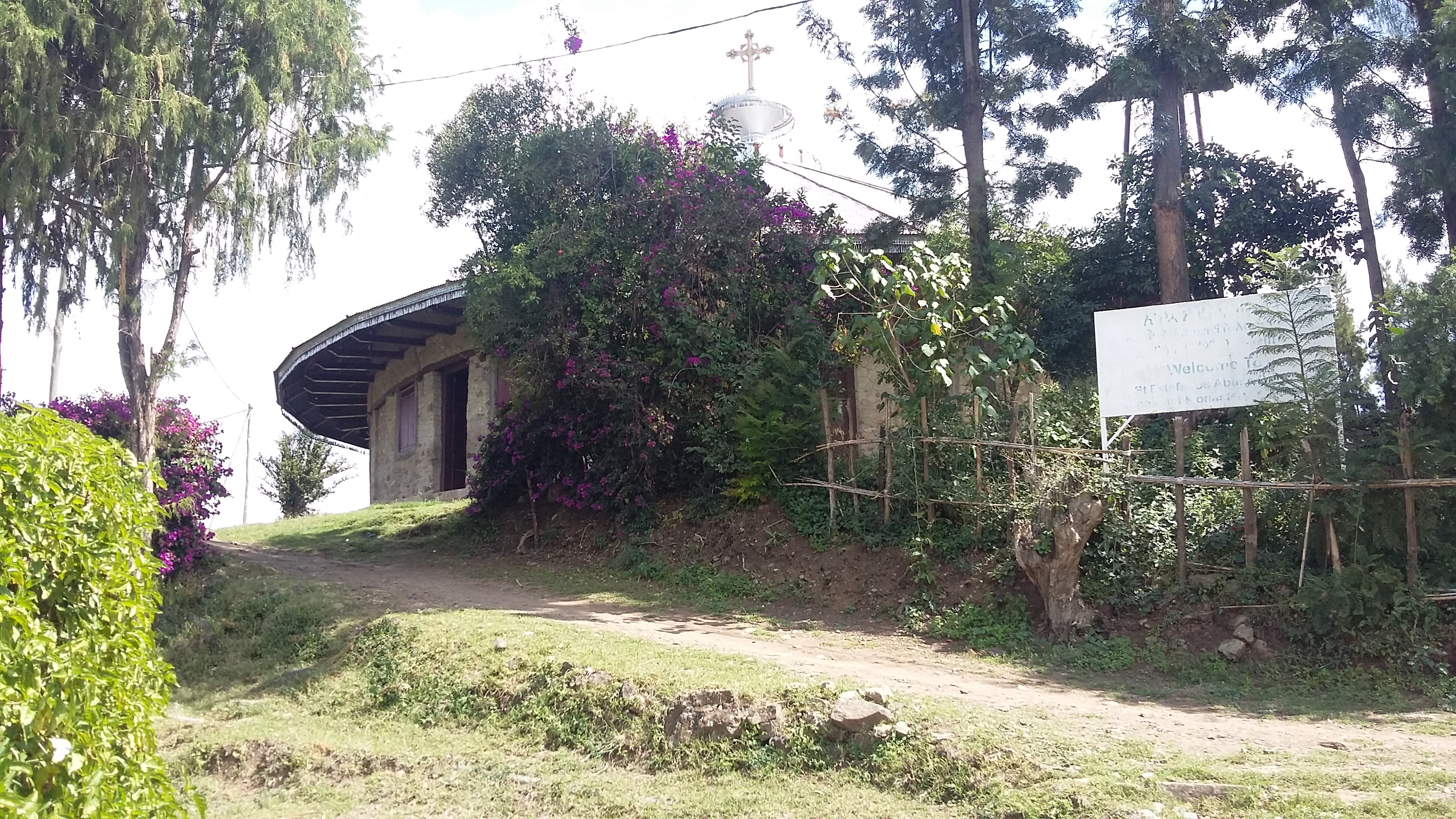

Religion
- Affiliation: Ethiopian Orthodox Tewahedo Church
- Status: Active

Location
- Location: Hayq, South Wollo, Ethiopia
- Interactive map of Istifanos Monastery
- Coordinates: 11.3387°N 39.6976°E

Istifanos Monastery (or St Stephen Monastery) is a monastery in Ethiopia, located in Lake Hayq. (The Stephen commemorated at the monastery is not the Saint Stephen of Acts.) The church structure was built around the 9th century by the Aksumite king Dil Na'od. In the 13th century, the church was converted into a monastery, in large part due to the work of Saint Iyasus Mo'a and later Emperor Yekuno Amlak.

== History ==
The monastery is responsible for producing five people, known as "Lights" (or important sources of knowledge and Christian salvation) of the Ethiopian Orthodox Tewahedo Church. One of these Lights was Saint Tekle Haymanot, who was educated in this monastery, and helped to convert Shewa and other southern provinces by ministering and building churches.

Istifanos Monastery was looted by Imam Ahmad ibn Ibrahim in 1531, who, upon coming upon the lake ordered the Arabs in his ranks to construct boats to reach the island. The first boats constructed, which were made out of wood beams bounded by cords, proved unsatisfactory; one of the Imam's followers suggested tying air sacs made of cow's skins to each raft, and this allowed the Imam's forces to sail across the lake to the monastery. Seeing that they were now defenseless, the monks of the monastery surrendered their valuables to prevent the destruction of their home.

== Notable possessions ==
Currently the monastery houses a number of ancient relics, which include a manuscript copy of the Book of the Gospels written around 1280; Egre-muk (or wooden-cuffs), a huge pot which ancient monks used to cook, and other 13th century objects.

Another prized relict is an icon of the Christ child sitting on his mother's knees, known as "The One Who Listens", which the monks believe is miraculous. Created in the 15th century, the icon was cleaned and repaired by a British charity, The Ethiopian Heritage Fund in 2010, and subsequently was housed in a special museum as the monastery.
