= Mille River =

River in Ethiopia

- Map of Ethiopia showing the Mille River

Location
- Country: Ethiopia
- Regions: Amhara, Afar

Physical characteristics
- Source: Ethiopian Highlands
  - coordinates: 11°10′30″N 39°41′54″E
  - elevation: 2,514 m (8,248 ft)
- Mouth: Tendaho Reservoir
  - coordinates: 11°26′44″N 40°56′38″E
  - elevation: 412 m (1,352 ft)
- Length: 215 km (134 mi)
- Basin size: 5,834 km^{2} (2,253 sq mi)
- Discharge
  - location: Mouth
  - average: 27.73 m^{3}/s (979 cu ft/s)
  - minimum: 3.13 m^{3}/s (111 cu ft/s)
  - maximum: 152.25 m^{3}/s (5,377 cu ft/s)

Basin features
- Progression: Awash → Lake Abbe
- River system: Awash Basin
- Population: 817,000

The Mille River is a river of Ethiopia and a tributary of the Awash. It drains parts of the Semien (North) Wollo and Debub (South) Wollo Zones of the Amhara Region, as well as Administrative Zone 4 of the Afar Region. The explorer L.M. Nesbitt, who travelled through the area in 1928, was impressed by its size, and described the Mille as "probably the only real river which joins the Awash". The Ala River (A'ura) and Golima River (Golina) are small tributaries of the Mille.

The Mille River rises in the Ethiopian Highlands west of Sulula in Tehuledere woreda in Amhara Region. It flows first to the north, then curves to run east to its confluence with the Awash at 11°25′N 40°58′E.

== See also ==
- List of rivers of Ethiopia
