= Lake Hayq =

Freshwater lake in northern Ethiopia

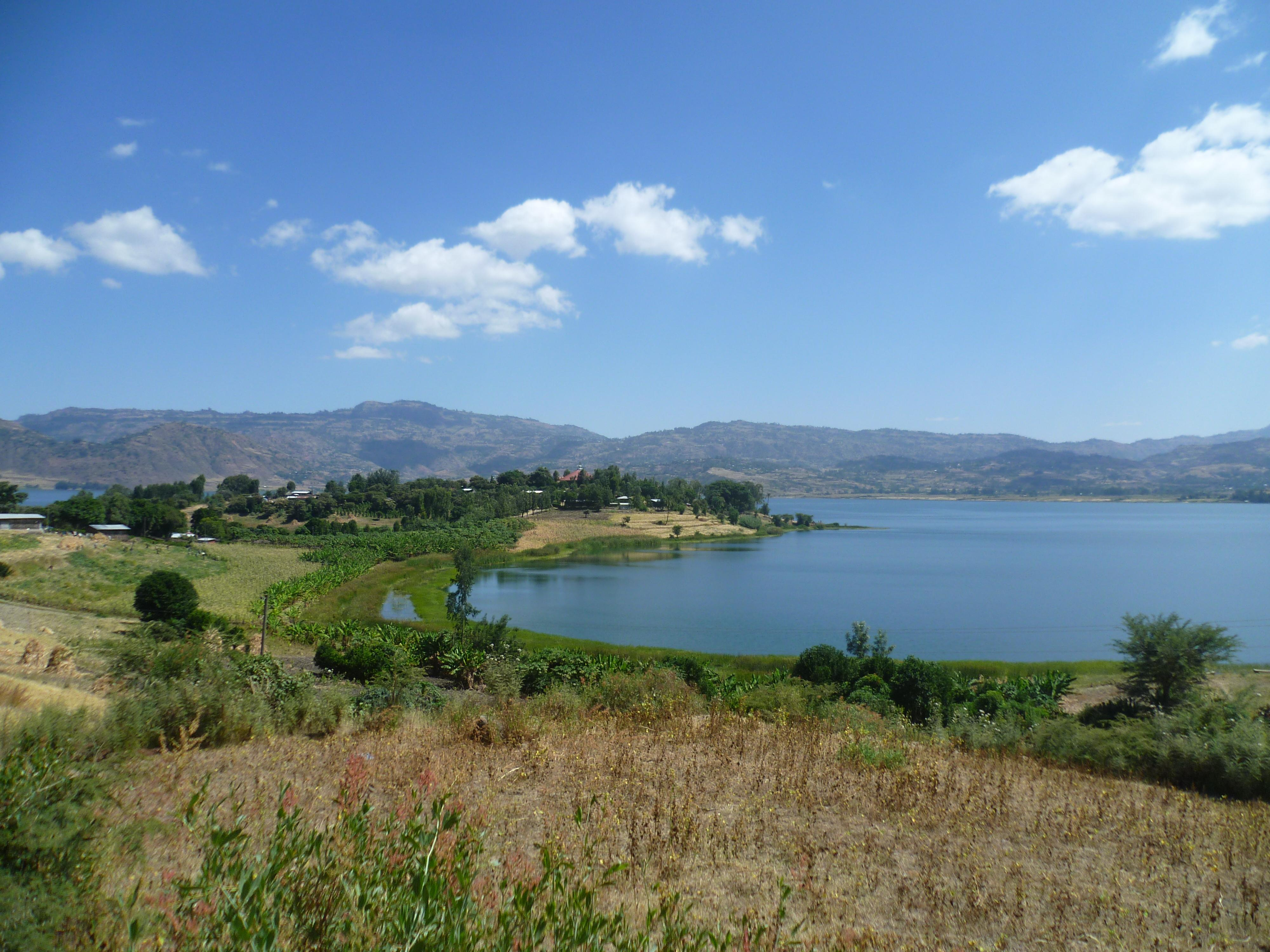
- Lake Hayq

- Location within Ethiopia
- Coordinates: 11°20′N 39°43′E
- Primary outflows: none
- Basin countries: Ethiopia
- Max. length: 6.7 km (4.2 mi)
- Max. width: 6 km (3.7 mi)
- Surface area: 23 km^{2} (8.9 sq mi)
- Max. depth: 88 m (289 ft)
- Surface elevation: 2,030 m (6,660 ft)

Lake Hayq (Amharic: ሐይቅ ሐይቅ, transl. "Lake Lake") is a freshwater lake of Ethiopia. It is located north of Dessie, in the Debub Wollo Zone of the Amhara Region. The town of Hayq is to the west of the lake.

Lake Hayq is 6.7 km long and 6 km wide, with a surface area of 23 km². It has a maximum depth of 88 m and is at an elevation of 2,030 meters above sea level. It is one of two lakes in the Tehuledere woreda.

== History ==
According to a local legend, the lake was created to avenge a pregnant woman who was wronged by a princess. God was greatly angered by this injustice, and in his wrath turned all of the land surrounding the woman (except the ground she was sitting on) into the water forming a lake, destroying the princess along with her friends and family in the process. Where the pregnant woman was sitting became an island (now a peninsula) where Istifanos Monastery, founded in the middle of the 13th century by Iyasus Mo'a, is located.

A former student of Iyasus Mo'a, Tekle Haymanot, went on to found the monastery of Debra Asbos (renamed in the 15th century to Debre Libanos) in Shewa. Tekle Haymanot was one of five bright young religious students who became the "five lights of Christianity" for the south of Ethiopia. Iyasus Mo'a also played a role in Yekuno Amlak's overthrow of the Zagwe dynasty, and helped restore the Solomonic dynasty. Upon Yekuno Amlak's ascension to the throne, Istifanos Church became Istifanos Monastery.

The first known European to view the lake was Francisco Álvares, who passed near it 21 September 1520. He mentions the lake had hippopotamuses and catfish, and the land around it was planted in lemons, oranges, and citrons. Imam Ahmad ibn Ibrahim al-Ghazi looted and burned this church in November, 1531. The ruins of the church are still visible, and the legend states that the kings and princes who lived in that palace established the church.
