= South Wollo Zone =

Zone in Amhara Region of Ethiopia

Coordinates: 11°00′N 39°15′E

South Wollo ደቡብ ወሎ
- Zone
- Interactive map of South Wollo
- Country: Ethiopia
- Region: Amhara
- Largest city: Dessie

Area
  - Total: 17,067.45 km^{2} (6,589.78 sq mi)

Population (2007)
  - Total: 2,518,862
  - Estimate (2012): 2,758,199
  - Density: 147.58/km^{2} (382.24/sq mi)

Map of the regions and zones of Ethiopia

South Wollo (Amharic: ደቡብ ወሎ) is a zone in the Amhara Region of Ethiopia. It acquired its name from the former province of Wollo. South Wollo is bordered on the south by North Shewa and the Oromia Special Zone (Amhara), on the west by East Gojjam, on the northwest by South Gondar, on the north by North Wollo, on the northeast by Afar Region, and on the east by the Oromia Special Zone and the Argobba special woreda. Its highest point is Mount Tabor in Amhara Sayint, 4247 meter above sea level. Cities in South Wollo include Kombolcha, Hayq, Dessie, Wuchale, Wogel Tena and Wurgessa.

On 24 August 2009 Zonal authorities announced that approximately 540 safe water units were constructed during the past Ethiopian budget year at a cost of over 23 million birr, while another 878 units were repaired. This has improved the access to safe water from 51% to 61% of the Zone's inhabitants.

== Demographics ==
A 2012 estimate puts the population at 2,758,199. This gives a population density of 161.49 people per square kilometer (418.56 people per square mile), given its area of 17,067.45 square kilometers (6,589.78 square miles).

Based on the 2007 Census conducted by the Central Statistical Agency of Ethiopia (CSA), this Zone has a total population of 2,518,862, an increase of 18.60% over the 1994 census, of whom 1,248,698 are men and 1,270,164 women; with an area of 17,067.45 square kilometers, South Wollo has a population density of 147.58. While 301,638 or 11.98% are urban inhabitants, a further 3 individuals were reported to be pastoralists. A total of 1598,447 households were counted in this Zone, which results in an average of 4.21 persons to a household, and 1574,378 housing units. The 1994 national census reported a total population for this Zone of 4,123,803 in 498,480 households, of whom 2,047,512 were men and 2,076,291 women; 1,210,291 or 9.9% of its population were urban dwellers at the time.

In 1994 the two largest ethnic groups reported in South Wollo were the Amhara (96.68%), and the Oromo (2.78%); all other ethnic groups made up 0.54% of the population. Amharic was spoken as a first language by 96.45%, and 3.13% spoke Oromiffa; the remaining 0.42% spoke all other primary languages reported. This had changed little by 2007, when the largest ethnic group reported in South Wollo was still the Amhara with 96.33% and all other ethnic groups made up 3.67% of the population. Amharic is spoken as a first language by 98.65%; the remaining 1.35% spoke all other primary languages reported. 65.89% were Muslim, and 34.11% of the population said they practiced Ethiopian Orthodox Christianity.

According to a May 24, 2004 World Bank memorandum, 13% of the inhabitants of South Wollo have access to electricity, this zone has a road density of 76.1 kilometers per 1000 square kilometers (compared to the national average of 30 kilometers), the average rural household has 0.7 hectare of land (compared to the national average of 1.01 hectare of land and an average of 0.75 for the Amhara Region) and the equivalent of 0.6 heads of livestock. 10.6% of the population is in non-farm related jobs, compared to the national average of 25% and a regional average of 21%. 63% of all eligible children are enrolled in primary school, and 12% in secondary schools. 45% of the zone is exposed to malaria, and none to tsetse fly. The memorandum gave this zone a drought risk rating of 557.
