= Dawuntna Delant =

Coordinates: 11°45′N 39°00′E

Dawuntna Delant ("Dewunt and Delant") was one of the 105 woredas in the Amhara Region of Ethiopia. Part of the Semien Wollo Zone, Dawuntna Delant was bordered on the south by the Checheho River which separated it from the Debub Wollo Zone, on the west by the Debub Gondar Zone, on the north by Wadla, and on the east by Guba Lafto. The deep valley of the Zhit'a river, which runs through Wadla and along part of the northern border, effectively isolates much of Dawuntna Delant from the rest of Semien Wollo. This woreda was named after two historical districts, Dawunt to the east and Delanta to the west. The major town in Dawuntna Delant was Wegeltena. This woreda was separated for Dawunt and Delanta woredas.

== Overview ==
The altitude of this woreda ranges from 700 to 3900 meters above sea level. The eastern part has been described as "a mass of columnar basalt between the rivers Jitta and Beshilo, with its surface upwards of 9000 feet above the level of the sea." Notable peaks include Amba Koheit, Amba Nebiet, and Mount Constantina. Dawuntna Delant, as well as the other seven rural woredas of this Zone, has been grouped amongst the 48 woredas identified as the most drought prone and food insecure in the Amhara Region.

Landmarks in this woreda include the church of Yaddiba Maryam, notable for its wall paintings that David Buxton has dated to the fifteenth and sixteenth centuries "before the massive impact of external influences that occurred in the seventeenth century." Subjects depicted in these paintings include the Biblical Kings David with a harp and Solomon with a sword, and the Christian martyr Mammes "riding a rather comical lion."

== Demographics ==
Based on figures published by the Central Statistical Agency in 2005, this woreda has an estimated total population of 197,372, of whom 98,296 are men and 99,076 are women; 7,205 or 3.65% of its population are urban dwellers, which is less than the Zone average of 8.9%. With an estimated area of 1,583.46 square kilometers, Dawuntna Delant has an estimated population density of 124.6 people per square kilometer, which is greater than the Zone average of 105.59.

The 1994 national census reported a total population for this woreda of 145,401 in 35,527 households, of whom 73,832 were men and 71,569 were women; 4,166 or 2.87% of its population were urban dwellers. The largest ethnic group reported in Dawuntna Delant was the Amhara (99.96%). Amharic was spoken as a first language by 99.96%. 89.04% of the population practiced Ethiopian Orthodox Christianity, and 10.94% of the population said they were Muslim.
