= Muja, Ethiopia =

Muja (Amharic: ሙጃ) is a town in northern Ethiopia. Part of the Semien Wollo Zone of the Amhara Region, this town has a latitude and longitude of 12°04′N 39°27′E with an elevation of 2918 meters above sea level.

== History ==
Muja is one of the oldest town in the province of Lasta next to the mighty Lalibela. Muja was founded during the era of Zemene Mesafint by the notable Weresekh (ወረሴክ) rulers Dejazmach Birru Aligaz and Dejazmach Faris Aligaz both are the sons of Aligaz of Yejju (died 1803) and he was also the Ras of Begemder, and Inderase (regent) of the Emperor of Ethiopia for more than six years. This makes the establishment of the town prior to the reign of Emperor Theodore II. The British expedition against Emperor Tewodros II encamped near Muja in 1868, at a site referred to as "Muja Camp". Leul Ras Kassa's father Dejazmach Hailu Wolde Kiros made this town as an Administrative center of Lasta since from the reign of Emperor Tekle Giyorgis

During the Second Italo-Abyssinian War the Ethiopian army commanded by Leul Ras Kassa Hailu was camped in the town on their way to Tembien front. Muja was visited by Beatrice Playne around 1950, who found while the town "was really quite a large place and had once been flourishing", it now had "a feeling of neglect and decay" since local government offices and the police station had been moved to a nearby settlement she called "Kulmus". Her description of Muja ends with the observation, "On the hill above the town a number of old Italian buildings, which had once served as government offices, were beginning to disintegrate."

== Demographics ==
Based on figures from the Central Statistical Agency in 2005, Muja has an estimated total population of 5,531 of whom 2,669 are men and 2,862 are women. The 1994 census reported it had a total population of 2,045 of whom 878 were men and 1,167 were women. Muja was once a capital town for Lasta Awuraja for a short period, in the present time the town is serving as an administrative center of Gidan woreda.
