= Dawunt =

District in Amhara Region, Ethiopia

Dawunt ዳውንት
- Woreda
- Flag
- Zone: Semien Wollo
- Region: Amhara

Area
  - Total: 618.20 km^{2} (238.69 sq mi)

Population (2012 est.)
  - Total: 70,464
  - Density: 113.98/km^{2} (295.21/sq mi)

Dawunt (Amharic: ዳውንት) is a woreda in Amhara Region, Ethiopia. Part of the Semien (North) Wollo Zone, Dawunt is bordered on the south by the Checheho River which separated it from the Debub Wollo Zone, on the west by the Semien Gondar Zone, on the northwest by Meket, on the north by Wadla, and on the east by Delanta. Dawunt was part of former Dawuntna Delant woreda.

One landmark of this woreda is the cave church Debre Abuna Muse, also locally called Yadibba Maryam. It is notable for the quality of the paintings on its walls and ceiling. "The style is archaic," writes S. Wright, "recalling manuscript illuminations of the fourteenth century. The subjects are not unusual; historical figures include the kings Yemràhanna-Krestos and Lâlibalâ, but early saints and patriarchs predominate."

== Demographics ==
A 2012 estimate puts the population at 70,464. This gives a population density of 113.98 people per square kilometer (295.21 people per square mile), given its area of 618.20 square kilometers (238.69 square miles), lower than the North Wollo Zone average of 134.66 people per square kilometer (348.76 people per square mile).

Based on the 2007 national census conducted by the Central Statistical Agency of Ethiopia (CSA), this woreda has a total population of 65,363, of whom 33,310 are men and 32,053 women; 528 or 0.81% are urban inhabitants.

The majority of the inhabitants practiced Ethiopian Orthodox Christianity, with 77.98% reporting that as their religion, while 21.98% of the population said they were Muslim.
