= Wurgessa =

Town in northern Ethiopia

Wurgessa ውርጌሳ
- Town
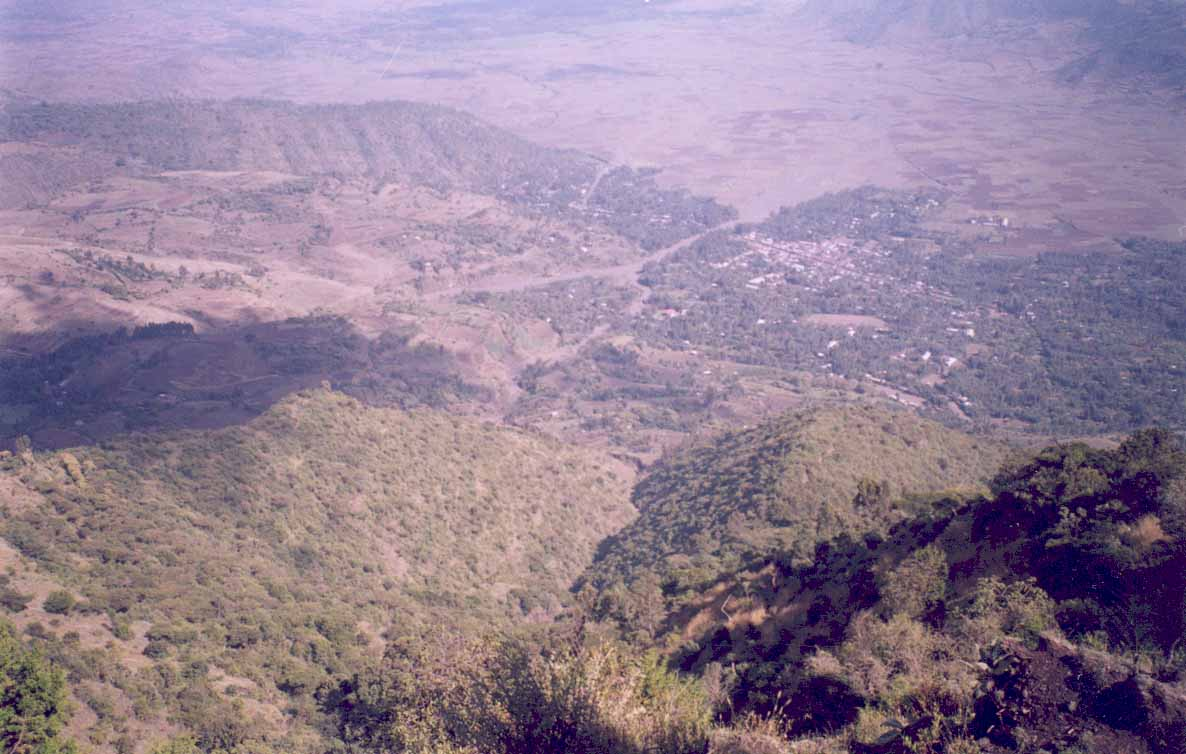

- Location within Ethiopia
- Coordinates: 11°32.58′N 39°37.1′E
- Country: Ethiopia
- Region: Amhara
- Zone: Semien Wollo
- District: Habru
- Elevation: 1,600 m (5,200 ft)
- Time zone: UTC+3 (EAT)

Wurgessa (Amharic: ውርጌሳ) is a small town located in the district of Habru, in the North Wollo zone of the Amhara Region, Ethiopia. Wurgessa is located along Ethiopian Highway 2, or Kombolcha – Woldiya road, 465 km from Addis Ababa and 25 km south of the woreda (district) town Mersa. Wurgessa is the birthplace of the late comedian Alebachew Teka.

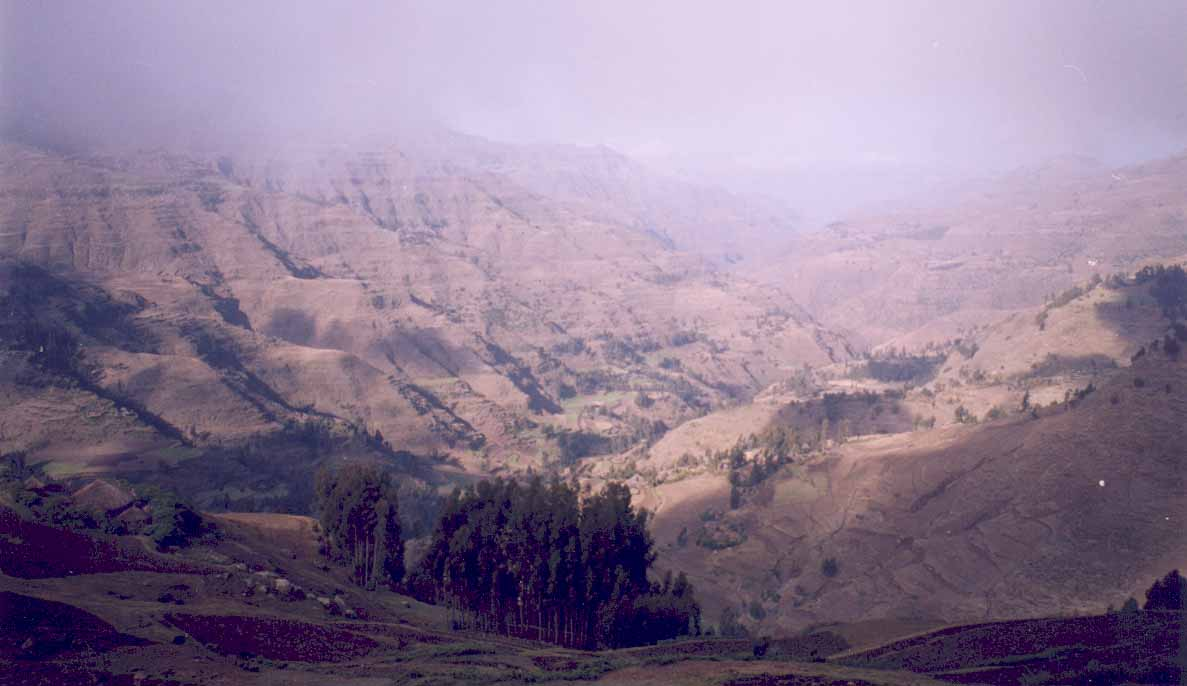
Surroundings of Gatira, a hamlet of Wurgesa

== Landscape setting ==
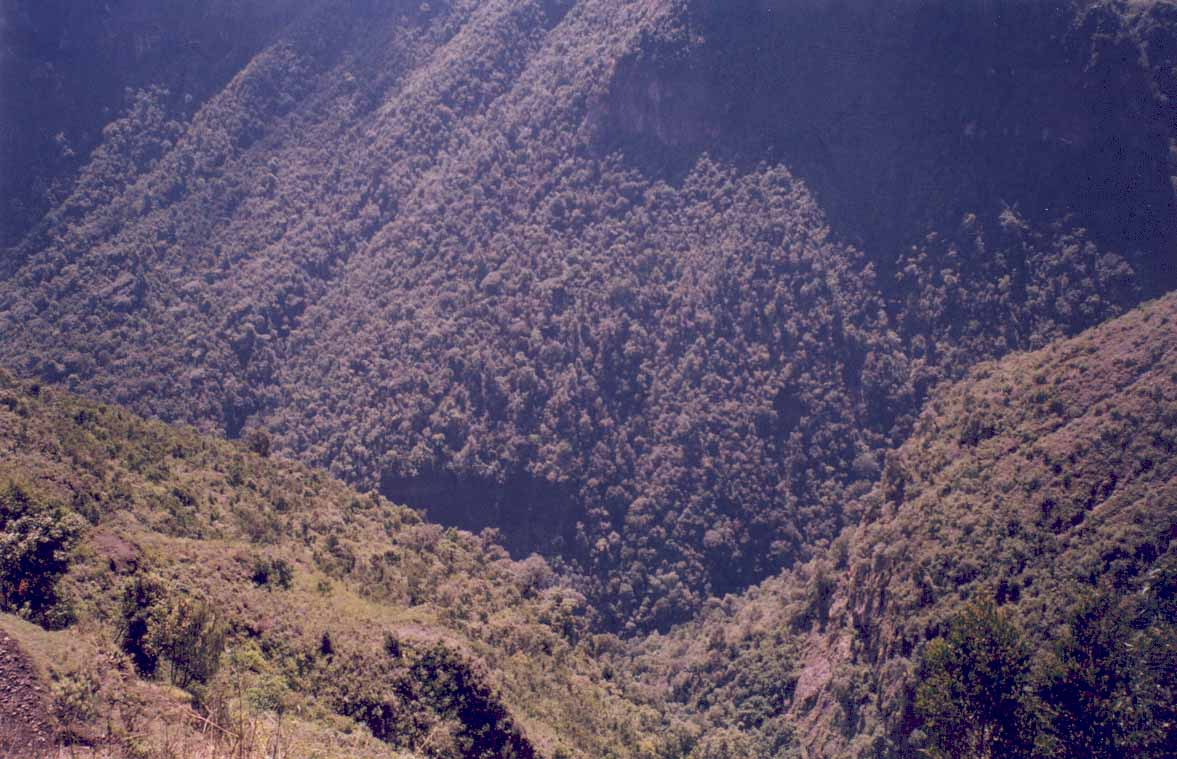
View on the Gemshat forest, high above Wurgesa

Wurgessa is located at the foot of a steep escarpment, which reaches up to 3600 m high. On top of the escarpment, the landscape is also mountainous but there are croplands. The escarpment is steep and comprises many cliffs and forests, with intermediate hamlets on narrow flats.

=== Trekking down to Wurgesa from the highlands ===
A mountain trek can be undertaken from Wegel Tena towards Wurgesa. Starting from Wegel Tena one walks to the east and descends into the gorge, through Ferkake. Cross the wide river and follow it upstream for some 10 kilometers towards the village of Dibil which is on a small plateau high above the river. From Dibil, follow the ridge, eastbound, until reaching the top of the escarpment at Angwat. There are magnificent views over Gemshat forest but it is impossible to climb down across the forest. The trekker will continue walking in the eastern direction (steeply downslope) towards Gatira, and from Gatira to Wurgesa. The trek takes 2 days; accommodation can be found in villages along the trek route but there are hardly any shops.

=== Photo and map gallery: mountain trek Angwat-Gatira-Wurgesa ===
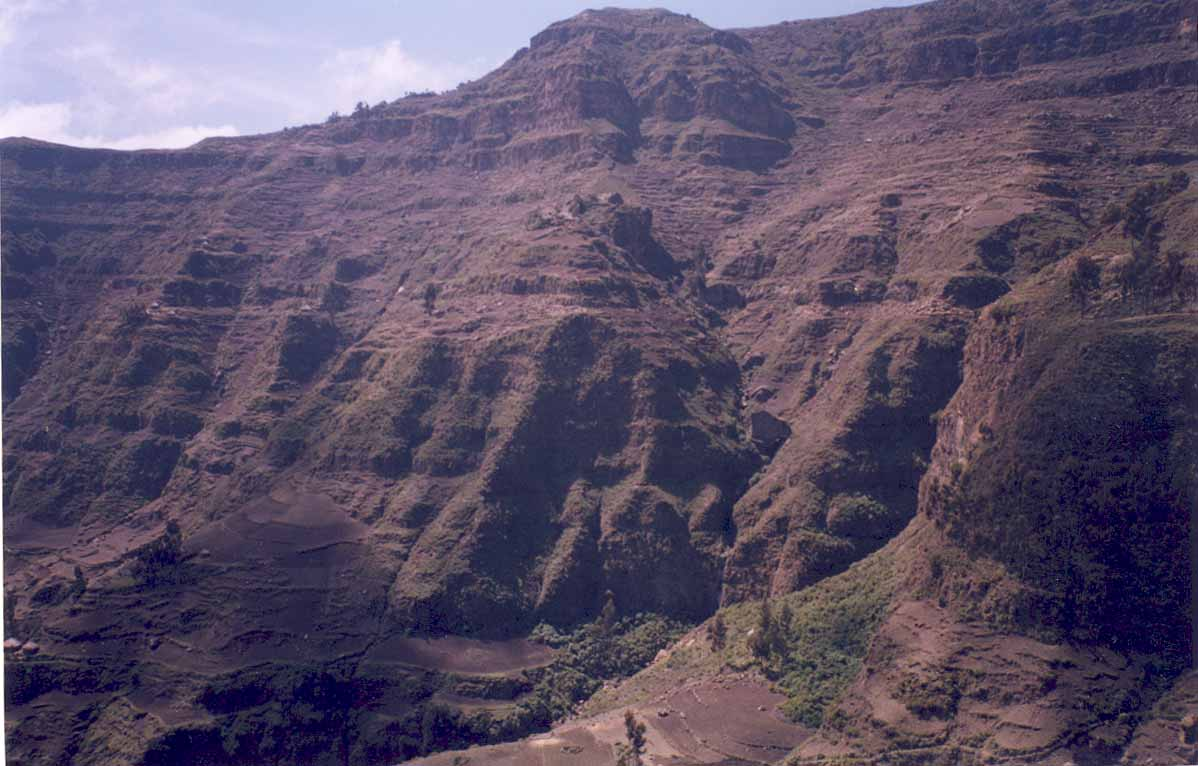

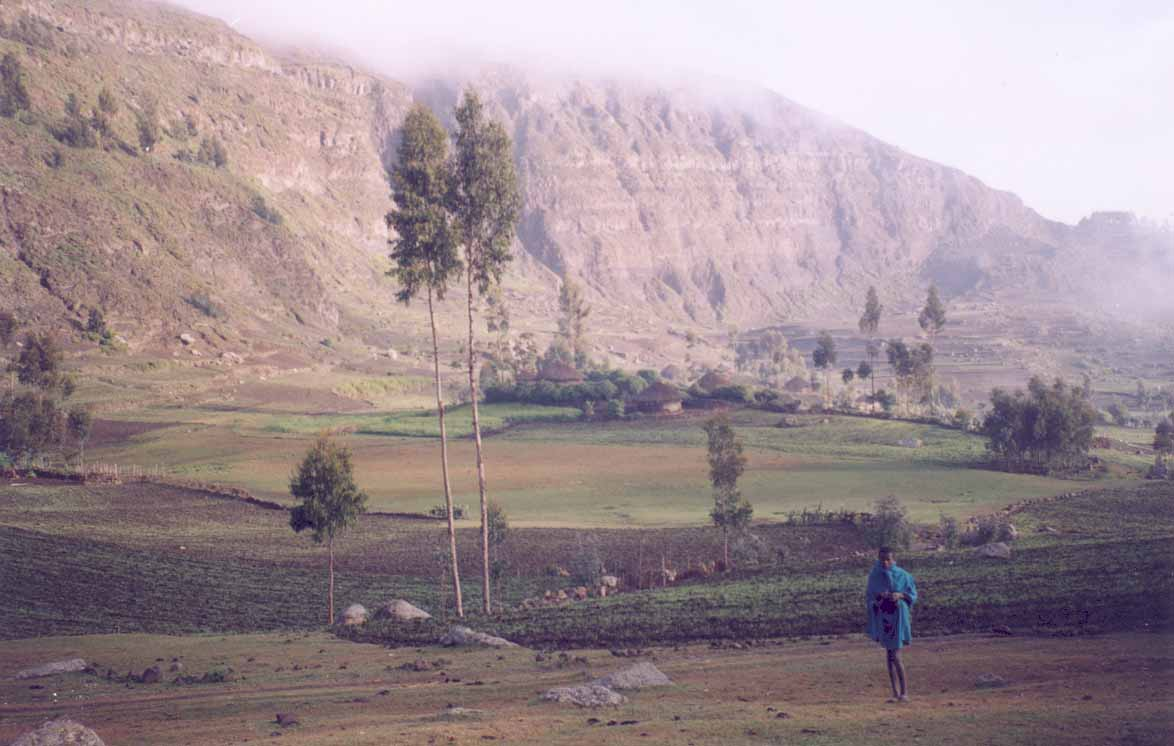

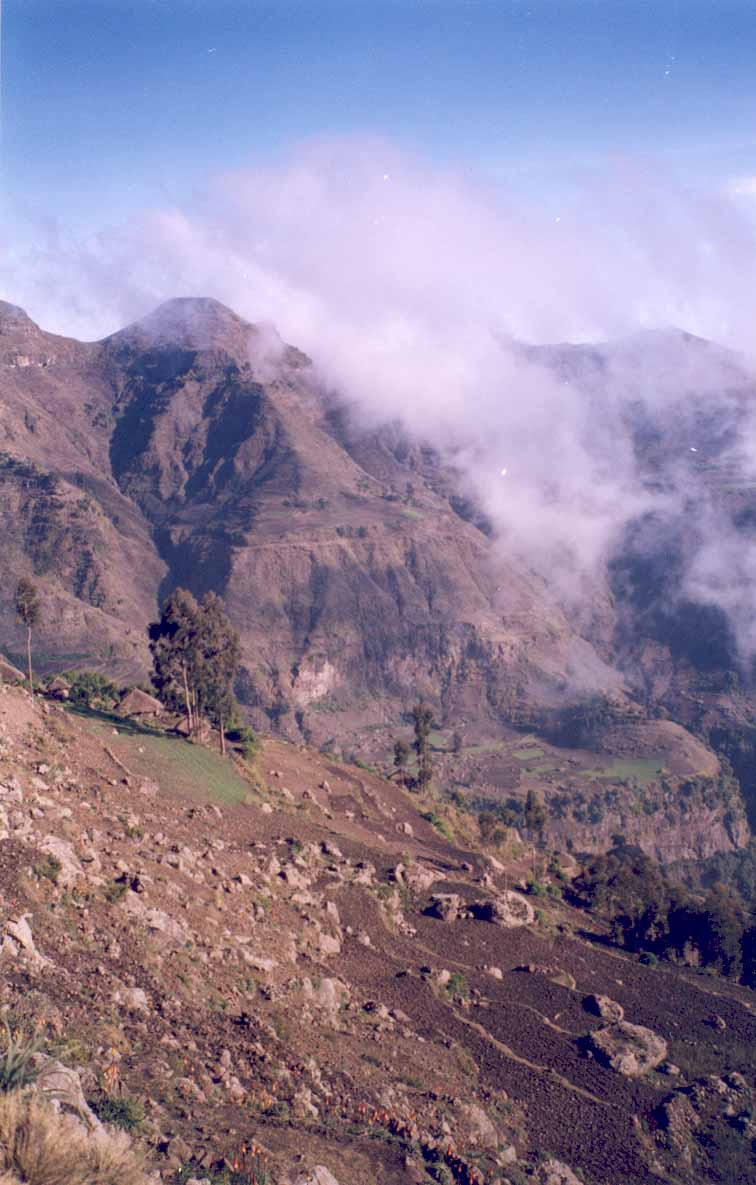

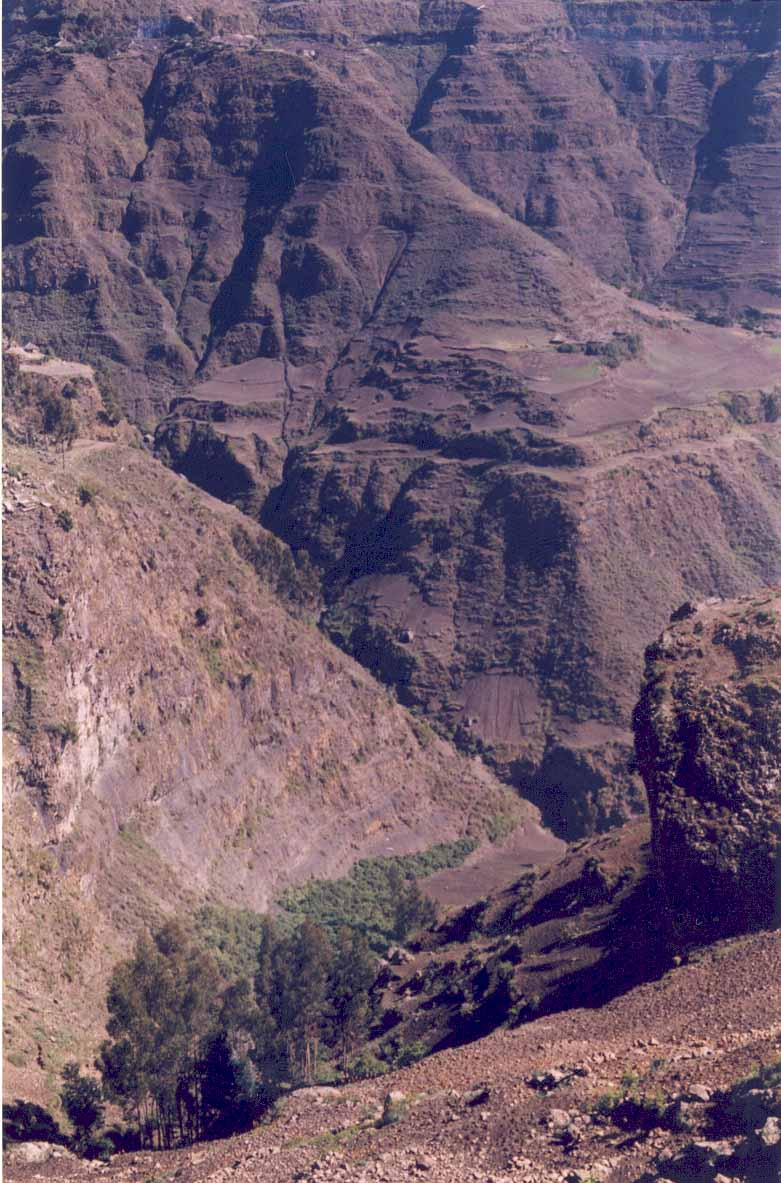

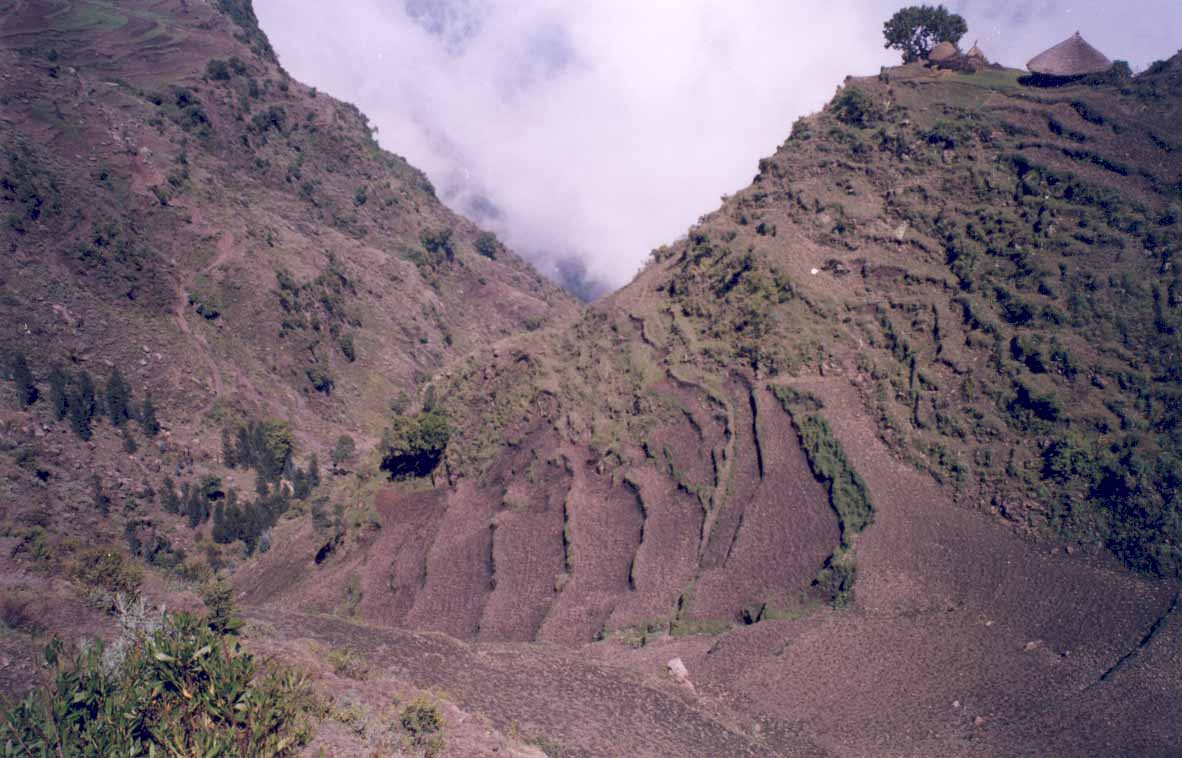

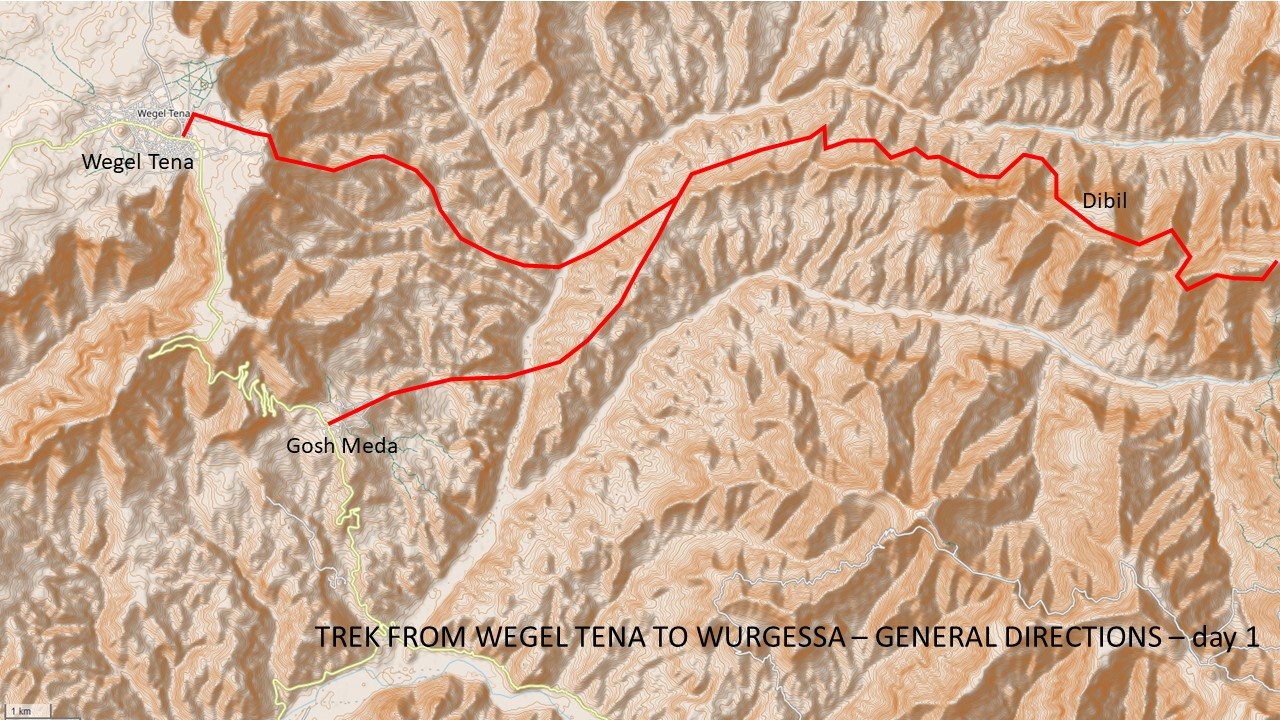
First part of trekking route (basemap: OpenStreetMap)

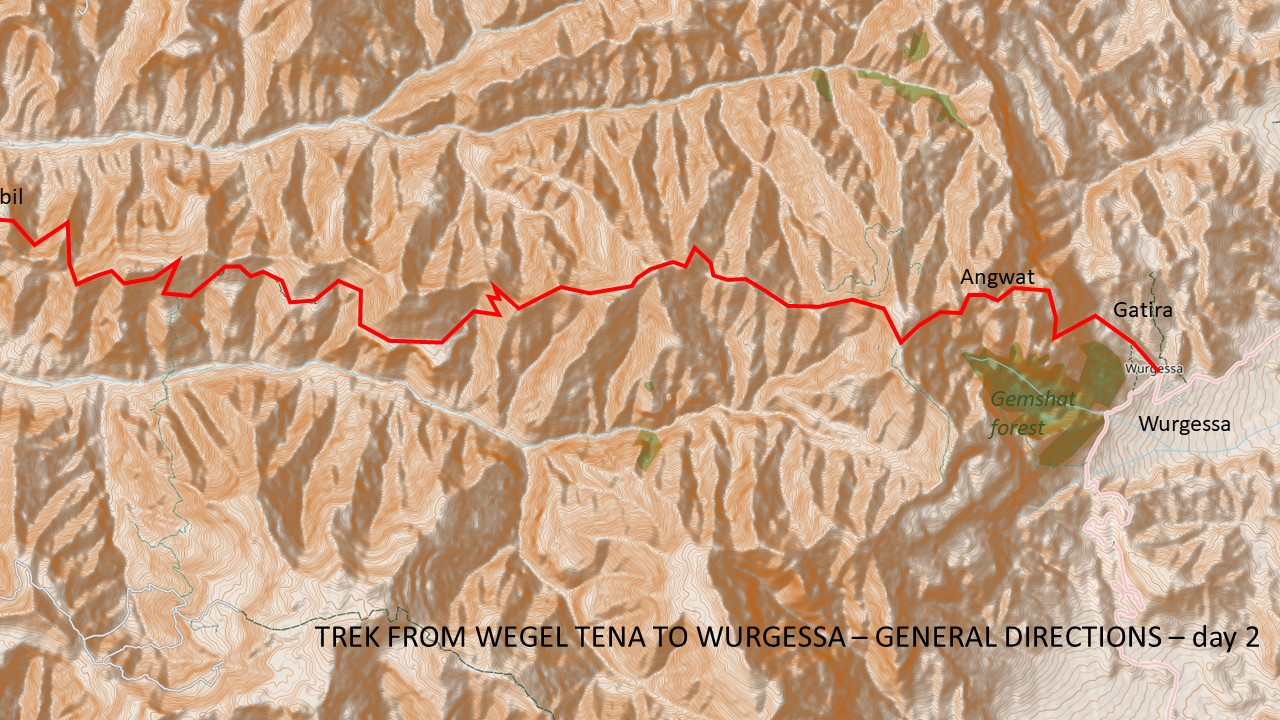
Second part of trekking route (basemap: OpenStreetMap)
