= Meket =

District in Amhara Region, Ethiopia

Coordinates: 12°00′N 38°45′E

Meket መቄት
- Woreda
- Flag
- Interactive map of Meket
- Country: Ethiopia
- Region: Amhara
- Zone: Semien Wollo

Area
  - Total: 1,909.25 km^{2} (737.17 sq mi)

Population (2012 est.)
  - Total: 245,840
  - Density: 128.76/km^{2} (333.49/sq mi)

Meket (Amharic: መቄት) is a woreda in Amhara Region, Ethiopia. It is named after a former district located approximately in this area. Located on the western side of the Semien Wollo Zone, Meket is bordered on the south by Wadla and Dawunt, on the west by the Debub Gondar Zone, on the northwest by Bugna, on the north by Lasta, on the northeast by Gidan, and on the east by Guba Lafto. The administrative center of Meket is Filakit Gereger; other settlements include Debre Zebit and Weketa.

== Overview ==
Meket was historically part of Begemder province and a district of it.

A landmark of this woreda is the monastery of Debra Abuna Aron, notable for its cave church. Local tradition tells that one of its chambers has "the remarkable property of allowing a man to stand in the middle of it and read a book while it was pouring with rain, without being touched by a single drop of water, although there was nothing between his head and the sky."

This woreda extends from the divide between the Tekezé and Bashilo watersheds northwards, with elevations ranging from about 1200 at the northwesternmost point to over 3000 meters above sea level along the eastern part of its southern border. Rivers include the Checheho which has its source in this woreda. Filakit Gereger lies on the main Debre Tabor - Nefas Mewcha highway (also known as the Chinese road), and except for those of the eastern lowland woredas it is the only woreda capital with an all-year link to the Zonal capital of Weldiya.

Meket, as well as the other seven rural woredas of this Zone, has been grouped amongst the 48 woredas identified as the most drought prone and food insecure in the Amhara Region. To combat increasing droughts and improve crop yields, two irrigation projects have been undertaken in this woreda by the Commission for Sustainable Agriculture and Environmental Rehabilitation in the Amhara Region, affecting 75 hectares and benefiting 270 households.

== Demographics ==
A 2012 estimate puts the population at 245,840. This gives a population density of 128.76 people per square kilometer (333.49 people per square mile), given its area of 1909.25 square kilometers (737.17 square miles), slightly lower than the North Wollo Zone average of 134.66 people per square kilometer (348.76 people per square mile).

Based on the 2007 national census conducted by the Central Statistical Agency of Ethiopia (CSA), this woreda has a total population of 226,644, an increase of 17.02% over the 1994 census, of whom 114,398 are men and 112,246 women; 11,750 or 5.18% are urban inhabitants. With an area of 1,909.25 square kilometers, Meket has a population density of 118.71 people per square kilometer (307.45 people per square mile), which is less than the Zone average of 123.25 people per square kilometer (319.22 people per square mile). A total of 50,478 households were counted in this woreda, resulting in an average of 4.49 persons to a household, and 49,078 housing units.

The 1994 national census reported a total population for this woreda of 193,683 in 44,142 households, of whom 98,249 were men and 95,434 were women; 4,761 or 2.46% of its population were urban dwellers.

The largest ethnic group reported in Meket was the Amhara (99.95%). Amharic was spoken as a first language by 99.77%. The majority of the population practiced Ethiopian Orthodox Christianity with 94.69% professing this belief, while 5.3% of the population said they were Muslim. By 2007 this had changed slightly with 95.26% reporting Ethiopian Orthodox Christianity as their religion, while 4.72% of the population said they were Muslim.
