= Lasta (woreda) =

Lasta ላስታ
- Woreda
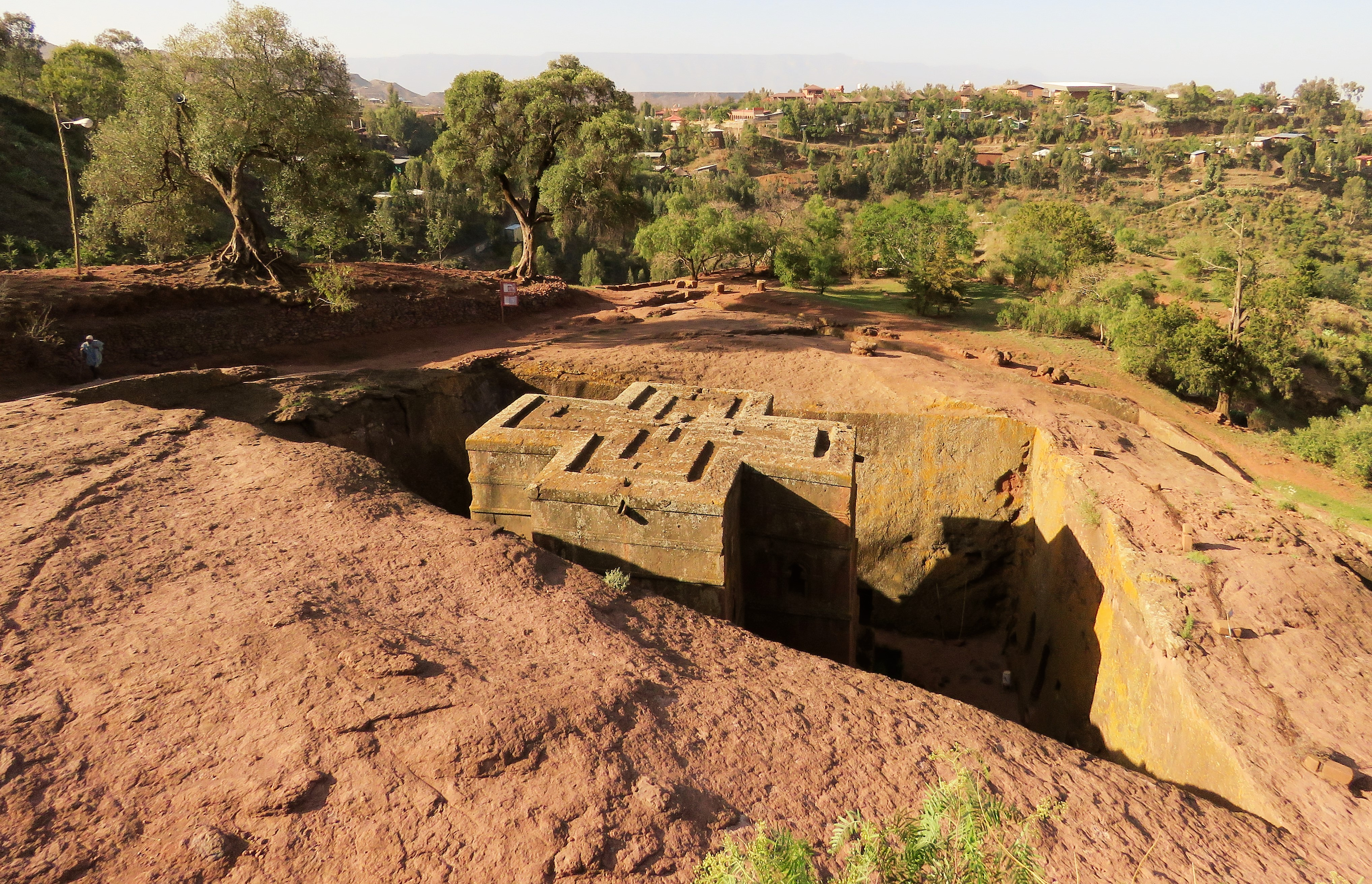

- Flag
- Interactive map of Lasta
- Country: Ethiopia
- Region: Amhara
- Zone: Semien Wollo

Area
  - Total: 1,119.35 km^{2} (432.18 sq mi)

Population (2012)
  - Total: 129,464
  - Density: 115.66/km^{2} (299.56/sq mi)

Lasta (Amharic: ላስታ) is a woreda (district) in the Semien Wollo Zone (North Wollo) of the Amhara Region of Ethiopia. It is bordered on the south by Meket woreda, on the west by Bugna woreda, on the north by Wag Hemra Zone, and on the east by Gidan woreda. Its major town is Lalibela, known for its monolithic churches. Lasta split off from the Bugna woreda.

== Demographics ==
A 2012 estimate puts the population at 129,464. This gives a population density of 115.66 people per square kilometer (299.56 people per square mile), given its area of 1119.35 square kilometers (432.18 square miles), lower than the North Wollo Zone average of 134.66 people per square kilometer (348.76 people per square mile).

Based on the 2007 national census conducted by the Central Statistical Agency of Ethiopia (CSA), Lasta woreda has a total population of 117,777, of whom 58,451 are men and 59,326 women; 17,367 or 14.75% are urban inhabitants.

The majority of the inhabitants practiced Ethiopian Orthodox Christianity, with 97.65% reporting that as their religion, while 2.32% of the population said they were Muslim.

== See also ==
- Lasta, the historic district
