= Alebachew Teka =

Ethiopian comedian and television personality (1962–2005)

- Born: 1962; Wurgessa, Wollo Province, Ethiopian Empire (now North Wollo Zone, Ethiopia)
- Died: 16 January 2005 (aged 42–43); Jimma, Oromia Region, Ethiopia
- Notable work: The Alebeh Show
- Children: 3

Comedy career
- Medium: Television
- Genre: Standup comedy

Alebachew Teka (Amharic: አለባቸው ተካ; 1962 – 16 January 2005) was an Ethiopian comedian and television personality. He was known for his talk show The Alebeh Show.

== Biography ==
Alebachew was born in Wollo Province, in a small town called Wurgessa in 1962. He completed his elementary education at Wurgessa junior high school and moved to Addis Ababa for his high school education. Alebcahew loved comedy even from his elementary days. He was one of Ethiopia's best known contemporary and renowned comedians. He also hosted a talk show, The Alebeh Show, carried by state-owned Ethiopian Television (ETV). The weekly program, which was modeled similar to the American The Tonight Show, was a hit and brought him widespread fame across the country.

His career took off for his satirical TV shows, in which he often appeared along with his comedy partner Lemenih during the repressive regime of Mengistu Haile Mariam. Before starting his show, Alebachew Teka had lived in Israel.

In the documentary HIV/AIDS Awareness of the series Seeds of Hope: HIV/AIDS in Ethiopia, Alebachew and his wife at their wedding treated as honored guests many orphans who had lost their parents to AIDS.

Alebachew died on 16 January 2005, in a car accident while traveling from Addis Ababa to Jimma, a city some 124 miles west of the capital, to film a documentary for a new show. His car reportedly plunged into a ravine about 30 km from Jimma. He was 44 years old at the time of death.

News of his death was met with shock and more than 60,000 mourners attended Alebachew's funeral at St. Joseph's Church in the outskirt of Addis Ababa. He left a wife, two daughters and a son.
