= Habru =

District in Amhara Region, Ethiopia

Coordinates: 11°45′N 39°40′E

Habru ሀብሩ
- Woreda
- Flag
- Interactive map of Habru
- Zone: Semien Wollo
- Region: Amhara Region

Area
  - Total: 1,239.79 km^{2} (478.69 sq mi)

Population (2012 est.)
  - Total: 210,830
  - Density: 170.05/km^{2} (440.44/sq mi)

Habru (Amharic: ሀብሩ) is a woreda in the Amhara Region of Ethiopia. Part of the Semien Wollo Zone, Habru is bordered on the south by the Mille River which separates it from the Debub Wollo Zone, on the west by Guba Lafto, on the north by the Alewuha River which separates it from Kobo, and on the east by the Afar Region. Towns in Habru include Mersa and Wurgessa.

== Overview ==
The altitude of this woreda ranges from 700 meters above sea level where the Mille enters the Afar Region, to 1900 meters at its westernmost point. Habru, as well as the other seven rural woredas of this Zone, has been grouped amongst the 48 woredas identified as the most drought prone and food insecure in the Amhara Region. To combat increasing droughts and improve crop yields, five irrigation projects have been undertaken in this woreda by the Commission for Sustainable Agriculture and Environmental Rehabilitation in the Amhara Region and the NGO Lutheran World Federation, affecting 632 hectares and benefiting 2,709 households.

== Demographics ==
A 2012 estimate puts the population at 210,830. This gives a population density of 170.05 people per square kilometer (440.44 people per square mile), given its area of 1239.79 square kilometers (478.69 square miles), higher than the North Wollo Zone average of 134.66 people per square kilometer (348.76 people per square mile).

Based on the 2007 national census conducted by the Central Statistical Agency of Ethiopia (CSA), this woreda has a total population of 192,742, an increase of 14.61% over the 1994 census, of whom 96,874 are men and 95,868 women; 21,600 or 11.21% are urban inhabitants. With an area of 1,239.79 square kilometers, Habru has a population density of 155.46 people per square kilometer (402.64 people per square mile), which is greater than the Zone average of 123.25 people per square kilometer (319.22 people per square mile). A total of 48,109 households were counted in this woreda, resulting in an average of 4.01 persons to a household, and 46,247 housing units.

The 1994 national census reported a total population for this woreda of 168,172 in 37,741 households, of whom 83,389 were men and 84,783 were women; 12,772 or 7.59% of its population were urban dwellers.

The largest ethnic group reported in Habru was the Amhara (99.73%). Amharic was spoken as a first language by 99.78%. The majority of the population in 1994 were Muslim with 74.6% reported to practice that belief, while 25.3% of the population said they practiced Ethiopian Orthodox Christianity. In 2007 76.84% reported as Muslim and 22.95% as practicing Ethiopian Orthodox Christianity.
