= HIV/AIDS in Ethiopia =

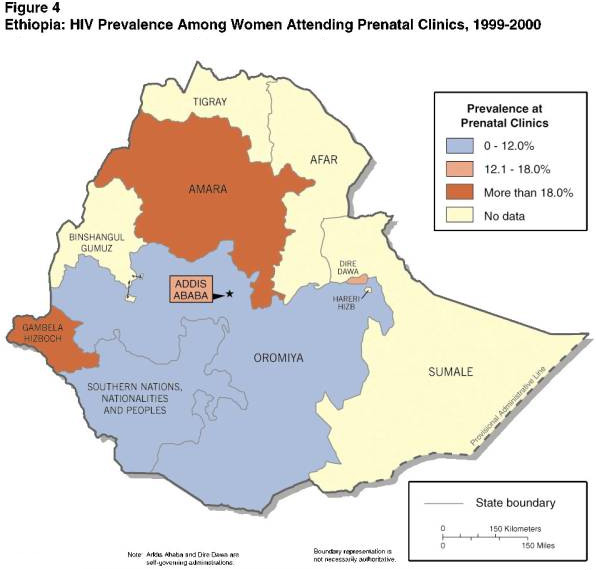
HIV/AIDS in Ethiopia

Ethiopia has a large and very vulnerable population, with an estimated 15 percent of the population living below the poverty line. HIV/AIDS is one of the key challenges for the overall development of Ethiopia, as it has led to a seven-year decrease in life expectancy and a greatly reduced workforce.

Ethiopia faces an epidemic among sub-populations and geographic areas, with an estimated overall HIV prevalence rate of 1.4 percent, based on testing a sample of 5,780 men and 5,300 women age 15 to 49 who gave informed consent. The reality in the actual population turns above 3.3%. Within the individual regions, this testing found the prevailing rate varied from 0.2 in the SNNPR to a high of 6.0 percent in the Gambela Region. While previous estimations were higher, expansion of surveillance data and improved analyses resulted in significantly lower estimations for 2005. Based on the same survey, HIV prevalence has declined to about 3.2% from 4.7% percent in urban areas.3.3 % of Ethiopia population have affected by HIV in 2006.

== Risk of infection ==
The primary mode of HIV transmission in Ethiopia is heterosexual contact. Young women are more vulnerable to infection than young men; urban women are three times as likely to be infected as urban men, although in rural areas the difference between genders is negligible. Populations at higher risk for HIV infection include sex workers, police officers and members of the military.

== Other problems ==
Reduced productivity, civil conflict, poor farming conditions, and recurrent droughts leave 10,000 to 150,000 people at risk of starvation each year. In the health sector, there is a shortage of health workers and counselors, in addition to poor access to sparse health services, inadequate sanitation, inefficient procurement systems, and weak monitoring and evaluation systems. Conflict, famine and drought have led to widespread population movements, adding to displacements caused by cross-border tensions. As of January 2009, there were an estimated 97,300 refugees in Ethiopia.

== Treatment ==
A program is being developed to distribute generic drugs donated by various aid groups to women of childbearing years.

== See also ==
- HIV/AIDS in Africa
- Seeds of Hope: HIV/AIDS in Ethiopia (film)
