= Delanta =

Coordinates: 11.5932°N 39.2125°E

Delanta ደላንታ
- Woreda
- Flag
- Interactive map of Delanta
- Zone: Debub Wollo
- Region: Amhara Region

Area
  - Total: 1,056.95 km^{2} (408.09 sq mi)

Population (2012 est.)
  - Total: 138,779
  - Density: 131.301/km^{2} (340.069/sq mi)

Delanta (Amharic ደላንታ) is one of the woredas in the Amhara Region of Ethiopia. Part of the South Wollo Zone, Delanta is bordered on the south by the Bashilo River which separates it from the Debub Wollo Zone, on the west by the Dawunt, on the northwest by Wadla, and on the northeast and east by Guba Lafto. The major town is Wegeltena, which is 98 kilometers away from the zonal capital Dessie and 499 kilometers from the nation's capital Addis Ababa.

The woreda of Delanta was part of the former Dawuntna Delant woreda.

== Geography ==
Dälanta is situated in the northwest part of Wällo with an altitude ranges between 1700 meter above sea level in river valleys and 3500 meter above sea level at mountains. As traveler Markham briefly explains what he observed during his journey in the year 1868, Dӓlanta is a flat plain, quite treeless, except the clumps around a few churches, and with a rich black soil several inches thick, save where the streams have worn it away and laid bare the pentagon-shaped tops of the basalt columns. From most points of view the scarped side of the Dawənt plateau and of the Žəṭṭa and Bashilo ravines is just visible of the edges of the plain.

The eastern part has been described as “a mass of columnar basalt between the Žəṭṭa and Bäšlo rivers, with its surface upwards of 9000 feet above the level of the sea. It is surrounded by the headwater tributaries of the Blue Nile such as Bashilo River in the south and Žəṭṭa River, which separates the Wadla plateau from that of Dälanta, in the north. None of the rivers are used for irrigation. This is because Dälanta is characterized by a land form of extensive plateaus, chains of hills with mountainous ridge, oval shape with dendritic drainage pattern, numerous hills at the plain area, river valleys and very deep gorges at the boundary. Dälanta plateau is surrounded by deep river valleys with very steep slopes in most parts.

About two-third of the wäräda embracing altitudes range between 2100 and 3500 meter above sea level are highly populated. The remaining one-third of the area is located along the river valleys on the east, southeast, north and northwest escarpments. The topography of the highland plateaus mainly elevated above 3000m which dominated by hills. The wäräda was classified as mountainous consisted of 30%, plains 30%, 36.5% gorges and 3.5% other land features.

The differences in temperature mainly between Dälanta plateau and its neighboring mainly Wadla is very observable, the former being warmer. This may probably be accounted for by the deep warm ravines of the Žəṭṭa and Bäšlo, which border Dälanta on either side, while the Wadla plateau only has the Žəṭṭa ravine on the one side.

As the regions topography is varied, so its climate ranging from extremely cold/däga through temperate/wäyna däga to hot lowland/qolla areas ranging from an elevation of 1700 to 3600 meter above sea level. When considered in terms of agro-climatic zones, that are basically correlated with elevation, the wäräda falls under lowlands (qolla) good for țef, goats and vegetables; midlands (wäyna däga) good for wheat and oats; and highlands (däga) good for barley and sheep. Its climate is characterized by dry seasons i.e. October to February Cold-Dry and March to June Hot-Dry and wet season from mid-June to September. The däga climate is made up of 26.4% or 25,872.53 hectares, wäyna däga covers 43.8% or 42,924 hectares and the qolla zone consisted of 29.8% or 29,204.59 hectares. From this the wäyna däga climatic zone covers the largest area in the wäräda.

Areas which are extremely cold in the däga region are called “wurč” such as Angot, Ṩäḥay Mäwuča, and Ṭardat are found in this zone and in each year of the mäḵär season mainly in every October and November, experience crop failure due to extreme cold climate. The peasants in these areas depend on “Bälg” rain which occurs between Mägabit (March) and Miyaziya (April). The cereal crops in the däga grow barley, wheat, oats, peas, horse beans, and lentils and the staple food is barley and horse beans. The only crop they cultivate during the minor rainy season is barley because it is cold resistant crop.

The Wäyna Däga zone is part of the region which is neither very cold nor very hot. It comprises altitudes between 2400 and 3000 meters above sea level. Areas such as Yəlana Bätačə, Mähal Dälanta, Zəban Däga, and Čäwu Quțər are fall under this zone. People living in this zone rely on both Bälg and Mäḵär seasons and they cultivate crops such as Teff (Eragrostis tef), beans, peas, lentils and Gʷaya (Lathyrus sativus) and Abəš (Trigonella foenum-graecum). The Qolla zones have elevations below 2400 meters above sea level. Areas like Zəban Qolla, Asim Qolla, Ḫʷayt Mäsəqäl, Gošə Meda, Biwät Sələho, Wusțamba Tämbäko, Qəsat Qolla, Sälit Dəma, Țəqəšəñ and Țima. The people cultivated crops during the Säne - Häməle Mäḵär period such as sorghum. In the small däga regions of Dälanta, ṭid (Podocarpus), olive, acacia, etc. trees are found while in the rest of the region as a whole the natural vegetation consists of thorn bushes, acacia and fig.

== Demographics ==
A 2012 estimate puts the population at 138,779. This gives a population density of 131.30 people per square kilometer (340.07 people per square mile), given its area of 1,056.95 square kilometers (408.09 square miles), lower than the South Wollo Zone average of 161.49 people per square kilometer (418.56 people per square mile).

Based on the 2007 national census conducted by the Central Statistical Agency of Ethiopia (CSA), this woreda has a total population of 127,771, of whom 63,747 are men and 64,024 women; 7,850 or 6.14% are urban inhabitants. The majority of the inhabitants practiced Ethiopian Orthodox Christianity, with 90.78% reporting that as their religion, while 9.21% of the population said they were Muslim.
