= Gidan =

District in Amhara Region, Ethiopia

Coordinates: 12°15′N 39°10′E

Gidan ጊዳን
- Woreda
- Flag
- Interactive map of Gidan
- Zone: Semien Wollo
- Region: Amhara Region

Area
  - Total: 1,089.80 km^{2} (420.77 sq mi)

Population (2012 est.)
  - Total: 171,772
  - Density: 157.62/km^{2} (408.23/sq mi)

Gidan (Amharic: ጊዳን) is a woreda in the Amhara Region of Ethiopia. Part of the Semien Wollo Zone, Gidan is bordered on the south by Guba Lafto, on the southwest by Meket, on the west by Lasta (formerly part of Bugna), on the north by the Tigray Region, and on the east by Kobo. The administrative center of the woreda is Muja town, another small towns in Gidan include Debre Tsehay, Densa, Bekilo Mneqia, Iyella, Dildiy, Asikit, and Wonday.

== Overview ==
The topography of this woreda is characterized by numerous escarpments and generally steep hill slopes; however every hill slope, no matter how steep, is used for cultivation. The altitude of this woreda ranges from 1300 to over 4100 meters above sea level; the highest point in Gidan is Mount Abuna Yosef, on the border with Lasta woreda (formerly part of Bugna woreda). Rivers include the Tellare, a tributary of the Tekezé, along which Lieutenant-General Napier's men marched in 1868, after leaving the Dafat Pass.

Gidan, as well as the other seven rural woredas of this Zone, has been grouped amongst the 48 woredas identified as the most drought prone and food insecure in the Amhara Region. Almost no trees can be seen in this barren landscape. Deep erosion gullies and the gravel, stone and rock covered valley bottoms attest to extensive land degradation. An inspection in 1999 by members of the UNDP-EUE concluded that these slopes and escarpment areas were being used too intensively and in a highly unsustainable way.

== Demographics ==
A 2012 estimate puts the population at 171,772. This gives a population density of 157.62 people per square kilometer (408.23 people per square mile), given its area of 1089.80 square kilometers (420.77 square miles), higher than the North Wollo Zone average of 134.66 people per square kilometer (348.76 people per square mile).

Based on the 2007 national census conducted by the Central Statistical Agency of Ethiopia (CSA), this woreda has a total population of 158,428, an increase of 16.66% over the 1994 census, of whom 78,309 are men and 80,119 women; 7,720 or 4.87% are urban inhabitants. With an area of 1,089.80 square kilometers, Gidan has a population density of 145.37, which is greater than the Zone average of 123.25 persons per square kilometer. A total of 37,386 households were counted in this woreda, resulting in an average of 4.24 persons to a household, and 36,342 housing units.

The 1994 national census reported a total population for this woreda of 135,805 in 33,380 households, of whom 67,560 were men and 68,245 were women; 4,127 or 3.04% of its population were urban dwellers.

The largest ethnic group reported in Gidan was the Amhara (99.96%), and Amharic was spoken as a first language by 99.97%. In 1994 99.63% of the population practiced Ethiopian Orthodox Christianity. This was nearly identical in 2007, at 99.61%.
