= Guba Lafto =

Coordinates: 12°00′N 39°20′E

Guba Lafto ጉባ ላፍቶ
- Woreda
- Flag
- Interactive map of Guba Lafto
- Zone: Semien Wollo
- Region: Amhara Region

Area
  - Total: 900.49 km^{2} (347.68 sq mi)

Population (2012 est.)
  - Total: 151,308
  - Density: 168.03/km^{2} (435.19/sq mi)

Guba Lafto (Amharic: ጉባ ላፍቶ) is one of the woredas in the Amhara Region of Ethiopia. Part of the Semien Wollo Zone, Guba Lafto is bordered on the south by the Debub Wollo Zone, on the west by Delanta and Wadla, on the northwest by Meket, on the north by Gidan, on the northeast by the Logiya River which separates it from Kobo, and on the southeast by Habru. Weldiya is an enclave inside this woreda. Towns in this woreda include Hara.

== Overview ==
Guba Lafto, as well as the other seven rural woredas of this Zone, has been grouped amongst the 48 woredas identified as the most drought prone and food insecure in the Amhara Region. To combat increasing droughts and improve crop yields, two irrigation projects have been undertaken in this woreda by the Commission for Sustainable Agriculture and Environmental Rehabilitation in the Amhara Region and the NGO Lutheran World Federation, affecting 560 hectares and benefiting 2,489 households.

Guba Lafto has a mountainous landscape, with its ranging from 1300 to 3900 meters above sea level. Soil erosion is marked by ever-expanding gullies. Increasing population has led to shrinking farm and grazing areas. Declining soil fertility, increased incidence of crop pests and weeds, along with cultural attitudes have made Guba Lafto as one of the food insecure woredas of the Amhara Region. To help combat this, the AMAREW project helped inhabitants of kebeles located in the Lenche Dima watershed to create micro-enterprises to manufacture gabion wire boxes. Produced at a third of the cost they can be purchased at Debre Tabor, these gabions are used to fight gully formation.

== Demographics ==
A 2012 estimate puts the population at 151,308. This gives a population density of 168.03 people per square kilometer (435,19 people per square mile), given its area of 900.49 square kilometers (347.68 square miles), higher than the North Wollo Zone average of 134.66 people per square kilometer (348.76 people per square mile).

Based on the 2007 national census conducted by the Central Statistical Agency of Ethiopia (CSA), this woreda has a total population of 139,825, an increase of 0.48% over the 1994 census, of whom 70,750 are men and 69,075 women; 4,886 or 3.49% are urban inhabitants. With an area of 900.49 square kilometers, Guba Lafto has a population density of 155.28 people per square kilometer (402.17 people per square mile), which is greater than the Zone average of 123.25 people per square kilometer (319.22 people per square mile). A total of 33,676 households were counted in this woreda, resulting in an average of 4.15 persons to a household, and 32,824 housing units.

The 1994 national census reported a total population for this woreda of 139,151 in 34,716 households, of whom 69,975 were men and 69,176 were women; none of its population were reported to be urban dwellers.

The largest ethnic group reported in Guba Lafto was the Amhara (99.92%). Amharic was spoken as a first language by 99.94%. 88.55% of the population practiced Ethiopian Orthodox Christianity, and 11.42% of the population said they were Muslim. By 2007 86.58% reported Ethiopian Orthodox Christianity as their religion, while 13.32% of the population said they were Muslim.
