= Health in Ethiopia =

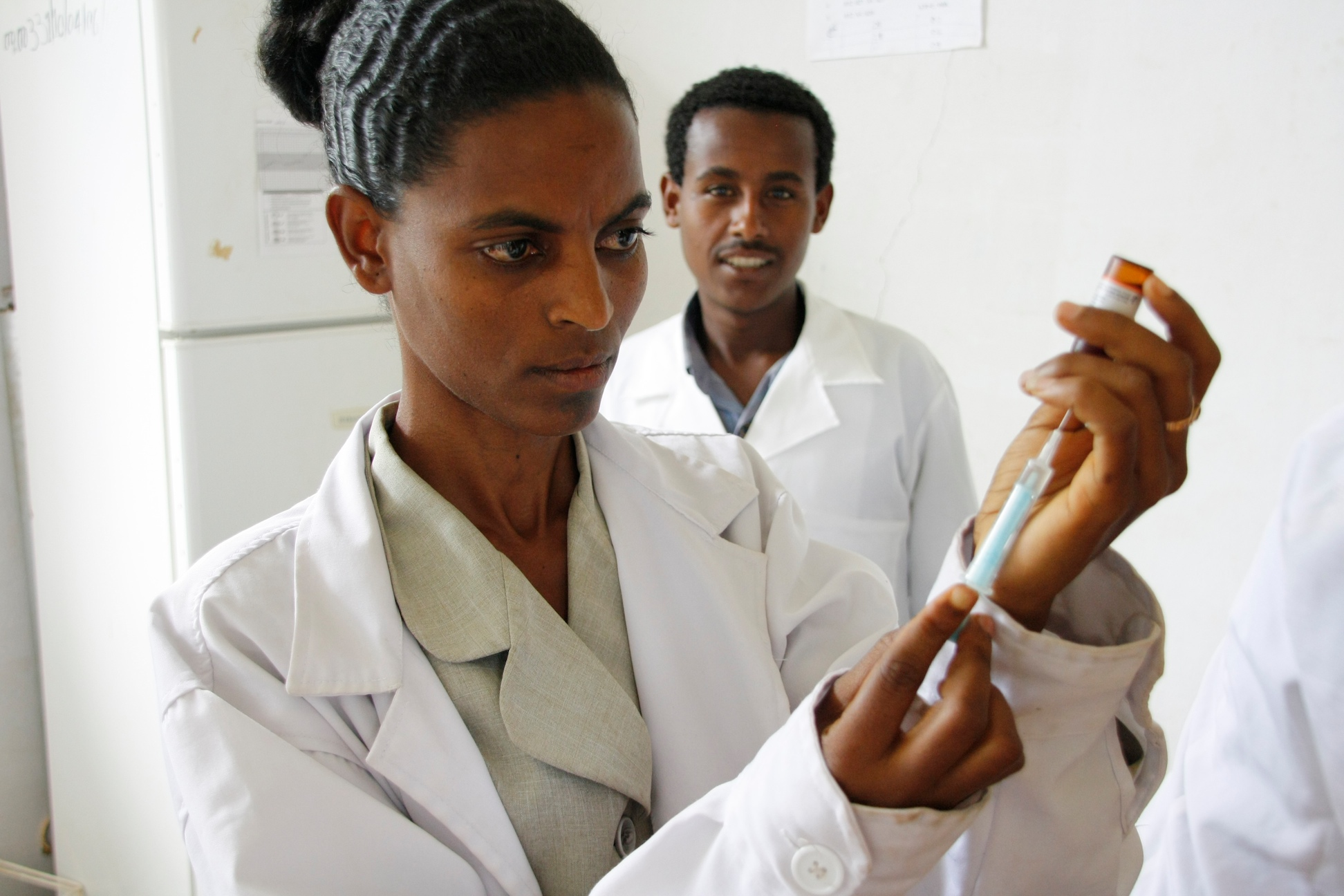
Preparing a measles vaccine in Ethiopia

Life expectancy at birth in Ethiopia

Health in Ethiopia has improved markedly since the early 2000s, with government leadership playing a key role in mobilizing resources and ensuring that they are used effectively. A central feature of the sector is the priority given to the Health Extension Programme, which delivers cost-effective basic services that enhance equity and provide care to millions of women, men and children. The development and delivery of the Health Extension Program, and its lasting success, is an example of how a low-income country can still improve access to health services with creativity and dedication.

The Human Rights Measurement Initiative finds that Ethiopia is fulfilling 83.3% of what it should be fulfilling for the right to health based on its level of income. When looking at the right to health with respect to children, Ethiopia achieves 94.5% of what is expected based on its current income. In regards to the right to health amongst the adult population, the country achieves only 90.6% of what is expected based on the nation's level of income. Ethiopia falls into the "very bad" category when evaluating the right to reproductive health because the nation is fulfilling only 64.8% of what the nation is expected to achieve based on the resources (income) it has available.

== Overview ==
Ethiopia is the second most populous country in sub-Saharan Africa, with a population of over 120 million people. As of the end of 2003, the United Nations (UN) reported that 4.4% of adults were infected with human immunodeficiency virus/acquired immune deficiency syndrome (HIV/AIDS); other estimates of the rate of infection ranged from a low of 7% to a high of 18%. Whatever the actual rate, the prevalence of HIV/AIDS contributed to falling life expectancy since the early 1990s. According to the Ministry of Health Ethiopia, one-third of current young adult deaths are AIDS-related. Malnutrition is widespread, especially among children, as is food insecurity. Because of growing population pressure on agricultural and pastoral land, soil degradation, and severe droughts that have occurred each decade since the 1970s, per capita food production is declining. According to the UN and the World Bank, Ethiopia in 2005 suffered from a structural food deficit such that even in the most productive years, at least 5 million Ethiopians require food relief.

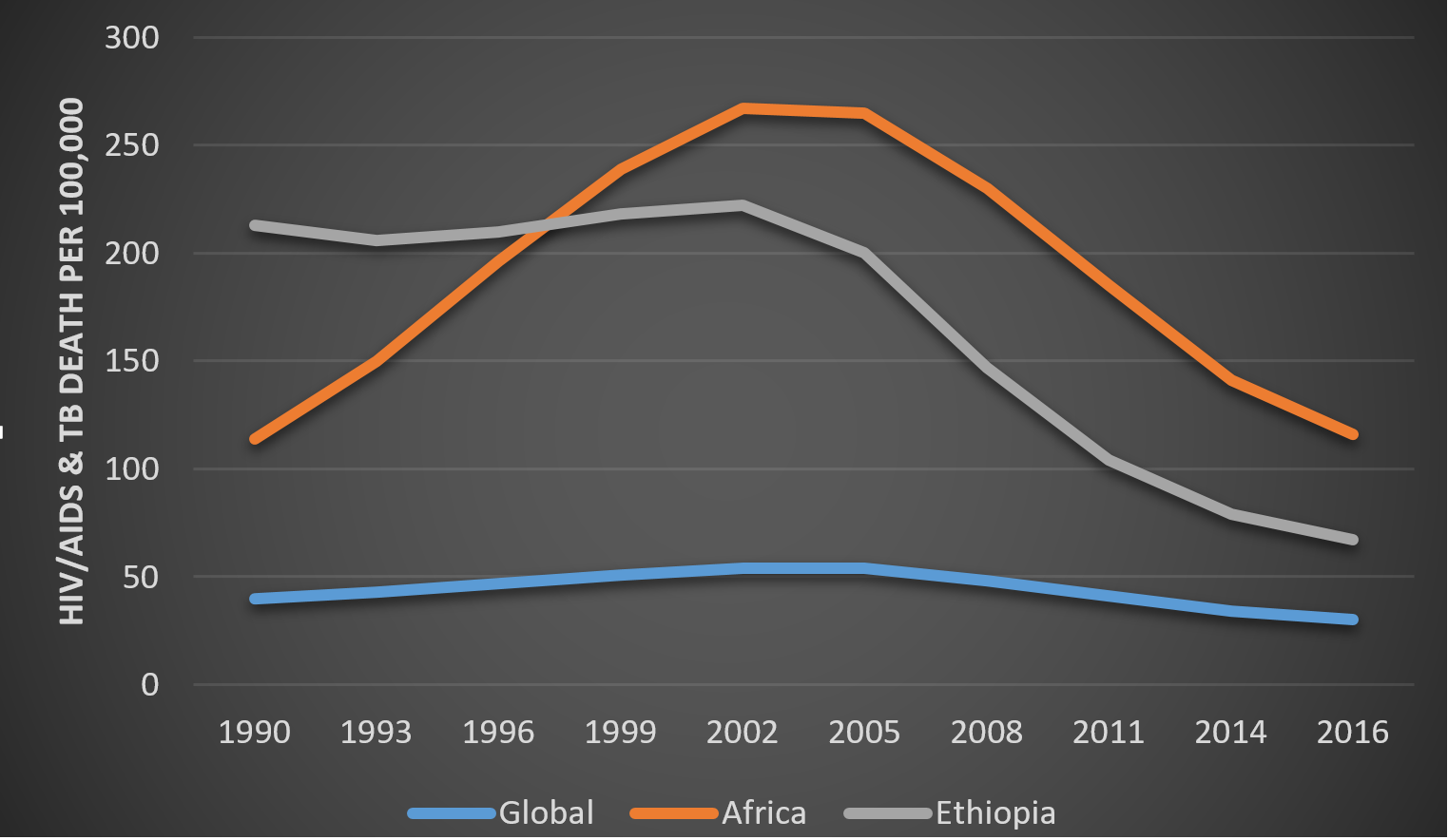
Line Graph showing the trend of mortality from HIV and TB in Ethiopia, Africa and the Globe

The fact that the country achieved MDG 4, reducing the child mortality and the decline of HIV mortality has helped life expectancy to increase to 65.2 years in 2015 from 46.6 years in 1990. The under 5 mortality rate and infant mortality rate dropped from 203 and 122 in 1990 to 61.3 and 41.4 in 2015. The ministry of health has achieved this through the Health Extension Program by using a special implementation platform called Women Development Army.

Ethiopia experiences a triple burden of disease mainly attributed to communicable infectious diseases and nutritional deficiencies, NCD and traffic accident. Shortage and high turnover of human resource and inadequacy of essential drugs and supplies have also contributed to the burden. However, there has been encouraging improvements in the coverage and utilization of the health service over the periods of implementation of Health Sector Development Plan, the health chapter of the national poverty reduction strategy, which aims to increase immunization coverage and decrease under-five mortality at large. The health service currently reaches about 72% of the population and The Federal Ministry of Health aims to reach 85% of the population by 2009 through the Health Extension Program (HEP) [1]. The HEP is designed to deliver health promotion, immunization and other disease prevention measures along with a limited number of high-impact curative interventions.

== Life expectancy ==
Table 1: Ethiopia's Health Status trend from 1980 to 2015
Health Indicator	1950	1960	1970	1980	1990	2000	2015
U5MR	329	275	243	240	203	144	61.3
IMR	-	162	143	143	122	89.5	41.4
Life Expectancy (Yr)	33.8	39	43.7	44.6	46.6	51/1	65.2

A new measure of expected human capital calculated for 195 countries from 1990 to 2016 and defined for each birth cohort as the expected years lived from age 20 to 64 years and adjusted for educational attainment, learning or education quality, and functional health status was published by The Lancet in September 2018. Ethiopia had the lowest level of expected human capital among the 20 largest countries with less than 5 health, education, and learning-adjusted expected years lived between age 20 and 64 years. This put it in 175th place, an improvement over its position in 1990 when it was 189th.

Life expectancy is better in cities compared to rural areas, but there have been significant improvements witnessed throughout the country as of 2016, the average Ethiopian living to be 62.2 years old, according to a UNDP report.

== Disease ==
=== Cardiovascular disease ===
The International Diabetes Federation (IDF) estimates diabetes prevalence among adults at 3.39% in Ethiopia. A study in Addis Ababa has reported diabetes prevalence rates of 6.5% and in a recent survey from Gondar the prevalence of diabetes mellitus among adults aged 35 years and above was 5.1% for urban and 2.1% for rural dwellers. Hypertension is also increasing at frightening rates with prevalence rates of 19 to 30% reported in Addis Ababa, 28% in Gondar and 13% in Jimma.

=== HIV/AIDS ===
HIV/AIDS in Ethiopia stood at 1.1% in 2014, a dramatic decrease from 4.5% 15 years ago. The most affected are poor communities and women, due to lack of health education, empowerment, awareness and lack of social well-being. The government of Ethiopia and many international organizations like World Health Organization (WHO), and the United Nations, are launching campaigns and are working aggressively to improve Ethiopia's health conditions and promote health awareness on AIDS and other communicable diseases.

=== Malaria ===
Though its prevalence in Ethiopia is relatively low compared to other African nations, malaria remains the leading cause of outpatient morbidity and is among the leading causes of inpatient morbidity. Nearly 60 percent of the population lives in areas at risk of malaria, generally at elevations below 2,000 meters above sea level. Recently, many densely populated highland areas, including the city of Addis Ababa, were classified as malaria-free. Because peak transmission coincides with the planting and harvesting season, malaria places a heavy economic burden on the country. Sixty percent of malaria infections are due to the Plasmodium falciparum parasite, though the Plasmodium vivax parasite is also present. Insecticide resistance among vectors and antimalarial drug resistance have been documented in the country.

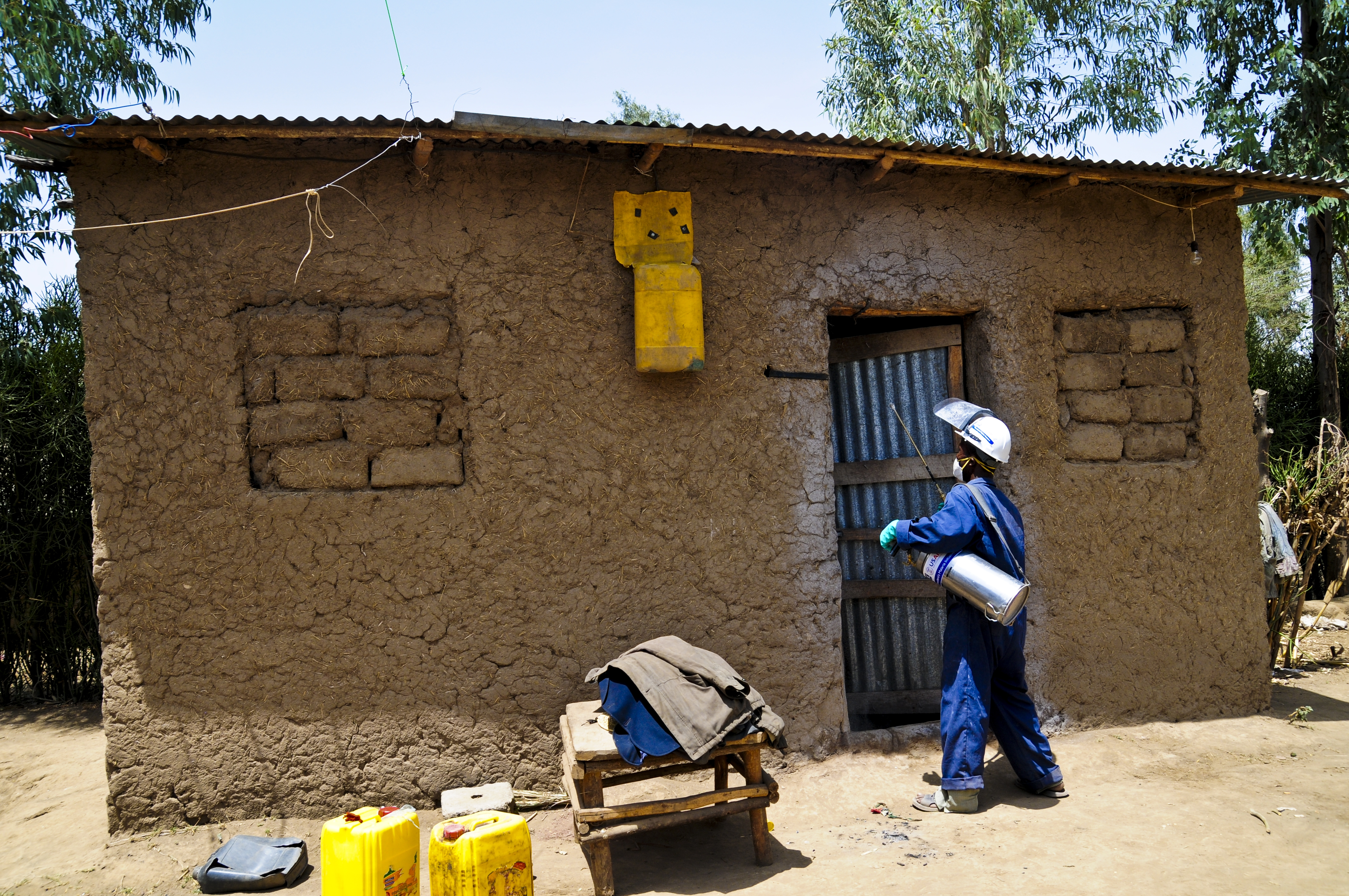
USAID using anti-malarial spray to prevent mosquitoes from entering a home in Oromia, Ethiopia.

The Carter Center conducted research in Ethiopia in the mid-2000s where they analyzed how malaria affects the Ethiopian population among various factors. The factors considered included living situations and housing conditions, as well as Ethiopian age and gender demographics. This study found that one's socio-economic position directly correlates to their chance of contracting malaria. Researchers concluded that a key method of reducing the prevalence of malaria in Ethiopia is by improving the quality of housing and living conditions. They found an effective disease countermeasure to be the use of anti-malarial spray, as households that had been sprayed had lower rates of infection. This research also concluded that while the poorest households are more likely to face these poor conditions, they are also the ones less likely to take steps towards malaria prevention, thus continuing transmission of the disease.

The Carter Center chose three specific areas in Ethiopia to assess the impact of the use of insecticide treated mosquito nets on malaria prevalence. During the course of the study, malaria prevalence fell to 0.4% from a starting 4.1%. This study concluded sleeping under these mosquito nets is an effective tactic for mitigating malaria in regions of concern. This study has revealed the importance and effectiveness of malaria prevention in Ethiopia, and thus has led to health workers promoting the use of these long lasting insecticidal nets in areas where use is still limited and disease prevalence is highest.

A research study done by the Ethiopian Public Health Institute revealed flaws with Ethiopia's laboratories and their workers as it pertains to malaria diagnosis. The study found 26.7% of the 106 Ethiopian laboratories assessed lacked adequate supplies needed for proper diagnosis. Researchers attributed this to multiple factors, such as insufficient lab funding and supporting third parties not providing supplies in a timely manner. The study also noted a lack of job competency in the microscopists who look for malaria in blood cells in these labs. The Ethiopian Public Health Institute found that, in conjunction with the Ministry of Health and local health providers, they should be working to better educate, supply and monitor these labs and their workers in order to prevent further obstacles in malaria mitigation in Ethiopia.

Although much of Ethiopia remains at risk of malaria, routine surveillance data from the last decade have noted declines in malaria outpatient morbidity and inpatient mortality trends. Prompt access to malaria case management, including laboratory-based diagnosis in remote rural areas, has improved dramatically over the last decade together with surveillance systems that capture malaria morbidity and mortality.

=== Neglected tropical diseases ===
Neglected tropical diseases (NTDs) are group of chronic parasitic tropical diseases of the bottom billion peoples living under US$2/day. Ethiopia is the third following Nigeria and Democratic Congo, having the greatest burden of NTDs as public health problem. In Ethiopia most of the NTDs listed by WHO are present; having trachoma, podoconiosis and cutaneous leishmaniasis being the highest burden in Sub-Saharan Africa followed by second highest burden of ascariasis, leprosy and visceral leishmaniasis and the third highest burden of hookworm. Other infections like schistosomiasis, trichuriasis, rabies and lymphatic filariasis are also common problems in Ethiopia.

=== Non-communicable disease ===
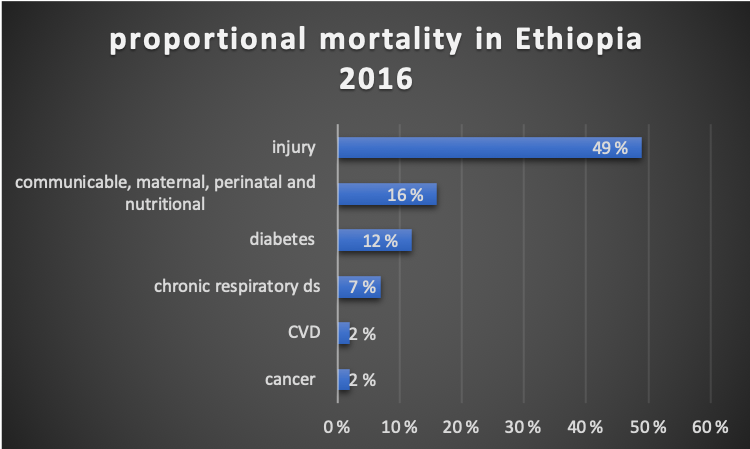
proportionate mortality in Ethiopia, 2016

Due to major life stay change and urbanisation, in the recent two decades in Ethiopia there is significant epidemiological change. Having the problem of the communicable disease as the major burden, the country is suffering from triple burden of equally significant non-communicable disease burden and emerging Injury problems.

The Global Burden of Disease Study (GBD) 2016 shows that 52% of the mortality and 46% of total disease burden (as measured by disability-adjusted life years) were attributable to NCDs and injuries in Ethiopia. The 2015/16 National STEPS Survey on NCDs and risk factors showed the prevalence of hypertension and diabetes is 15.6% and 3.2% respectively among the adult population. More than 95% of adults have more than one risk factor for NCDs among the selected 5 major risk factors identified in the survey, namely current daily smoking, BMI ≥ 25 kg/m2, low consumption of fruits and vegetables, physical inactivity and raised blood pressure. The prevalence of alcohol and Khat consumption is very high (41% & 16% respectively), and average daily salt intake of the population is 8.3 g which is much higher than the WHO recommended intake of less than 5 grams per day.

=== TB and leprosy ===
Tuberculosis has been identified as one of the major public health problems in Ethiopia for the past five decades. The effort to control tuberculosis began in the early 60s with the establishment of TB centers and sanatoria in three major urban areas in the country. The Central Office (CO) of the National Tuberculosis Control Program (NTCP) was established in 1976. From the very beginning the CO had serious problems in securing sufficient budget and skilled human resource. In 1992, a well-organized TB program incorporating standardized directly observed short course treatment (DOTS) was implemented in a few pilot areas of the country.

An organized leprosy control program was established within the Ministry of Health in 1956, with a detailed policy in 1969. In the following decades, leprosy control was strongly supported by the All African Leprosy and Rehabilitation Training Institute (ALERT) and the German Leprosy Relief Association (GLRA). This vertical program was well funded and has scored notable achievements in reducing the prevalence of leprosy, especially after the introduction of Multiple Drug Therapy (MDT) in 1983. This has encouraged Ethiopia to consider integration of the vertical leprosy control program with in the general health services. The two programs were merged to being the National Tuberculosis and Leprosy Control program (NTLCP), and coordinated under the technical leadership of the CO from 1994.

The most recent WHO global report classifies Ethiopia as one of the top 30 high burden countries for TB, TB/HIV and MDR-TB. The TB prevalence estimates in Ethiopia shows a steady decline since 1995 with an average rate of 4% per year, which is accentuated in the last five years (annual decline of 5.4%). Likewise, the estimates for TB incidence reached a peak value of 431/100,000 population in 1997, and has been declining at an average rate of 3.9% per year since 1998, with annual decline of 6% within the last five years. The incidence estimate for all forms of TB in 2015 is 192/100,000 population. TB mortality rate has also been declining steadily since 1990 and reached 26/100,000 population in 2015. The decline in prevalence rate for all forms of TB has declined from 426/100,100 in 1990 to 200/100,000 population in 2014 (53% reduction). Similarly, the TB incidence rate has dropped from 369 in 1990 to 192/100,000 population in 2015 (48% reduction), after a peak of 421/100,000 in 2000. Furthermore, TB related mortality rate has been declining steadily over the last decade from 89/100,000 in 1990 to 26/100,000 in 2015 (70% reduction from 1990 level).

In 2011, the first population based national survey shows a prevalence rate of 108/100,000 population smear positive TB among adults, and 277/100,000 population bacteriologically confirmed TB cases. The prevalence of TB for all groups in Ethiopia was 240/100,000 populations in the same year. This finding indicates that the actual TB prevalence and incidence rates in Ethiopia are lower than the WHO estimates. Additionally, the survey showed a higher prevalence rates for smear positive and bacteriologically confirmed TB in pastoralist communities. However, pertaining to its methodology, the survey did not produce further disaggregated sub-national estimates.

== Maternal and child health ==
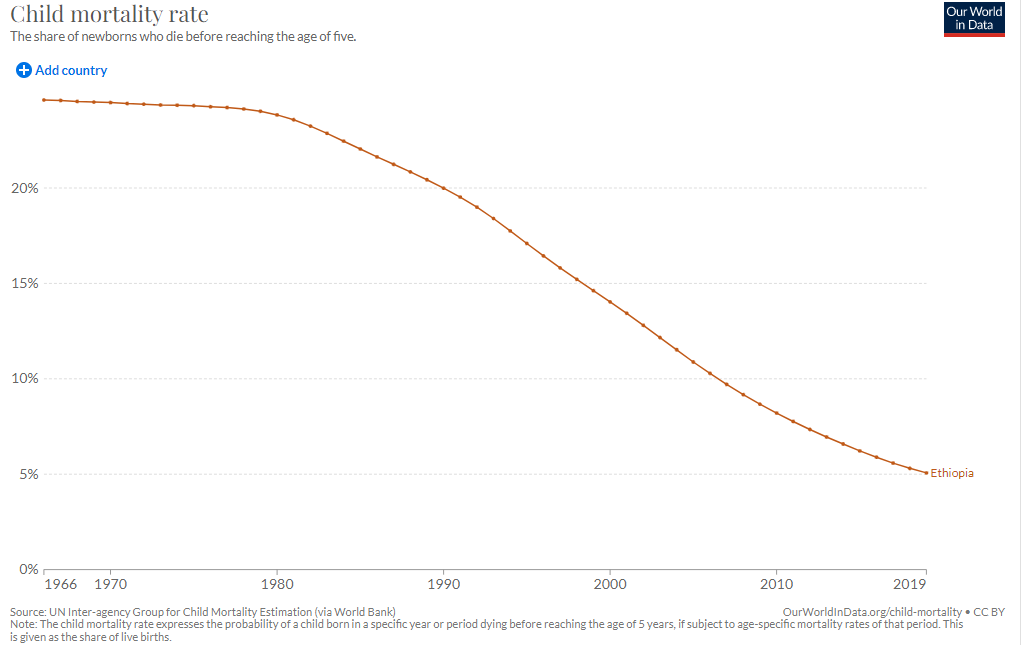
Development of child mortality rate in Ethiopia since 1966

Only a minority of Ethiopians are born in hospitals, while most are born in rural households. Those who are expected to give birth at home have elderly women serve as midwives who assist with the delivery.

=== Maternal health ===
Maternal and child health program is a priority agenda of the government of Ethiopia and this has been clearly indicated on the currently being implemented strategic plan of the Ministry of Health. Though Maternal and child health program is still one of the target area which needs much organized, systematic and focused effort, clear progress has been witnessed over years as per the Demographic health survey report of the country. The 2016 DHS shows these steady changes. Other recent studies show notable variation across the country as well as progress at both the national and subnational level. Ethiopia has seen a 67% decrease in child mortality and a 71% decrease in maternal mortality over the last two and a half decades.

Maternal health status could be assessed with many indicators of which Modern contraceptive use, skilled delivery and maternal mortality are some of the majors. Modern contraceptive use by currently married Ethiopian women has increased over 15 years prior to the 2016 DHS, jumping from 6% in 2000 to 27% and 35% in 2011 and 2016 respectively. The skilled delivery has increased from 10% in 2011 to 27.7% in 2016. The total fertility is declining but the changes are not that significant. The pregnancy related mortality has also dropped over the last three surveys and this could be attributed to the improvement on skilled delivery and family planning. The maternal mortality (if it could be used interchangeably with pregnancy related disease (with all the limitations)) is more than double the SDG target set for maternal mortality reduction (70/100,000 live birth)

Nowadays children are getting vaccinated better compared to the past two decades. The fact that Ethiopia is on the verge of eradicating polio could be a good evidence for that. The percentage of age 12 – 23 months who are fully vaccinated increased by 15% from 24% in 2011 to 39% in 2016. Childhood mortality has declined substantially since 2000. However, the change in neonatal mortality is not significant compared to post neonatal and child mortality. Reducing child mortality (MDG 3) has been achieved previously and if the effort is maintained the 2030 target of decreasing the under-five mortality to 25 could be met by the end of the target.

The "WHO estimates that a majority of maternal fatalities and disabilities could be prevented if deliveries were to take place at well-equipped health centres, with adequately trained staff".

=== Infant mortality ===
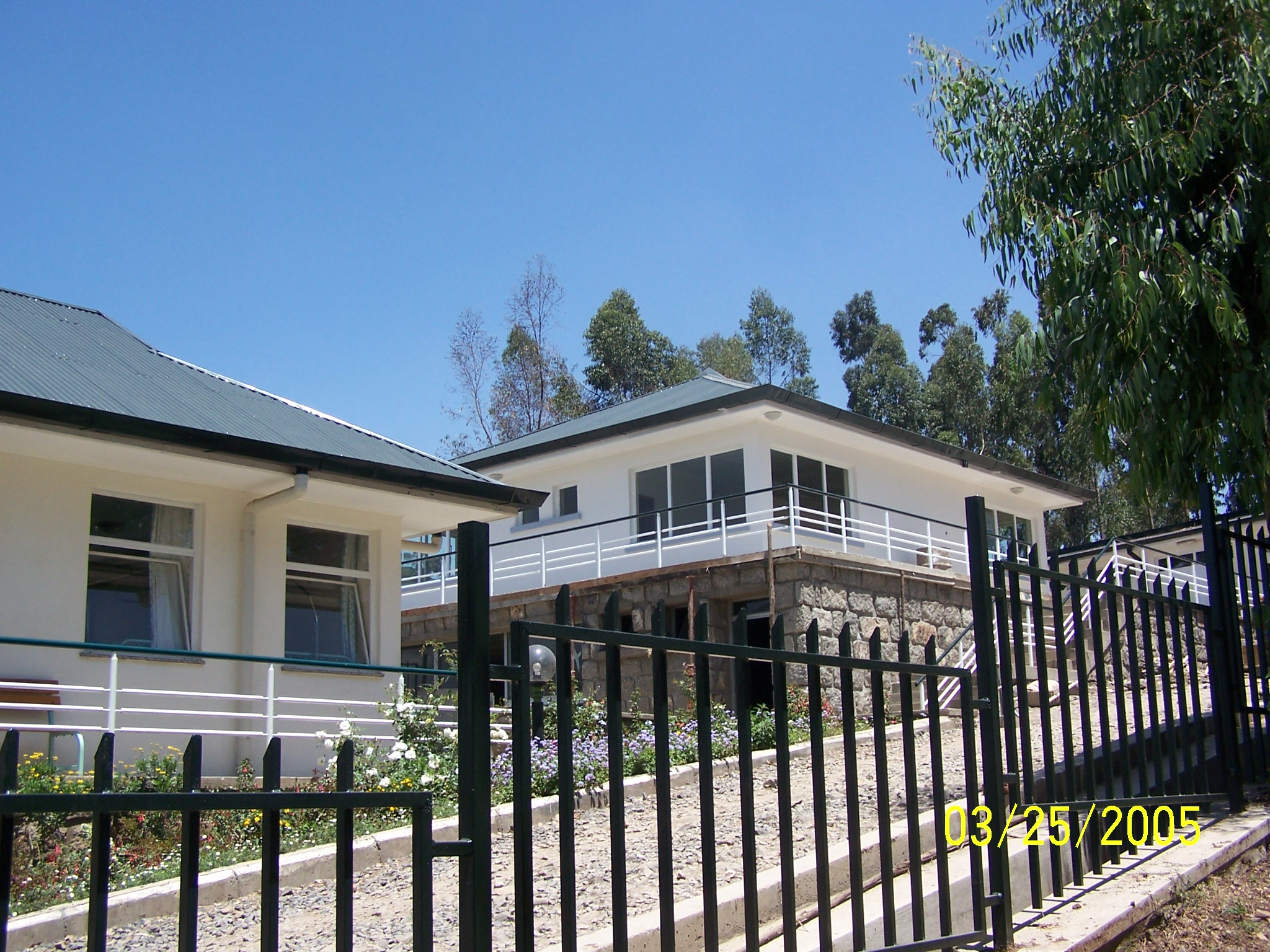
Addis Ababa Fistula Hospital

In early 2005, the WHO reported that Ethiopia had 119 hospitals (12 in Addis Ababa) and 412 health centres. Infant mortality rates are relatively high, as 41 infants die per 1,000 live births. Ethiopia succeeded in reducing its under-five mortality rate by two-thirds (one of the Millennium Development Goals) between 1990 and 2012. Although this is a dramatic decrease, birth-related complications such as obstetric fistula affect many of the nation's women.

Birth rates, infant mortality rates, and death rates are lower in cities than in rural areas due to better access to education, medicines, and hospitals.

== Injury ==
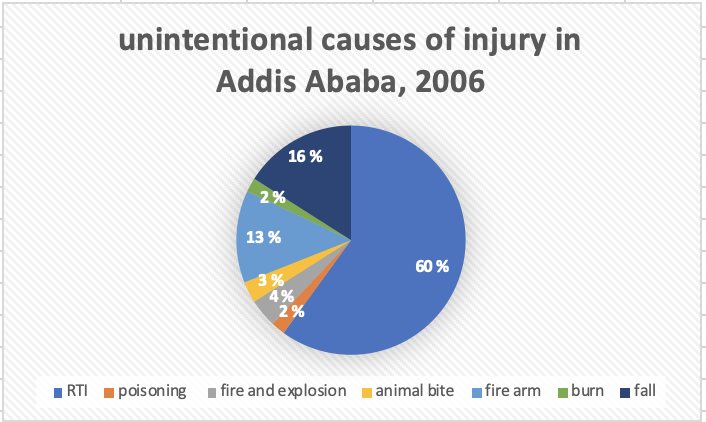
Unintentional injury in Addis Ababa, Ethiopia 2006

In Ethiopia, injury is significantly increasing partly due to urbanisation & motorisation and mainly due to poor safety measures such as road safety. Despite the alarmingly increasing of the public burden, the attention given to the problem is very minimal. Unintended injury is the commonest injury accounting for 60% of all injury. Road traffic injury is the leading cause of unintentional injury (39% of all injury) followed by fall (16%), machine injury (5.9%), burn (5.3%), animal bite (1.3%) and poising (1%). Trauma from interpersonal violence or homicide is the leading cause of intentional injury accounting for 24.4% all injury followed by firearm 5% and self-harm injuries of 2.1%. In Ethiopia, the burden of road traffic accident is disproportionally high compared to the rest of the world having road traffic burden and case fatality rate of 946 and 80 per 10000 vehicles respectively.

== Circumcision ==
One common cultural practice, irrespective of religion or economic status, is female genital mutilation (FGM), also known as female genital cutting (FGC), a procedure that involves partial or total removal of the external female genitalia, or other injury to the female genital organs for non-medical reasons. The practice was made illegal in Ethiopia in 2004. FGM is a pre-marital custom mainly endemic to Northeast Africa and parts of the Near East that has its ultimate origins in Ancient Egypt. Encouraged by women in the community, it is primarily intended to deter promiscuity and to offer protection from assault.

Ethiopia has a high prevalence of FGM, but prevalence is lower among young girls. Ethiopia's 2005 Demographic and Health Survey (EDHS) noted that the national prevalence rate is 74% among women ages 15–49. The practice is almost universal in the regions of Dire Dawa, Somali, and Afar. In the Oromo and Harari regions, more than 80% of girls and women undergo the procedure. FGC is least prevalent in the regions of Tigray and Gambela, where 29% and 27% of girls and women, respectively, are affected. According to a 2010 study performed by the Population Reference Bureau, Ethiopia has a prevalence rate of 81% among women ages 35 to 39 and 62% among women ages 15–19. A 2014 UNICEF report found that only 24% of girls under 14 had undergone FGM.

Male circumcision is also practised in the country, and about 76% of Ethiopia's male population is reportedly circumcised.

== Mental health ==
The National Mental Health Strategy, published in 2012, introduced the development of policy designed to improve mental health care in Ethiopia. This strategy mandated that mental health be integrated into the primary health care system. However, the success of the National Mental Health Strategy has been limited. For example, the burden of depression is estimated to have increased 34.2% from 2007 to 2017. Furthermore, the prevalence of stigmatizing attitudes, inadequate leadership and co-ordination of efforts, as well as a lack of mental health awareness in the general population, all remain as obstacles to successful mental health care.

== Traditional medicine ==
The low availability of health care professionals with modern medical training, together with lack of funds for medical services, leads to the preponderancy of less reliable traditional healers that use home-based therapies to heal common ailments. High rates of unemployment leave many Ethiopian citizens unable to support their families. In Ethiopia an increasing number of "false healers" using home-based medicines have grown with the rising population. The differences between real and false healers are almost impossible to distinguish. However, only about ten percent of practicing healers are true Ethiopian healers. Much of the false practice can be attributed to commercialization of medicine and the high demand for healing. Both men and women are known to practice medicine from their homes. It is most commonly the men that dispense herbal medicine similar to an out of home pharmacy.

Ethiopian healers are more commonly known as traditional medical practitioners. Before the onset of Christian missionaries and medical revolution sciences, traditional medicine was the only form of treatment available. Traditional healers extract healing ingredients from wild plants, animals and rare minerals. AIDS, malaria, tuberculosis and dysentery are the leading causes of disease-related death. Largely because of the costs, traditional medicine continues to be the most common form of medicine practiced. Many Ethiopians are unemployed which makes it difficult to pay for most medicinal treatments. Ethiopian medicine is heavily reliant on magical and supernatural beliefs that have little or no relation to the actual disease itself. Many physical ailments are believed to be caused by the spiritual realm which is the reason healers are most likely to integrate spiritual and magical healing techniques. Traditional medicinal practice is strongly related to the rich cultural beliefs of Ethiopia, which explains the emphasis of its use.

In Ethiopian culture there are two main theories of the cause of disease. The first is attributed to God or other supernatural forces, while the other is attributed to external factors such as unclean drinking water and unsanitary food. Most genetic diseases or deaths are viewed as the will of God. Miscarriages are thought to be the result of demonic spirits.

It was not until Protestant missionaries traveled to Ethiopia bringing new religious beliefs and education that modern medicine was infused into Ethiopian medicine. Today there are three medical schools in Ethiopia that began training students in 1965 two of which are linked to Addis Ababa University. There is only one psychiatric treatment facility in the whole country because Ethiopian culture is resistant to psychiatric treatment. Although there have been huge leaps and bounds in medical technology there is still a large problem in the distribution of medicine and doctors in Ethiopia.

== Tobacco use in Ethiopia ==
Tobacco use is the major single known risk factor for non-communicable diseases from the four listed main risk factors (diet, physical activity, and harmful use of alcohol). NCDs are the leading cause of premature death and disability in Ethiopia accounts for about 42% of deaths, of which 27% are premature deaths before 70 years of age. NCDs are estimated to account for 39% of all deaths in Ethiopia, while 71% in the world. Recently, the burden of these diseases is rising rapidly among populations in the low-income countries.

The effect of using tobacco, like cardiovascular diseases (heart attack and stroke), cancers, chronic respiratory diseases and lung diseases. The proportional mortality of cardiovascular diseases and stroke is about 16%, 2% of chronic respiratory diseases, 7% cancers, 2% diabetes and 12% other non-communicable diseases from 39% total mortality. Although, smoking during the pregnancy period increased risk for complication pregnancy, increased risk for tuberculosis, eye diseases and problem of immune system. The use of tobacco has been complex condition, which influenced by a range of individual, affect social interaction, economic factors, our perceptions and causes for behavioral changes of smokers, including the contamination of weather condition.

Table 1: Tobacco use among place of residence by 2015
Place of residence	Males % current smokers	Females % current smokers	Both sexes % current smokers
Rural	7.3	0.3	4.3
Urban	7.6	0.9	3.9

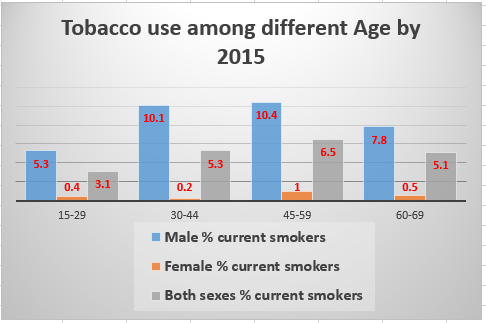
Tobacco use among different age group by 2015

From the Table above, Tobacco relatively used in rural 4.3% than urban 3.9% for both sexes current smokers. The percentage of male's current smokers among 45-59 age group 10.4%, 1% Female's and both sexes' current smokers are 6.5% and the use of tobacco among this age group shows increasing when compared to others age group in 2015. The overall tobacco use among adults age (15+) were 4.2% in 2015 and declined to 4% in 2016. Smoking prevalence of males were high according to both residences and among all age group when compared to females.

Ethiopia ratified the WHO Framework Convention on Tobacco Control (FCTC) in 2014 and detailed directives have been developed by Ethiopian Food Medicine and Health Care Administration and Control Authority. Some of the key directives that need to be implemented include:

1. Protection from exposure to tobacco smoke;
2. Regulation of the contents of tobacco products and tobacco product disclosures;
3. Packaging and labeling of tobacco products;
4. Prohibition of sales of tobacco products to minors.

== Community based health insurance ==
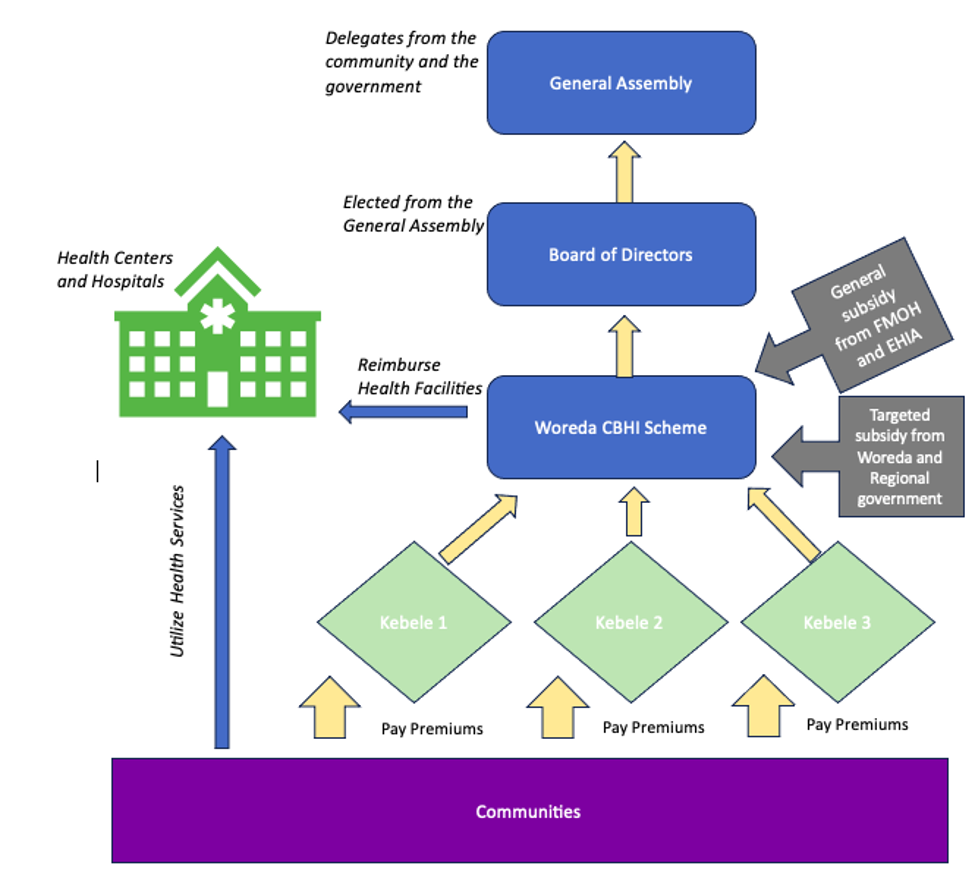
Organization of CBHI in Ethiopia

According to the WHO, community based health insurance (CBHI) is a non-profit health insurance scheme that targets the low-income portion of the population. As implied in the name, it is community based where funds(premiums) are usually pooled at a flat rate from members of the community on voluntary basis. In Ethiopia, where health care is largely financed by donors and out-of-pocket payments, a health insurance agency was established to give some financial risk protection against health care expenditures. The agency mainly works in implementing two forms of health insurance schemes: social health insurance (SHI) for the population in the formal sector of the economy and CBHI for the population engaged in the informal sector.

CBHI was launched in 2011 at 13 selected rural districts. It was later expanded starting from 2015 and got incorporated in the second health sector transformation plan (HSTP-II). Currently there are over 800 Woredas where CBHI is launched, covering the majority area of the country. Experts have observed that CBHI can only play a limited role in achieving universal health coverage for various reasons. Some of the identified barriers in the implementation of CBHI in sub-Saharan Africa include lack of awareness about the value of health insurance, socio-economic status, health beliefs, and lack of trust.

Table 2: Trend of Coverage of CBHI in Woredas across the regions of Ethiopia Source: EHIA MRCCD Annual Reports (2008-2012E.C)
Number of CBHI Woredas by Region
Region	2008 E.C.		2009 E.C.		2010 E.C.		2011 E.C.		2012 E.C.	
Region	Launched	Expansion	Launched	Expansion	Launched	Expansion	Launched	Expansion	Launched	Expansion
Amhara	76	17	104	7	133	23	149	31	176	6
Oromia	70	61	109	33	124	73	201	45	281	13
SNNP	40	27	49	28	70	37	88	45	148	25
Tigray	17	1	18	18	21	15	29	7	36	0
Ben/Gumuz					2	1	2	6	3	4
Addis Ababa					10	0	40	0	120	0
Hareri					0	9	0	9	5	4
Afar					0	1	0	1	1	0
Gambella					0	3	0	3	0	3
Dire Dawa					0	1	0	1	0	1
Somali									0	1
National	203	106	280	86	360	163	509	148	770	57

CBHI protects households from catastrophic health expenditure. Studies show that there is a high level of willingness to enroll in the CBHI scheme and that the premiums are affordable by most households. All of these show that in the future the coverage of CBHI will be much more expanded, but other financial schemes need to be implemented to ensure universal health coverage in Ethiopia.

== See also ==
- Healthcare in Ethiopia
- Famines in Ethiopia
- HIV/AIDS in Ethiopia
- Water supply and sanitation in Ethiopia
- COVID-19 pandemic in Ethiopia
