= Wadla =

District in Amhara Region, Ethiopia

Coordinates: 11°50′N 38°50′E

Wadla ዋድላ
- Woreda
- Flag
- Interactive map of Wadla
- Zone: Semien Wollo
- Region: Amhara

Area
  - Total: 855.29 km^{2} (330.23 sq mi)

Population (2012 est.)
  - Total: 138,668
  - Density: 162.13/km^{2} (419.91/sq mi)

Wadla (Amharic: ዋድላ) is a woreda in Amhara Region, Ethiopia. It is named for the former district which lay roughly in the same area. Part of the Semien Wollo Zone, Wadla is bordered on the southeast by Delanta, on the southwest by Dawunt, on the north by Meket, and on the northeast by Guba Lafto. The major town in Wadla is Gashena. Other towns include Kone and Arbit.

The altitude of this woreda ranges from 1700 to 3200 meters above sea level. It lies in the watershed of the Bashilo; rivers include the Zhit'a. Wadla, as well as the other seven rural woredas of this Zone, has been grouped amongst the 48 woredas identified as the most drought prone and food insecure in the Amhara Region.

== Demographics ==
A 2012 estimate puts the population at 138,668. This gives a population density of 162.13 people per square kilometer (419.91 people per square mile), given its area of 855.28 square kilometers (330.23 square miles), higher than the North Wollo Zone average of 134.66 people per square kilometer (348.76 people per square mile).

Based on the 2007 national census conducted by the Central Statistical Agency of Ethiopia (CSA), this woreda has a total population of 128,170, an increase of over the 1994 census, of whom 64,574 are men and 63,596 women; 4,291 or 3.35% are urban inhabitants. With an area of 855.29 square kilometers, Wadla has a population density of 149.86 people per square kilometer (338.12 people per square mile), which is greater than the Zone average of 123.25 people per square kilometer (319.22 people per square mile). A total of 28,414 households were counted in this woreda, resulting in an average of 4.51 persons to a household, and 27,481 housing units.

The 1994 national census reported a total population for this woreda of 106,681 in 24,473 households, of whom 54,760 were men and 51,921 were women; 1,506 or 1.41% of its population were urban dwellers.

The largest ethnic group reported in Wadla was the Amhara (99.94%). Amharic was spoken as a first language by 99.95%. The majority of the population practiced Ethiopian Orthodox Christianity with 96.21% reported to profess this belief, while 3.78% of the population said they were Muslim. By 2007 this moved to 97.08% reporting Ethiopian Orthodox Christianity as their religion, while 2.9% of the population said they were Muslim.
