= Bugna =

District in Amhara Region, Ethiopia

Coordinates: 12°20′N 38°45′E

Bugna ቡግና
- Woreda
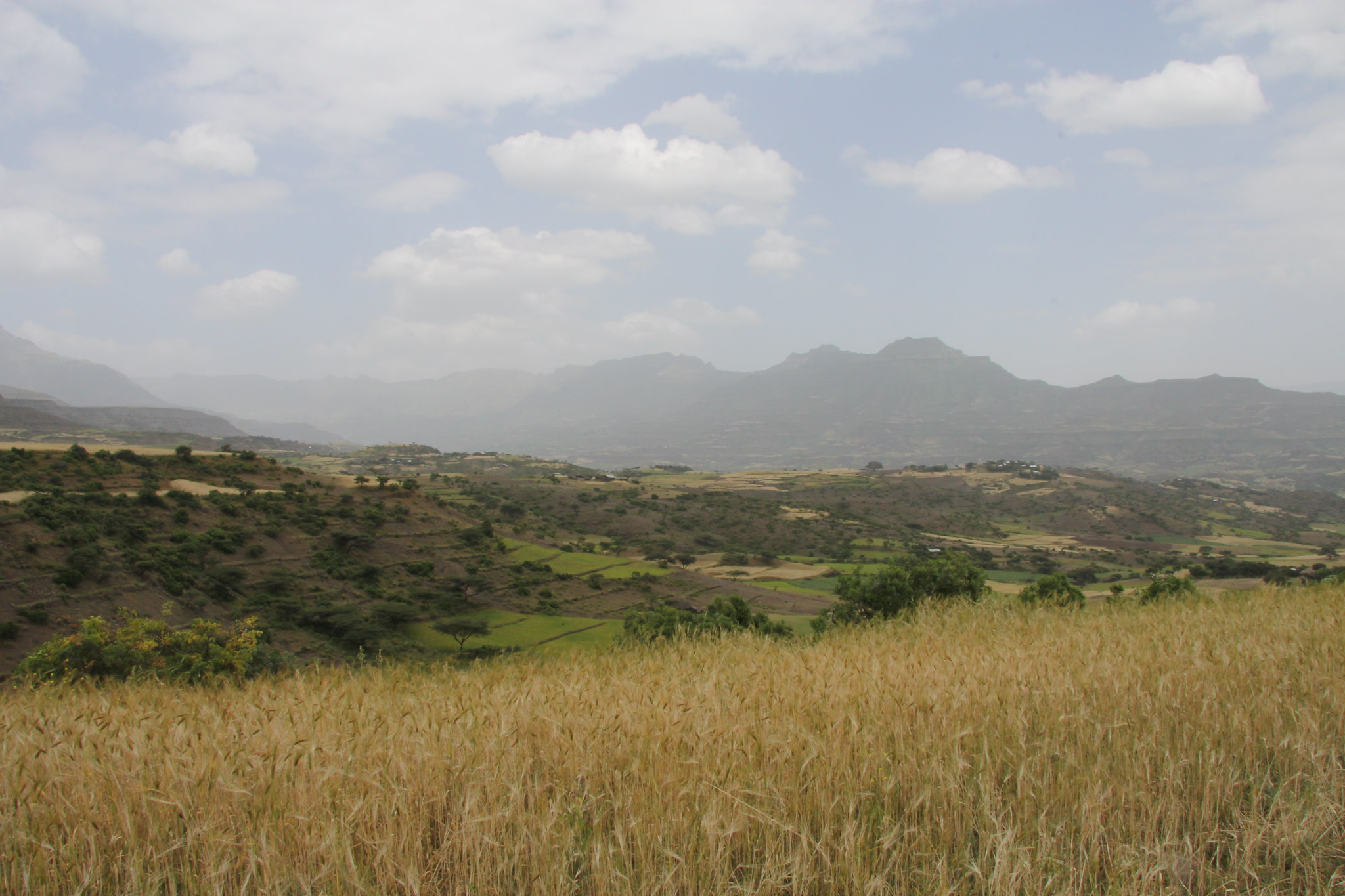

- Flag
- Interactive map of Bugna
- Country: Ethiopia
- Region: Amhara
- Zone: Semien Wollo

Area
  - Total: 1,302.95 km^{2} (503.07 sq mi)

Population (2012 est.)
  - Total: 81,284
  - Density: 62.39/km^{2} (161.58/sq mi)

Bugna (Amharic: ቡግና būgnā, not pronounced "buña") is a woreda in Amhara Region, Ethiopia. It is named after the former district. Located in the northwest corner of the Semien Wollo Zone, Bugna is bordered on the south by Meket, on the west by the Debub Gondar Zone, on the north by the Wag Hemra Zone, and on the east by the Lasta woreda. The main town is Ayne. The Lasta woreda, where Lalibela is, was split off from Bugna.

== Overview ==
The altitude of this woreda ranges from 900 to over 4100 meters above sea level; the highest point in Bugna is Mount Abuna Yosef, on the border with Gidan; other notable peaks include Mount Qachen. Rivers include the Tekezé, which has its source in this woreda. Besides Lalibela, other notable landmarks in Bugna include the church of Yemrehana Krestos, as well as the ancient churches of Makina Madbane Alem, Bilbala Tcherqos, Kankanet Mikael, and Gennete Maryam.

A 1994 survey found Bugna extremely impoverished: "If you compare a farmer from this community with one from, say Debre Birhan, there is a big difference. In this community even better-off farmers sometimes migrate. Children leave their schools during the migration season." At least one part of the woreda has reportedly endured a serious famine for the previous 10 years. However, elders remembered that between 1952 and 1968 there was surplus production of various grains, and inhabitants could maintain a two-year stock of grain. Elders also report that in 1935 almost 85% of the land was covered with trees. The deforestation rate increased after the land was nationalized. Before then, the forests were privately owned and no-one was allowed to cut trees; after nationalization people started cutting trees and selling firewood. No measures were taken to control this until the time of the survey. To combat increasing droughts and improve crop yields, one irrigation project has been undertaken in this woreda by the Commission for Sustainable Agriculture and Environmental Rehabilitation in the Amhara Region, affecting 70 hectares (170 acres) and benefiting 110 households.

== History ==
Bugna is part of the area of the Wagshum, the traditional ruler of Lasta. Professor Taddesse Tamrat records a tradition he heard from an old priest in Lalibela that Emperor Kaleb of Axum was a man of Lasta, and his palace was at Bugna, where it is known that Gebre Mesqel had later established his centre.

While there was no villagization in Bugna under the Derg, in 1979 and again in 1985 thousands were forcibly resettled in Welega and Bale; since the end of the Ethiopian Civil War, these settlers have been returning in large numbers to find no land, homes, or property waiting for them. During the Derg regime, Bugna was a center of resistance. The western half of the woreda, including 'Ayne, had been a strategic base for Ethiopian Peoples Democratic Movement fighters beginning in 1981, owing to its rugged topography which made it inaccessible to the central government. The eastern part of the woreda, including Lalibela, fell to Ethiopian People's Revolutionary Democratic Front forces in 1988. Derg forces made two unsuccessful attempts to drive the rebels out in 1985 and 1988.

the 1994 survey found that they are culturally affiliated to the neighbouring Agaws in the Wag Hemra Zone, and share a related history. Inter-marriage between the two people is quite common.

In the 2005 Ethiopian elections, the electoral district of Bugna elected Bereket Simon (Amhara National Democratic Movement, one of the partners in the Ethiopian People's Revolutionary Democratic Front) as their representative in the House of Peoples' Representatives.

== Demographics ==
A 2012 estimate puts the population at 81,284. This gives a population density of 62.39 people per square kilometer (161.58 people per square mile), given its area of 1302.95 square kilometers (503.07 square miles), less than half the North Wollo Zone average of 134.66 people per square kilometer (348.76 people per square mile).

Based on the 2007 national census conducted by the Central Statistical Agency of Ethiopia (CSA), this woreda has a total population of 75,486, a decrease of 55.94% from the 1994 census, of whom 37,877 are men and 37,609 women; no urban inhabitants were identified. With an area of 1,302.95 square kilometers, Bugna has a population density of 57.93 people per square kilometer (150.05 people per square mile), which is less than the Zone average of 123.25 people per square kilometer (319.22 people per square mile). A total of 18,687 households were counted in this woreda, resulting in an average of 4.04 persons to a household, and 18,101 housing units.

The 1994 national census reported a total population for this woreda of 171,333 in 41,146 households, of whom 86,612 were men and 84,721 were women; 8,484 or 4.95% of its population were urban dwellers.

The largest ethnic group reported in Bugna was the Amhara (99.87%). Amharic was spoken as a first language by 99.89%. The majority of the population in 1994 practiced Ethiopian Orthodox Christianity with 98.28% professing this belief, while 1.59% of the population said they were Muslim. By 2007 99.19% reported Ethiopian Orthodox Christianity as their religion.
