= Seeds of Hope: HIV/AIDS in Ethiopia =

- Directed by: Dorothy Fadiman
- Produced by: Henock Hailu, Amy Hill, Matt Luotto, Shenaz Zack
- Narrated by: Dorothy Fadiman
- Music by: Aster Aweke
- Release date: 2006
- Country: United States
- Languages: Amharic and English

Seeds of Hope: HIV/AIDS in Ethiopia is a set of five documentary films about individuals and organizations working to break the silence, lift the stigma and prevent the spread of HIV/AIDS in Ethiopia. The films focus on activists, family members, humanitarian groups, and health care professionals, all acting as advocates for awareness. The films were directed by filmmaker, Dorothy Fadiman. The films are in Amharic with English subtitles.

The five films in the series are: From Risk to Action: Women & HIV/AIDS in Ethiopia (2006), Breaking the Silence: Lifting the Stigma of HIV/AIDS (2006), Stepping Forward: Men Teaching and Learning about HIV/AIDS (2006), HIV/AIDS Awareness: Approaches to Prevention (2006), and Whose Children Are They Now?: AIDS Orphans in Ethiopia (2006).

== From Risk to Action: Women & HIV/AIDS in Ethiopia (2006) ==
This film examines the gender bias and the biology of transmission in Ethiopia which makes women more vulnerable than men to become infected. This film profiles the connection between gender and HIV/AIDS, as well as the work of leaders in education and policy change to improve the status of women.

== Breaking the Silence: Lifting the Stigma of HIV/AIDS (2006) ==
This film documents HIV-positive people, who speak out despite the risk of social stigma and become active in their communities, working to reduce discrimination and secure better services. This film details their stories and profiles groups that provide counseling, income support, and prevention education.

== Stepping Forward: Men Teaching and Learning about HIV/AIDS (2006) ==
This film examines certain populations of men, such as truck drivers and soldiers, who suffer high rates of infection. The film details the intensive education programs in Ethiopia to reach such individuals to heighten their awareness of safer sex practices.

== HIV/AIDS Awareness: Approaches to Prevention (2006) ==
This film follows Ethiopians who are working to prevent the spread of HIV/AIDS through education, communication through radio, television, and print media. The film also chronicles preventive education through street theater, coffee ceremonies, and funeral gatherings. The film features a home video of the wedding of Alebachew Teka, who included many HIV-positive children as honored guests.

== Whose Children Are They Now?: AIDS Orphans in Ethiopia (2006) ==
The AIDS epidemic has left more than one million children without parents in Ethiopia. This film explores the stories of compassionate caregivers and the young people for whom they care.

== Screenings ==
- 2006 Linking Reproductive Health, Family Planning and HIV/AIDS in Africa in Addis Ababa, Ethiopia
