= Wegeltena =

Town in northern Ethiopia

Wegeltena (also known as Wegel Tena; Amharic: ወገል ጤና), is a town and administrative center of the Delanta woreda in northern Ethiopia. Located in the South Wollo zone of the Amhara Region, the town has a latitude and longitude of 11°35′N 39°13′E with an elevation of 3010 meters above sea level.

== History ==
Wegeltena was established in 1891 during the zenith reign of Ras Wäle Bəțul, brother of Empress Țaytu. He ruled Dälanta, Wadla, Dawunt, Mäqet and Yäğğu wärädas at his capital in Märțo town in Yäğğu, where his son Dejamach Amäde Wäle is recognized for its status as a political ownership. Successive descendants of Bəțul, a very powerful Yäğğu dynasty, had ruled Wadla and Dälanta; thus started the era of "Wadla Dälanta" axiom.

On 29 January 1990 during the Ethiopian Civil War Wegeltena was bombed by the Ethiopian Air Force, which killed two people. John Graham passed through the town about ten years later and wrote in the Addis Tribune that he found it "a remote spot, with one of those Derg era metal towers in the main square, this one unusually decrepit. However, they had a pleasant luncheon there."

Situated on the recently constructed main road between Dessie and Lalibela via Kone and Gashena, Wegeltena is expected to become a communication link between these historical places. The city also known by precious mineral called “opal”.

== Demographics ==
Based on figures from the Central Statistical Agency in 2005, Wegeltena has an estimated total population of 7,205 of whom 3,478 are men and 3,727 are women. The 1994 census reported this town had a total population of 4,166 of whom 1,830 were males and 2,336 were females. It was the main town of the former Wadila Delanta Awuraja. It is also the administrative center of the present Delanta woreda. During the Derg era, the town had the Wegeltena senior high school in Wadila Delanta Awuraja which was instrumental in developing several successful university professors and research scientists, including Dr. Kassa Semagn who has been working in international research organizations and academia.
