= Birru =

Birru is a surname. Notable people with the surname include:

- Ayalew Birru (1892–1945), Ethiopian army commander and patriot
- Dejazmach Birru, 19th-century Ethiopian warlord
- Tadesse Birru (1921–1975), Ethiopian general
