= Bashilo River =

Bashilo River Beshitta
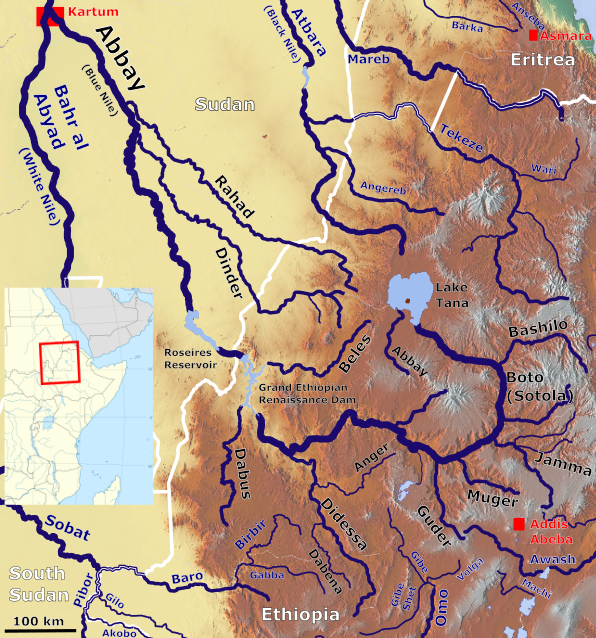
- Map showing the Abbay basin, with the Bashilo River (Centre right)

Location
- Country: Ethiopia
- Region: Amhara
- Zone: South /Debub Gondar, Semien Wollo, Debub Wollo

Physical characteristics
- Mouth: Blue Nile
  - coordinates: 11°2′26″N 38°28′31″E
  - elevation: 1,302 m (4,272 ft)
- Length: 218 km (135 mi)
- Basin size: 13,242 km^{2} (5,113 sq mi)

Basin features
- Progression: Blue Nile → Nile → Mediterranean Sea
- River system: Nile Basin
- Population: 2,730,000
- Tributaries
  - right: Tergiya, Checheho

The Bashilo River (less often known as the Beshitta) is located in Ethiopia. Known for its canyon, which one source describes as almost as extensive as the canyon of its parent the Abay, also known as the Blue Nile, the river originates just west of Kutaber in the Amhara Region. Flowing first in a northwesterly direction to where the Tergiya empties into it, it then heads southwest to its confluence with the Abay. Its drainage area is about 13,242 square kilometres in size, covering portions of the Semien Gondar, Semien Wollo and Debub Wollo Zones. Its tributaries include the Checheho, and the Walano.

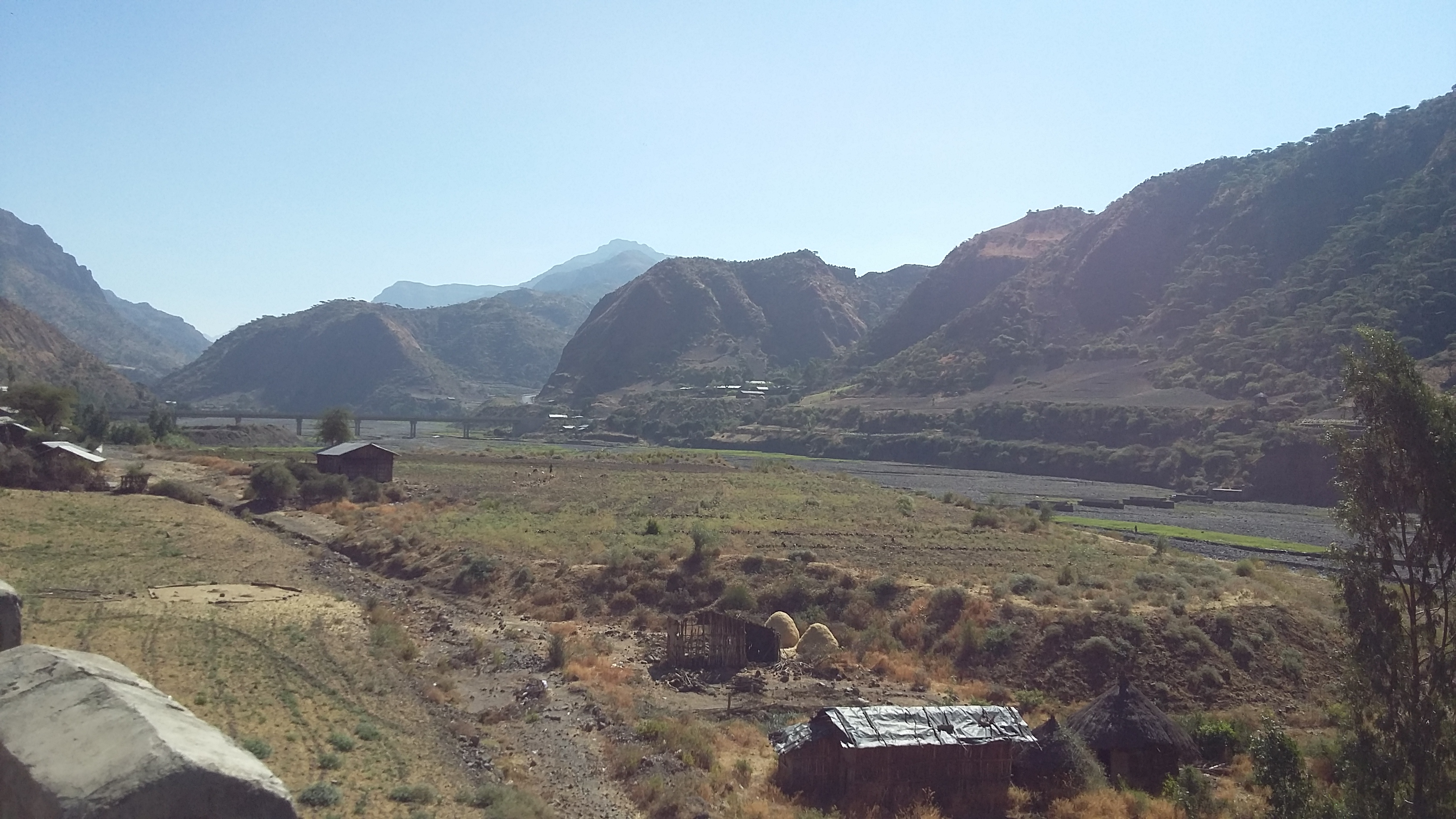
Beshlo River, and the bridge across the river near Kutaber

The Bashilo was also important for defining the boundaries of Ethiopian provinces. In the 17th century, it separated Begemder from Amhara Sayint. By the late 18th century, it had become the northern boundary of Shewa, as illustrated by the refusal of Emperor Tekle Giyorgis I to cross the Bashilo because they would enter that province. The river remained the northern boundary of Shewa as late as 1870 by Negus Menelik of Shewa in a letter to G.R. Goodfellow.

== See also ==
- List of rivers of Ethiopia
