= Checheho River =

Small river in Amhara Region, Ethiopia

Location
- Country: Ethiopia
- Region: Amhara

Physical characteristics
- Source
  - coordinates: 11.84391°N 39.33852°E
  - elevation: 2,750 m (9,020 ft)
- Mouth: Bashilo River
  - coordinates: 11.416922°N 38.705558°E
  - elevation: 1,338 m (4,390 ft)
- Length: 136 km (85 mi)
- Basin size: 2,990 km^{2} (1,150 sq mi)

Basin features
- Progression: Bashilo → Blue Nile → Nile → Mediterranean Sea
- River system: Nile Basin
- Population: 791,000
- Tributaries
  - left: Zhit'a

The Checheho River is a small river located in north-central Ethiopia. Part of the watershed of the Abay River, it rises to the east of Debre Zebit to flow south to join the Bashilo River. Its major tributary is the Zhit'a, which enters the Checheho on the left side. This region's rivers, including the Checheho, contribute to the larger Blue Nile basin and are essential to local agriculture and water systems, particularly in the Amhara region, which relies on these tributaries for various water needs.

== Checheho town ==
Checheho is located near the source of the homonymous river, along the highway between Weldiya and Debre Tabor. The town holds an important monastery.

== See also ==
- List of rivers of Ethiopia
