= North Wollo Zone =

Zone in Amhara Region of Ethiopia

Coordinates: 11°50′N 39°15′E

North Wollo ሰሜን ወሎ
- Zone
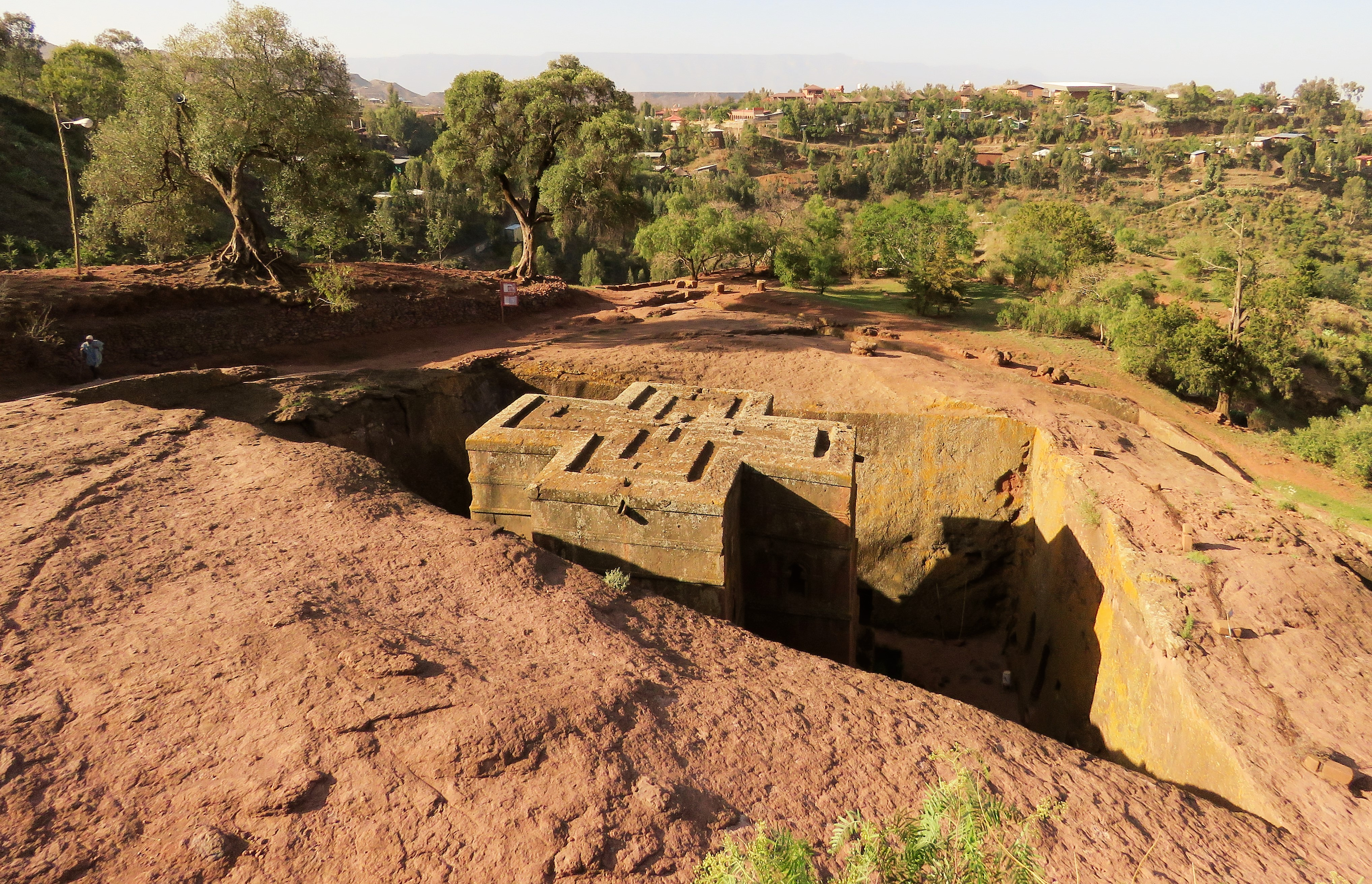
- Church of Saint George of Lalibela also found in this zone

- Flag
- Interactive map of North Wollo
- Country: Ethiopia
- Region: Amhara
- Largest city: Woldiya

Area
  - Total: 12,172.50 km^{2} (4,699.83 sq mi)

Population (2012 est.)
  - Total: 1,639,151
  - Density: 134.66/km^{2} (348.76/sq mi)

Map of the regions and zones of Ethiopia

North Wollo (Amharic: ሰሜን ወሎ) also called North Wello, Semen or Semien Wollo, is one of Zones of Amhara Region in Ethiopia. It is bordered on the south by South Wollo, on the west by South Gondar, on the north by Wag Hemra, on the northeast by Tigray Region, and on the east by Afar Region; part of its southern border is defined by the Mille River. Its highest point is Mount Abuna Yosef. Its towns include Lasta Lalibela (known for its rock-cut churches) and Weldiya (also spelled Woldia). North Wollo acquired its name from the former province of Wollo.

== Overview ==
All eight rural woredas of this Zone have been grouped amongst the 48 woredas identified as the most drought prone and food insecure in the Amhara Region.

Most of this Zone is mountainous and characterized by steep slopes, which are unsuitable for agriculture and severely limits the cultivated area. A survey of the land in this Zone shows that 24% is arable or cultivable, 4.6% pasture, 0.37% forest, 17.4% shrubland, 47.3% degraded or unusable, and the remaining 6.3% all other uses. To combat increasing droughts and improve crop yields, 12 irrigation projects have been undertaken in five woredas, affecting 1.64 square kilometers and benefiting 6,783 households.

Historical Districts of Semien Wollo include Raya Kobo, Lasta Lalibela, Wadla, Delanta, Gidan, Bugna, and Meket.

== Demographics ==
A 2012 estimate puts the population at 1,639,151. This gives a population density of 134.66 people per square kilometer (348.76 people per square mile), given its area of 12,172.50 square kilometers (4,699.83 square miles).

Based on the 2007 Census conducted by the Central Statistical Agency of Ethiopia (CSA), this Zone has a total population of 1,500,303, an increase of 19.04% over the 1994 census, of whom 752,895 are men and 747,408 women; with an area of 12,172.50 square kilometers, North Wollo has a population density of 123.25 people per square kilometer (319.22 people per square mile). While 155,273 or 10.35% are urban inhabitants, a further 2 persons are pastoralists. A total of 355,974 households were counted in this Zone, which results in an average of 4.21 persons to a household, and 343,504 housing units.

The 1994 national census reported a total population for this Zone of 1,260,317 in 309,231 households, of whom 633,702 were men and 626,615 women; 89,055 or 7.07% of its population were urban dwellers at the time.

The largest ethnic group reported in 1994 in North Wollo was the Amhara (99.61%); all other ethnic groups made up 0.39% of the population. Amharic was spoken as a first language by 99.62%; the remaining 0.38% spoke all other primary languages reported. 83.36% practiced Ethiopian Orthodox Christianity, and 10% of the population said they were Muslim. By 2007 little had changed regarding the density of ethnic Amharans, at 99.38%, or the language, with Amharic being spoken as a first language by 99.28% and the remaining 0.72% speaking all other primary languages reported. However, by that time while the practice of Ethiopian Orthodox Christianity had changed to 82.74%, the population reporting as Muslim had gone up to 17.08%.

According to a May 24, 2004 World Bank memorandum, 6% of the inhabitants of North Wollo have access to electricity, this zone has a road density of 69.7 kilometers per 1000 square kilometers (compared to the national average of 30 kilometers), the average rural household has 0.7 hectare of land (compared to the national average of 1.01 hectare of land and a regional average of 0.75 for the Amhara Region) and the equivalent of 0.7 heads of livestock. 13.2% of the population is in non-farm related jobs, compared to the national average of 25% and a Regional average of 21%. 27% of the zone is exposed to malaria, and none to tsetse fly. The memorandum gave this zone a drought risk rating of 577.

== Education ==
According to the 2004 World Bank memorandum, at the time 48% of all eligible children in this Zone are enrolled in primary school, and 10% in secondary schools. However, in October 2006, the Zonal education department announced that the construction of 48 new schools in the previous year had increased school enrolment by 41,000. This raised the total enrollment to 228,990 out of an estimated 300,000 potential students, or a total 76% of all eligible students.
