= Slavery in Ethiopia =

Slavery in Ethiopia existed for centuries, going as far back as 1495 BC and ending in 1942. There are also sources indicating the export of slaves from the Aksumite Empire (100–940 AD). The practice formed an integral part of Ethiopian society. Slaves were traditionally drawn from the Nilotic groups locally known as Shanqella. War captives were another source of slaves, though the perception, treatment and duties of these prisoners was markedly different. Religious law banned Christian slave masters from taking Christians as slaves, however many Muslim Ethiopian slave traders took part in the Arab slave trade. In what is now Ethiopia, the Abyssinian Church justified slavery with its version of the Curse of Ham, a belief possibly adopted from medieval Jewish and Muslim scholars which would later find its way to the western world.

The abolition of slavery became a high priority for the Haile Selassie regime which began in 1930. International pressures forced action, and it was required for membership in the League of Nations. During Italian occupation, the temporary government issued two laws in October 1935 and in April 1936 which abolished slavery and freed 420,000 Ethiopian slaves. After the Italians were expelled, Emperor Haile Selassie returned to power and officially abolished slavery and involuntary servitude, by making it a law on 26 August 1942. Ethiopia later ratified the 1926 Slavery Convention in 1969. Following the abolition of slavery in the 1940s, freed slaves were typically employed as unskilled labour by their former masters.

== History ==
=== Aksumite Empire ===
The Ethiopian-Eritrean region, strategically located between two major trade routes, served as a significant center for the slave trade. It had access to the Red Sea in the east and the Nile Valley in the west, which connected it to a global market for slaves over many centuries. Additionally, this region supplied slaves to the Hellenistic and Roman worlds due to its connections to Mediterranean trade. The areas between the Aksumite and Sudanic empires, situated in the Nilo-Saharan region, were often targeted for raids and the capture of slaves. The port of Adulis was renowned as a hub for the slave trade from as early as the 1st century by Pliny the Elder. Excavations at the Aksumite site of Matara uncovered a human skeleton still wearing shackles. In the 6th century, Greek traveler Cosmas Indicopleustes indicated that most slaves were brought from the tribes of the conquered regions named in the Monumentum Adulitanum.

=== Medieval era ===
Emperor Amda Seyon's conquests resulted in a significant number of slaves. His chronicler frequently noted the capture of numerous prisoners during his military expeditions: "He went to the country of Hadiya and killed [many of] the people of that land and the rest he made captives with their king, great [men] and small, men and women, old and young, and transported them into his kingdom." The terms used by Amda Seyon's chroniclers in describing his successes clearly indicate that slave-raiding was an important by-product of many of his campaigns: "At this time Gemaldin the king of the Moslems came to the king with many gifts and said, 'I pray you, O king, return to your capital, since you have appointed me your (ruler), and I will do your will. For behold, the land of the Moslems is now ruined. Leave what remains (in) the country and do not ravage it again, that they may work for you by trading, because I and all the Moslem peoples are your slaves.' The king answered him angrily, saying, 'It is not when I am bitten by hyenas and dogs, sons of vipers and children of evil which trust not in the Son of God, that I return to my capital; and if I return before I have ravaged the land of Adal, may I become like her who bore me, my mother; may I not be called a man but may I be called a woman" A medieval Ge'ez ecclesiastical account gives a picture of the commercial exploits: "[The Muslim traders] did business in India, Egypt, and among the people of Greece with the money of the king. He gave them ivory, and excellent horses from Shäwa and red, pure gold from Enarya... and these Muslims... went to Egypt, Greece, and Rome and exchanged them for very rich damasks adorned with green and scarlet stones and with the leaves of red gold, which they brought to the king" Ivory was a valuable trade commodity in the kingdom since ancient times, with the Takaze, Barka, and Ansäba rivers, and other regions being rich in elephants and other wildlife. The kings organized systematic elephant hunts and entrusted the tusks to their commercial agents.

In the 14th century, the Muslim scholar al-Umari described the slave trade and the interactions between Islamic principalities and Christian highland kingdoms, noting that castration was practiced in a certain place called Washlu, south of Christian Ethiopia. The castrates would then heal in the Muslim principality of Hadiya before being sold at high prices in Arabia, where eunuchs were greatly valued. This division of labor between Washlu, a pagan place, specializing in castration, and Hadiya, specializing in healing, François-Xavier Fauvelle noted it "was motivated less by economic rationality than by the common hypocrisy that allowed Christians and Muslims to collaborate in a practice whose operation they preferred not to see."

The Ethiopian Christian state was at around this time established contact with another "black" people known as the Shanqellas, who lived around the lower stretches of the Blue Nile. Similar to the baryas, the country of the Shanqellas would become the target of frequent slave raids by the Abyssinians. According to a fifteenth-century soldier's song of Emperor Yeshaq I, the Shanqellas were forced to pay tribute to the Abyssinians. At around this time, a code known as the Fetha Negest (The Law of the Kings), was translated into Ge'ez and had begun to serve as the traditional law for Ethiopian Orthodox Christians. Based on this law, freeborn Christians were of free status and off limits, while non-Christians captured in war could be enslaved. Slavery was therefore caused by unbelief, and yet the conversion of pagan slaves to Christianity subsequent to the establishment of the right of ownership by masters did not extinguish slavery. In this way, the code provided the ground for a religiously justified exclusion and enslavement of non-Christians and Christians whose slavery was caused by previous unbelief.

During the reign of Sarsa Dengel, many pagan southern peoples had converted to Christianity to avoid further slave raids. Among those who requested conversion were the Gafat people in the former district of Shat in Damot; Sarsa Dengel granted their request in 1581. Similarly, the people of Ennarea had requested to be converted, which Sarsa Dengel also accepted in 1587. During the Oromo migrations of 16th century many indigenous peoples made into Gabaros (serfs). The Oromos adopted the Gabaros in mass, adopting them to the qomo (clan) in a process known as Mogasa and Gudifacha. Through collective adoption, the affiliated groups were given new genealogies and started counting their putative ancestors in the same way as their adoptive kinsmen, and as a Gabaro they are required to pay their tributes and provide service for their conquerors. such as in Damot, where according to Bahrey, the Boran clan surrounded the province "enslaved the men and carried off the livestock".

Susenyos I would conduct six major slave raids against the Shanqellas on the western lowlands, which resulted in the capture of many slaves both female and male. His chronicler deprecatingly describes the color of the slaves as "black" and not "red like the normal people". Susneyos would come into the possession of vast numbers of black slaves whom he relocated to the Gondar area. According to Manuel de Almeida, many of these slaves would be appointed to the "highest offices" of the court, and that the Emperor trusted him more than his free born subjects. Almeida quotes that the Emperor once declared that the only men who were faithful to him were the ones he "created and made from dust".

=== Gondarine period ===
Further slave raiding against the western Shanqellas took place under Emperors Fasilides, Yohannes I and Iyasu I. As a result, Gondar and others parts of the Christian empire had a considerable slave population, mostly from Shanqellas and other "blacks" from the far west. James Bruce states every department was "full of them" and that boys and girls were taken in by the king and "instructed early in the Christian religion". Many of these slaves became soldiers, these slave troops were known as the Welajoch. The Welajoch, like many other slave troops in history, soon gained significant political power. After Dawit III's death in 1721, the “black” servants at the palace had attempted to seize power. Emperor Bakaffa subsequently ordered the banishment of all black slaves in Gondar and proclaimed that anyone found with one in their houses should receive a severe punishment. However, the Welajoch ignored the command and began to pillage the countryside. The chronicles condemns the Welajoch and states that they were murderers who had seized wives in the presence of their husbands, and virgins in front of their mothers and their "wickness was known to the whole world." Baffaka then dispatched a force and ambushed the Welajoch just south of Gondar. Many were killed and those that were captured were banished. The chronicler states that this victory led to much rejoicing in Gondar, whose citizens he claims, would have all been victims had the Welajoch succeeded.

Anestasyos launched an expedition against the Tulama in Shewa, where he was said to have captured thousands of Oromo slaves.

=== 18th to 20th centuries ===
Before the imperial expansion to the south Asandabo, Saqa, Hermata and Bonga were the primary slave markets for the kingdom of Guduru, Limmu-Enaria, Jimma and Kaffa. The merchant villages adjacent to these major markets of southwestern Ethiopia were invariably full of slaves, which the upper classes exchanged for the imported goods they coveted. Historian Ahmed Omer asserts that the Warjih people were the predominant force behind the slave trade industry within Abyssinia. The slaves were walked to the large distribution markets like Basso in Gojjam, Aliyu Amba and Abdul Resul in Shewa. The primary source of slaves for the southern territories was the continuous wars & raids between various clans and tribes which has been going on for thousands of years, and it usually follows with large scale slavery that was very common during the battles of that era. Slaves were often provided by various rulers who raided their neighbours. According to Donald Levine, it was common to see Oromos making slaves of Konso people. Famine was another source of slaves, and during times of recurrent drought and widespread cattle disease, slave markets throughout the country would be flooded with victims of famine. For instance, the Great Famine of 1890-91 forced many people from the Christian north (modern-day Tigray and Eritrea) as well as southern Ethiopia to even sell their children and, at times, themselves as slaves to Muslim merchants. Since religious law did not permit Christians to participate in the trade, Muslims dominated the slave trade, often going farther and farther afield to find supplies.

In southern Ethiopia the Gibe and Kaffa kings exercised their right to enslave and sell the children of parents too impoverished to pay their taxes. In Kaffa specifically, a father was entitled by law to sell his wife and children into slavery during difficult times. Even a fetus could be sold in Kaffa, during which the mother had to provide milk to the newborn for a period of 2 years before the child passed to the buyer. Guma is one of the Gibe states that adjoins Enarea where Abba Bogibo ruled and under his rule inhabitants of Guma were more than those of any other country doomed to slavery. Before Abba Rebu's adoption of Islamism the custom of selling whole families for minor crimes done by a single individual was a custom.

In the centralized Oromo states of Gibe valleys and Didesa, agriculture and industry sector was done mainly by slave labour. The Gibe states includes Jemma, Gudru, Limmu-Enarya and Gera. Adjacent to western Oromo states existed the Omotic kingdom of Kaffa as well as other southern states in the Gojab and Omo river basins where slaves were the main agrarian producers. In Gibe states one-third of the general population was composed of slaves while slaves were between half and two-thirds of the general population in Kingdoms of Jimma, Kaffa, Walamo, Gera, Janjero and Kucha. Even Kaffa reduced the number of slaves by mid 19th century fearing its large bonded population. Slave labour in the agriculture sector in southwest Ethiopia meant that slaves constituted a higher proportion of the general population when compared to northern Ethiopia where agrarian producers were mainly free Gabbars. Gabbars owned their own land as “rist” and their legal obligation was to pay one fifth of their produce as land tax and asrat, another one-tenth, with a total of one third of total production paid as tax to be shared between the gult holder and the state. In addition to these taxes, peasants of north Ethiopia had informal obligations where they would be forced “to undertake corvée (forced labour)" such as farming, grinding corn, and building houses and fences that claimed up to one-third of their time. This same Gabbar system was applied to South Ethiopia after the expansion of Shewan Kingdom while most of the southern ruling classes were made Balabates (gult holders) until emperor Haile Selassie abolished fiefdom (gultegna), the central institution of feudalism, in the south and north Ethiopia by 1966 after growing domestic pressure for land reform. The nineteenth century witnessed an unprecedented growth in slavery in the country, especially in southern Oromo towns, which expanded as the influx of slaves grew. In the Christian highlands, especially in the province of Shoa, the number of slaves was quite large by the mid-century. However, despite the war raids, the Oromo were not considered by the highlander Amharas groups as being ethnically 'barya', owing to their common Afro-Asiatic ancestry.

=== 20th century ===
Ethiopia stated to the Temporary Slavery Commission (1923–1925) that while slavery in Ethiopia was still legal, it was in a process of being phased out: that the slave trade was dying, that it was prohibited to sale, gift or will slaves, and that every child born to a slave after 1924 will be born free; that former slaves were to be sent back to their country of origin and that young ex-slaves were provided with education.

During the Temporary Slavery Commission (TSC), a flourishing slave trade was discovered between Sudan and Ethiopia: slave raids were conducted from Ethiopia to the Funj and White Nile provinces in South Sudan, capturing Berta, Gumuz and Burun non-Muslims, who were bought from Ethiopian slave traders by Arab Sudanese Muslims in Sudan or across the border in the independent Empire of Ethiopia.

The most prominent slave trader was Khojali al-Hassan, "Watawit" shaykh of Bela Shangul in Wallagi, and his principal wife Sitt Amna, who had been acknowledged by the British as the head of an administrative unit in Sudan in 1905. Khojali al-Hassan collected slaves – normally adolescent girls and boys or children – by kidnapping, debt servitude or as tribute from his feudal subjects, and would send them across the border to his wife, who sold them to buyers in Sudan.

British Consul Hodson in Ethiopia reported that the 1925 edict had no practical effect on slavery and slave trade conducted across the Sudanese-Ethiopian border to Tishana: the Ethiopians demanded taxes and took children of people who could not pay and enslaved them; slave raids were still conducted against villages at nighttime by bandits burning huts, killing old and enslaving young. On one occasion in March 1925, when bandits were arrested, the government soldiers confiscated the 300 captured slaves and instead divided them as slaves to their soldiers; women and children were sold for a price of $15MT in Ethiopia, and the formal anti-slavery edict of 1925 was a mere formality. In 1927, the slave trader Khojali al-Hassan, "Watawit" shaykh of Bela Shangul in Wallagi, was reported to have trafficked 13,000 slaves from Ethiopia to the Sudan via his wife Sitt Amna. In 1929, slave raids were conducted by Ethiopia in to British Kenya and slave trade were ongoing in Sudan, which contributed to British support for the foundation of the Committee of Experts on Slavery of the League of Nations.

In August 1932 the emperor founded the Slavery Department under Likamakuas Mangasha and Lej Alemayu Tene, with the task to supervise the implementation of the new anti-slavery laws and the slavery courts: all slaves were to be registered, refugee slaves were not to be persecuted, slave trade was prohibited, no one was henceforth to be born into slavery, and existing slaves were to be freed within the year of their owner's death. At this point in time, the Anti-Slavery Society estimated the number of slaves in Ethiopia to be at least two million. By December 1933 however, it was reported that the Slavery Department was de facto not working due to inefficiency, corruption and conflicts between the staff: the registration of slaves had collapsed, freed slaves had not been resettled or provided education, Lej Alemayu Tene had been arrested and the British complained about the slave raids conducted from Ethiopia across the border.

The 1936 report to the Advisory Committee of Experts on Slavery described a slave raid from Ethiopia to Sudan, but this raid was to be the last reported.

== East African slave trade ==
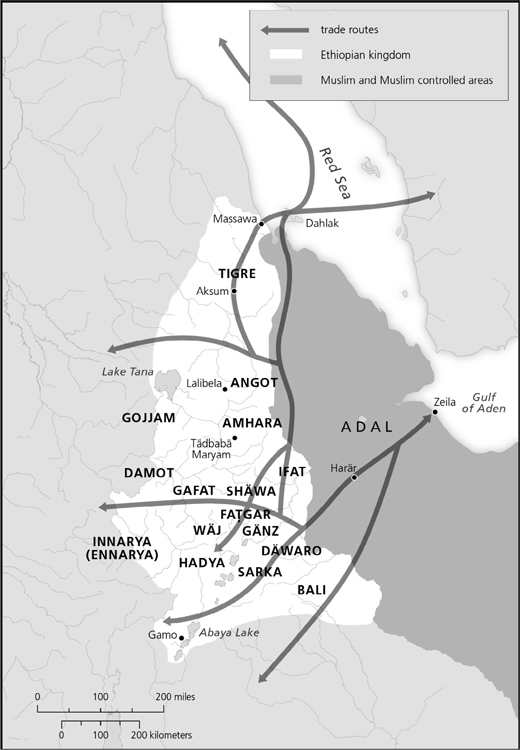
Historical routes of the Ethiopian slave trade.

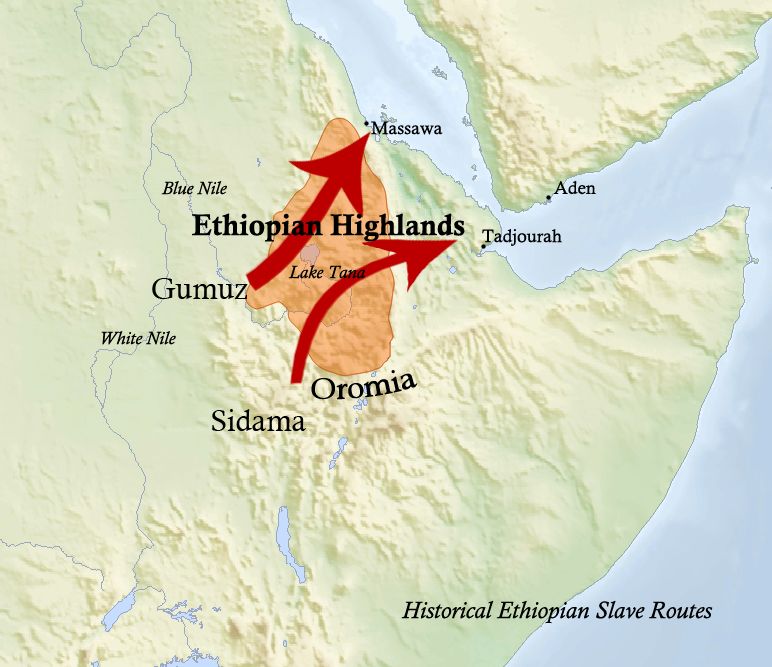
Map Slave Routes Ethiopia

According to Francisco Álvares they were much esteemed by the Arabs, who would "not let them go at any price". Arabia, Persia, India and Egypt were full of slaves from Ethiopia, specifically from the southern non-Christian provinces who, upon converting to Islam, made "very good Moors and great warriors". They were mostly domestic servants, though some served as agricultural labourers, or as herdsmen, seamen, camel drivers, masons, etc. The most fortunate of the men worked as the officials or bodyguards of the ruler and emirs, or as managers for rich merchants. Besides Javanese and Chinese girls trafficked from the Far East, young Ethiopian females were among the most valued concubines. The most beautiful ones often enjoyed a wealthy lifestyle, and became mistresses of the elite or even mothers to rulers. A small number of eunuchs were also acquired by the slave traders in the southern parts of Ethiopia. Mainly consisting of young children, they led the most privileged lives and commanded the highest prices in the Islamic global markets because of their rarity. They served in the harems of the affluent or guarded holy sites. The large numbers of slaves that were exported to Arabia was generally reflected in the dark complexion of the Tihamah population, as Umara ibn Abi al-Hasan al-Yamani commented in the 12th century: "The Arabs of Tihamah are children by black concubines, and a black skin was common to both slave and free." While originally used to refer specifically to Abyssinia, this name later became more broadly used to refer to Africans of any ethnicity. Similarly, this term for Siddis is held to be derived from the common name for the captains of the Abyssinian ships that also first delivered Siddi slaves to the subcontinent. Historian Richard M. Eaton states Habshis were initially pagans sold by Ethiopian Christians to Gujarati merchants for Indian textiles.

=== Adal Sultanate ===
Historian Ulrich Braukämper states that these works of Islamic historiography, while demonstrating the influence and military presence of the Adal sultanate in southern Ethiopia, tend to overemphasize the importance of military victories that at best led to temporary territorial control in regions such as Bale. According to Francisco Álvares, Imam Mahfuz attacked the Christian Abyssinians when they were physically weak during Lent and was able to carry off no less than 19,000 Abyssinians to which he immediately sold off to his friends in Arabia. Alvares claims that the Adalites made constant war on the Christians and sent the spoils of their battles as offerings to their allies in Mecca and Cairo. Ludovico di Varthema, who visited Zeila in 1503 wrote that the port was an immense place of traffic, especially of Ethiopian slaves. He declares:

Here are sold a very great number of slaves, which are the people of Prester John (Ethiopia) whom the Moors take in battle, and from this place they are carried into Persia, Arabia Felix, and to Mecca, Cairo and into India.

Zeila seems to have been the southernmost port frequented by Arab merchants, whose chief center for these regions, however, was Aden, where the commercial, and also the climatic conditions were more favorable. Through Zeila, and to a lesser degree Berbera, there passed the main stream of slaves from the Ethiopian hinterland.

The conquests of Imam Ahmad ibn Ibrahim al-Ghazi resulted in even more considerable numbers of Ethiopian slaves being sold to the Middle East. As a local Ethiopian chronicle states, where ever him and his men went "They carried off the young men, the maidens, boys and girls even to the extent that they sold them abroad for the task of miserable enslavement." According to Richard Pankhurst, almost all of the Ethiopians captured by Imam Ahmad were subsequently sold to foreign merchants in exchange for firearms and cannons. A Portuguese Jesuit reported that Adal managed to sell "thousands" of Abyssinian slaves to traders from across the sea such as Arabs, Turks, Persians and Indians. Among the people sold was Menas the son of Emperor Dawit II. In 1543, Emperor Gelawdewos finally defeated the army of Adal and killed its leader, with the help of a small contingent of Portuguese soldiers, Menas and two other high-ranking captives were eventually ransomed in 1544.

=== Reprisals under Gelawdewos ===
On February 1548, Emperor Gelawdewos issued an edict banning the sale of Ethiopian Christians to Arabs under the penalty of death. Arab and local Muslim merchants appear to have been particular targets, the Emperor found the idea of selling an Ethiopian Christian to an Arab Muslim so offensive that he condemned any transgressor to death. A foreign merchant was under the obligation to avoid buying a Christian. A captive could not be sold unless he or she was proven to be non-Christian. The intention of Gelawdewos was not to end trade in Christian slaves completely, but it was their export abroad which he regarded as outrageous. A Jesuit missionary reported an instance in where a Muslim merchant broke this law and was subsequently executed:

A rich Muslim trader was accused of exporting slaves from Ennarya, and on being found guilty was executed, his head being stuck on a pole in the marketplace as a warning against future lawbreakers. The emperor reiterated his opposition to the trade, declaring that anyone caught trading in slaves with either an (Arab) or a Turk would be sentenced to death and have all his property confiscated. At the same time, he summoned all his governors, the ministers of the court, and instructed them, on pain of severe penalty, to enforce the law, as God wished to protect the unfortunate Ethiopians, who, we are told, were then being transported in large numbers to Arabia, India, Cairo and Constantinople.

Gelawdewos also launched a number of campaigns into Adal territory in which he freed Christian slaves that had been seized in previous conflicts. In 1549, he marched into the region of Adal where he devoted his time freeing numerous Christian slaves and in turn enslaved countless Adalite Muslims.

=== Decline ===
After the Oromo migrations, the Ethiopian Empire had lost control over most of its pagan southern territories, allowing them to became targets for slave raiding by the local Muslims. Despite the fall of the Adal Sultanate, the Emirate of Harar most principal export remained slaves. According to Richard Pankhurst, they were virtually all from the pagan Oromo people. When slavery in the Black Sea area (the traditional source of female slaves for the Arab market) dried up, it triggered an even greater demand for Oromo female slaves, on account of their "unquestioned beauty and willing sexual temperament". Although, the export of slaves from Ethiopia to Arabia significantly declined during this period. A French agent in Arabia noted that blacks from West Africa made up the largest contingent of slaves as the traffic from Ethiopia had become very difficult. The port of Zeila significantly declined due to a reduction in the slave exports. Isenberg and Krapf found it "for the most parts in ruins" and assumed correctly that it had been formerly of great importance, although Krapf did notice a handful of Oromo slaves in the port. The main slave port of Ethiopia by the 19th century was Tadjoura, which was described as "the city of the slave merchant" and was noteworthy as the place where many slaves from the Ethiopian interior would see their "last of Africa".

Beginning in the 19th century, the British backed by their superior naval power, pursued an anti-slavery campaign along the Red Sea and contributed much to significantly reducing the export of slaves from Africa into Arabia. After the completion of the Suez Canal, abolishing the slave trade in this region was subordinated to the political imperative of safeguarding the transportation lines from the British Raj. In 1875, the Emirate of Harar would be annexed by the Khedivate of Egypt. Following the Egyptian annexation, the export of slaves from the Ethiopian interior would abruptly end, and was officially banned in 1877 after the Anglo-Egyptian Slave Trade Convention.

== Forms of slavery ==
Multiple forms of slavery and servitude have existed throughout African history, and were shaped by indigenous practices of slavery as well as the Roman institution of slavery (and the later Christian views on slavery), the Islamic institutions of slavery via the Muslim slave trade, and eventually the Atlantic slave trade. Slavery was a part of the economic structure of African societies for many centuries, although the extent varied. In Sub-Saharan Africa, the slave relationships were often complex, with rights and freedoms given to individuals held in slavery and restrictions on sale and treatment by their masters.

== Nature and characteristics ==
Slavery, as practiced within Ethiopia, differed depending on the class of slaves in question. The "Tiqur " (literally "black," with the connotation of 'dark-skinned') Shanqalla slaves in general sold for cheap. Some were assigned work in the house or field, while others were made soldiers.

On the other hand, the "Qay " (literally "light," with the connotation of 'light-skinned') Oromo and Sidama slaves had a much higher value and were carefully sorted according to occupation and age: Very young children up to the age of ten were referred to as Mamul. Their price was slightly lower than that of ten- to sixteen-year-old boys. Known as Gurbe, the latter young males were destined for training as personal servants. Oromos in particular were sought after in Arabia and many ended up there. Men in their twenties were called Kadama. Since they were deemed beyond the age of training, they sold for a slightly lower price than the Gurbe. A male's value thus decreased with age. The most esteemed and desired females were girls in their teens, who were called Wosif. The most attractive among them were destined to become wives and concubines. Older women were appraised in accordance with their ability to perform household chores as well as their strength.

== Abolition ==
Initial efforts to abolish slavery in Ethiopia go as far back as the early 1850s, when Emperor Tewodros II outlawed the slave trade in his domain, albeit without much effect. Only the presence of the British in the Red Sea resulted in any real pressure on the trade. Both Emperor Tewodros II and Emperor Yohannes IV also outlawed slavery but since all tribes were not against slavery and the fact that the country was surrounded on all sides by slave raiders and traders, it was difficult to entirely suppress this practice even by the 20th century. By the mid-1890s, Menelik was actively suppressing the trade, destroying notorious slave market towns and punishing slavers with amputation. According to Chris Prouty, Menelik prohibited slavery while it was beyond his capacity to change the mind of his people regarding this age-old practice, that was widely prevalent throughout the country.

To gain international recognition for his nation, Haile Selassie formally applied to join the League of Nations in 1919. Ethiopia's admission was initially rejected due to concerns about slavery, the slave and arms trade in the country. Italy and the United Kingdom led the nations opposing Ethiopia's admission to the League of Nations, citing slavery in Ethiopia as a primary reason for their opposition. Ethiopia was eventually admitted in 1923, after signing the Convention of St. Germain, in which they agreed to make efforts to suppress slavery. The League of Nations later appointed the Temporary Slavery Commission in 1924 to inquire into slavery around the world. Despite the apparent measures to the contrary, slavery continued to be legal in Ethiopia even with its signing of the Slavery Convention of 1926.

The abolition of slavery then became a high priority for the Haile Selassie administration which began in 1930. His policy was to announce abolition while gradually implementing it to avoid disrupting the rural economy. The main international pressure was mobilized by the West with such civil rights figures as Tekle Hawariat Tekle Mariyam spearheading the abolitionist movement while working through the League of Nations. Under the pretense of abolishing slavery (and a border incident), Italy invaded Ethiopia in 1935. Italy ignored international condemnation and demands by the League of Nations to depart. During Italian rule, the occupation government issued two laws in October 1935 and in April 1936 which abolished slavery and, freed 420,000 Ethiopian slaves. After the Italians were expelled by British forces in the East Africa Campaign (World War II), Emperor Haile Selassie returned to power and quickly abolished the actual practice in 1942.

== Legacy ==
Although slavery was abolished in the early 1940s, following a ban under Italian occupation in 1936, the effects of Ethiopia's longstanding institution lingered. Ethnic discrimination against the 'barya' or Shanqella communities in Ethiopia still exists, affecting access to political and social opportunities and resources.

Some slaves of Ethiopia or their descendants have also held the highest positions. Abraha, a former slave of a Byzantine merchant who conducted business in Adulis according to Procopius. Habte Giyorgis Dinagde and Balcha Abanefso were originally slaves taken as prisoners of war at Menelik's court who ended up becoming powerful members of the government. Especially Habte Giorgis, became war minister and first prime minister of the empire who later became king-maker of Ethiopia after Menelik's death. Ejegayehu Lema Adeyamo, mother of Emperor Menelik who actually founded modern Ethiopia, is said to be a slave. Mengistu Haile Mariam, who declared a republic and ruled Ethiopia with Marxist–Leninist ideology, is also said to be the son of a former slave.
