= Fesseha Krestos =

Ethiopian army commander in 17th century

Fesseha Krestos (lit: The joy of Christ) was an Ethiopian commander of the royal guard regiment under Iyasu I, he was one of the closest confidants of the Emperor.

== Biography ==
Fesseha is mentioned for the first time in the chronicle of Emperor Yohannes I with the title of Fitawrari in October 1677. On 15th of July (Note: Source say 15th of Hamle which is 15th of July, see Ethiopian calendar for more information.) 1682, the ailing Emperor Yohannes I made Iyasu his successor. Fesseha Krestos was among the dignitaries witnessing Yohannes I final proclamation, other notables were Kanafero and Za-Wald (both Azzaz (Note: Azzaz is a common term for civil administrator. During the 17th century Gondarine era, the term was a common one for officials whose duties were to supervise the execution of daily affairs in the various departments of the royal court. All such chiefs were called Azzaz, with some addition to this title to indicate their special function.)), basha Lesana Krestos, blattengeta Akala Krestos, and the dejazmach's Anestasyos and Delba Iyasus.

Emperor Yohannes died on 19 July 1682, and the new monarch Iyasu I, appointed Fesseha Krestos as the regent of Gojjam. He had a brief tenure, as he was summoned to return to Gondar where he was made commander of one the royal guard regiments.

In 1689, angered by the massacre of Christians by the northerly Shankellas in the Shire desert, Iyasu I despatched Fesseha, who unleashed his wrath on the Shankellas, and castrated many of them, before returning to Gondar with the trophies for his master's inspection.

In December 1692, Fesseha Krestos joined his majesty's campaign across the Mareb in modern day Eritrea against the northern Shankella tribes, and after falling into a dangerous predicament fighting the Shankellas near Batkom and Leyda, the commander escaped with his life.

In 1693, he was rewarded with the title of Dejazmach.

In March 1706, Iyasu I took a sudden decision to abdicate in favour of his elder son Tekle Haymanot I, who at the moment was in rebellion and had proclaimed himself emperor, it was precisely to Fesseha that Iyasu I entrusted his other sons to be handed to Tekle Haymanot for further confinement at the royal prison of Wehni. The fate of Fesseha, on when and which circumstances he died is not known.
