= Tekle Haymanot (d. 1755) =

18th-century Ethiopian eččäge and monk

Täklä Haymanot
- Eččäge of Däbrä Libanos
- Native name: ተክለ ሃይማኖት
- Church: Ethiopian Orthodox Tewahedo Church
- In office: 1710–1711 c. 1718/19–1724; 1728–1732/33; 1740–unknown

Personal details
- Born: Tigray, Ethiopian Empire
- Died: 24 May 1755
- Buried: Azäzo Täklä Haymanot, Azazo, Ethiopian Empire
- Denomination: Ethiopian Orthodox

Tekle Haymanot (Ge'ez: ተክለ ሃይማኖት, romanized: Täklä Haymanot; died 24 May 1755) was an Ethiopian monk and high-ranking ecclesiastical official who served on four separate occasions as eččäge, head of the monastic community of Däbrä Libanos of Shewa. He held the office in 1710–1711, approximately 1718/19–1724, 1728–1732/33, and again beginning in 1740.

Born in Tigray, Täklä Haymanot became a prominent representative of the Täwaḥədo theological party during the Christological disputes of the early eighteenth-century Gondarine period. His repeated appointments and dismissals reflected the often difficult relationship between the monks of Däbrä Libanos and the imperial court. He appears to have enjoyed a particularly close relationship with Emperor Bakaffa, while at other times he was removed from office either by emperors or by members of his own monastic community.

== Background ==
=== The office of Ichege ===
The title of Ichege (Ge'ez: እጨጌ, romanized: eččäge) was associated with the head of the monastery and monastic congregation of Däbrä Libanos of Shewa. By the early modern period, the office had become one of the most important indigenous ecclesiastical dignities in the Ethiopian kingdom.

The eččäge was closely associated with the royal court and at times resided near the emperor. The office also retained an institutional connection to the monastic community of Däbrä Libanos, whose members could play an important role in supporting or opposing an incumbent.

The position therefore stood at the intersection of ecclesiastical and royal authority. This relationship is particularly visible in Täklä Haymanot's career, during which he was repeatedly dismissed and later restored to office.

=== Däbrä Libanos at Azäzo ===
Although Täklä Haymanot was head of the community of Däbrä Libanos of Shewa, during this period the principal residence of its abbots and monks was at Azäzo, near the imperial capital of Gondar.

The original Däbrä Libanos in Shewa had been devastated during the sixteenth-century campaigns of Ahmad ibn Ibrahim al-Ghazi, while subsequent Oromo expansion into northern Shewa contributed to the movement of the monastic community northwards. The sacred tabot of St Mary associated with Däbrä Libanos was eventually established at Azäzo, where the community developed an important ecclesiastical centre closely connected with the Gondarine court.

According to the Encyclopaedia Aethiopica, the tabot remained in and around Azäzo for more than two centuries, and the area served as the home of the abbots and monks of Däbrä Libanos until its return to Shewa in 1902.

Azäzo was also used as a royal and ecclesiastical residence. During the reign of Fasilides, both the eččäge and the Ethiopian metropolitan alternated between residences at Azäzo and Gondar, although Gondar was their regular residence. Azäzo continued to serve as a residence for the eččäge through much of the eighteenth and nineteenth centuries.

== Career as eččäge ==
Täklä Haymanot served as eččäge on four separate occasions during the reigns of four successive emperors.

Term	Period	Emperor	End of tenure
First	3 April 1710 – 26 August 1711	Tewoflos	Dismissed by Tewoflos
Second	c. 1718/19 – c. 1724	Dawit III	Removed amid conflict within the Däbrä Libanos community
Third	30 October 1728 – 1732/33	Bakaffa	Dismissed under Iyasu II
Fourth	April–May 1740 – unknown	Iyasu II	End of tenure uncertain

=== First tenure, 1710–1711 ===
Täklä Haymanot was first appointed eččäge on 3 April 1710, after the office had remained vacant for approximately one year and six months.

His first tenure occurred during the reign of Emperor Tewoflos. On 26 August 1711, little more than a year after his appointment, Tewoflos dismissed him. The surviving sources do not clearly state the reason for his removal.

During periods in which he was not serving as eččäge, Täklä Haymanot appears to have spent at least some of his time at a monastery on Daga in Lake Tana.

=== Second tenure under Dawit III ===
Täklä Haymanot was restored to the office under Emperor Dawit III, probably in 1718 or 1719.

The chronology of this tenure is not entirely clear. The Encyclopaedia Aethiopica gives the period approximately as 1718/19–1724, while also noting that after his restoration he was dismissed by monks of his own community.

His tenure coincided with one of the most intense phases of the theological dispute between the Täwaḥədo and Qəbat parties within the Ethiopian Church.

== Theological controversies ==
=== Täwaḥədo and Qəbat ===
The early eighteenth-century Ethiopian Church was deeply divided by disputes concerning Christology. Among the principal theological groupings were the Täwaḥədo and Qəbat parties.

The Däbrä Libanos community at Azäzo belonged to the Täwaḥədo tendency, while Qəbat theology had significant support elsewhere, particularly in Gojjam. Täklä Haymanot supported the Täwaḥədo position, as was expected of the eččäge of the Däbrä Libanos community.

In 1720, a new metropolitan, abunä Krəstodolu, arrived in Gondar to replace the previous metropolitan, Marqos. Emperor Dawit III, who was associated with support for Qəbat, subsequently convened an ecclesiastical council involving adherents of the two positions. Krəstodolu refused to endorse the Qəbat doctrine.

=== Events of 9 April 1721 ===
On 9 April 1721, monks of Däbrä Libanos who supported the Täwaḥədo position publicly celebrated what they regarded as the victory of their doctrine. They were supported by the eččäge and the metropolitan.

The monks formed a procession and marched toward the imperial palace while singing against their theological opponents. Their songs also implied that adherents of Qəbat, including the emperor, did not profess what they considered the true faith.

The demonstrators later moved to the residence of the eččäge and continued their procession and singing. Dawit III ordered the royal Gawe troops to disperse them. The confrontation resulted in the deaths of approximately one hundred monks, including abba Niqolawos, a prominent defender of the Täwaḥədo position.

The episode illustrates the close connection between theological controversy and imperial politics at Azäzo during Täklä Haymanot's tenure.

=== Circular letter ===
A manuscript preserved in the Bavarian State Library in Munich contains evidence for Täklä Haymanot's direct involvement in contemporary doctrinal disputes.

Cod. aeth. 35 contains a circular letter attributed in the manuscript catalogue to Eččäge Täklä Haymanot. The letter is preserved on folios 141ra–b and concerns disputes regarding the nature of Christ.

According to the catalogue description, the letter was sent from Däbrä Libanos to several monasteries and refers to the spread of teachings regarded by the sender as heretical in the province of Aṣḥārā.

The text also includes an instruction indicating that the letter was to be copied into other manuscripts, suggesting that it was intended to circulate within a wider monastic network.

The document provides evidence that Täklä Haymanot's role in the theological controversies was not limited to participation in court or monastic debates, but also involved written communication with other religious institutions.

== Third tenure under Bäkaffa ==
Täklä Haymanot was appointed eččäge for a third time on 30 October 1728, during the reign of Emperor Bakaffa.

His relationship with Bäkaffa appears to have been particularly close. A manuscript cited by the Encyclopaedia Aethiopica refers to Täklä Haymanot as the emperor's "brother".

Elsa Rossignol suggests that this close relationship with the emperor may itself have contributed to tensions between Täklä Haymanot and members of the Däbrä Libanos community.

His third tenure continued until 1732 or 1733, when he was dismissed during the reign of Iyasu II.

The repeated cycle of appointment, dismissal and restoration appears to have reflected broader tensions between the monastic community of Däbrä Libanos and successive emperors.

== Fourth tenure under Iyasu II ==
Despite having previously been dismissed during Iyasu II's reign, Täklä Haymanot was again appointed eččäge in April or May 1740.

The surviving sources do not establish how long his fourth tenure lasted. He was no longer serving as eččäge at the time of his death in 1755.

The chronology of the office in the final years of his life is uncertain. Eččäge Ewostatewos is attested around 1736–1737 and again approximately from 1754/55 until 29 May 1756. He may therefore have succeeded Täklä Haymanot after his final withdrawal from office, or may already have been serving before Täklä Haymanot's death.

== Relations with the imperial court ==
Täklä Haymanot's career was closely connected with the politics of the Gondarine court.

As eččäge, he represented a powerful monastic institution while remaining in regular contact with the monarchy. The location of the Däbrä Libanos community at Azäzo placed the eččäge close to Gondar and to the imperial household.

His relationship with the monarchy varied substantially between reigns. Tewoflos dismissed him in 1711, while the reign of Dawit III saw a major confrontation between imperial troops and Täwaḥədo monks associated with the eččäge. In contrast, his relationship with Bäkaffa appears to have been particularly favourable.

Iyasu II initially removed him from office in 1732 or 1733, but later restored him in 1740.

His repeated restoration after dismissal indicates that removal from the office of eččäge did not necessarily represent permanent exclusion from ecclesiastical leadership.

== Residence on Daga ==
The chronicles cited in the Encyclopaedia Aethiopica indicate that during periods when Täklä Haymanot was not serving as eččäge, he probably lived at a monastery on Daga Island in Lake Tana.

The precise monastery in which he resided is not clearly identified in the biographical notice, and the duration of these stays is uncertain.

His association with Daga nevertheless suggests that he remained within important monastic networks even during periods when he had been removed from the leadership of Däbrä Libanos.

== Death and burial ==
Täklä Haymanot died on 24 May 1755.

The available biographical sources do not specify his place of death.

He was buried at Azäzo Täklä Haymanot, which was at that time one of the principal monasteries within the network of Däbrä Libanos.

By the time of his death he was no longer serving as eččäge. The office was probably held by Ewostatewos, although the precise chronology of the succession remains uncertain.

== Legacy ==
Täklä Haymanot's career spanned several decades of the Gondarine period and intersected with the reigns of Tewoflos, Dawit III, Bäkaffa and Iyasu II.

His repeated appointments as eččäge illustrate the complex relationship between monastic institutions and the imperial court in eighteenth-century Ethiopia. His removals and restorations also reflect tensions within the Däbrä Libanos community itself.

His involvement in the Täwaḥədo–Qəbat controversy places him among the ecclesiastical figures who participated directly in the major theological disputes of the period. The 1721 confrontation at Azäzo and the circular letter attributed to him provide evidence for both the public and written dimensions of this activity.

== See also ==
- Debre Libanos
- Ethiopian Orthodox Tewahedo Church
- Ethiopian ecclesiastical titles
- Gondarine period
- Azazo
- Tewoflos
- Dawit III
- Bakaffa
- Iyasu II
