= Demetros of Amhara =

Ethiopian governor and military commander in the 17th century

Demetros (Note: Demetros is called in various sources as Demetros of Amhara and Demyanos) was a military commander under several Emperors, from Yohannes I to Tewoflos. He was regarded as a founder of a local dynasty in his native Merhabete, from where he initiated wars of reconquest of Shewan territories against the Oromos. Under Iyasu I he was elevated to the governorship (Sahafe Lam) of Shewa.

== Biography ==
=== Background ===
Of Amhara lineage, Demetros was a native from the Shewan district of Merhabete. While most of Shewa was conquered by the Oromo invasions, Christian communities survived in his homeland of Merhabete. There were unbroken links with the empire, and the Christian regeneration took place well before the better known case of the Menz dynasty of his Shewan Amhara contemporary, Negasi Krestos.

=== Lasta campaign ===
In December 1679, after months of tensions between the crown and the region of Lasta, Emperor Yohannes I launched an punitive expedition into Lasta. On the 7th day of the campaign, the imperial forces were hindered by unfavorable weather conditions. Detached from the imperial army by the order of his majesty, dejazmach Demetros destroyed a fortress in Dabot, seizing glory that day.

On the 8th day, Demetros further distinguished himself by taking a mountain settlement called Maskot, which previous emperors and commanders failed to conquer.

=== Conflict against the Oromos - 1684 ===
In 1684, the Edju Oromos invaded Amhara, dejazmach Demetros fought alongside Emperor Iyasu I to expel them. The enemy were caught in a narrow defile, from each end of which they were attacked and slain in large numbers.

=== 1690's ===
Throughout the 1690s Demetros was a close confidant of Iyasu I, helping plan attacks on the Oromos and participating in Iyasu's campaigns. By 1693 he held the title of Sahafe Lam (Note: Sahafe Lam is an old title, associated with the governorship of a few important provinces such as Bete Amhara, Damot and Shewa.) of Shewa. By the end of the decade, however, he had lost favour at Iyasu's court. In March 1699, at the conclusion of yet another campaign against the Oromo, Iyasu stripped Demetros of his appointment as Sahafe Lam of Shewa, and reduced his territorial control to his homeland, the district of Merhabete.
