= Yeshaq Iyasu =

Proclaimed Emperor of Ethiopia in 1685

Yeshaq Iyasu was a proclaimed Emperor of Ethiopia in 1685. He claimed to be the grandson of Susenyos by a son who had fled the Empire south of the Abay before Fasilides had imprisoned all of his male relatives on Wehni, and was supported by Qegnazmach Wale of Damot, and Tabdan the Hermit of Guondj. Although Yeshaq was supported in Gojjam, the center of his power was south of the Abay in Guduru.

James Bruce states that Wale and Tabdan were motivated by religious objections to the decrees of Abuna Sinoda, while E.A. Wallis Budge writes they were enemies of Emperor Iyasu the Great. Emperor Iyasu's response was to immediately march against them, engage Yeshaq's supporters in a sudden battle that left them either dead or scattered, took the pretender captive, and had him executed. However, both the Qegnazmach and Tabdan were pardoned.
