= Hawarya Krestos =

Ethiopian noble (died 1700)

Hawarya Krestos (died 4 May 1700) was a member of the Gondarine court and royal chronicler.

== Biography ==
Hawarya Krestos belonged to the higher clergy (Liqawant (Note: Liqawant is the plural word of Liq, and it means chief, senior or a church scholar. It generally denoted a person of authority, a senior in both the spiritual and secular spheres. As men of learning, the liqawant played an important role in traditional law and the judiciary.)) in the court of the Gondarine rulers and to the royal counsellors. As such, he held the title of Azzaz. (Note: Azzaz is a common term for civil administrator. During the 17th century Gondarine era, the term was a common one for officials whose duties were to supervise the execution of daily affairs in the various departments of the royal court. All such chiefs were called Azzaz, with some addition to this title to indicate their special function.) Towards the end of the reign of Emperor Yohannes I, Hawarya Krestos was also granted the title of Tsehafi Taezaz and would author the Emperor's Chronicles. He also documented the church councils summoned by Emperor Yohannes I to resolve the doctrinal differences between the theological parties of Qabat and Tewahedo.

Yohannes I died on 19 July 1682 and Iyasu ascended the throne, with the serag masare (Note: Serag masare was one of the highest official court titles. During the Gondarine era, the serag masare was a palace official who was responsible for activities including the planning, hosting, and presiding of ceremonial events for visiting chiefs of regions and heads of monasteries and parishes, as well as coordinating logistics for the visits. He arranged itineraries for foreign dignitaries visiting Ethiopia and accompanied the emperor on all official travel. During the coronation, the serag masare took part in the coronation rituals by offering oil to the metropolitan and to invest the new emperor with the crown and royal vestments.) Malkea Krestos putting the crown on his head. The Tsehafi Taezaz's (Hawarya Krestos and Walda Haymanot) sent sealed letters to various countries to announce the death of Yohannes I, and that the reign of his son Iyasu I has begun.

On 19 January 1694, during the ceremony of Epiphany, Hawarya Krestos who was well versed in the art of church poetry, had the honour to improvise Qene (of the Mawaddes (Note: Mawaddes are a type of Qene-hymms used during various occasions. It is called Mawaddes because it celebrates the praise of God and of the saints. Mawaddes-Qene consist of two strophes. Usually, the composition of the Mawaddes is given to experienced masters of Qene.) type) for Iyasu I.
