= Atse Hezqeyas =

Proclaimed Emperor of Ethiopia from 1736 to 1737

Hezqeyas was a member of the Solomonic dynasty who was proclaimed Emperor of Ethiopia from 1736 to 1737 by a group of notables opposed to Emperor Iyasu II. Hezqeyas had been confined to the royal prison on Mount Wehni until freed by his supporters, and had little influence over the early events.

James Bruce mentions another usurper by the name of Hezqeyas, during the reign of Bakaffa. He was immediately arrested upon declaring his revolt, and a list of his supporters was found on him which led to more arrests. After a swift trial, the convicted were taken to Adababay in Gondar and slain with lances by the Emperor's bodyguard of Oromo. While Emperor Bakaffa commuted the execution of Hezqeyas to the rival having his hand cut off, nevertheless the rebel died from his punishment. The prime force behind the revolt, Ras Bitwoded Heraclius, avoided being connected with the revolt, but five days after Hezqeyas' death he was removed from his post and banished from Gondar.

== Hezqeyas' revolt ==
A group of notables (which included Ras Elias, Tensa Mamo, Gebre Luel, Mattewos, and Agne) gathered an army and on 8 December 1734 marched from their rallying site on the Qaha River to the capital city of Gondar to further Hezqeyas' claims. Emperor Iyasus' bodyguard dispersed their attack on the Royal Enclosure, but the rebels regrouped outside Gondar. Two of their number, Azmach Qerellos and Azmach Newaya Selassie, went to Wehni where they brought Hezqeyas down to the camp on the Qaha and pronounced him Emperor; meanwhile, the loyalists sent a message to general Waragna, who was pacifying a revolt in Damot.

However, it was not enough that Hezqeyas was now amongst them to carry the day, so his supporters told the people of Gondar that Iyasus had with him two Roman Catholic priests with him who had recently arrived in Ethiopia. When the Ichege and Abuna Krestodolos asked Hezqeyas how he happened to be proclaimed Emperor, he replied that it had happened because they had become careless about the true faith and allowed Catholic priests to come and live with the Emperor. This excited both the religious and the crowd to march on the Royal Enclosure and declare their intent to burn the palace down. For several days the mob attempted to carry out their threat, and despite the efforts of Billetana Gueta Wolde Leul they managed to set part of the Adenaga Palace on fire. At the same time, the rioters set fire to various parts of the capital city, including Qeddus Rafael church.

Meanwhile, Waragna received the message from the besieged loyalists at Basil Bet, to march on Gondar with every man he could muster for Tensa Mamo was in revolt; at the same time, Waragna was made governor of Yebaba, together with the districts of Elmana and Densa. The next day, he marched forth with his men; at Sima he heard that Emperor Iyasu was dead, and that same day reached Yebaba. Then he was joined by Fitawrari Tamba, who had a large following of Damots and Jawi Oromo, and, joined by Azmach Giyorgis, they marched across the Abay into Fogera. There he halted at Gilda for three days, while scouts went out to learn any news of the enemy; learning nothing, they advanced to Wainarab, whence Waragna sent his Fitawrari to Teda to set a house on fire and signal to the Emperor that he had come this far.

At this moment both sides had entered into negotiations; the loyalists were exhausted from the fighting while the rebels knew that Waragna would soon be amongst them. However, the negotiations dragged on—Bruce believes that this was the intent of Billetana Gueta Wolde Leul, so the leaders might be eliminated to prevent them from rising again—until the burning house in Teda was seen. Hezqeyas and his army retreated from Gondar towards Wogera, but Waragna caught them at Fenter on 20 January 1735. After a long day's fighting, the rebels were defeated; Hezqeyas was captured on the field of battle, while Tensa Mamo was arrested after having fled through Wogera as he was crossing the Tekezé.

In the trials that followed, Hezqeyas was first to appear. He did not deny his guilt, and was sentenced to die. Tensa Mamo claimed that he was immune to punishment because of the treaty he had negotiated before Waragna's arrival; however the judges held the treaty had not been concluded, and he was hanged on the daroo tree before the palace between two of his associates. The Ichege and Abuna were next summoned for judgment, and they plead that they had been misled into believing that the Emperor had become a Catholic and was attended on by two Catholic priests. The two men in question were produced, and proved to be two Greeks, one Petros of Rhodes and one Demetrius; at this point both religious officials begged, and received, pardon. On 28 January instead of being executed, Hezqeyas was returned to Wehni, but without being disfigured, where he ended his days.
