= Nagasi Krestos =

Ethiopian noble; ruler of Shewa (r. 1682–1703)

Nagasi Krestos (Note: Nagasi Krestos, is also spelled in various sources as Nagase Krestos Nagasse Krestos, Nagasse Kristos Warada Qal, Nagassi Krestos, Nagassi Nagassi Kristos Warada Qal, Negassie Krestos) was the ruling prince of Shewa (reigned c. 1682 — c. 1703), an important Amhara noble of Ethiopia. Nagasi succeeded to unite fragmented Amhara districts in Shewa, and launched several wars of reconquest of Shewan territories against his Oromo and Adal enemies.

== Historical context ==
In the 16th century, Christian Abyssinia was devastated after the conclusion of the long running Ethiopian–Adal War, which culminated in the defeat of the Adal Sultanate and their Ottomans backers during the Battle of Wayna Daga. The toll of the war was immense, the war ravaged Christian realm avoided near extinction. In this vulnerable state, a new threat emerged from the south, the Oromos migrated northwards and began a series of conquests into Shewa, Gurage, Welega, Bete Amhara and other areas.

Until about the end of the 16th century Shewa was an important part of the Empire of Ethiopia. The Shewan towns of Barara (precursor to Addis Abeba), Tegulet and Debre Berhan served as the capitals for a number of the Emperors and Debre Libanos was a religious centre of national importance. Shewa was almost completely lost to the Imperial authority by the end of Sarsa Dengel's reign, and de facto separated from the Gondarine kingdom during most of the 17th century. Local Shewan tradition (collected by Heruy Wolde Selassie) claims that the late 17th century rulers of some fourteen Shewan districts formally remained subjects of the Gondarine kings, but had no royal governor. Royal chronicles, however, report that Anestasyos was Sahafe Lam of Shewa under atse Iyasu I, and that the next Sahafe Lam, Demetros, initiated a series of campaigns of reconquest of Shewan territories from his native Merhabete against the Oromos.

The few Amharan families of Shewa who survived the Oromo onslaught took refuge in mountain fastnesses in the district of Menz. In course of time, the sub-division of Agancha emerged as the dominant power and a leading member of the Agancha Amhara, called Negasi, became in effect the ruler of all the Amhara families in Menz.

== Biography ==
=== Background ===
Born in the parish of Agancha in the Gera district of historical Menz province. There are several traditions about Nagasi's lineage; the official account from the Shewan dynasty (as told by Serta Wold, councillor of Negus Sahle Selassie in the 1830's and 1840's) is that he was a male line descendant of the Solomonic Emperors through abeto Yaqob, the fourth son of Lebna Dengel, who remained in Shewa. Yaqob's great-grandson, Lebsa Qal, was a wealthy landowner in Agancha, and married Senebeit (Note: Senebeit is also spelled in various sources as Sanbalt), also described as a woman of Solomonic descent. This story however was not the only contemporary version that existed at the time.

Another set of traditions collected about 1840 claims that his father was a rich landowner (by the name of Segwa Qal or Warada Qal) from Menz, and that his legitimacy to the dynasty derived from his female line. His mother, Senebeit, was related to the monarchs residing in Gondar through her father Ras Faris of Dair, "who with many other followers of Emperor Susenyos escaped into Menz." Faris's imperial descent was through his mother.

=== Chief of Menz ===
During the mid 17th century, before Nagasi's rise, the Oromo pressure lessened, and a long period of Amhara reconquest and expansion began. The Amhara came down from the mountains and up from the river valleys. Resettlement was led by a number of independent chiefs, one of the most powerful of whom was Gera, the chief and founder of Gerameder in northern Menz, one of the three renowned warriors whose names are remembered in the traditions of Menz (the other two; Lalo and Mamo also had districts named after them).

As a young man, Nagasi showed outstanding valor and skills at arms in a series of battles with the neighbouring Amhara families. Among the chieftains he defeated were Lalo and Mamo. By his battles Nagasi annexed the districts of Ajabar and Termaber to his native district of Agancha. Nagasi's ambitions was invigorated by his victories. He proclaimed himself ruling prince of Shewa, and vanquished those who disputed this claim, including the mighty Gera, in a long series of skirmishes.

Nagasi emerged as the most important Amhara chief in the area. His large following helped him to accumulate wealth. He founded the church of Kidane Mehret in Agancha where he established his base.

=== 1683 war against Arsi Oromo, and founding of Ayne town ===
In 1683, he waged war on the Oromos, south of Menz, where he achieved victory over the Arsi Oromo and removed them. Soon after Nagasi founded the town of Ayne, his temporary residence in the periphery of his control, strategically placed on the frontier between the provinces of Menz and Ifat. He built the church of St. Mary there according to the tradition of Rim (or Gassa), though it's not clear whether he gave it to individual clerics or the church as an institution.

They say, Gassa (or Rim) means a land on which we settle by chasing out the Galla with our force, power and skill. Thus Nagasi began to allot plots of land or Rim. — Adage collected by Asma Giyorgis

=== Yifat campaign ===
After fighting the Wollo and Yejju Oromo north of Menz, he subdued the Oromo living in the district of Ifat, which came to replace Menz as the center of the Shewan lordship. His further conquests included the districts of Debdabo, Mengist, Makfud, Doqaqit and Asundabe. Negasi is recognized for establishing a coalition with the Muslim leaders of Ifat in opposition to the Oromo pagan invaders. Through these he succeeded in establishing an autonomous state of Shewa by the end of 17th century. Pankhurst credits Negasi Krestos with moving the capital of Shewa to Debre Berhan from the old center in Tegulet; Nagasi's stone palace was still visible when Rochet d'Hericourt visited Debre Berhan in 1840.

In the early years of the 18th century, Nagasi travelled to Gondar to pay homage to Emperor Iyasu I, where he died of smallpox. According to Donald Levine, Nagasi was buried in the church Fit Abbo, "where his grave -- as well as the field he camped on, Nagassi Meda -- remain objects of historical interest today."

He did not succeed in obtaining the title Meridazmach, which later was unilaterally adopted by his son and heir Sebestyanos. His death away from his domain plunged Shewa into a period of disorder, and the territories he conquered reverted to their original rulers.

== Notes ==
Preceded by none	Rulers of Shewa	Succeeded by Sebestyanos
