= Akala Krestos =

Ethiopian noble (died 1685)

Akala Krestos (died 3 September 1685) was a high court administrator during the reigns of Yohannes I and Iyasu I.

He started his career during the reign of Emperor Fasilides. However it's in the year 1677 that he was mentioned as an official at the court of Yohannes I, with the title of Bagerond. By 1682 he was serving as Blattengeta.

On 15 July (Note: Source say 15th of Hamle which is 15th of July, see Ethiopian calendar for more information.) 1682, the ailing Emperor Yohannes I made Iyasu I his successor. Blattengeta Akala Krestos was among the dignitaries witnessing Yohannes I final proclamation, other notables were Kanafero and Za-Wald (both Azzaz (Note: Azzaz is a common term for civil administrator. During the 17th century Gondarine era, the term was a common one for officials whose duties were to supervise the execution of daily affairs in the various departments of the royal court. All such chiefs were called Azzaz, with some addition to this title to indicate their special function.)), basha Lesana Krestos, dejazmach's Anestasyos and Delba Iyasus, and fitawrari Fesseha Krestos.

On 20 March 1683 he was relieved from his duties. He died almost certainly in Gondar a few years later.
