= Sebestyanos =

Ethiopian noble; ruler of Shewa (r. 1703–1718)

Sebestyanos (reigned c. 1703 - c. 1718) was a ruler of Shewa, an important Amhara noble of Ethiopia. He was one of the sons of Negasi Krestos. Abir states that he ruled for 15 years, although noting that William Cornwallis claims states that he ruled for 25 years, and Rochet d'Hericourt 33.

According to Donald Levine, Sebestyanos' father, Negasi Krestos, proclaimed in his will that his oldest son Akawa would inherit his "throne". Sebestyanos would receive his spear, silver cutlass, and gilded shield. Land and money would go to his other five sons. However, drought and famine afflicted Shewa: the nobility deposed Akawa in favor of his younger son Daña. Dreading the fighting that he knew would follow, Sebestyanos fled Menz to the safety of Merhabete, where he served the governor. Meanwhile, his relatives grew dissatisfied with his brother Daña, and successfully lured Sebestyanos back to Menz, where his victories over the neighboring Oromo inevitably led him to fight his brother. He defeated Daña and proclaimed himself ruler of Menz.

Pankhurst states that during his reign Shewa clearly expanded its boundaries at the expense of their Oromo rivals. As a result, he founded a number of towns, including Doqaqit, 'Ayne, and Eyabar.

Although his father Negasi Krestos failed to gain the grant of the title of Meridazmach from Emperor Iyasus I, Sebestyanos assumed the title. He continued the conquests of his father in upper Yifat.

According to Levine, Sebestyanos died "by a curious accident". His son Qedami Qal had been rebuilding some of the churches that had been destroyed by Ahmad ibn Ibrahim, one of which was in Doqaqit dedicated to St. Michael. Part of the ceremony required the tabot in the church in 'Ayne, where his father was living, and it was secretly removed to Doqaqit. Sebestyanos understood this as an act of rebellion, and set forth to capture and discipline his son; however, in the ensuing battle one of Qedami Qal's servants accidentally killed the Meridazmach.

== Notes ==
Preceded by Negasi Krestos	Rulers of Shewa	Succeeded by Qedami Qal
