= Yeshaq =

Yeshaq, the Ethiopian and Eritrean equivalent of "Isaac," can refer to multiple people:

- Yeshaq I, Emperor of Ethiopia (r. 1414-29)
- Bahr negus Yeshaq, Bahr negus of Medri Bahri during the late 16th century
- Yeshaq Iyasu pretender to the Ethiopian throne in 1685
