= Kidane Kale =

Ethiopian noble; ruler of Shewa (r. 1718–1744)

Kidane Kale or Qedami Qal (reigned c. 1718 - c. 1744; literal meaning: "Beginning, Word"), better known as Abuye or 'Abbiye, was a Meridazmach of Shewa, an important Amhara noble of Ethiopia. He was the son of Sebestyanos. Abir states that he ruled for 25 years, although noting that William Cornwallis Harris claims he ruled for 15 years, Coulbeaux for 25 (from 1725 to 1750), and Rochet d'Hericourt for 60. His wife was Woizero Tagunestiya, daughter of Mama Rufa'el, Governor of Mamameder.

Abuye succeeded on the death of his father, and made his capital at Har Amba. Sebestyanos had died "by a curious accident", according to Levine. Abuye had been rebuilding some of the churches destroyed by Ahmad ibn Ibrahim, one of which was in Doqaqit dedicated to St. Michael. Part of the ceremony required the tabot in the church in 'Ayne, where his father was living, and it was secretly removed to Doqaqit. Sebestyanos saw this as an act of rebellion, and set forth to capture and discipline his son; however, in the ensuing battle one of Qedami Qal's servants accidentally killed the Meridazmach.

Because his father Sebestyanos refused to give homage to the Emperor of Ethiopia, shortly after Abuye came to power he was confronted with an attack by the army of Emperor Iyasus II. Although Abuye survived this threat unharmed, sources differ on the details. Abir reports one version, that intermediaries arranged an agreement where in exchange for tribute Abuye was officially invested with the title of Meridazmach; Marcus elaborates on this version, adding that Emperor Iyasu was more concerned about suppressing the Wollo Oromo "closer to his center of power. Levine notes that a second version claims that Abuye met the Imperial army and defeated it.

Abuye continued the military consolidation of the Christian principalities around him, and battling the Oromo invaders. According to Johann Ludwig Krapf, Abuye defeated the ruler of Menz, Gole, and annexed that district to Shewa. He died fighting the Karrayyu south of Ifat, and was buried in his capital Doqaqit.

== Notes ==
Preceded by Sebestyanos	Rulers of Shewa	Succeeded by Amha Iyasus
