= Semien Province =

Historical province in northwest Ethiopia

Map of the provinces of Ethiopia before 1935. (Derived from Perham, Margery (1969):The Government of Ethiopia)

Semien Province (Amharic: ሰሜን, “North”) was a historical province of northwest Ethiopia. It was located south and west of the Tekezé River, and north of Lake Tsana. It was south of Tigray Province, west of Tembien Province, and east of the Sudan. To some extent it covered the northern parts of the former Begemder and Wolkait now known as the Semien Gondar Zone. While its borders varied considerably over time. Alexander Murray include Wag as part of Semien.

Its 18th and 19th century capital was Inchetkaub, other towns were Addi Arkay, Debarq, Dabat, Derasghie, Mesfinto, Segonet and Sekota del Semien.

The highest point was Ras Dashen in the Semien Mountains.

== History ==
The first mention of the Simien Mountains comes from the Monumentum Adulitanum, an Aksumite inscription recorded by Cosmas Indicopleustes in the sixth century AD. The inscription describes the area as "inaccessible mountains covered with snow" and where soldiers walked up to their knees in snow. There is also a note in Cosmas Indicopleustes' work which states that the Simien Mountains was a place of exile for subjects condemned to banishment by the Aksumite king.

=== 16th century ===
The region was governed by Uthman b. Guhar of Adal.

=== 17th century ===
Semien was governed by members of the Amhara royalty and nobility. In 1629, Emperor Susenyos made his son Fasilides governor of Semien Province with the title of Aggafari. The title ‘‘Aggafari of Semien’’ became a normal title for the Crown Prince. Thereafter, the title became an honorific title for the governor of Semien, which came to occupy the fifth place in Ethiopian table of ranks.

Dejazmach Anestasyos, nephew of Fasilides, grandson of Susenyos, became the new governor (Aggafari) of Semien.

Yostos, the eldest son and presumptive heir of Emperor Yohannes I governed Semien before his untimely death in June 1676. His brother, Iyasu the Great, then a prince, succeeded him. Iyasu I later became the Emperor in 1682, and moved to Gondar. Iyasu's sister Eleni, a remarkable figure in Ethiopia's 17th century political history succeeded her brother as governor.

=== 18th century ===
Dejazmach Tasfa of Semien governed the region in the 18th century. His son, Ras Gebre (1771-1815) governed Semien since the early years of the Zemene Mesafint period, for more than four decades. On Amba Hay was their fortress stronghold and the main residence of the family.

=== 19th century ===
Succeeding his father Gebre, Dejazmach Haile Maryam Gebre reigned for over a decade before making the way for his son Dejazmach Wube Haile Maryam, who significantly expanded the territory of Semien by conquering the provinces of Tsegede, Welkait and eventually went east of the Tekeze to rule Tigray Province and modern day Eritrea.

Taytu Betul, empress consort to Menelik II and niece of Wube, hailed from Semien province.

=== Economic history ===
In his early 19th century writings, traveller Henry Salt noted that coarse carpets were made in Semien, from the wool and hair of sheep and goats. Semien was one of the major provinces for sheepherding. Semien itself was the object of insulting jokes by other provincials. Semenites were even ridiculed as soldiers whose shields were made of sheepskin.

According to Wallis Budge 1928 publication, Semien was known for its semi-precious stones such as turquoise, carnelian, jaspers of various colors and agates.

== See also ==
- Kingdom of Semien
- Simien Mountains
