= Iyasu I =

Emperor of Ethiopia from 1682 to 1706

Iyasu I ቀዳማዊ ዐፄ ኢያሱ
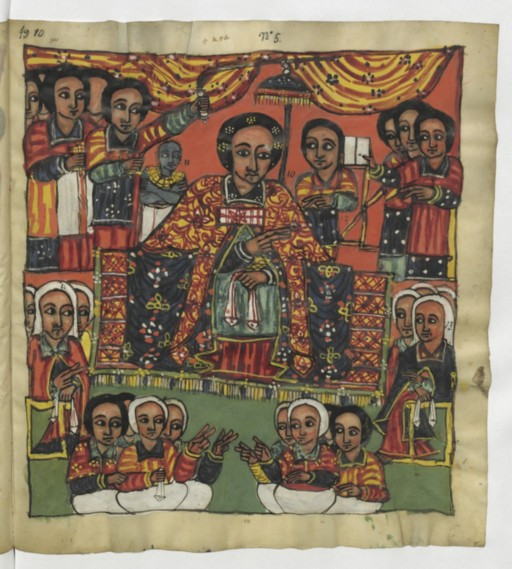
- Iyasu I with his court

Emperor of Ethiopia
- Reign: 19 July 1682 –13 October 1706
- Coronation: 19 July 1682
- Predecessor: Yohannes I
- Successor: Tekle Haymanot I
- Born: 1654
- Died: 13 October 1706 (aged 51–52)
Regnal name
- Adyam Sagad
- Dynasty: House of Solomon
- Father: Yohannes I
- Mother: Sabla Wangel
- Religion: Orthodox Tewahedo

Iyasu I (Ge'ez: ኢያሱ ፩; 1654 – 13 October 1706), throne name Adyam Sagad (Ge'ez: አድያም ሰገድ), also known as Iyasu the Great, was Emperor of Ethiopia from 19 July 1682 until his death in 1706, and a member of the Solomonic dynasty.

Described as the last “great” Gondarine monarch, Iyasu temporarily halted the trend of decline through his brilliance as a military leader, reestablishing control over rebellious vassals and conquering areas to the south of his domain. In addition to his military and political exploits, Iyasu was a patron of architecture, arts and literature. He also attempted to settle doctrinal differences within Ethiopia's Coptic Church, but without long-lasting success.

Iyasu was deposed by his own son Tekle Haymanot I in 1706 and assassinated by the relatives of one of his concubines. A series of ineffectual emperors followed and imperial power declined until the advent of Tewodros II in the middle of the nineteenth century.

== Early life ==
=== Ancestry ===
Of Amhara descent, Iyasu I was the son of Emperor Yohannes I by his wife Sabla Wangel.

Iyasu's siblings were brothers Yostos, Tewoflos and Gelawdewos, and sisters Amlakawit and Eleni.

=== Rise to the throne ===
After the death of his eldest brother Yostos in June 1676, Iyasu inherited the governorship over Semien. In 1677–1678, he accompanied his father on a military campaign against the region of Lasta.

Iyasu fell out with his father in 1681, and according to the chronicles, the prince and his followers crossed the Blue Nile At a place called Bete Walato, in Oromo occupied territory, Iyasu met a large number of his father's former subjects, the Kordidas, a largely Amhara group who wished to free themselves from Oromo rule and return to Christianity, the religion of their ancestors. The group made Iyasu promise them that if and when he came to the throne he would help them achieve this ambition. Not long after this Iyasu reconciled with his father.

On 15 July (Note: Source say 15th of Hamle which is 15 July, see Ethiopian calendar for more information.) 1682, the ailing Emperor Yohannes I made Iyasu his successor. The dignitaries witnessing Yohannes I final proclamation were Kanafero and Za-Wald (both Azzaz (Note: Azzaz is a common term for civil administrator. During the 17th century Gondarine era, the term was a common one for officials whose duties were to supervise the execution of daily affairs in the various departments of the royal court. All such chiefs were called Azzaz, with some addition to this title to indicate their special function.)), basha Lesana Krestos, blattengeta Akala Krestos, dejazmach's Anestasyos and Delba Iyasus, and fitawrari Fesseha Krestos among others.

Yohannes I died on 19 July 1682 and Iyasu ascended the throne, with the serag masare (Note: Serag masare was one of the highest official court titles. During the Gondarine era, the serag masare was a palace official who was responsible for activities including the planning, hosting, and presiding of ceremonial events for visiting chiefs of regions and heads of monasteries and parishes, as well as coordinating logistics for the visits. He arranged itineraries for foreign dignitaries visiting Ethiopia and accompanied the emperor on all official travel. During the coronation, the serag masare took part in the coronation rituals by offering oil to the metropolitan and to invest the new emperor with the crown and royal vestments.) Malkea Krestos putting the crown on his head. The Tsehafi Taezaz's Hawarya Krestos and Walda Haymanot sent sealed letters to various countries to announce the death of Yohannes I, and that the reign of his son Iyasu I has begun.

== Administrative reforms ==
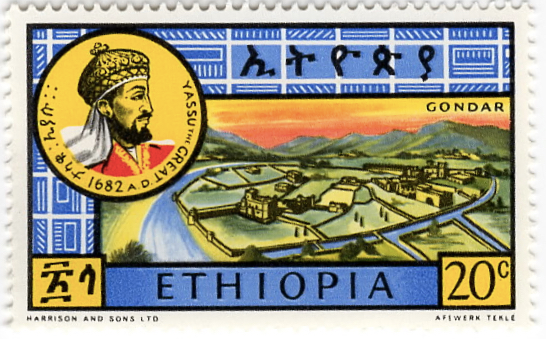
Stamp depicting Iyasu I and Gonder by modern artist Afewerk Tekle

His reign is noteworthy for the attention he devoted to administration, holding a large number of councils to settle theological and ecclesiastical matters (the first in 1684, in the public square of Gondar), matters of state, and to proclaim laws.

In the late 17th century, Iyasu I established the Lewa; the first separate armed force with police functions. Its duties were to keep public order in the towns and on the roads.

In November 1698, after reports of extortion suffered by merchants, Iyasu I summoned all scholars and rulers of Tigray from Enderta to Wogera. He asked them about the regulation of taxes then exacted at the customs posts (also known as the Kella system) (Note: A Kella is a customs post, checkpoint or toll station. The Kella system was instrumental in collecting taxes in feudal Ethiopia.). He told the Tigrayan rulers and scholars to discuss on the matter and suggest and new customs regulation and this led to decrease of taxes, and tax exemptions for small merchants, which encouraged trade. The monarch declared that anyone attempting to tax them would have his property confiscated, and be punishable by death. Iyasu I ordered the chiefs, and the location of all Tigray Kella, be announced by herald, and recorded in the royal chronicle.

== Military campaigns and conflicts ==
=== Alliances ===
Iyasu I strengthen his control over his southern domains through his alliance with two influential Amhara warlords, Demetros of Merhabete and Negasi of Menz. Having accepted the suzerainty of their northern monarch, Demetros was granted the old imperial title of Sahafe Lam while Negasi was honoured in Gondar with pomp and circumstance receiving gifts from the Emperor.

It was during his reign that individual Oromo first found service in the Imperial court. In 1704, Iyasu I settled various Oromo groups who accepted Amhara culture, adopted the Amharic language, and converted to Christianity such as the Gawe on the north bank of the Abbay as a bulwark against attacks by other hostile Oromos living south of the Abbay.

Several ethnic groups suffering from persecution and raids in Oromo occupied territories, from the Kordidas Amharas in 1681 to the Talatas in 1695, aligned themselves with Iyasu's government, in hope of securing succour from the monarch. In 1689, Iyasu's Armenian trade agent, Khodja Murad told the Dutch in Batavia that the king of Hadiya had ‘‘submitted of his own free will to the rule of Abyssinia.’’ after suffering defeats and pressures by Oromos. The chief of Hadiya ‘‘together with his entire people’’ had ‘‘embraced the Christian religion’’, and married ‘‘a certain princess from the dynasty of the Abyssinian emperors.’’

Iyasu I also had a separate squadron of soldiers from the Beta Israel and units of Wellag (Note: Wellag referred to half caste offsprings of highland Ethiopians (or Abyssinians) with the Shankella of the western lowlands. Units of Wellag soldiers are first mentioned in 1689 when they served under king Iyasu I on a military campaign.) soldiers under his command.

=== Conflicts ===
In the second year of his reign, he confronted an invasion of the Wollo Oromo into Amhara, defeating them at Melka Shimfa.

==== Campaign against the Wechales and Wollo ====
In 1684, Iyasu despatched scouts to areas under the control of Oromos. Scouts returning from Wollo Province informed Iyasu. The Emperor, after consulting his advisers, decided to proceed to Wollo. Before doing so, however, he sent his commander, Ras Anestasyos, to confront another nearby Oromo group, the Wechales, who lived west of Wollo. Iyasu then carried out his main assault on the Oromos living in Wollo, who were so terrified by the fate of the Wechales, and so afraid of passing through the latter's burning fields, that they were unable to offer any resistance. The Emperor pillaged their area, killed many of their soldiers, and seized many women, and large herds of cattle.

After Qegnazmach Wale of Damot and Tabdan the Hermit proclaimed Yeshaq emperor in his fourth year (1685), Iyasu quickly suppressed this revolt, and captured Yeshaq, then waited a year before marching beyond southern Gojjam in a punitive expedition against the Agaws who had supported the rebels.

In 1688, he led a campaign in Dera, passing through Woremo against a rebellion in the Tulama country. The leader of the rebellion, a native of Debre Werq was captured after a pitched battle in a narrow defile, and condemned by a tribunal of ecclesiastics.

==== Expedition against Gisa, Gorsi and Wambarya ====
Iyasu carried out his first expedition against the Shankella in 1688, when, advancing by way of Metekel he attacked the ‘‘Shankella town’’ of Gisa. He set fire to it, killed many of its inhabitants, and led away not a few slaves, besides numerous cattle. He proceeded to Gorsi, another ‘‘Shankella town’’, where he also captured many male and female slaves.

He advanced next to what the chronicle refers to as the ‘‘rebel country’’ of Wambarya, which had defied three previous rulers, Susenyos, Fasilides and Yohannes I. Killing two of the enemy, one with a rifle and the other with a spear, Iyasu reportedly wrought further destruction, killing many of his adversaries, and taking tremendous loot. He then crossed the Dura river, where the Shankella, on seeing the size of his forces and the number of his fire-arms, fled, and ‘‘disappeared like smoke’’.

==== King's promise ====
In 1689, Iyasu delivered on the promise he had made to the Kordidas, while still a prince years ago. The Kordidas were suffering under Oromo rule, and begged the then prince to assist their return to the Christian fold once he became Emperor. This happened when he marched south to Dara, where he took many of the Tulama Oromos prisoner. He then freed the Kordidas, no less than hundred thousand of whom, accompanied by their women and children, are reported to have entered his camp singing and dancing with joy. This figure, if correct, was truly immense in view of the country's small population at the time.

In 1692, the king undertook an expedition in the Mareb river valley, against the Dubani, or Nara, in present-day Gash Barka. At the sound of the musket, the tribesmen were terrified and fled.

In 1704, emperor Iyasu I campaigned south of Abay in the kingdom of Ennarea, where he was confronted with a civil war between two throne claimants.

His Royal Chronicle recounts how when the Ottoman Naib of Massawa attempted to levy a tax on Iyasu's goods that had landed at Massawa, he responded with a blockade of that island city until the Naib relented.

== Foreign contacts ==
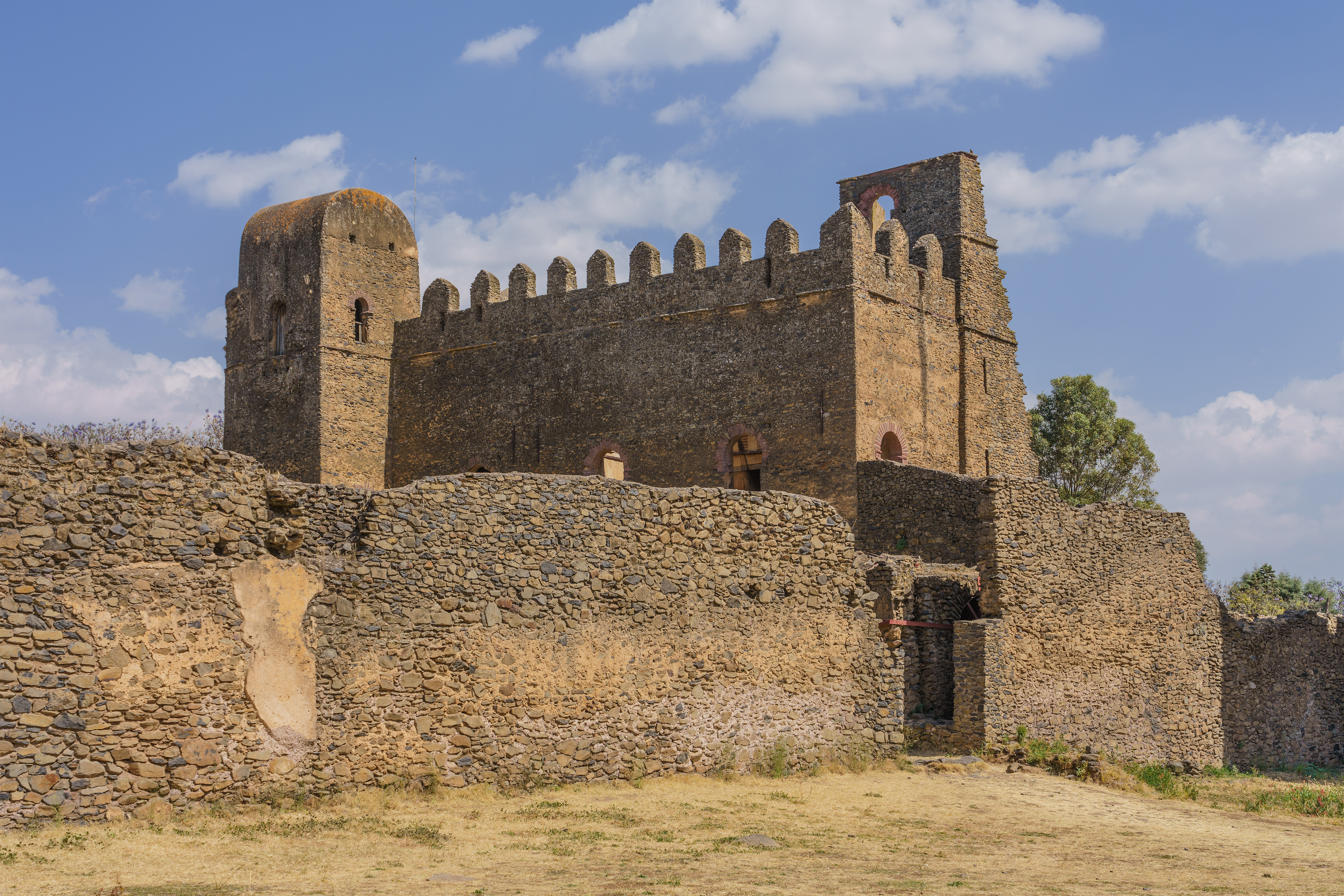
Iyasu's Palace in the Fasil Ghebbi, Gondar

Solomon Getahun observes that "unlike his immediate predecessors, Iyasu's tenure was noted for endeavors to establish diplomatic ties with Christian monarchies like Louis XIV of France and Ethiopian delegates had been sent to foreign countries."

In 1689, an embassy, led by an Armenian named Murad was sent to Batavia, Dutch East Indies. One of the benefits of these efforts was that Emperor Iyasu received a bell from Johannes Camphuys, governor of the Dutch East Indies, which was then donated to Debre Berhan Selassie Church in Gondar.

This also led to the visit by a French physician, Charles Jacques Poncet, who traveled to the Empire to treat Iyasu and one of his sons. Poncet arrived at Gondar 21 July 1699 and stayed until September 1700. Poncet published an account of his visit to Paris in 1704, which included his personal impression of Iyasu the Great:

Although' he is not above one and forty years old, yet he has already a numerous issue. He has eight princes and three princesses. The Emperor has great qualities – sagacious genius, a sweet and affable humor, and the stature of a hero. He is the most handsome man I have seen in Aethiopia. He is a lover of curious arts and sciences, but his chief passion is for war. He is brave and undaunted in battles, and always at the head of his troops. He has an extraordinary love for justice, which he administers to his subjects with great exactness; but whereas he is averse to blood, 'tis not without reluctance that he condemns a criminal [to death]. Such eminent qualities make him equally fear'd and belov'd by his subjects, who respect him even to adoration.

== Death ==
=== Concubine's death ===
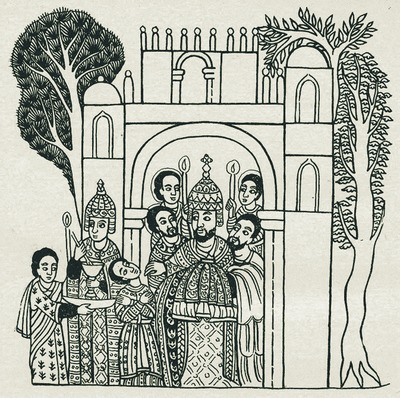
Illustration of Iyasu I from the book "Ethiopian chronicles of the XVII-XVIII centuries." (1929)

In 1705, while he was campaigning in Ennarea against the Oromo. Iyasu learned that his favorite concubine, Kedeste Kristos was suffering from a terrible illness, he abandoned his campaign and returned to Gojjam where he found her already dead. Stricken with grief, he retired to an island in Lake Tana.

=== Iyasu's assassination ===
In 1706, supported by the scheming concubine Malakotawit, some of the officials argued that he had abdicated, and crowned his son Tekle Haymanot emperor. According to some accounts, this was not Iyasu's intent, and he marched from his hermitage in Lake Tana towards to Gondar to protest this; in any case, during this time he fell sick and was assassinated at Tekle Haymanot's orders by his maternal uncles, Dermen and Pawlos.

=== Aftermath ===
Iyasu's death caused much distress in the capital, especially amongst the priests of Debre Berhan Selassie, who openly displayed his gifts to them, and mourned their dead monarch for a month. Bruce writes that Iyasu was buried on Mitraha Island, where he was shown Iyasu's body interred amongst "the bodies of all his ancestors".

Once his brother Tewoflos became Emperor, he initiated Iyasu's canonization.

== Legacy ==
=== Consequences for the Kingdom ===
The political history of Gondar after the assassination of Iyasu I is that of a fairly steady decline. The power of the monarchy was weakened by frequent coups d'etat: no fewer than twenty-five emperors were deposed in the century and a half between Iyasu I and Tewodros II.

=== Family ===
==== Spouse and concubines ====
In September 1683, Iyasu married Walatta Seyon, a native from the northern region of Hamasien, located in modern day Eritrea. They had a son and a daughter. Walatta Seyon died in May 1693. She was Iyasu's only wife by marriage.

Iyasu's numerous offspring (including four of his sons who became emperors) were children of his concubines. One of them, Malakotawit was one of the main co-conspirators behind Iyasu's abdication and later assassination. Emperor Tewoflos ordered a prosecution of all those who participated in the conspiracy against Iyasu, his brother. On 13 October 1708, Malakotawit and her brothers (Dermen and Pawlos) were executed.

Iyasu's favorite concubine was Qeddesta Krestos; (Note: Qeddesta Krestos is also spelled in various sources as Kedeste Krestos) with whom he had five children. Qeddesta was a native from Bahrkanta, a settlement near the Lake Tana shore. The cause of her death (either killed or succumbed to illness) in 1705 is disputed by the sources. It was however a turning point in Iyasu's life, and a precursor to events that led to his abdication and then murder.

Another concubine mentioned by the sources is Maryamawit (Note: Maryamawit is also called in various sources as Mamit) the mother of Emperor Bakaffa.

==== Descendants ====
- Fasilades was Iyasu's firstborn son by his official wife, Walatta Seyon. The prince was Iyasu's initial heir and was given the namesake of his great-grandfather Emperor Fasilides. The prince died prematurely in 1700.
- Walatta Rufael was his daughter by his wife, Walatta Seyon.
- Emperor Tekle Haymanot I was Iyasu's son by his concubine; Malakotawit, who later encouraged him to seize power from his father in 1706. Tekle Haymanot brief reign ended in the spring of 1708, when he was killed during a hunting expedition.
- Emperor Dawit III was his son by Qeddesta Krestos. Iyasu seemed to have later favored his son Dawit and sometime between 1698-1699 had him leave the royal prison of Wehni, a mountain fortress where all the candidate heirs to the throne were kept. From that time on Dawit accompanied him. Dawit reigned from 1716 to 1721 as Emperor.
- Emperor Yohannes II was his son by Qeddesta Krestos, Yohannes briefly assumed the throne in 1769.
- Yonathan was his third son by Qeddesta Krestos.
- Emperor Bakaffa was the son of Maryamawit, Bakaffa succeeded his half brother Dawit and reigned from 1721 to 1730.
- Yostos was Iyasu's seventh son, mother is unknown. His descendant Iyasu IV would briefly ascend the throne in the early 1830s, albeit as a figure head.
- Walatta Selassie was Iyasu's second daughter, mother is unknown.
- Walatta Israel was Iyasu's third daughter, mother is unknown. Her son was Gerazmach Iyasu, the second husband of Empress Mentewab.

== Notes ==
Regnal titles
Preceded by Yohannes I	Emperor of Ethiopia; 1682–1706	Succeeded by Tekle Haymanot I
