= Daga Island =

Island located in Lake Tana, Ethiopia

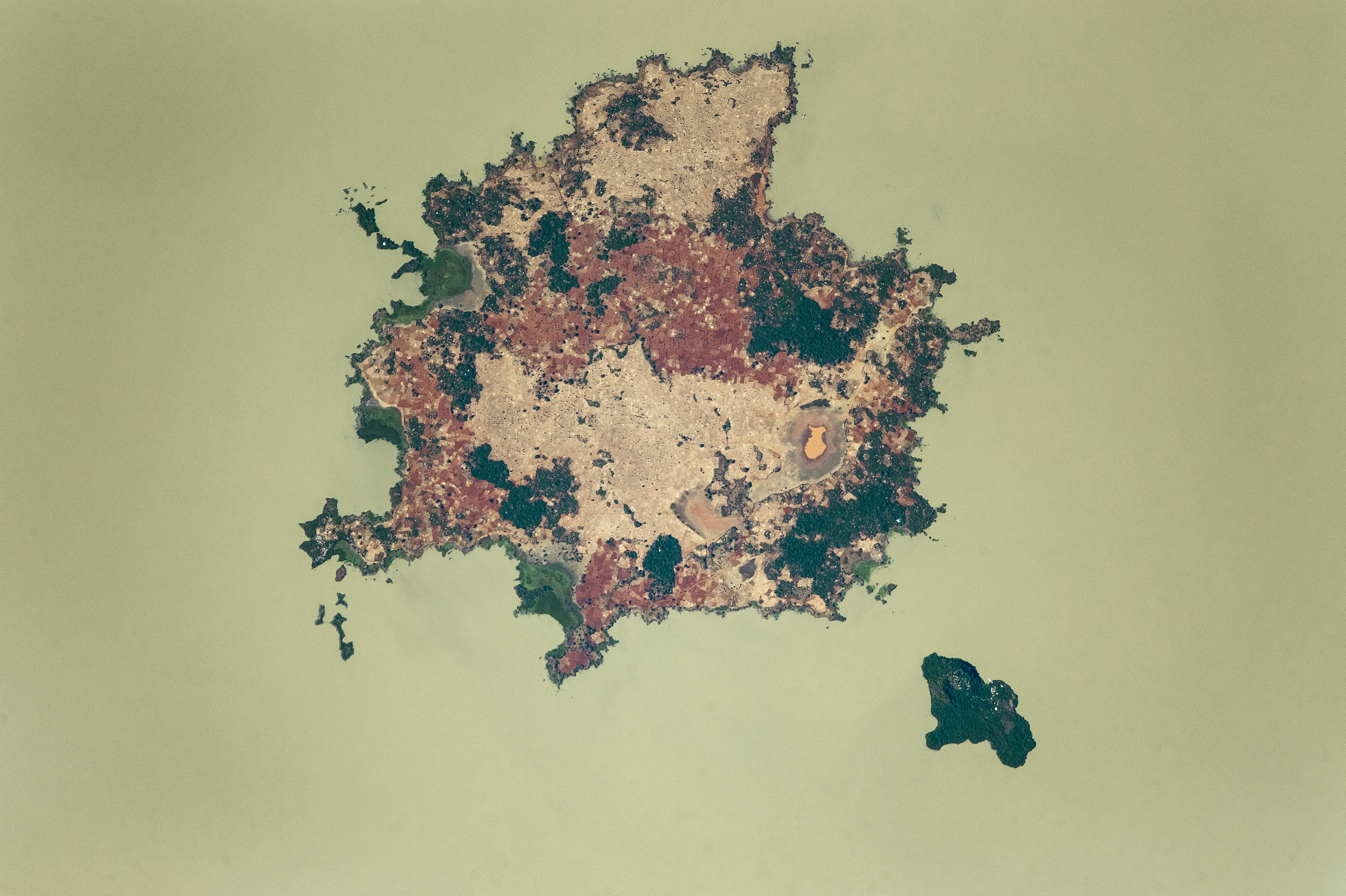
- Dek and Daga islands from ISS

- Location of Daga Island

Geography
- Location: Lake Tana
- Coordinates: 11°53′N 37°18′E
- Total islands: 1
- Highest elevation: 300 ft (90 m)

Administration
- Ethiopia

Daga Island (Amharic: ደጋ ደሴት Däga Däset) is an island located in the southeastern part of Lake Tana in Ethiopia. Southeast of the much larger Dek Island, Daga has a latitude and longitude of 11°53′N 37°18′E. The entire island, consisting of a volcanic cone some 300 feet high, is considered holy and no females, either women or farm animals, are allowed on the island.

The primary point of interest of the island is the monastery of Daga Estifanos, or "St. Stephen of Daga". When R.E. Cheesman visited the monastery 4 March 1933, he found the monks there were "the most rigid recluses of any in Abyssinia." The original church dedicated to St. Michael had been struck by lightning and burned down before his time, and was replaced by a modern rectangular one. He was allowed in the Irkbet, where church properties and books were kept, and allowed to examine them. In the back of the same building were interred the remains of several Emperors in wooden coffins placed on shelves: Yekuno Amlak, Dawit I, Zara Yaqob, Za Dengel and Fasilides, and Bakaffa.
