= Anestasyos =

Ethiopian noble (died 1688)

Anestasyos (Note: Anestasyos is also spelled in various sources as Anestayos. and Anastasius) (died 2 August 1688), was one of the most prominent figures of 17th-century Ethiopia. He held several positions during the reigns of Fasilides, Yohannes I and Iyasu I. The latter relied on Anestasyos military prowess and made him Ras Bitwoded. Over the course of his career he became the provincial governor of Amhara, Damot, Semien and Shewa.

== Biography ==
Anestasyos was the son of Ras Yolyos by princess Malakotawit, daughter of the Solomonic Amhara Emperor Susenyos. His father, Yolyos was recognized and remembered as an Orthodox Christian martyr, following Susenyos abdication and the restoration of Ethiopian Orthodox Tewahedo Church in 1632. Anestasyos therefore seemed to have been favored by his uncle, Emperor Fasilides, who was a devout Orthodox Christian. Anestasyos attained the title of Dejazmach during his reign.

During Yohannes I reign, Dejazmach Anestasyos was the governor of Semien Province with the honorific title of Aggafari. (Note: Aggafari was a honorific title for the governor of Semien Province since the first half of the 17th century. In 1629, Emperor Susenyos made his son Fasilides governor of Semien with the title of Aggafari. The title ‘‘Aggafari of Semien’’ became a normal title for the Crown Prince. Thereafter, the title became of considerable importance, which came to occupy the fifth place in Ethiopian table of ranks.) On 15 July (Note: Source say 15th of Hamle which is 15th of July, see Ethiopian calendar for more information.) 1682, the ailing Emperor Yohannes I made Iyasu his successor. Anestasyos was among the dignitaries witnessing Yohannes I final proclamation, other notables were Kanafero and Za-Wald (both Azzaz (Note: Azzaz is a common term for civil administrator. During the 17th century Gondarine era, the term was a common one for officials whose duties were to supervise the execution of daily affairs in the various departments of the royal court. All such chiefs were called Azzaz, with some addition to this title to indicate their special function.)), basha Lesana Krestos, Dejazmach Senfa Yaqob, blattengeta Akala Krestos, dejazmach Delba Iyasus and fitawrari Fesseha Krestos.

After the death of Yohannes I, he supported the ascension of prince Iyasu I to the throne in 1682 who, in turn, elevated Anestasyos to the office of Ras Bitwoded, and the governorship over Damot province, where his military skills was badly needed. Anestasyos did his best to support the young Emperor both on the battle field and in suppressing dissent. In 1683, for his faithful service, the wise and aged Anestasyos was appointed Sahafe Lam (Note: Sahafe Lam is an old title, associated with the governorship of a few important provinces such as Bete Amhara, Damot and Shewa.) of Amhara and Shewa.

In 1684, Iyasu I despatched Anestasyos, to confront the Wechales, an Oromo group, who lived west of Wollo. His forces killed a considerable number of Wechale warriors, burnt their houses and fields, seized many women as slaves, and carried off numerous cattle. The victory was so complete that the Wechales appealed for Iyasu's clemency. They declared that they were his subjects, and would serve him in any way he wished.

Anestasyos took part in the church council of 1685 and presided at the church council of 1688, where he firmly supported the Tewahedo dogma and helped much in condemning the leaders of the Qabat docterine.

On 2 August 1688, Anestasyos died and was vouchsafed a most praising epitaph (‘‘the great and good’’) by the royal chronicler. His wife Merayas was murdered shortly after by her servant Gabr whilst she was praying in the church of the Trinity; Gabr was executed. (Note: Merayas is also spelled in various sources as Emmerays).
