= Shanqella =

Amharic exonym for people with darker skin

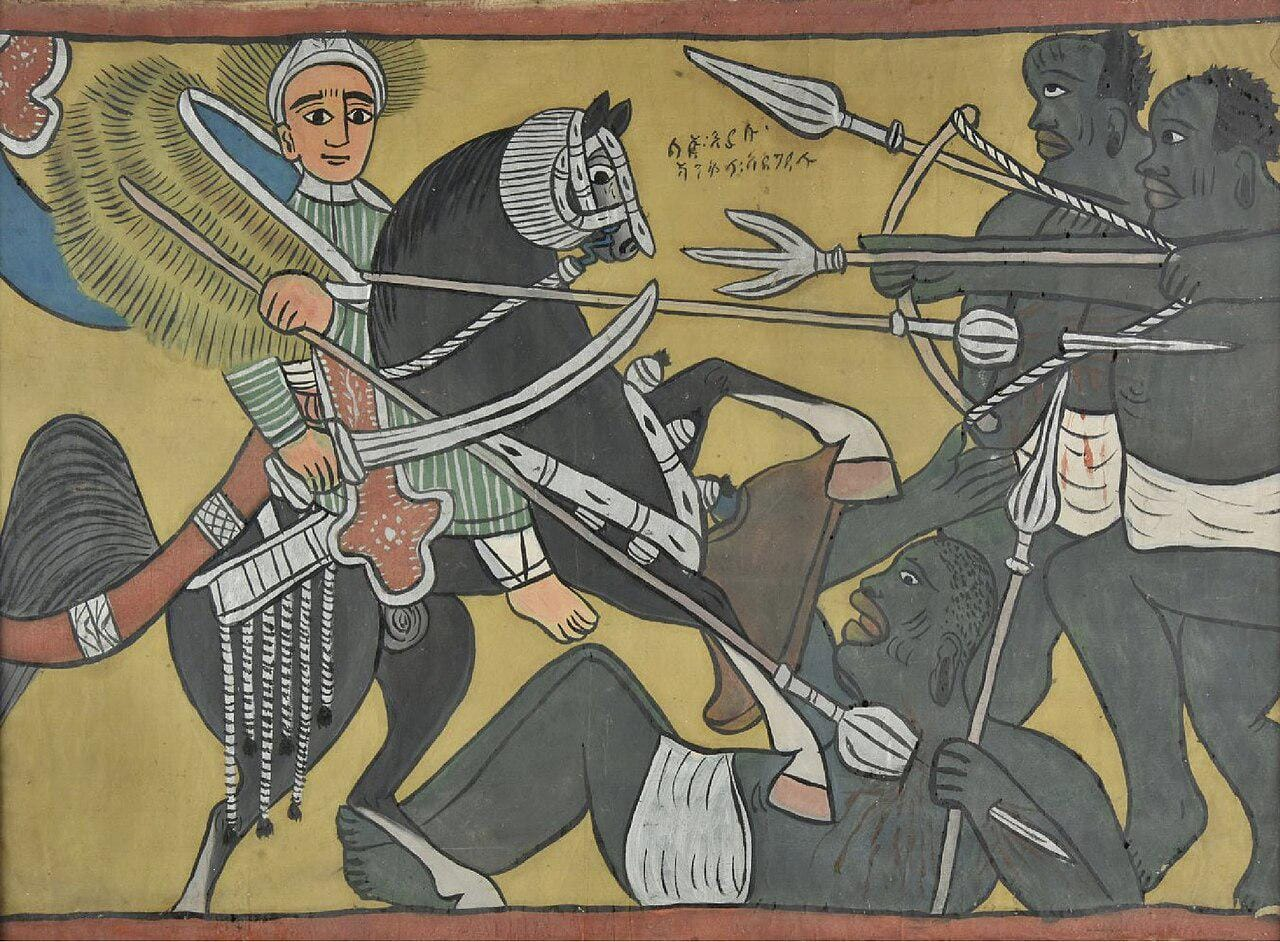
Ethiopian painting depicting Lij Iyasu in a battle against the Shanqella

Shanqella (Amharic: ሻንቅላ, šanqəlla—also spelled Shankella, Shangella, Shankalla, or Shangalla) was first the name of a single Nilotic-speaking community on Ethiopia's western frontier, but it gradually broadened into a catch-all label for many small, politically decentralized peoples who lived along the Ethiopian-Sudanese borderlands (modern Gambela and Benishangul-Gumuz regions), including the Bareya of what is now western Eritrea.

Because the Shanqella and Bareya were the two frontier communities most commonly raided, their names themselves eventually became synonyms for slave. In this way, notions of darkness and servility fused: to be visibly darker and from a loosely organized border group increasingly implied a status fit for bondage. Richard Pankhurst's survey of Aksumite and later Ethiopian records shows how highland armies—beginning with kings such as Ezana in the fourth century CE—systematically exploited this combination of political vulnerability and racialized difference, seizing "black" captives from the west and south as tribute, labor, and human property. Thus, over time, "Shanqella" and "Bareya" shifted from ethnonyms to racialized terms denoting people who were both dark and servile.

== Etymology ==
The etymology of Shanqella is uncertain. It has been suggested that the appellation may stem from an Amharic epithet meaning "black" (or darker-skinned). However, it is likely that the term is instead of more ancient, Agaw derivation given the Agaw substratum in the Amharic language.

== History ==
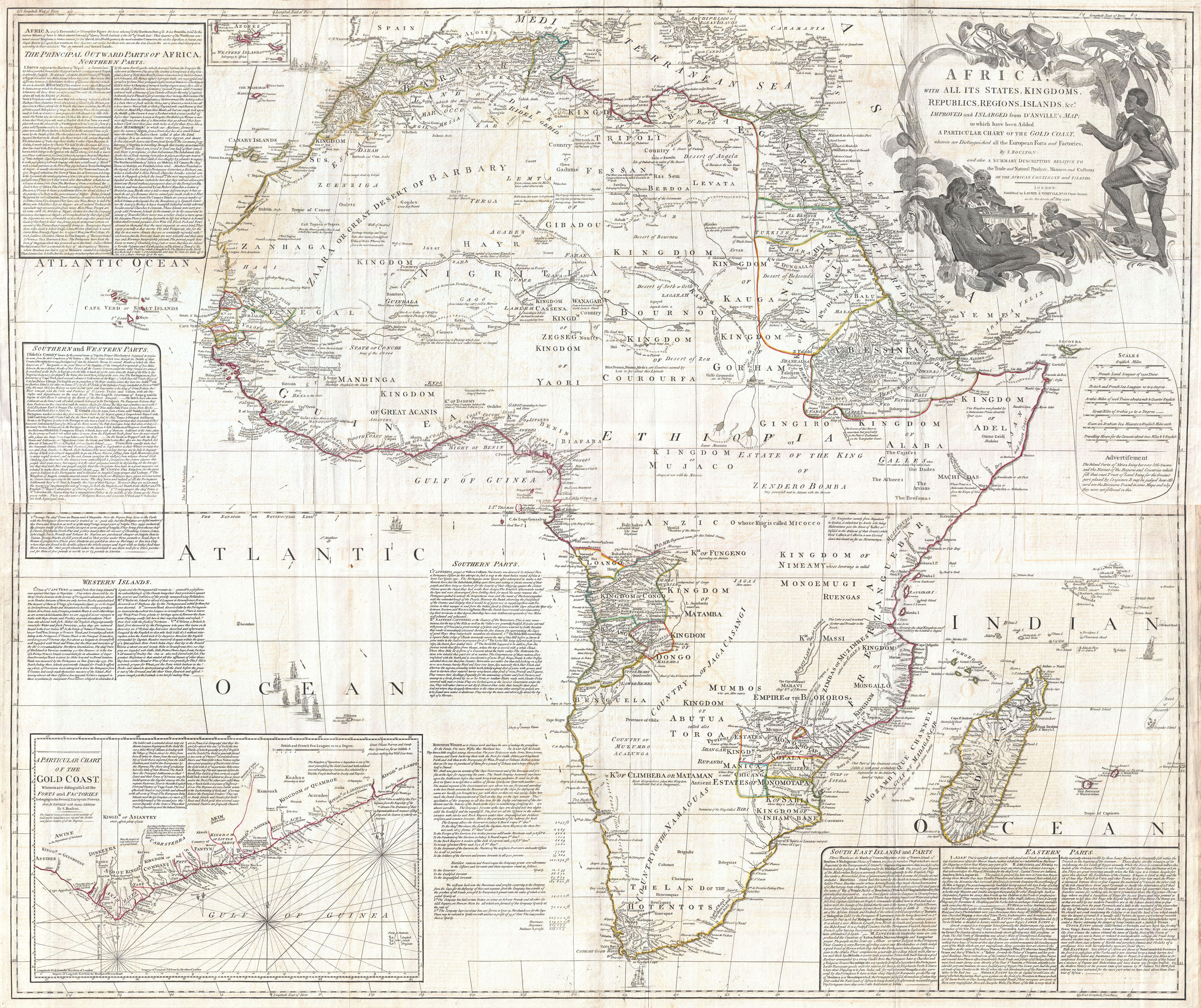
1794 Boulton and Anville Wall Map of Africa: Locates Shankala on the western fridges of Abyssinia

According to the local traditions of some of the Agaw, the original inhabitants of Agawmeder were the Shanqella (likely the Gumuz people).

The Shanqella first appear in a 15th-century praise-song for the Emperor Yeshaq I. The Shanqella are listed at the very beginning of the song when the regions and tribes of the kingdom are evoked. They praise the ruler and refer to their richness in goats (this connotes that they were primarily pastoralists). Historiography reports of Emperor Iyasu I leading campaigns against "the Shanqella" on the north-western borders of his kingdom (in this case, the Kunama people). In the 1840s, Negus Sahle Selassie included the Shanqella in his titulature. The southwards expansion of Emperor Menelik II, directed against Oromo and Kafa, and peoples further south, was also perceived as a campaign of submission of the Shanqella.

Many Shanqella were recruited into service of Menelik II. At the Emperor's coronation in 1889 it was reported by the chronicler Gebre Selassie that the monarch was flanked to right and left by Shanqella dressed in gold-embroidered tunics and velvet cloaks, and holding spears with golden sheaths. Subsequently at the Battle of Adwa, the same chronicler reports the presence of a force of Shanqella at the battle. In 1906, a group of Shanqella soldiers were stationed at Harar where they were trained by a French officer, Captain de la Guibougere.

In Ethiopian discourse, they were commonly portrayed as lacking any recognizable socio-political organization. As a result, traditional Ethiopian folk art often depicted them with grotesquely exaggerated features, casting them as brutish, dark-skinned figures engaged in profane or "unholy" rituals. With the rise of the Derg regime in the 1970s and the imposition of new administrative structures, Ethiopia entered a second phase of forced cultural transformation—one that also marked the eventual disappearance of the term Shanqella from official and popular discourse.

== See also ==
- Tukrir, Ethiopian term for persons of West or Central African origin.
