= Yohannes I =

Emperor of Ethiopia from 1667 to 1682

Yohannes I ቀዳማዊ ዐፄ ዮሐንስ
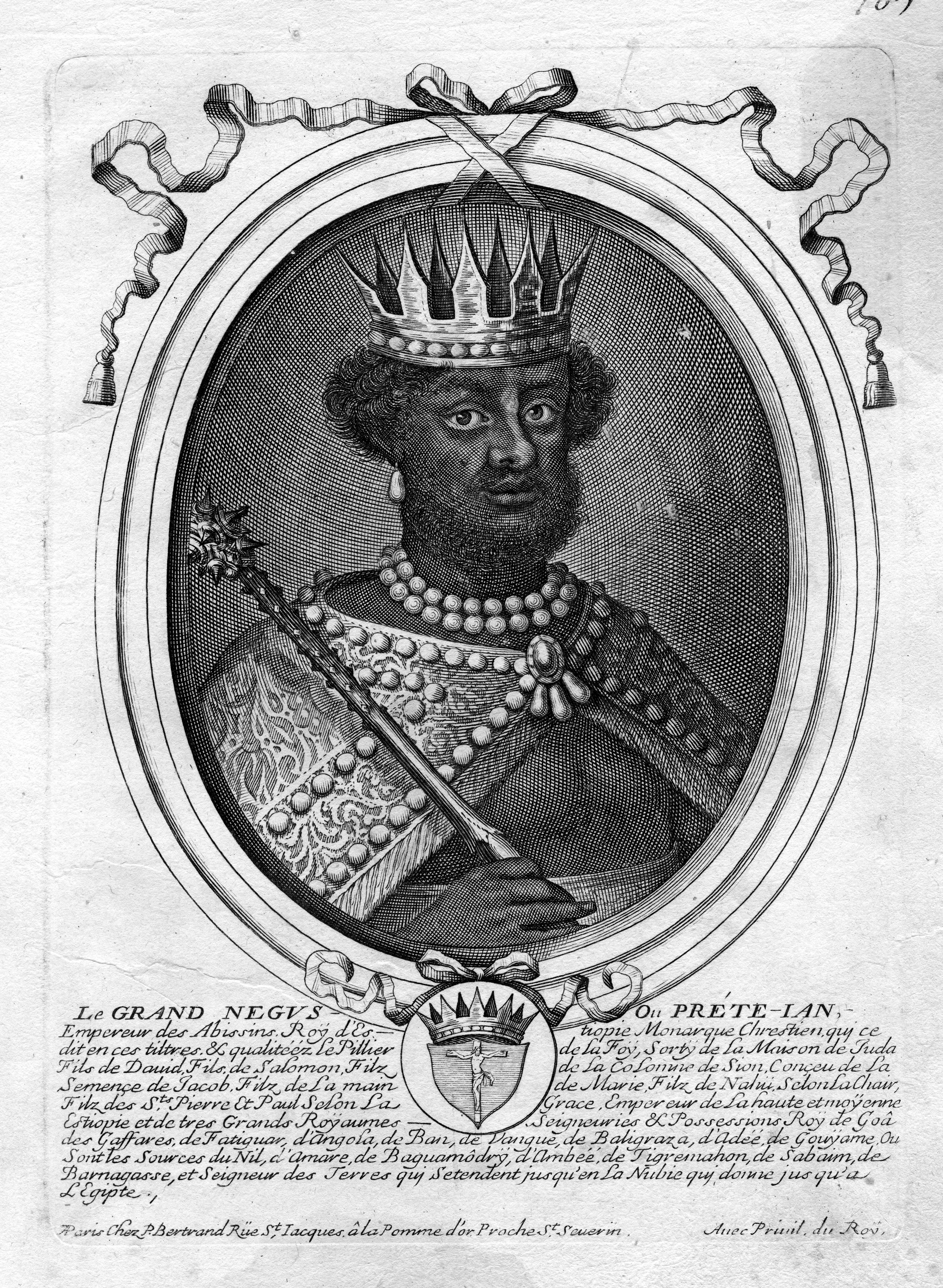
- Yohannes I as depicted on a French engraving

Emperor of Ethiopia
- Reign: 18 October 1667 – 19 July 1682
- Predecessor: Fasilides
- Successor: Iyasu I
- Born: c. 1640
- Died: 19 July 1682 (aged 41–42)
- Consort: Sabla Wangel
- Issue: 5 sons including Iyasu I and 2 daughters.
Regnal name
- A'ilaf Sagad
- House: House of Solomon
- Father: Fasilides
- Religion: Orthodox Tewahedo

Yohannes I (Ge'ez: ቀዳማዊ ዮሐንስ), also known as Yohannes the Righteous (Ge'ez: ጻድቁ ዮሐንስ), throne name A'ilaf Sagad (Ge'ez: አእላፍ ሰገድ; c. 1640 – 19 July 1682) was Emperor of Ethiopia from 1667 to 1682, and a member of the Solomonic dynasty. He was the fourth son of Fasilides.

Yohannes was appointed nəgusä nägäst by a council of the senior dignitaries of the Empire, at the encouragement of the noble Blattengeta Malka Krestos. The council then imprisoned the other sons of Fasilides on Mount Wehni, continuing the practice Fasilides had revived.

== Ancestry ==
Yohannes was of Amhara heritage and the eldest son of Emperor Fasilides. He succeeded his father in 1662.

== Reign ==
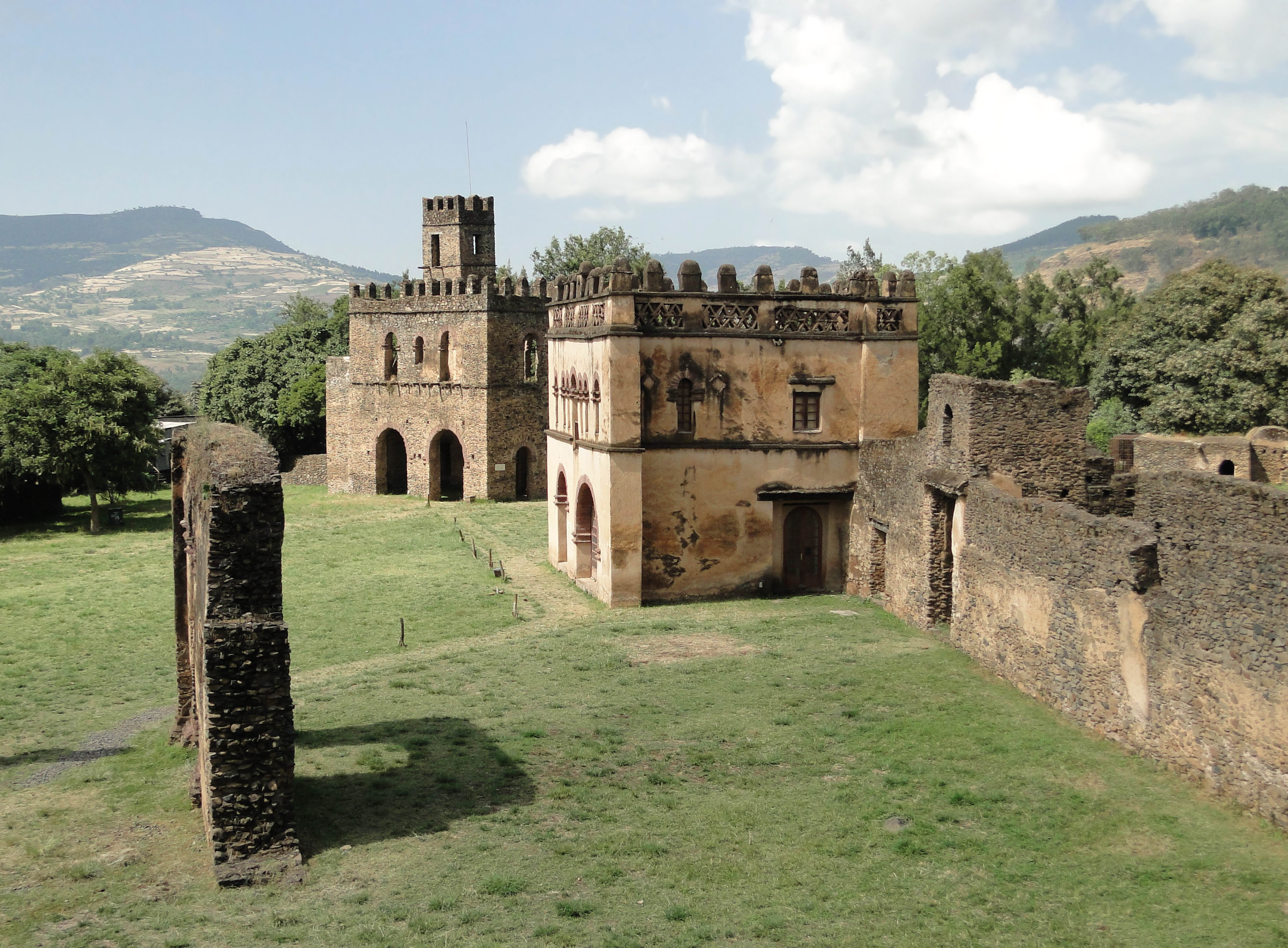
Library and Chancellery of Yohannes I in the Fasil Ghebbi, Gondar, Ethiopia.

According to G.W.B. Huntingford, Yohannes spent much of his reign campaigning, stating that 6 of the 11 itineraries he reproduced were military expeditions. Three of these were against the Agaw in Gojjam, and Agawmeder, one against the Oromo, and two punitive expeditions to the area around Mount Ashgwagwa—Angot and Lasta—to quash the revolts of Feres (in 1677) and Za Maryam (1679).

On 15 July (Note: Source say 15th of Hamle which is 15th of July, see Ethiopian calendar for more information.) 1682, the ailing Emperor Yohannes I made Iyasu I his successor in his final proclamation. The dignitaries witnessing this proclamation were the Blattengeta Akala Krestos, Dejazmach Anestasyos, Delba Iyasus, Fitawrari Fesseha Krestos, Azazz Kanafero, Basha Lesana Krestos and Azazz Za-Wald among others.

Emperor Yohannes died on 19 July and was buried at Teda.

== Religion under Yohannes ==
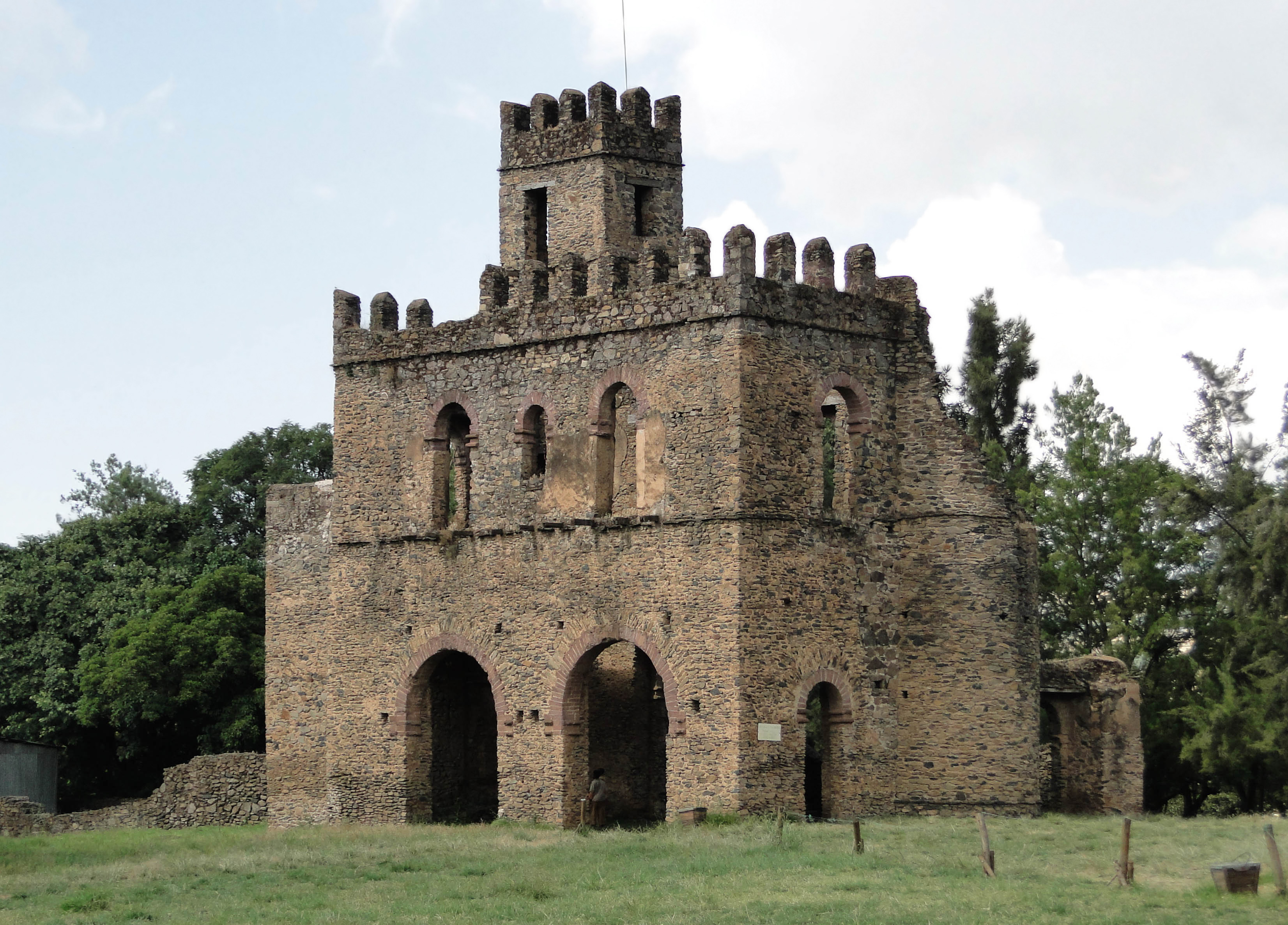
Chancellery of Yohannes I in Gondar, Amhara Region.

Due to the violent religious controversy that Catholic missionaries had caused in Ethiopia under the reign of his grandfather Susenyos, Yohannes acted harshly towards Europeans. In 1669, he directed Gerazmach Mikael to expel all of the Catholics still living in Ethiopia; those who did not embrace the beliefs of the Ethiopian Church were exiled to Sennar. Six Franciscans sent by Pope Alexander VII to succeed in converting Ethiopia to Catholicism where the Jesuits had failed 30 years before, were executed during his reign. As a result, he favored Armenian visitors, whose beliefs also embraced Miaphysitism, and were in harmony with the Ethiopian Church. These included Khodja Murad, who undertook a number of diplomatic missions for the Emperor; and in 1679, the Emperor Yohannes received the Armenian bishop Yohannes, bearing a relic of Ewostatewos.

The growing controversy over the nature of Christ had grown severe enough that in the last year of his reign Yohannes called a synod to resolve the dispute. The Ewostathian monks of Gojjam advocated the formula "Through Unction Christ the Son was consubstantial with the Father", by which they came to be known as the Qebat ("Unction") faction, who were supported by the Emperor's own son Iyasu; they were opposed by the monks of Debre Libanos, who at that time still advocated traditional Miaphysitism. The outcome of the synod is in dispute: according to E.A. Wallis-Budge and H. Weld Blundell, Emperor Yohannes was convinced to condemn the Qebat doctrine, which led to Iyasu attempting to flee his father's realm; but according to Crummey, Yohannes favored the Gojjame delegation for political reasons: at the time Gojjam was an important province. These decisions were revisited once Iyasu became Emperor, at a synod he called in 1686.

== Family ==
=== Spouse ===
Sources mentions only Sabla Wangel as the spouse of Emperor Yohannes I. She married Yohannes in October 1668 and likely gave birth to all (or almost all (Note: Only Eleni is uncertain. Sources mention Eleni as a daughter of Yohannes I, and sister of Iyasu I, but does not mention the mother.)) of his offsprings. The marriage was dissolved in 1678 by the order of the Abun of Alexandria, on the grounds that it was incestuous. Sabla Wangel's father was Gabra Maskal (Note: Abeto Gabra Maskal is in various sources also spelled as Gabra Masqal), the husband of Yohannes's paternal aunt, and therefore Sabla Wangel was a niece of Yohannes.

Nonetheless, the former empress is remembered as a ‘‘great patroness of literature’’ who was knowledgeable about theological books and supported the production of manuscripts. Sabla Wangel died on 13 January 1690 and was buried as a queen in the royal cemetery on the island of Mesrasha at Lake Tana alongside Yohannes I.

=== Descendants ===
Emperor Yohannes I had 5 sons (four of whom were named in sources), and 2 daughters.

- Yostos was his eldest son. He served as the governor of Semien. He died on 11 June 1676.
- Iyasu the Great was his second son and successor.
- Tewoflos was his third son. Tewoflos reigned as Emperor between 1708 and 1711.
- Gelawdewos was his fourth son. Gelawdewos died after being struck by lightning, and was buried on the island of Mesrasha on Lake Tana.
- Amlakawit was his eldest daughter. She married Basha Walda Giyorgis, a powerful retainer under Yohannes I. Amlakawit died young in 1669.
- Eleni his second daughter of Yohannes I; her mother is not named in the sources. She was one of the most influential woman of late 17th century Ethiopia. She died in 1708.

== Notes ==
Regnal titles
Preceded by Fasilides	Emperor of Ethiopia; 1667–1682	Succeeded by Iyasu I
