= Wehni =

Mountainous place in Ethiopia, where heirs of emperor interned temporarily

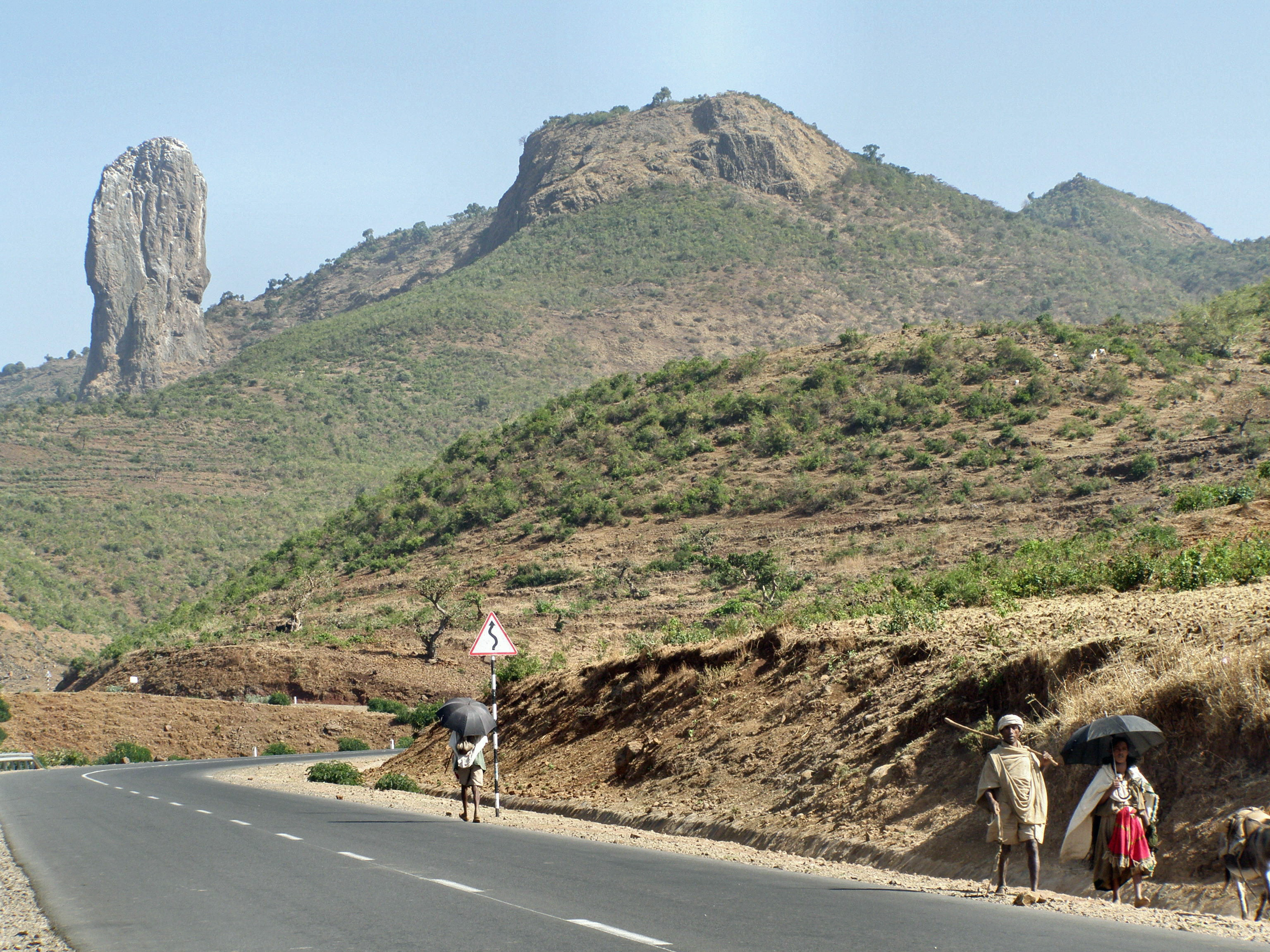
- Mount Wehni, on the left

Highest point
- Coordinates: 12°08′54″N 37°45′59″E

Geography
- Location within Ethiopia
- Location: Amhara Region, Ethiopia

Wehni (Amharic: ወህኒ) is the name of one of the mountains of Ethiopia where most of the male heirs to the Emperor of Ethiopia were interned, usually for life. It was the last of the three such mountains, or amba, said to have been used for that purpose, the other two being Debre Damo and Amba Geshen.

From some undetermined time in history, it was the custom that when the Emperor assumed the throne, his brothers and other male relatives would be taken to a royal prison, where they would live until either they were called forth to become the new emperor or died. Mount Wehni was first used as a prison by Fasilides, when he exiled his son Dawit there for leading a revolt. The mountain was abandoned as a prison during the Zemene Mesafint; more precisely in the 1790s, as Samuel Gobat learned from one Tekla Selassie, "a relative of the king" (that is, the Emperor of Ethiopia).

Although James Bruce first mentions the existence of the royal prison at Wehni, Thomas Pakenham was the first European to visit the site, in 1955. He notes that when he started to search for this half-forgotten complex, there were three possible locations for the prison in the province of Begemder, now part of the Amhara Region of Ethiopia: the Ethiopian expert Steven Wright believed it lay three days' journey to the west of Gondar; a Colonel Shifferaw, who was familiar with the area, knew of two locations to the east of Gondar. Pakenham's explorations determined that it lay in the mountains to the northeast of Emfraz, and he recorded his first clear view of it:

In the docile plain there opened a gorge perhaps half a mile wide, leading to a bowl-shaped valley. It was the valley of Wehni. From the centre rose the scoriated black thumb that was the Mountain. It was in fact twice the height it had first appeared, its sides perfectly sheer to the ground, its top flat and grassy.

Pakenham found at the foot of the mountain a village that "hardly deserved the name". Although he found the inhabitants "wretched and poor", inspecting the local church he found a number of paintings that he dated to the 17th century, "fifty years after Fasil in fact, but were exciting evidence of the importance of Wehni at the time. Though the church and village were now so dilapidated, it was obvious that once they had enjoyed royal patronage as munificent as Gondar itself."

Unfortunately, a landslide at some point in the previous 30 years made Pakenham unable to ascend Mount Wehni. Equipped with climbing gear, he made an unsuccessful second attempt a few months later. He concludes his account of travels in Ethiopia with a description of the compound at the top of the mountain, viewed from the air, after he had convinced the pilot of the Gondar-Addis Ababa flight to pass by and circle the peak.

Travel writer Barbara Toy was the first Westerner to set foot on the top of Wehni, which she accessed in 1959 by helicopter. She camped overnight on the mountain, and wrote about her time in Ethiopia in her 1961 book In Search of Sheba: Across the Sahara to Ethiopia, published by John Murray.

Mount Wehni was climbed in 2002 by members of the HotRock round the world climbing expedition. It was chronicled in the book The Reluctant Traveller by Bill Lumley, who joined HotRock for the Ethiopian leg of the journey.

This royal prison at the top of Wehni left its influence on English literature by the accounts of Bruce and inspired the setting of Dr. Samuel Johnson's narrative The History of Rasselas, Prince of Abissinia.
