= Simien Mountains National Park =

National park in Ethiopia

- IUCN category II (national park)
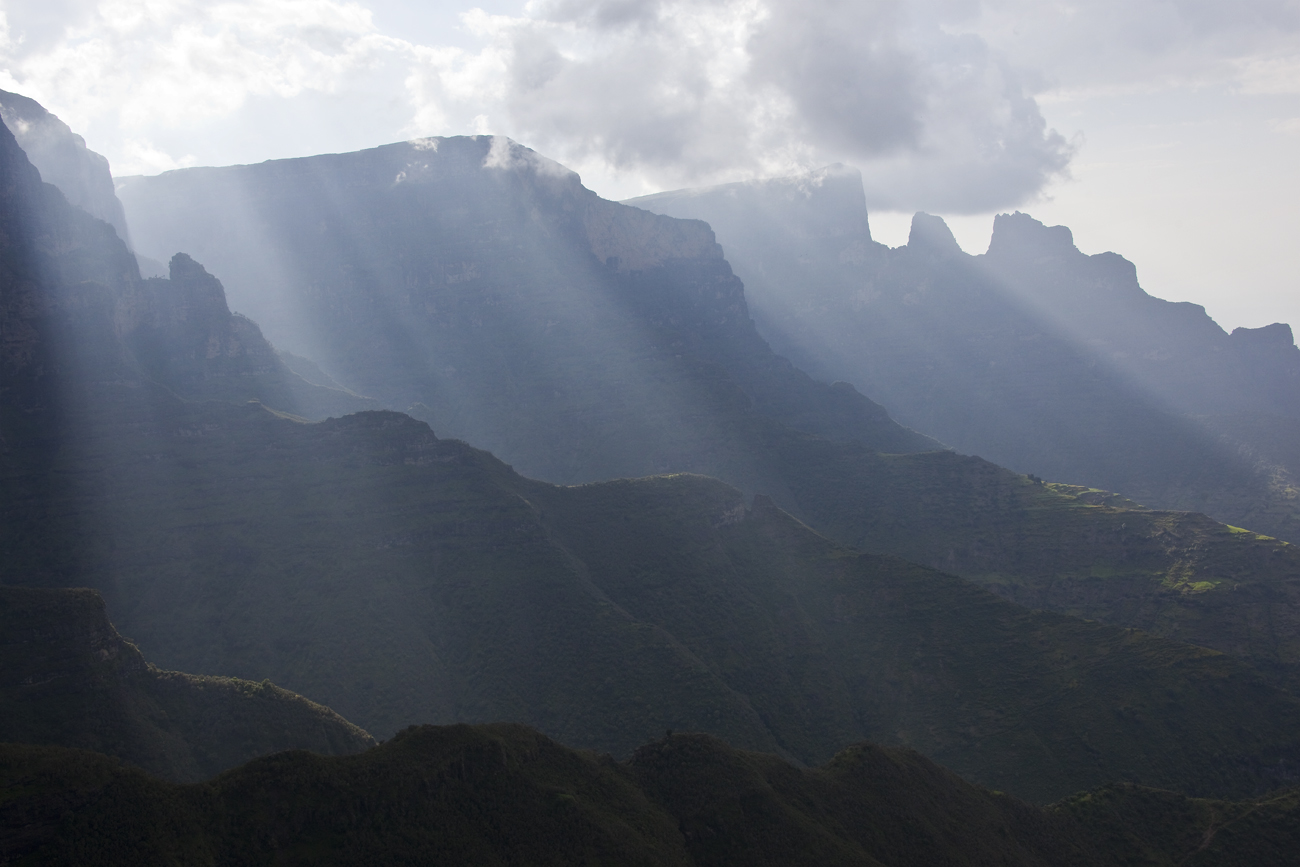
- Simien Mountains

- Location within Ethiopia
- Location: Amhara Region, Ethiopia
- Nearest city: Debarq and Mekane Berhan
- Coordinates: 13°11′N 38°4′E
- Area: 412 km^{2} (159 sq mi)
- Established: 1969
- Visitors: 26,000 (in 2016)
- Governing body: Ethiopian Wildlife Conservation Authority

UNESCO World Heritage Site
- Official name: Simien National Park
- Type: Natural
- Criteria: vii, x
- Designated: 1978 (2nd session)
- Reference no.: 9
- Region: Africa
- Endangered: 1996–2017

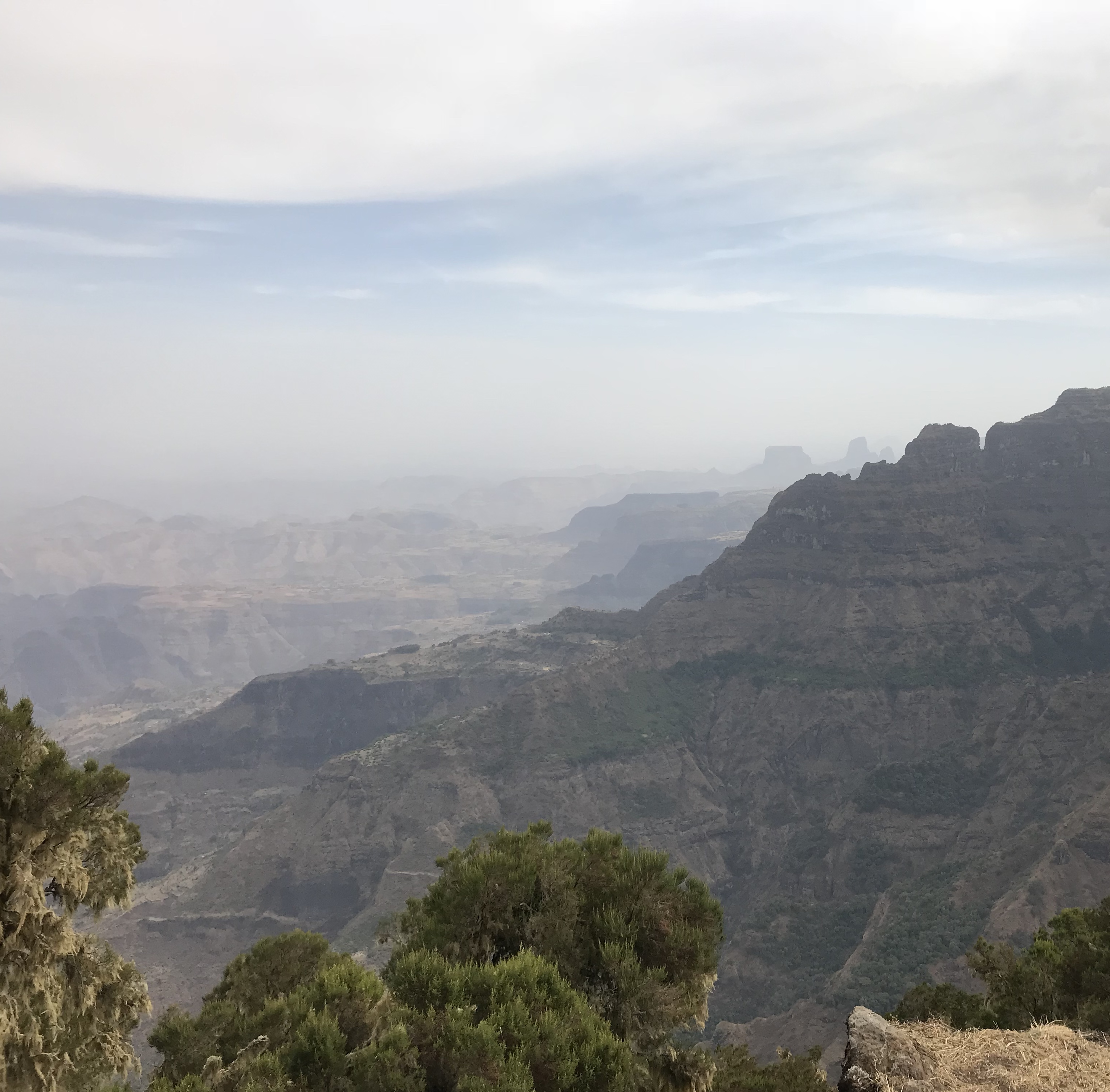
Simien National Park

Simien Mountains National Park is the largest national park in Ethiopia. Located in the North Gondar Zone of the Amhara Region, its territory covers the highest parts of the Simien Mountains and includes Ras Dashan, the highest point in Ethiopia.

It is home to a number of endangered species, including the Ethiopian wolf and the walia ibex, a wild goat found nowhere else in the world. The gelada baboon and the caracal, a cat, also occur within the Simien Mountains. More than 50 species of birds inhabit the park, including the bearded vulture, or lammergeier, with its 3-metre (10 ft) wingspan.

The park is crossed by an unpaved road which runs from Debarq, where the administrative headquarters of the park is located, east through a number of villages to the 4,430 metres (14,530 ft) Buahit Pass, where the road turns south to end at Mekane Berhan, 10 kilometres (6 mi) beyond the park boundary.

== History ==
The park was established in 1969, having been set up by Clive Nicol, who wrote about his experiences in From the Roof of Africa (1971, ISBN 0 340 14755 5).

The Simien region has been inhabited and cultivated for at least 2,000 years, initially erosion began to reveal that the clearing began at the gentle slope of the highland valley but later expanded to a steep slope.

The national park was one of the first sites to be made a World Heritage Site by UNESCO, inscribed in 1978 because of its outstanding biodiversity and spectacular landscape. Due to serious population declines of some of its characteristic native species, in 1996 it was added to the List of World Heritage in Danger. With the stabilization of those species' populations, this listing was removed in 2017.

== Geography ==
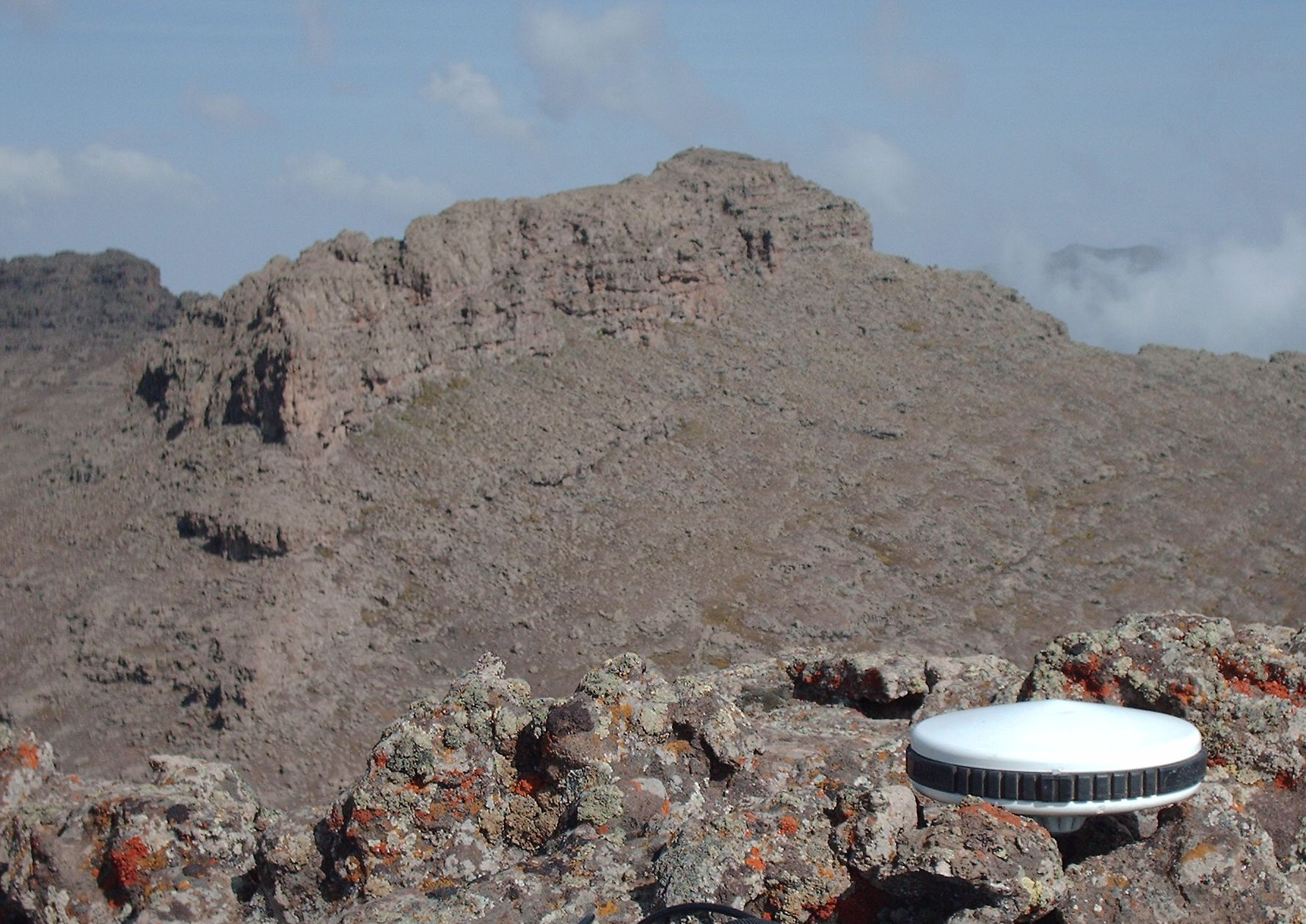
Mount Ras Dashen, the highest peak of Ethiopia

Simien Mountains National Park is located on the western side of the Simien Mountains and is 120 kilometres (75 mi) from the Gondar province of Begemder in the northwestern part of Ethiopia. It is located within the Simien Massif, which rises above the northern highlands of Ethiopia. The highlands were formed by volcanic flood basalts dating from the Paleogene period roughly 30 million years ago. The massif itself is the remnant of a large shield volcano. Over millions of years due to the heavy erosion of the Ethiopian plateau serrated mountain peaks, deep valleys and 1,500 metre high sheer cliffs have been created, creating some of the most spectacular scenery in the world.

The Simien area is rich in perforated basalt, and serves as an ideal catchment basin. Water is conserved by the Mayshasha River, which runs through the two rainy seasons, and the national park from north to south. As a result, national parks are abundant with wildlife and plants.

== Wildlife ==
=== Flora ===
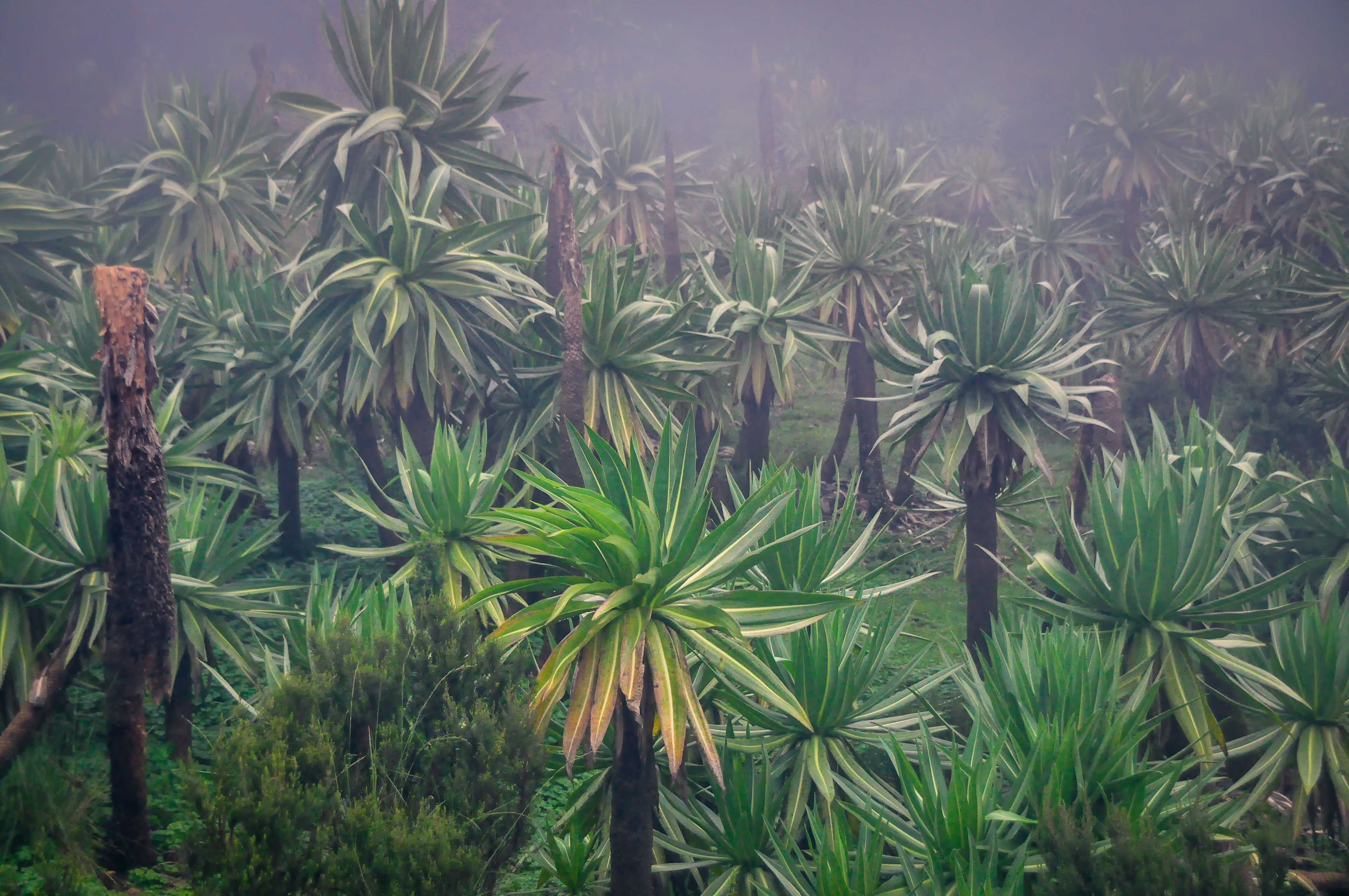
Giant lobelias, endemic to afroalpine areas of the Simien Mountains

The vegetation is mixed with African alpine forests, wilderness forests and alpine vegetation. High altitude areas include montane savannah and tree heath (Erica arborea), giant lobelia (Lobelia rhynchopetalum), yellow primrose (Primula verticillata), everlastings (Helichrysum spp.), a lady's mantle (Alchemilla spp.), and a moss (Grimmiaceae spp.). Lichen covers the trees of the alpine area. Vegetation throughout the park is divided into three sections, montane forest (1900–3000m), ericaceous belt or subafroalpine (2700–3700m) and the afroalpine (3700–5433m). Within the montane forest there are juniper trees (Juniperus procera), African redwood (Hagenia abyssinica), African olive (Olea africana), fig (Ficus spp), and waterberry (Syzygium guineense). There are also many varieties of shrubs including cocona (Solanum sessilistellatum), Abyssinian rose (Rosa abyssinica), cowslip (Primula verticillata), and stinging nettle (Urtica spp.). The ridges and canyons have scattered meadows, forests and bushes. At one time, the St. John's wort (Hypericum spp.) Forests grew from 3,000 to 3,800 m above sea level, but are now almost gone.

=== Fauna ===
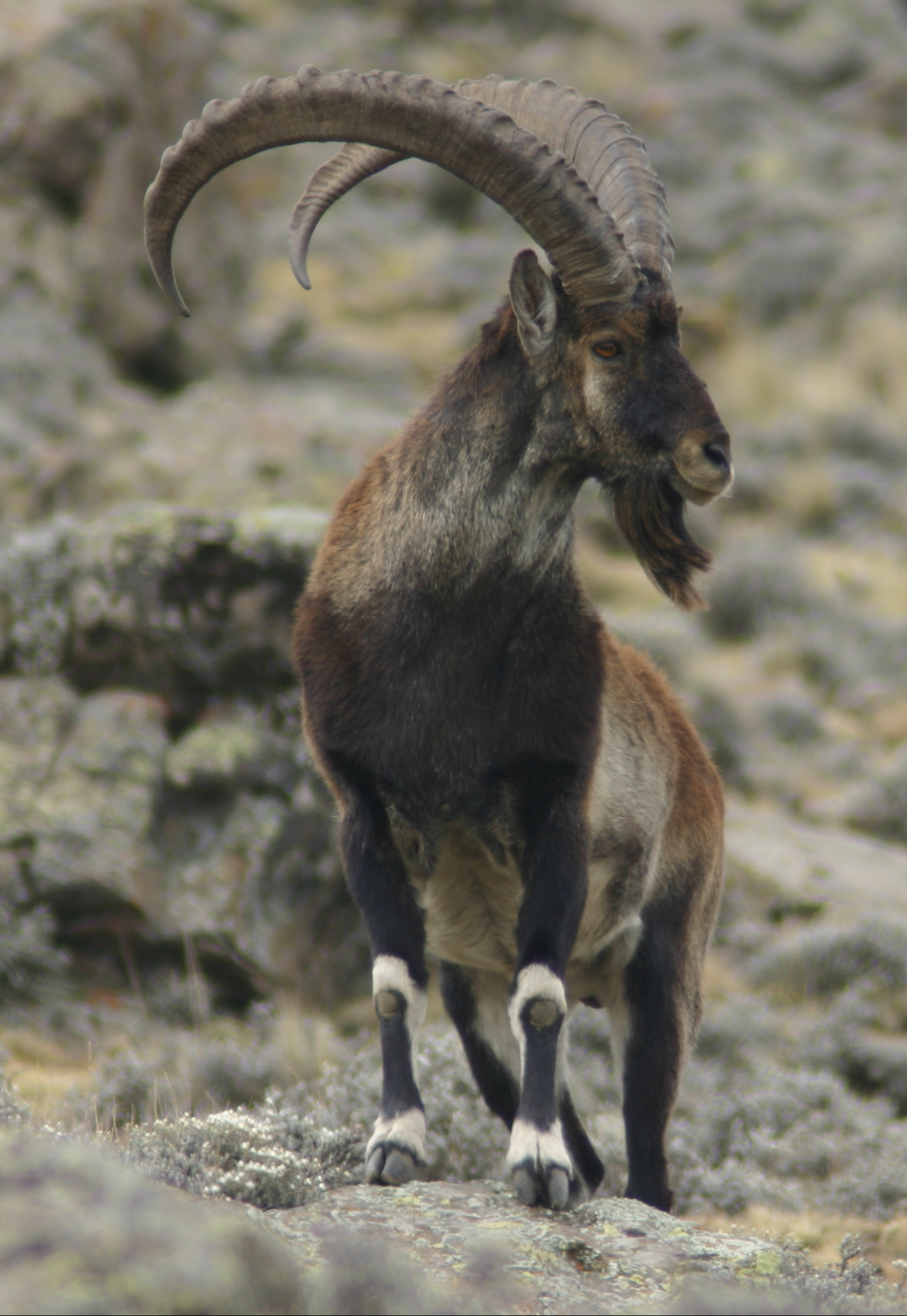
Walia ibex are found in the Simien Mountains National Park

The park is populated with a total of 21 large mammal species live within the park boundaries such as gelada baboon (Theropithecus gelada), Ethiopian wolf (also called Simen fox, Canis simensis), Walia ibex (Capra walie), and Menelik's bushbuck (Tragelaphus scriptus meneliki). Inhabits on the slope of the northern slope of the massif are mostly native to the Simien Mountains, and most of them are found in the park. The Ethiopian wolf, Gelada baboon, Menelik's bushbuck, and Walia Ibex are mammals endemic to Ethiopian Highlands. Other rare mammals include Hamadryas baboon, colobus monkey, leopard, caracal, serval, wild cat, spotted hyena, golden jackal, and Anubis baboon. There are also small herbivores that are within the slopes of simian mountains, such as rock hyrax, common duiker, and klipspringer.

In an expedition in 2015, 11 species of rodents and two shrew species were recorded, all of which are endemic to the Ethiopian Plateau, and 7 of which have only been observed in the Simien Mountains. These include Arvicanthis abyssinicus and Crocidura baileyi. A possible new species of shrew in the genus Crocidura may also have been identified.

The park provides a home to 400 species of bird species that thrived throughout the mountainous ecoregion, which includes Abyssinian Woodpecker, bearded vulture, Tawny eagle, Rüppell's vulture, Verreaux's eagle, Black-winged Lovebird, Ethiopian Black-headed Oriole, Eurasian kestrel, lanner falcon, augur buzzard and thick-billed raven.

== Conservation ==
Simien Mountains National Park was established in 1969 and is protected under the National Reserve Act. The management of national parks effectively protects the representative species of parks and works closely with local residents to reduce the pressure on park resources by expanding arable land, overfishing livestock, and overcapacity of natural resources.

Sufficient financial support is needed for park management and livelihood alternative development of local residents. It is necessary to prepare, implement, review and monitor the management plan, to revise and expand the boundary of the park, and to participate fully in the local residents. Local cooperation is particularly important to prevent sustainable use of national park resources and to develop sustainable livelihoods. Adequate financial support for resettlement of inhabitants in the heritage area and the introduction of effective livestock management are essential to reduce the severe stress on wildlife.

In order to maintain excellent universal values, environmental education and training programs of residents living in and out of the heritage are needed as well as obtaining the cooperation and support of local residents in heritage management.

== Controversy ==
The resettlement of inhabitants was criticized as a case of green colonialism, whereby local people's practices are replaced by eco-tourism economy.

== Gallery ==
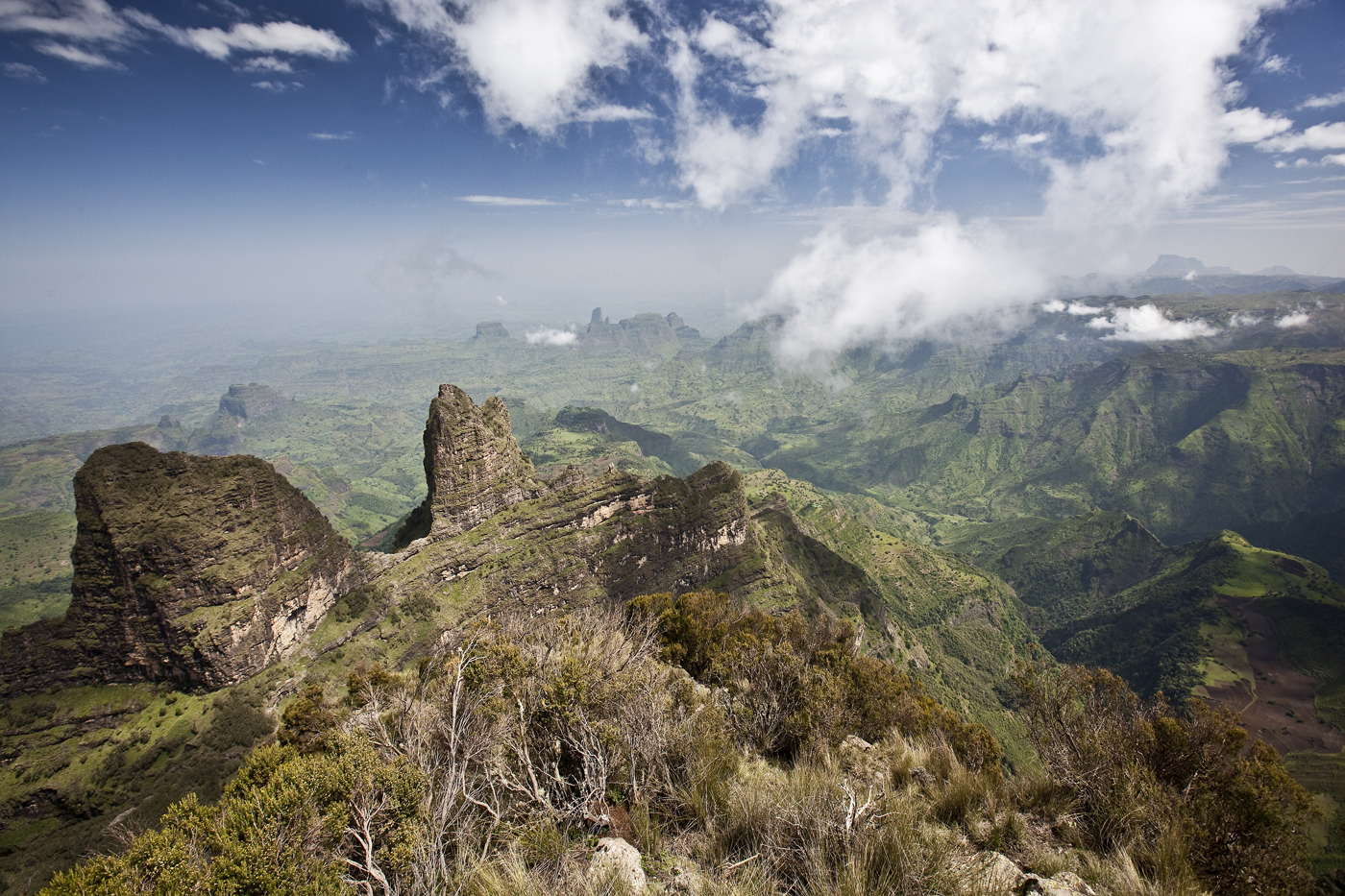
Simien Mountains

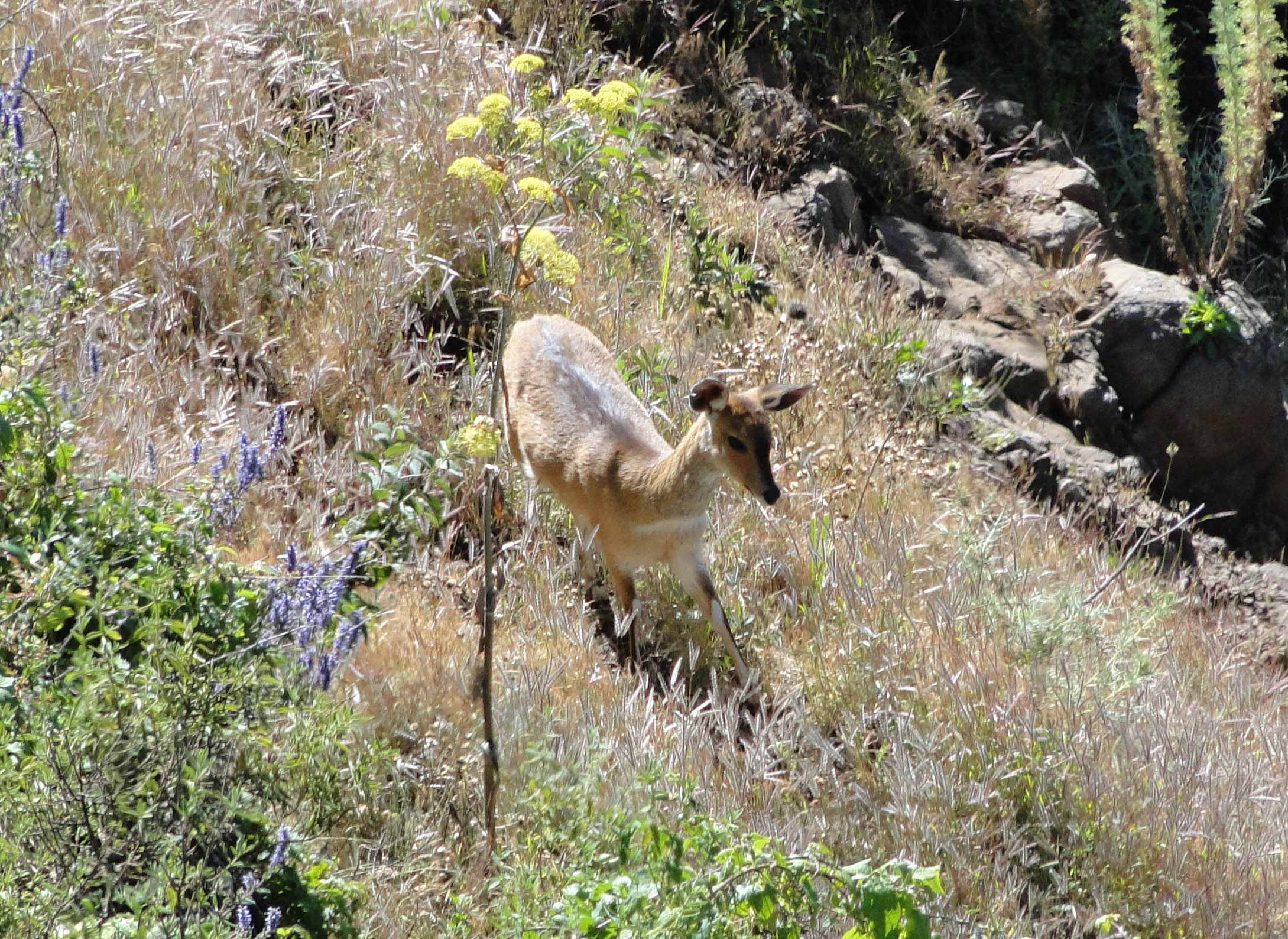
Bushbuck

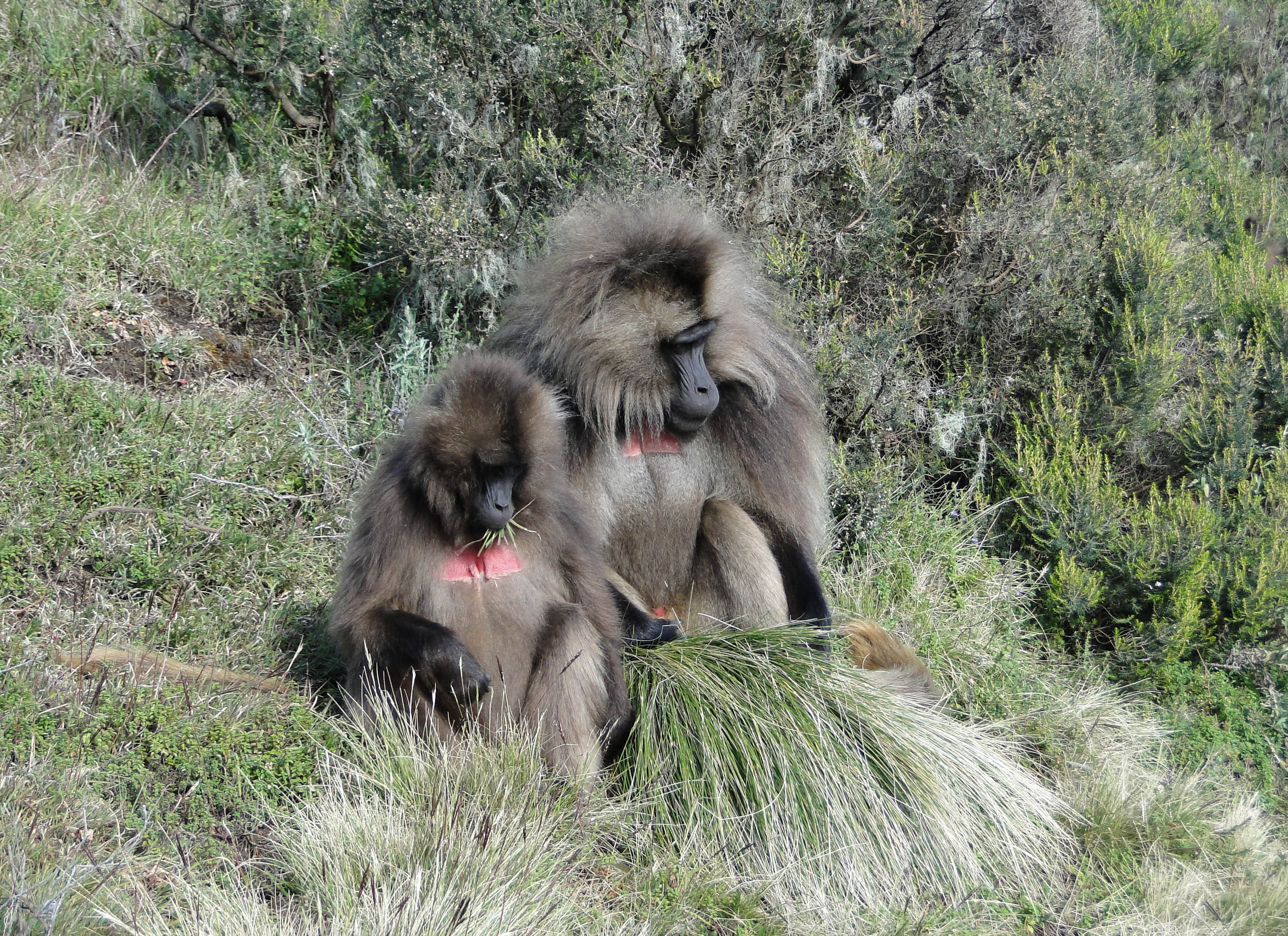
Geladas

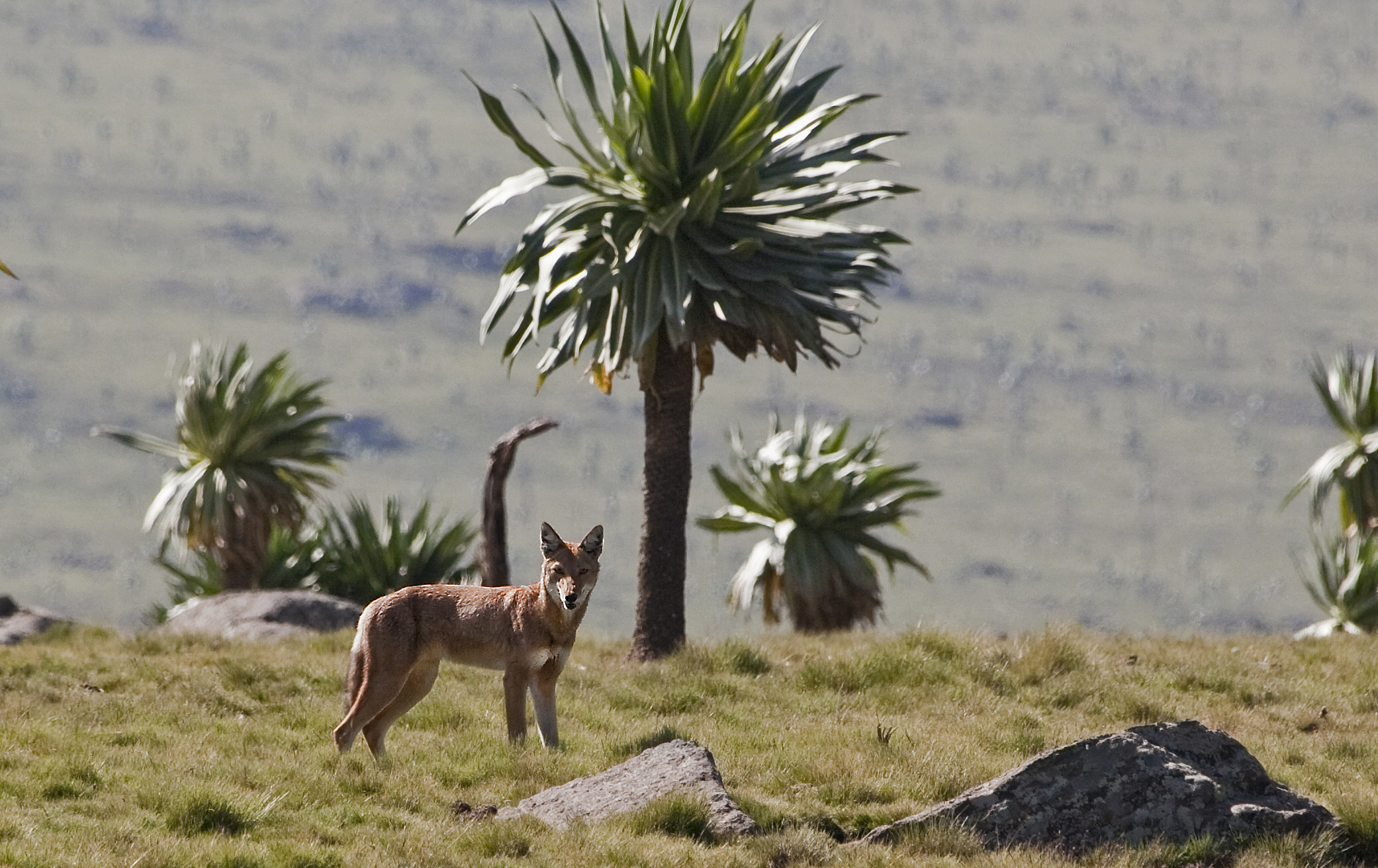
Ethiopian wolf

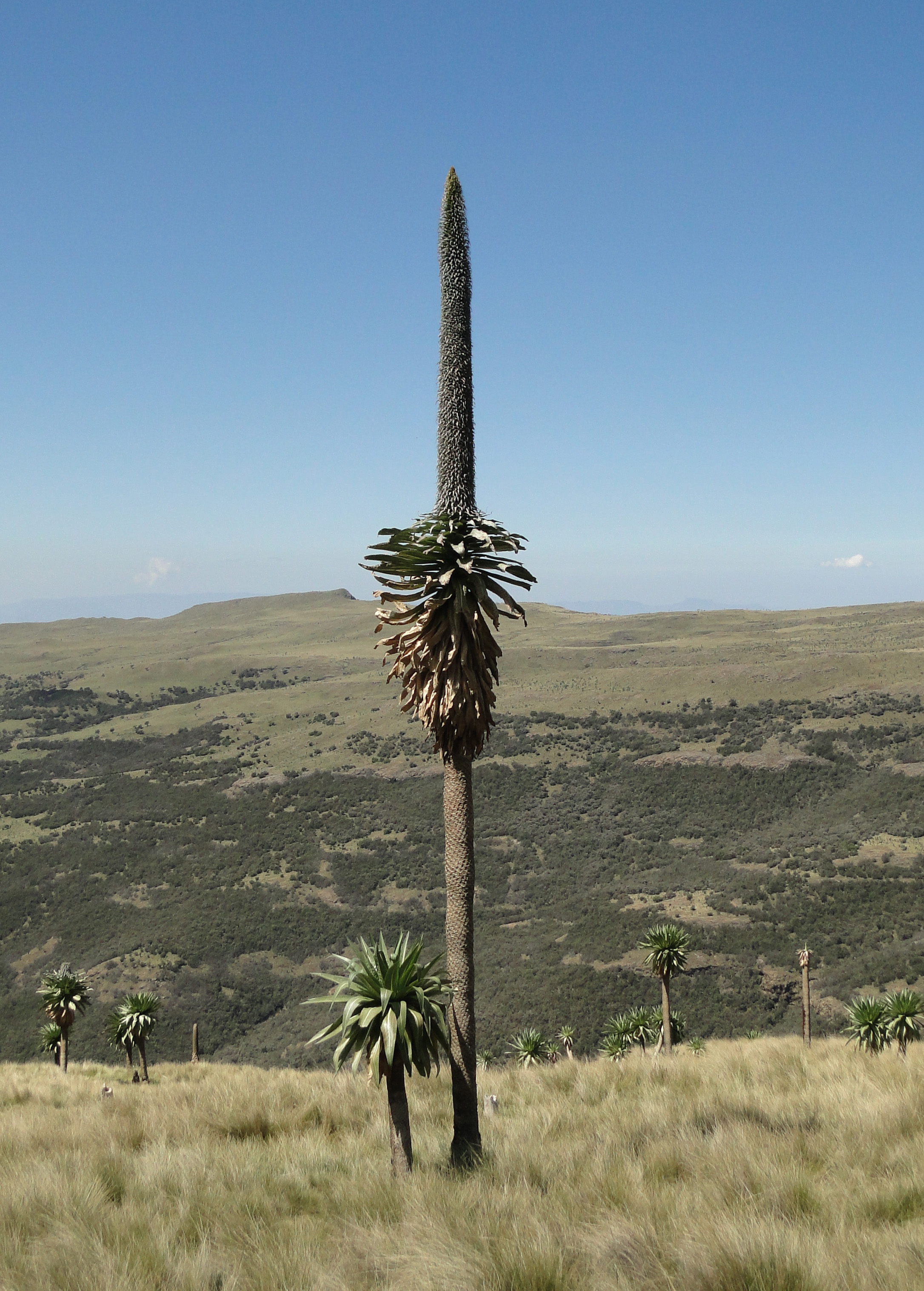
Lobelia rhynchopetalum

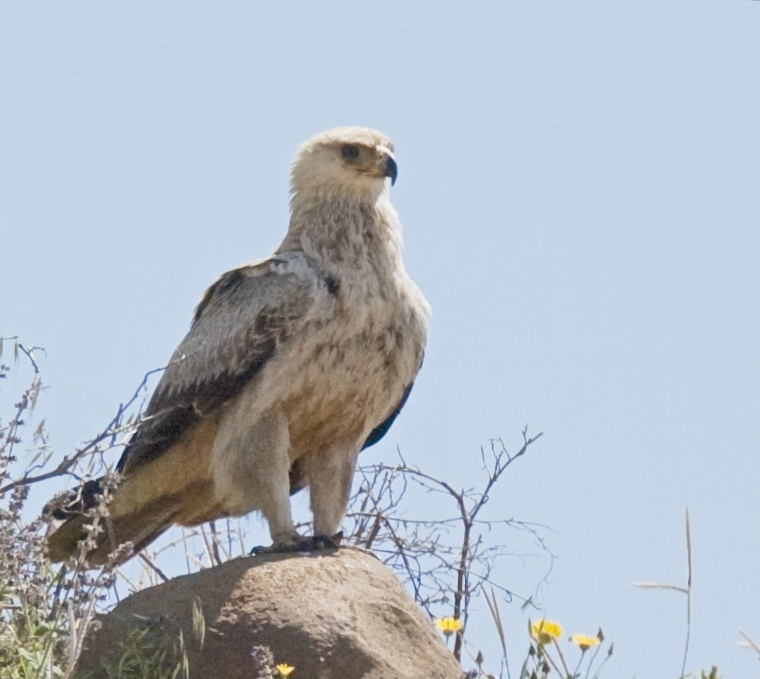
Tawny eagle

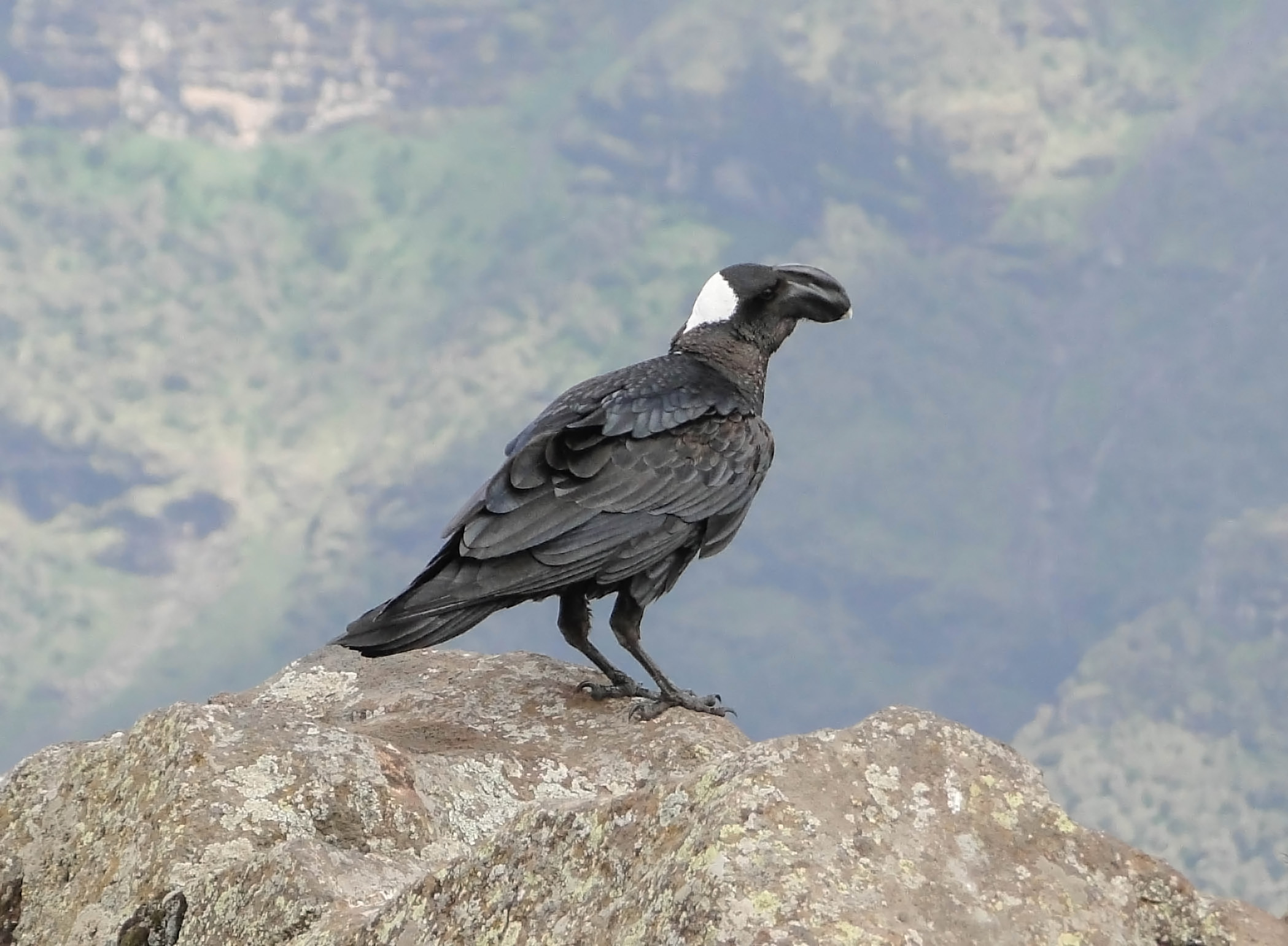
Thick-billed raven

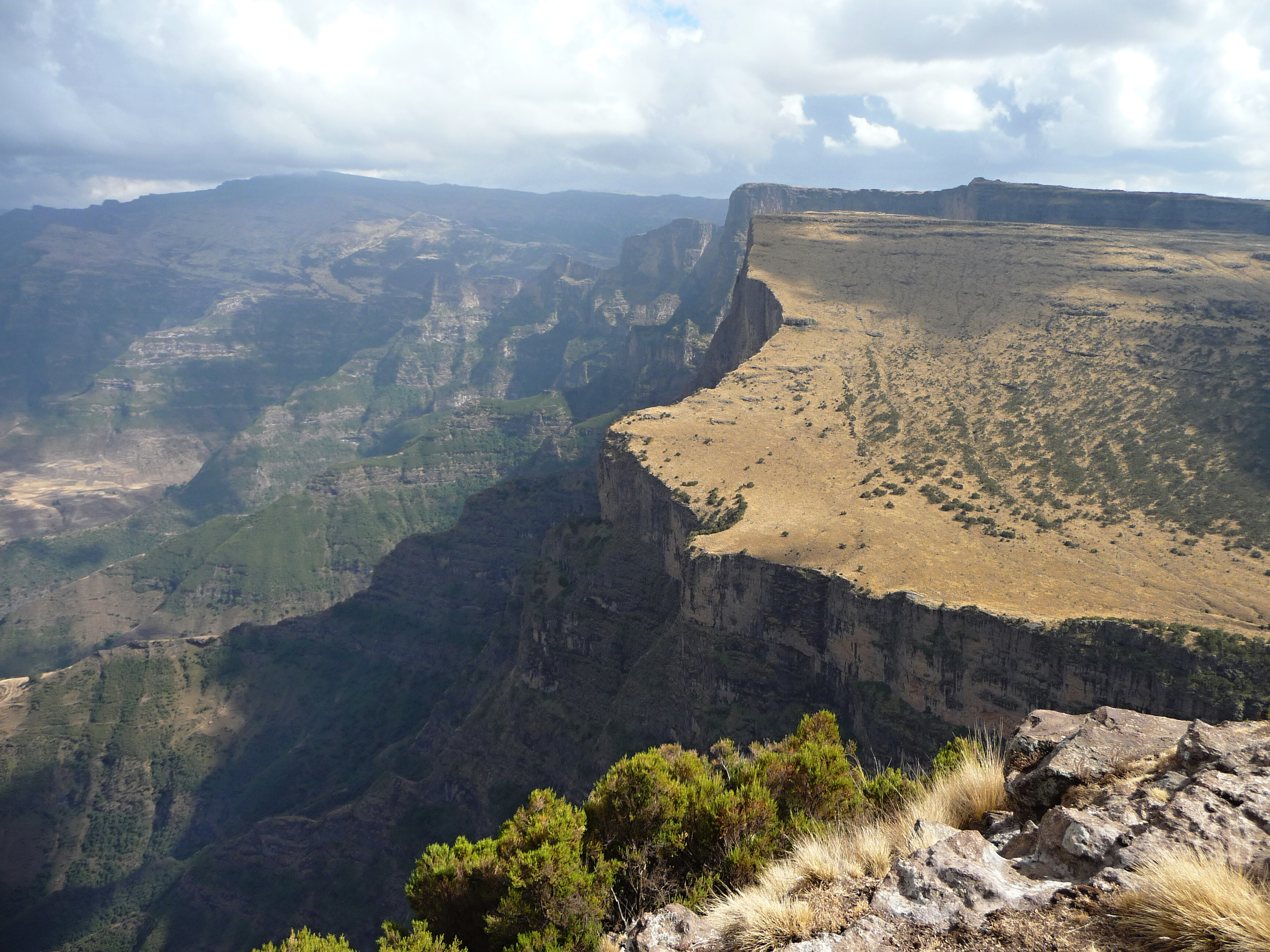
Cliff in the National Park

== See also ==
- National parks in Ethiopia
- List of World Heritage Sites in Ethiopia
