= Jin Bahir Falls =

Waterfall in Ethiopia

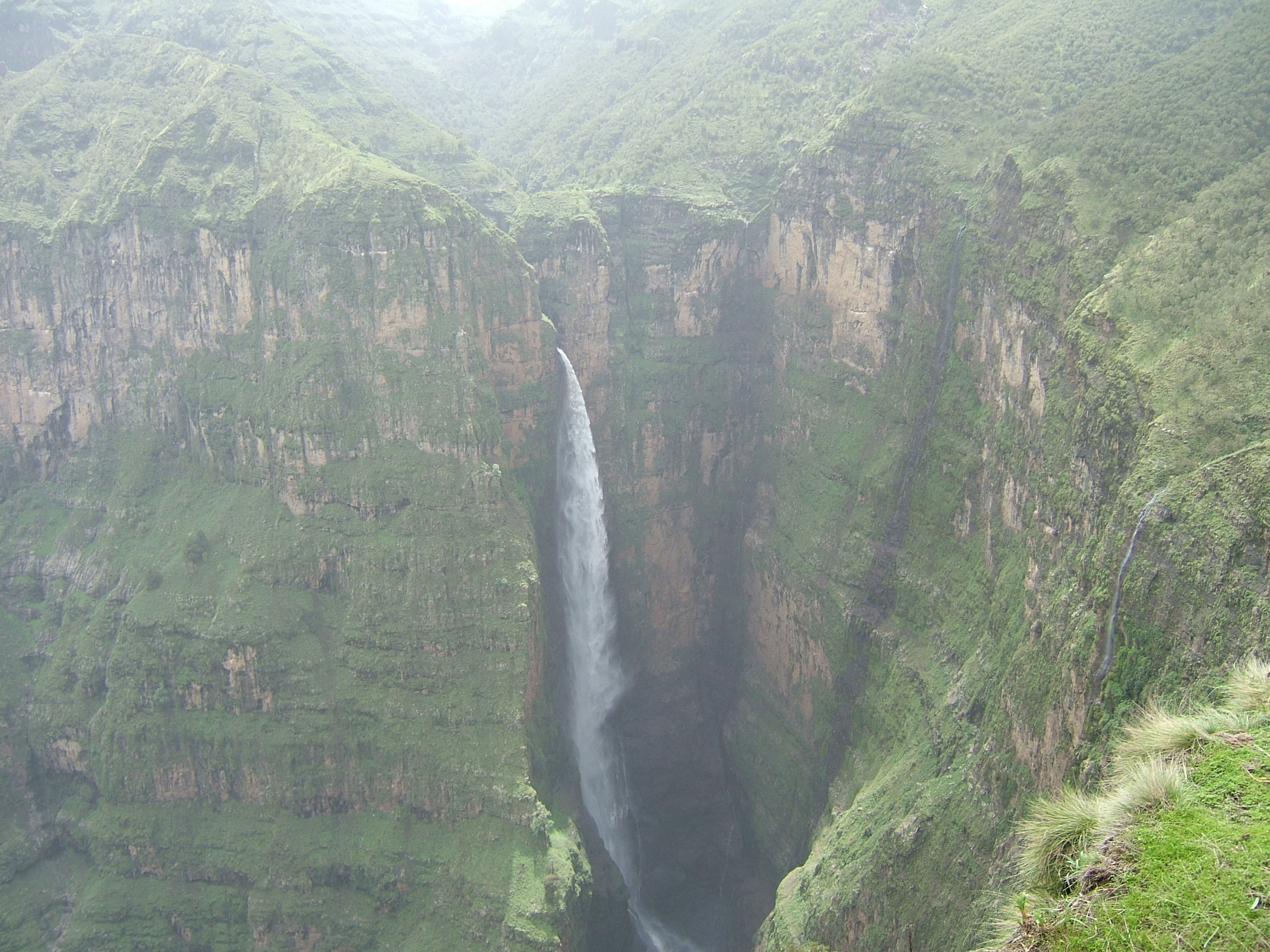

Jin Bahir Falls, also documented as Jinbar Falls and Jinbar Waterfall, is a large waterfall in Ethiopia's Simien Mountains fed by the River Jinbar. It drops about 500 meters and is one of the largest waterfalls in Africa.

The flow is increased in the rainy season. Overlooks can be accessed from the town of Ayehu.

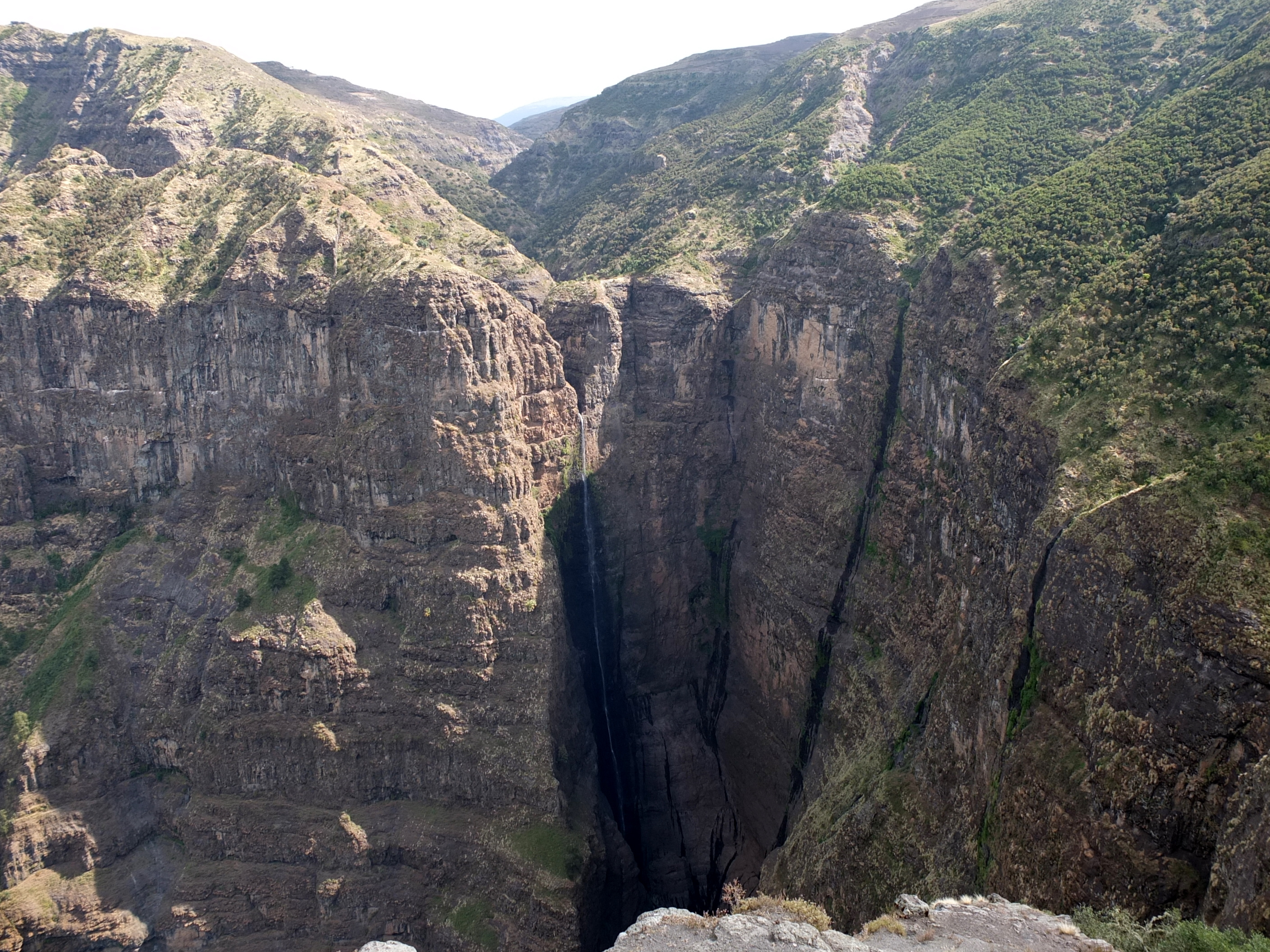

Several bird species live in the area, and author Harry Loots spotted a Rüppell's vulture near the falls.

== See also ==
- List of waterfalls
