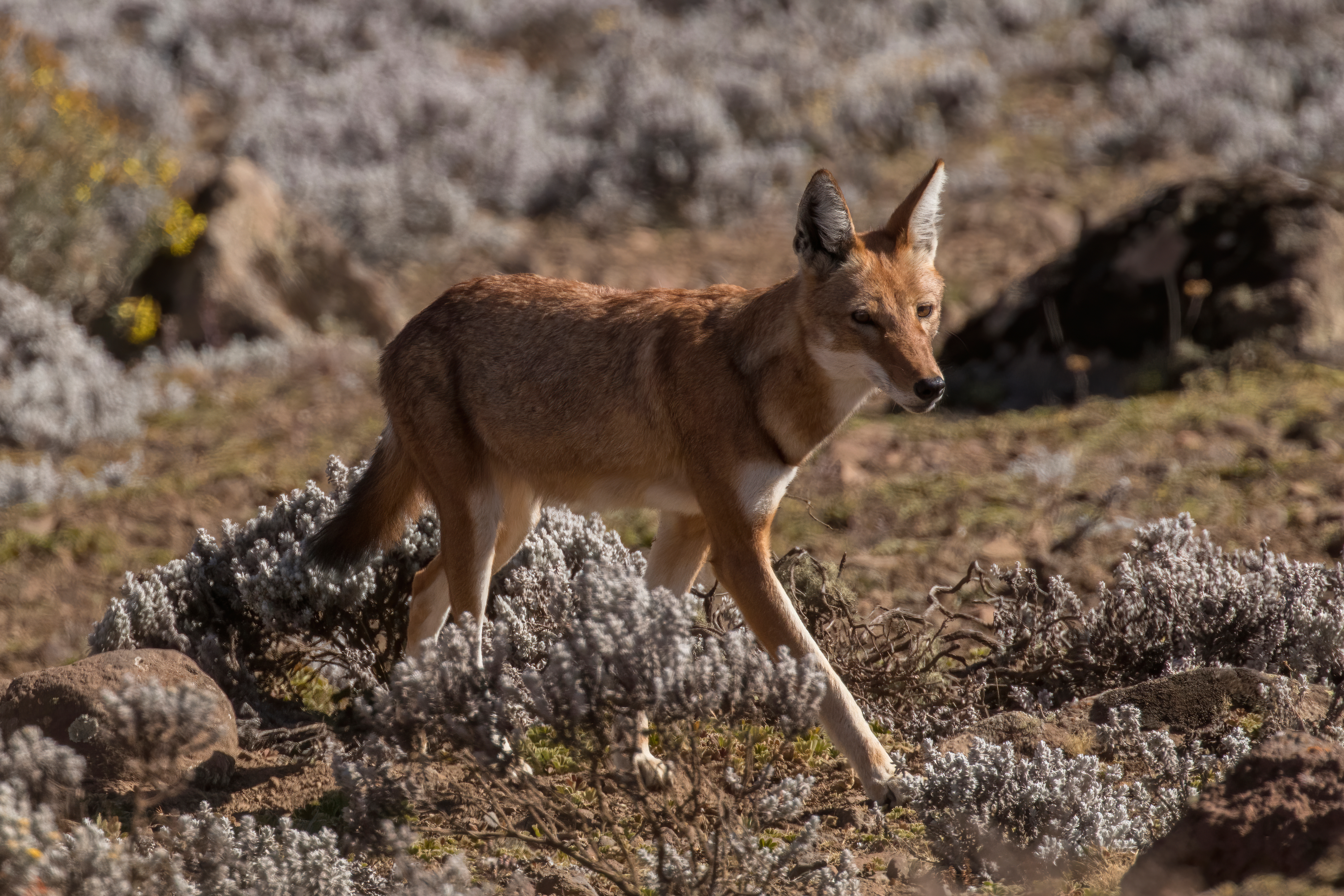
- Ethiopian wolf on the Sanetti Plateau

Conservation status
- Endangered (IUCN 3.1)

Scientific classification
- Kingdom: Animalia
- Phylum: Chordata
- Class: Mammalia
- Order: Carnivora
- Family: Canidae
- Genus: Canis
- Species: C. simensis

Binomial name
- Canis simensis Ruppell, 1840
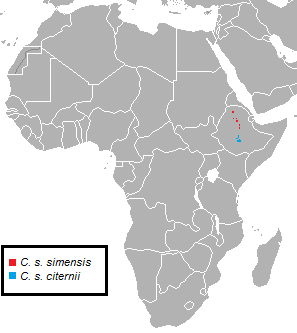
- Ethiopian wolf range

Synonyms
- C. crinensis Erlanger and Neumann, 1900; C. semiensis Heuglin, 1862; C. simensis Gray, 1869; C. walgié Heuglin, 1862; C. citernii de Beaux, 1922

= Ethiopian wolf =

Ethiopian wolf Temporal range: 1.6–0 Ma

Canine native to Ethiopian Highlands

The Ethiopian wolf (Canis simensis), also called the red jackal, the Simien jackal or Simien fox, is a canine native to the Ethiopian Highlands, including the Simien Mountains. In southeastern Ethiopia, it is also known as the horse jackal. It is similar to the coyote in size and build, and is distinguished by its long and narrow skull, and its red and white fur. Unlike most large canids, which are widespread, generalist feeders, the Ethiopian wolf is a highly specialised feeder of Afroalpine rodents with very specific habitat requirements. It is one of the world's rarest canids, and Africa's most endangered carnivore.

The species's current range is limited to seven isolated mountain ranges at altitudes of 3,000–4,500 m, with the overall adult population estimated at 360–440 individuals in 2011, more than half of them in the Bale Mountains.

The Ethiopian wolf is listed as endangered by the IUCN, on account of its small numbers and fragmented range. Threats include increasing pressure from expanding human populations, resulting in habitat degradation through overgrazing, and disease transference and interbreeding from free-ranging dogs. Its conservation is headed by Oxford University's Ethiopian Wolf Conservation Programme, which seeks to protect the wolves through vaccination and community outreach programs.

== Naming ==
Alternative English names for the Ethiopian wolf include the red jackal, the Simenian fox, the Simien jackal, Ethiopian jackal, and Abyssinian wolf.

=== Indigenous names ===
Indigenous names for Canis simensis
Linguistic group or area	Indigenous name	Literal translation
Amharic	ቀይ ቀበሮ (Ky kebero) ዋልጌ (Walgie)	Red jackal Trickster
Oromo	Jeedala fardaa Arouayé	Horse's jackal (Note: This is in reference to the Ethiopian wolf's reported habit of following mares and cows about to give birth to feed on the afterbirth.); Reddish

== Historical account ==
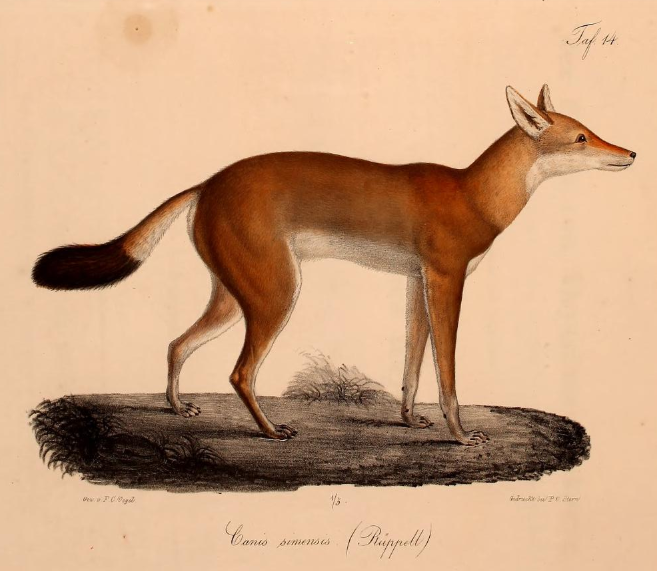
Canis simensis by Friedrich Carl Vogel (from Eduard Rüppell's Neue Wirbelthiere zu der Fauna von Abyssinien gehörig).

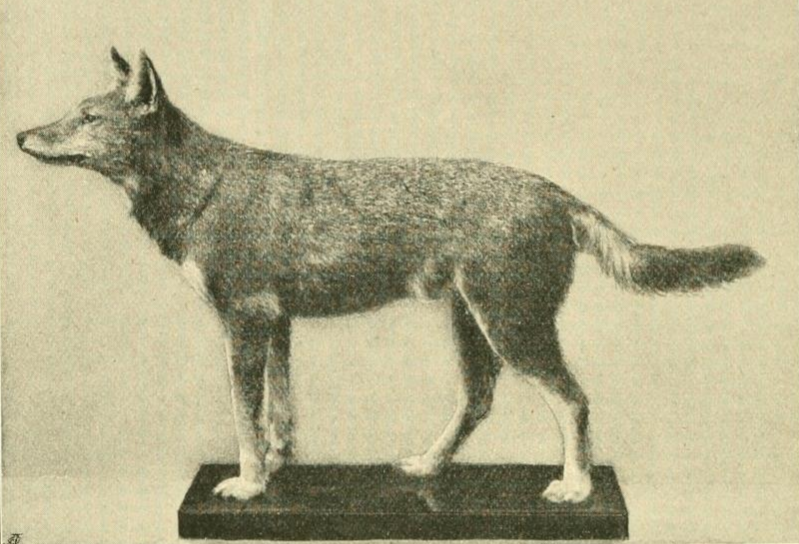
Mounted specimen (1902), one of the first post-1835 specimens to reach Europe

The species was first scientifically described in 1835 by Eduard Rüppell, who provided a skull for the British Museum. European writers traveling in Ethiopia during the mid-19th century (then called Abyssinia by Europeans and Ze Etiyopia by its citizens), wrote that the animal's skin was never worn by natives, as it was popularly believed that the wearer would die should any wolf hairs enter an open wound, while Charles Darwin hypothesised that the species gave rise to greyhounds. (Note: This was later proven incorrect in 2010, when SNP studies showed that the dog's sole ancestor is the grey wolf.) Since then, it was scarcely heard of in Europe up until the early 20th century, when several skins were shipped to England by Major Percy Powell-Cotton during his travels in Abyssinia.

The Ethiopian wolf was recognised as requiring protection in 1938, and received it in 1974. The first in-depth studies on the species occurred in the 1980s with the onset of the American-sponsored Bale Mountains Research Project. Ethiopian wolf populations in the Bale Mountains National Park were negatively affected by the political unrest of the Ethiopian Civil War, though the critical state of the species was revealed during the early 1990s after a combination of shooting and a severe rabies epidemic decimated most packs studied in the Web Valley and Sanetti Plateau. In response, the IUCN reclassified the species from endangered to critically endangered in 1994. The IUCN/SSC Canid Specialist Group advocated a three-front strategy of education, wolf population monitoring, and rabies control in domestic dogs. The establishment of the Ethiopian Wolf Conservation Programme in Bale soon followed in 1995 by Oxford University, in conjunction with the Ethiopian Wildlife Conservation Authority (EWCA).

Soon after, a further wolf population was discovered in the Central Highlands. Elsewhere, information on Ethiopian wolves remained scarce; although first described in 1835 as living in the Simien Mountains, the paucity of information stemming from that area indicated that the species was likely declining there, while reports from the Gojjam plateau were a century out of date. Wolves were recorded in the Arsi Mountains since the early 20th century, and in the Bale Mountains in the late 1950s. The status of the Ethiopian wolf was reassessed in the late 1990s, following improvements in travel conditions into northern Ethiopia. The surveys taken revealed local extinctions in Mount Choqa, Gojjam, and in every northern Afroalpine region where agriculture is well developed and human pressure acute. This revelation stressed the importance of the Bale Mountains wolf populations for the species' long-term survival, as well as the need to protect other surviving populations. A decade after the rabies outbreak, the Bale populations had fully recovered to pre-epizootic levels, prompting the species' downlisting to endangered in 2004, though it still remains the world's rarest canid, and Africa's most endangered carnivore.

== Taxonomy and evolution ==
Phylogenetic tree of the wolf-like canids with timing in millions of years (Note: For a full set of supporting references refer to the note (a) in the phylotree at Evolution of the wolf#Wolf-like canids)

- Caninae 3.5 Ma
  - 3.0
    - 2.5
      - 2.0
        - 0.96
          - 0.6
            - 0.38
              - - - Domestic dog
                  - Gray wolf
              - Coyote
            - African wolf
          - Golden jackal
        - Ethiopian wolf
      - Dhole
    - African wild dog
  - - 2.6
      - Side-striped jackal
      - Black-backed jackal

The earliest known fossil of the Ethiopian wolf is known from the Melka Wakena paleoanthropological site-complex in the Southeastern Ethiopian Highlands. It is the right half of a mandible and dated to between 1.6 and 1.4 million years ago. The authors of this study state that the ancestors of the Ethiopian wolf arrived in Africa from Eurasia at the same time as the ancestors of the African wild dog approximately 1.8 million years ago. The Ethiopian wolf has survived numerous climatic changes in its Ethiopian highland habitat, with its range repeatedly expanding and contracting with glacial cycles.

In 1994, a mitochondrial DNA analysis showed a closer relationship to the gray wolf and the coyote than to other African canids, and C. simensis may be an evolutionary relic of a gray wolf-like ancestor's past invasion of northern Africa from Eurasia.

See further: Canis evolution

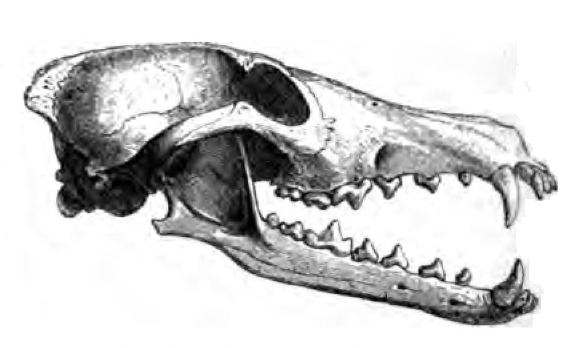
Ethiopian wolf skull: Despite its close relation to the grey wolf, convergent evolution has resulted in a skull similar in shape to that of jackals and the South American maned wolf.

Due to the high density of rodents in their new Afroalpine habitat, the ancestors of the Ethiopian wolf gradually developed into specialised rodent hunters. This specialisation is reflected in the animal's skull morphology, with its very elongated head, long jaw, and widely spaced teeth. During this period, the species likely attained its highest abundance, and had a relatively continuous distribution. This changed about 15,000 years ago with the onset of the current interglacial, which caused the species' Afroalpine habitat to fragment, thus isolating Ethiopian wolf populations from each other.

The Ethiopian wolf is one of two Canis species present in Africa, and is readily distinguishable from jackals by its larger size, relatively longer legs, distinct reddish coat, and white markings. John Edward Gray and Glover Morrill Allen originally classified the species under a separate genus, Simenia, and Oscar Neumann considered it to be "only an exaggerated fox". Juliet Clutton-Brock refuted the separate genus in favour of placing the species in the genus Canis, upon noting cranial similarities with the side-striped jackal.

In 2015, a study of mitochondrial genome sequences and whole genome nuclear sequences of African and Eurasian canids indicated that extant wolf-like canids have colonised Africa from Eurasia at least five times throughout the Pliocene and Pleistocene, which is consistent with fossil evidence suggesting that much of African canid fauna diversity resulted from the immigration of Eurasian ancestors, likely coincident with Plio-Pleistocene climatic oscillations between arid and humid conditions. According to a phylogeny derived from nuclear sequences, the Eurasian golden jackal (Canis aureus) diverged from the wolf/coyote lineage 1.9 million years ago, and with mitochondrial genome sequences indicating the Ethiopian wolf diverged from this lineage slightly prior to that. Further studies on RAD sequences found instances of Ethiopian wolves hybridizing with African golden wolves.

=== Admixture with other Canis species ===
In 2018, whole genome sequencing was used to compare members of the genus Canis. The study supports the African golden wolf being distinct from the golden jackal, and with the Ethiopian wolf being genetically basal to both. There are two genetically distinct African golden wolf populations that exist in northwestern and eastern Africa. This suggests that Ethiopian wolves – or an extinct close relative – once had a much larger range within Africa to admix with other canids. There is evidence of gene flow between the eastern population and the Ethiopian wolf, which has led to the eastern population being distinct from the northwestern population. The common ancestor of both African golden wolf populations was a genetically admixed canid of 72% grey wolf and 28% Ethiopian wolf ancestry.

=== Subspecies ===
As of 2005, two subspecies are recognised by Mammal Species of the World Volume Three (MSW3).

Subspecies	Trinomial authority	Description	Range	Synonyms
Northern Ethiopian wolf C. s. simensis (Nominate subspecies)	Rüppell, 1840		Northwest Rift Valley: Simien Mountains, Mount Guna, Guassa Menz, north and south Wollo highlands	C. s. crinensis (Erlanger & Neumann, 1900); C. s. semiensis (Heuglin, 1862); C. s. simensis (Gray, 1869); C. s. walgi (Heuglin, 1862)
Southern Ethiopian wolf C. s. citernii	de Beaux, 1922	This canid was initially classed as a distinct subspecies on account of its bright red coat, though this characteristic is unreliable as a taxonomic distinction. However, its nasal bones are consistently longer than those of the nominate subspecies.	Southeast Rift Valley: Arsi and Bale Mountains	

== Description ==
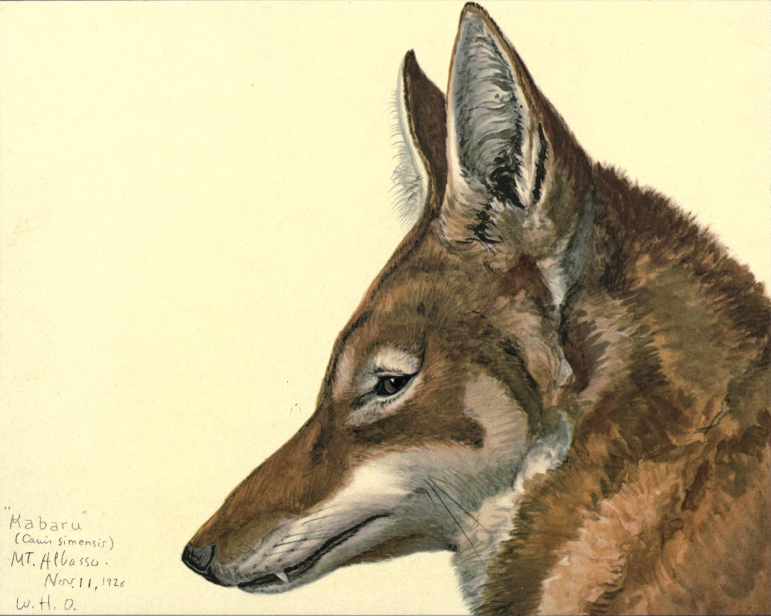
Painting (1926) by Louis Agassiz Fuertes

The Ethiopian wolf is similar in size and build to North America's coyote; it is larger than the black-backed jackal and side-striped jackals as well as the African wolf and has comparatively longer legs. Its skull is very flat, with a long facial region accounting for 58% of the skull's total length. The ears are broad, pointed, and directed forward. The teeth, particularly the premolars, are small and widely spaced. The canine teeth measure 14–22 mm in length, while the carnassials are relatively small. The Ethiopian wolf has eight mammae, of which only six are functional. The front paws have five toes, including a dewclaw, while the hind paws have four. As is typical in the genus Canis, males are larger than females, having 20% greater body mass. Adults measure 841–1,012 mm (33.1–39.8 in) in body length, and 530–620 mm (21–24 in) in height. Adult males weigh 14.2–19.3 kg (31–43 lb), while females weigh 11.2–14.15 kg (24.7–31.2 lb).

The Ethiopian wolf has short guard hairs and thick underfur, which provides protection at temperatures as low as −15 °C. Its overall colour is ochre to rusty red, with dense whitish to pale ginger underfur. The fur of the throat, chest and underparts is white, with a distinct white band occurring around the sides of the neck. There is a sharp boundary between the red coat and white marks. The ears are thickly furred on the edges, though naked on the inside. The naked borders of the lips, the gums and palate are black. The lips, a small spot on the cheeks and an ascending crescent below the eyes are white. The thickly furred tail is white underneath, and has a black tip, though, unlike most other canids, there is no dark patch marking the supracaudal gland. It moults during the wet season (August–October), and there is no evident seasonal variation in coat colour, though the contrast between the red coat and white markings increases with age and social rank. Females tend to have paler coats than males. During the breeding season, the female's coat turns yellow, becomes woolier, and the tail turns brownish, losing much of its hair.

Animals resulting from Ethiopian wolf-dog hybridisation tend to be more heavily built than pure wolves, and have shorter muzzles and different coat patterns.

== Behaviour ==
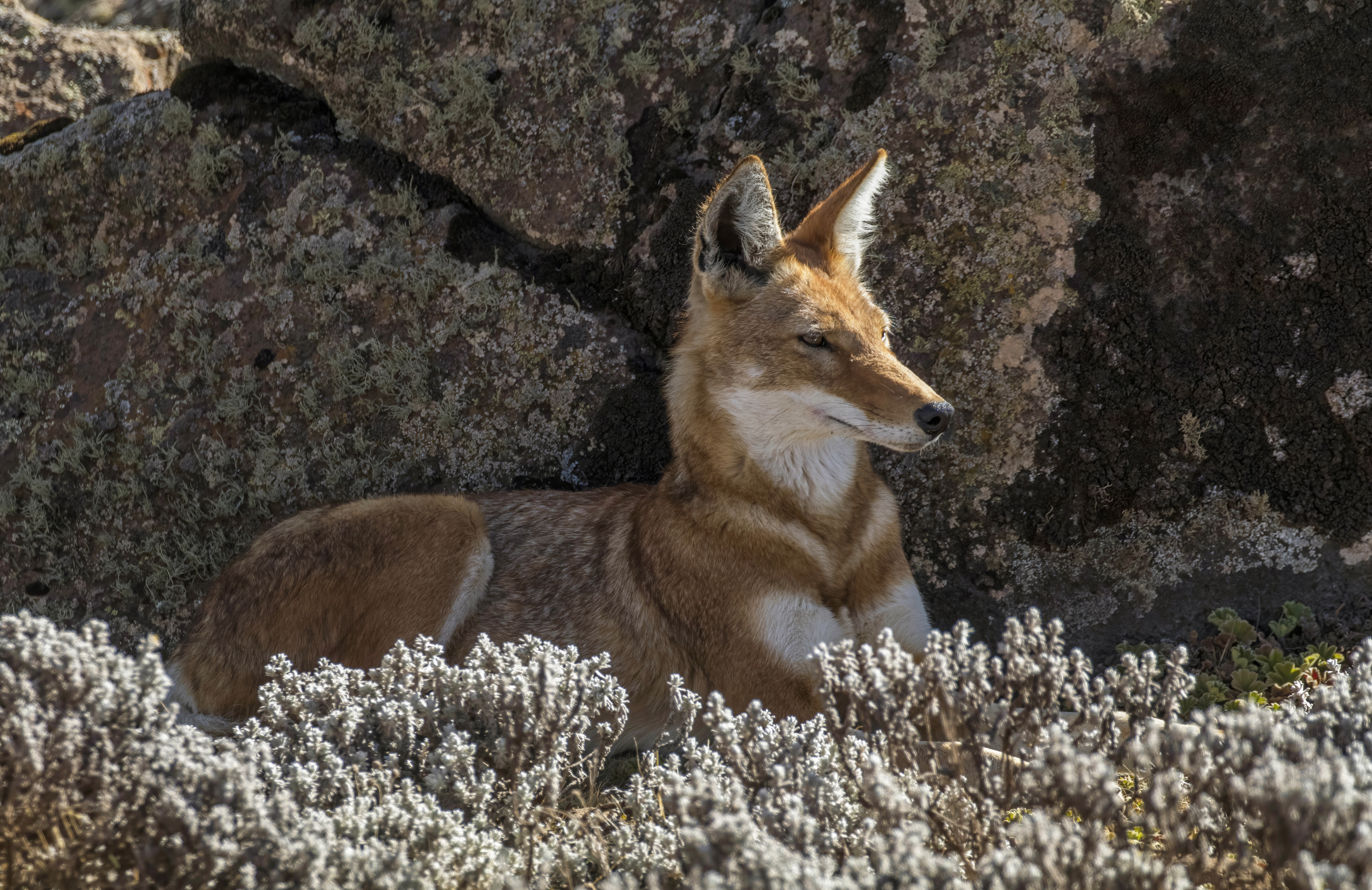
Southern Ethiopian wolf in the Bale Mountains

=== Social and territorial behaviours ===
The Ethiopian wolf is a social animal, living in family groups containing up to 20 adults (individuals older than one year), though packs of six wolves are more common. Packs are formed by dispersing males and a few females, which with the exception of the breeding female, are reproductively suppressed. Each pack has a well-established hierarchy, with dominance and subordination displays being common. Upon dying, a breeding female can be replaced by a resident daughter, though this increases the risk of inbreeding. Such a risk is sometimes circumvented by multiple paternity and extra-pack matings. The dispersal of wolves from their packs is largely restricted by the scarcity of unoccupied habitat.

These packs live in communal territories, which encompass 6 km^{2} (2.3 sq mi) of land on average. In areas with little food, the species lives in pairs, sometimes accompanied by pups, and defends larger territories averaging 13.4 km^{2} (5.2 sq mi). In the absence of disease, Ethiopian wolf territories are largely stable, but packs can expand whenever the opportunity arises, such as when another pack disappears. The size of each territory correlates with the abundance of rodents, the number of wolves in a pack, and the survival of pups. Ethiopian wolves rest together in the open at night, and congregate for greetings and border patrols at dawn, noon, and evening. They may shelter from rain under overhanging rocks and behind boulders. The species never sleeps in dens, and only uses them for nursing pups. When patrolling their territories, Ethiopian wolves regularly scent-mark, and interact aggressively and vocally with other packs. Such confrontations typically end with the retreat of the smaller group.

=== Reproduction and development ===
The mating season usually takes place between August and November. Courtship involves the breeding male following the female closely. The breeding female only accepts the advances of the breeding male, or males from other packs. The gestation period is 60–62 days, with pups being born between October and December. Pups are born toothless and with their eyes closed, and are covered in a charcoal-grey coat with a buff patch on the chest and abdomen. Litters consist of two to six pups, which emerge from their den after three weeks, when the dark coat is gradually replaced with the adult colouration. By the age of five weeks, the pups feed on a combination of milk and solid food, and become completely weaned off milk at the age of 10 weeks to six months. All members of the pack contribute to protecting and feeding the pups, with subordinate females sometimes assisting the dominant female by suckling them. Full growth and sexual maturity are attained at the age of two years. Cooperative breeding and pseudopregnancy have been observed in Ethiopian wolves.

Most females disperse from their natal pack at about two years of age, and some become "floaters" that may successfully immigrate into existing packs. Breeding pairs are most often unrelated to each other, suggesting that female-biased dispersal reduces inbreeding. Inbreeding is ordinarily avoided because it leads to a reduction in progeny fitness (inbreeding depression) due largely to the homozygous expression of deleterious recessive alleles.

=== Hunting behaviours ===
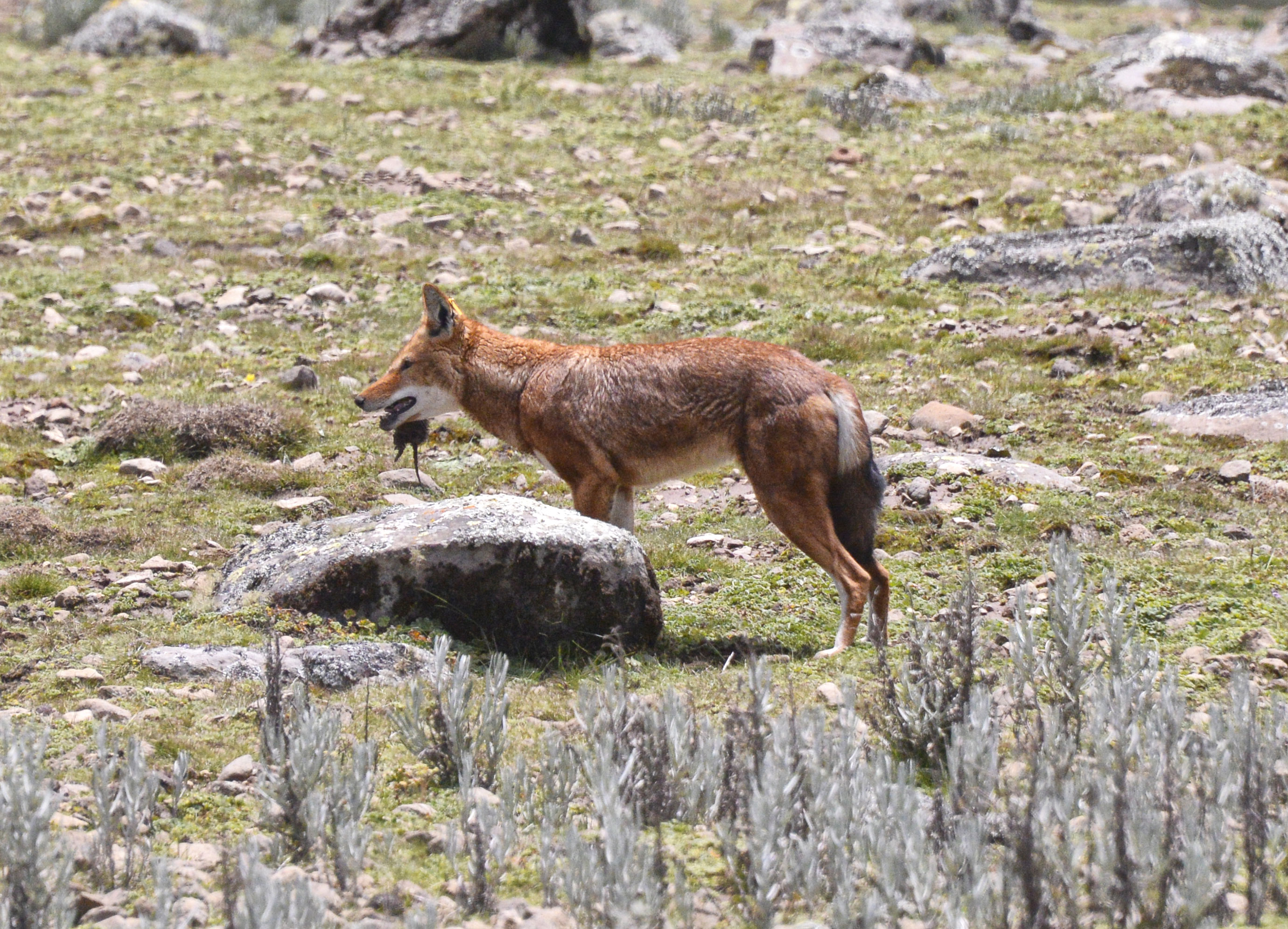
Southern Ethiopian wolf feeding, Bale Mountains.

Unlike most social carnivores, the Ethiopian wolf tends to forage and feed on small prey alone. It is most active during the day, the time when rodents are themselves most active, though they have been observed to hunt in groups when targeting mountain nyala calves. Major Percy-Cotton described the hunting behaviour of Ethiopian wolves as thus:

... they are most amusing to watch, when hunting. The rats, which are brown, with short tails, live in big colonies and dart from burrow to burrow, while the cuberow stands motionless till one of them shows, when he makes a pounce for it. If he is unsuccessful, he seems to lose his temper, and starts digging violently; but this is only lost labour, as the ground is honeycombed with holes, and every rat is yards away before he has thrown up a pawful.

The technique described above is commonly used in hunting big-headed African mole-rats, with the level of effort varying from scratching lightly at the hole to totally destroying a set of burrows, leaving metre-high earth mounds.

Wolves in Bale have been observed to forage among cattle herds, a tactic thought to aid in ambushing rodents out of their holes by using the cattle to hide their presence. Ethiopian wolves have also been observed forming temporary associations with troops of grazing geladas. Solitary wolves hunt for rodents in the midst of the monkeys, ignoring juvenile monkeys, though these are similar in size to some of their prey. The monkeys, in turn, tolerate and largely ignore the wolves, although they take flight if they observe feral dogs, which sometimes prey on them. Within the troops, the wolves enjoy much higher success in capturing rodents than usual, perhaps because the monkeys' activities flush out the rodents, or because the presence of numerous larger animals makes it harder for rodents to spot a threat.

== Ecology ==
=== Habitat ===
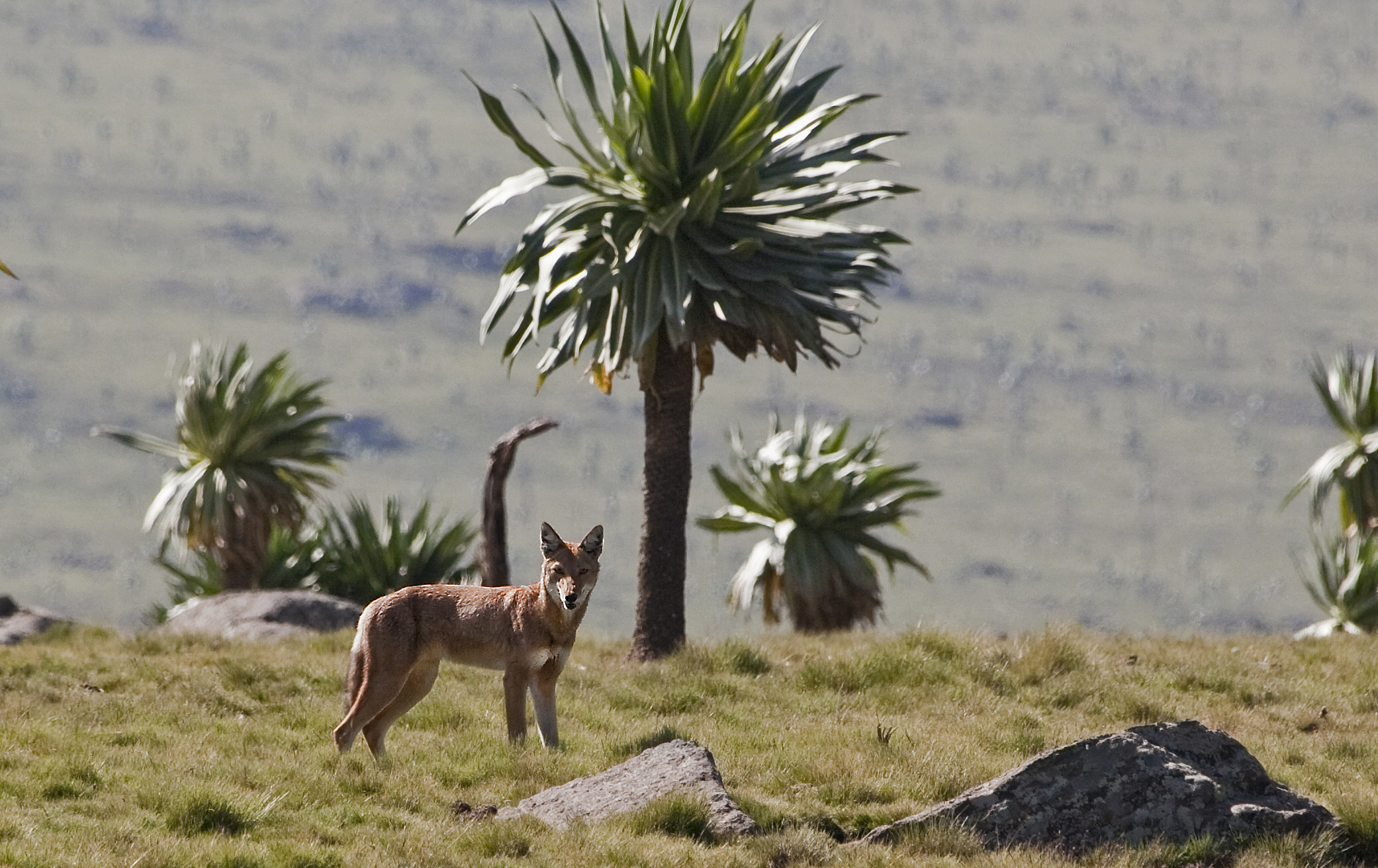
Northern Ethiopian wolf in the Simien Mountains

The Ethiopian wolf is restricted to isolated pockets of Afroalpine grasslands and heathlands inhabited by Afroalpine rodents. Its ideal habitat extends from above the tree line around 3,200 to 4,500 m, with some wolves inhabiting the Bale Mountains being present in montane grasslands at 3,000 m. Although specimens were collected in Gojjam and northwestern Shoa at 2,500 m in the early 20th century, no recent records exist of the species occurring below 3,000 m. In modern times, subsistence agriculture, which extends up to 3,700 m, has largely restricted the species to the highest peaks.

The Ethiopian wolf uses all Afroalpine habitats, but has a preference for open areas containing short herbaceous and grassland communities inhabited by rodents, which are most abundant along flat or gently sloping areas with poor drainage and deep soils. Prime wolf habitat in the Bale Mountains consists of short Alchemilla herbs and grasses, with low vegetation cover. Other favourable habitats consist of tussock grasslands, high-altitude scrubs rich in Helichrysum, and short grasslands growing in shallow soils. In its northern range, the wolf's habitat is composed of plant communities characterised by a matrix of Festuca tussocks, Euryops bushes, and giant lobelias, all of which are favoured by the wolf's rodent prey. Although marginal in importance, the ericaceous moorlands at 3,200–3,600 m in Simien may provide a refuge for wolves in highly disturbed areas.

=== Diet ===
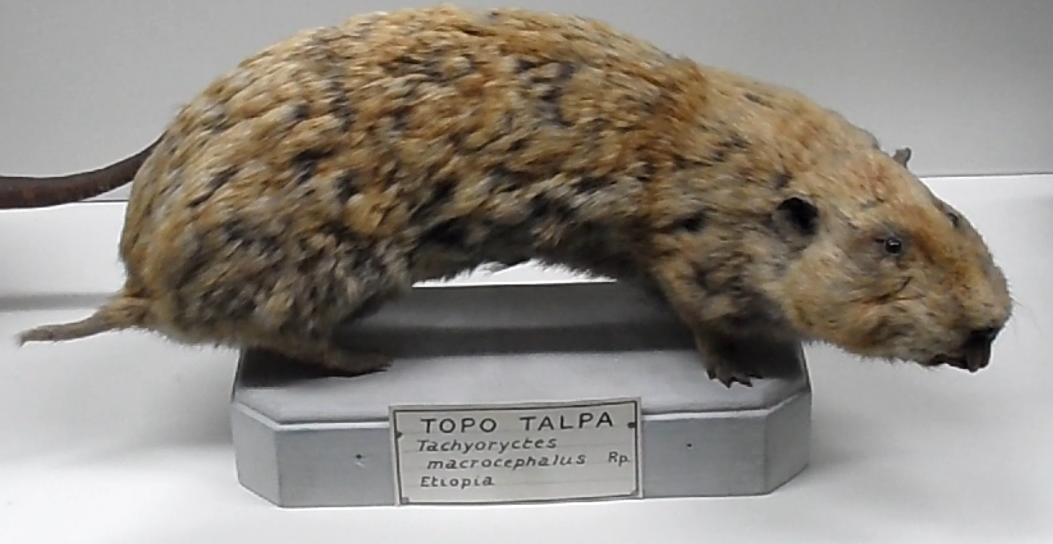
Big-headed mole rat (Tachyoryctes macrocephalus), one of the Ethiopian wolf's primary prey animals

In the Bale Mountains, the Ethiopian wolf's primary prey are big-headed African mole-rats, though it also feeds on grass rats, black-clawed brush-furred rats, and highland hares. Other secondary prey species include vlei rats, yellow-spotted brush-furred rats, and occasionally goslings and eggs. Ethiopian wolves have twice been observed to feed on rock hyraxes, and mountain nyala calves. It will also prey on reedbuck calves. In areas where the big-headed African mole-rat is absent, the smaller Northeast African mole-rat is targeted. In the Simien Mountains, the Ethiopian wolf preys on Abyssinian grass rats. Undigested sedge leaves (Carex sp.) have occasionally been found among Ethiopian wolf stomach contents, which may be consumed for roughage or for parasite control. It has also consumes nectar from the flowers of Kniphofia foliosa with researchers describing it as the only large carnivore known to eat nectar suggesting the pollen it picks up on its muzzle aids pollinate the plant. The species may scavenge on carcasses, but is usually displaced by free-ranging dogs and African golden wolves. It typically poses no threat to livestock, with farmers often leaving herds in wolf-inhabited areas unattended.

== Range and populations ==
Six current Ethiopian wolf populations are known. North of the Rift Valley, the species occurs in the Simien Mountains in Gondar, in the northern and southern Wollo highlands, and in Guassa Menz in north Shoa. It has recently become extinct in Gosh Meda in north Shoa and Mount Guna, and has not been reported in Mount Choqa for several decades. Southeast of the Rift Valley, it occurs in the Arsi and Bale Mountains.

Summary of current status of Canis simensis
Area	Habitat	Population size estimates	Status	Importance	Threats	Conservation
Simien Mountains, North Gondar	Patches connected by corridors, totalling 273 km^{2}	102 (as of 2010)	Stable?	The second-largest population, the most genetically diverse, is a tourist attraction.	Human disturbance, road traffic, extensive agriculture, habitat degradation, Helichrysum encroachment into rodent habitat, disease, and competition/predation by golden wolves	The entire range is within the Simien Mountains National Park, and has been monitored regularly since 2003.
Mt. Guna, South Gondar	An isolated patch, estimated at less than 20 km^{2} by 2004	As of 2011, no sightings have been made, despite intensive monitoring during two field visits.	Extinct		Small population, habitat loss, isolation, and possible competition with abundant golden wolf populations	An ORDA Biodiversity Conservation Project is active in the area, in conjunction with woreda and kebele governments, and supported by the Guna Highland Water enterprise.
North Wollo Highlands	Patchily distributed in an area of 140 km^{2}	19–23 (as of 2000)	Possibly declining, otherwise stable, as of 1998		Isolation, habitat degradation, human-wildlife conflict, and road encroachment	The Frankfurt Zoological Society and its associates are working to create the Abuna Yoseph Community Conservation Area, which is to encompass about a third of the wolf's range in North Wollo.
South Wollo highlands	Patches connected by corridors, totalling 243 km^{2}	16–19 (as of 2000)	Stable?	After Simien, the second-largest area north of the Rift Valley	Overgrazing, ploughing, persecution, and local negative attitudes	The local ericaceous forests and grasslands are under the protection of the Borena Saiynt Regional Park from agriculture as low as 3,200 m. The EWCP and the FZS have been involved in educational programs and wolf monitoring in the Denkoro area.
Guassa Menz, North Shoa	A single patch of 112 km^{2}	As of 2010, an estimated 40% have been missing since a canine distemper outbreak was detected in local dogs.	Although diminishing from disease, the population is healthy and stable.	A core population with ideal habitat, it is increasingly a tourist attraction.	Human disturbance, rabies, Helichrysum encroachment into rodent habitat, and road traffic	The wolf's range is protected by community resource management, and the Guassa Community Conservation Area. Educational campaigns are undertaken in schools near wolf ranges.
Arsi Mountains, Bale	870 km^{2}	54 wolves in 9 packs, as of 2007-2010	Probably declining	The third-largest population, in the second-largest Afroalpine area in Ethiopia	Habitat degradation, expanding agriculture, and road traffic	Protected within the Arsi Mountains Regional Park
Bale Mountains, Bale	1,141 km^{2}	About 250 adults and subadults	Declining, but stable in long term	The largest population, with the highest density of prey	Disease (rabies and distemper) and agricultural expansion	Most of the species' habitat occurs within the Bale Mountains National Park.

== Threats ==
The Ethiopian wolf has been considered rare since it was first recorded scientifically. The species likely has always been confined to Afroalpine habitats, so it was never widespread. In historical times, all of the Ethiopian wolf's threats are both directly and indirectly human-induced, as the wolf's highland habitat, with its high annual rainfall and rich fertile soils, is ideal for agricultural activities. Its proximate threats include habitat loss and fragmentation (subsistence agriculture, overgrazing, road construction, and livestock farming), diseases (primarily rabies and canine distemper), conflict with humans (poisoning, persecution, and road kills), and hybridisation with dogs.

=== Disease ===
Rabies outbreaks, stemming from infected dogs, have killed many Ethiopian wolves over the 1990s and 2000s. Two well-documented outbreaks in Bale, one in 1991 and another in 2008–2009, resulted in the die-off or disappearance of 75% of known animals. Both incidents prompted reactive vaccinations in 2003 and 2008–2009, respectively. Canine distemper is not necessarily fatal to wolves, though a recent increase in infection has occurred, with outbreaks of canine distemper having been detected in 2005–2006 in Bale and in 2010 across subpopulations.

=== Habitat loss ===
During the 1990s, wolf populations in Gosh Meda and Guguftu became extinct. In both cases, the extent of Afroalpine habitat above the limit of agriculture had been reduced to less than 20 km^{2}. The EWCP team confirmed the extinction of a wolf population in Mt. Guna in 2011, whose numbers had been in single figures for several years. Habitat loss in the Ethiopian highlands is directly linked to agricultural expansion into Afroalpine areas. In the northern highlands, human density is among the highest in Africa, with 300 people per km^{2} in some localities, with almost all areas below 3,700 m having been converted into barley fields. Suitable areas of land below this limit are under some level of protection, such as Guassa-Menz and the Denkoro Reserve, or within the southern highlands, such as the Arsi and Bale Mountains. The most vulnerable wolf populations to habitat loss are those within relatively low-lying Afroalpine ranges, such as those in Aboi Gara and Delanta in North Wollo.

=== Population fragmentation ===
Some Ethiopian wolf populations, particularly those in North Wollo, show signs of high fragmentation, which is likely to increase with current rates of human expansion. The dangers posed by fragmentation include increased contact with humans, dogs, and livestock, and further risk of isolation and inbreeding in wolf populations. Although no evidence of inbreeding depression or reduced fitness exists, the extremely small wolf population sizes, particularly those north of the Rift Valley, raise concerns among conservationists. Elsewhere, the Bale populations are fairly continuous, while those in Simien can still interbreed through habitat corridors.

=== Encroachment within protected areas ===
In the Simien Mountains National Park, human and livestock populations are increasing by 2% annually, with further road construction allowing easy access to peasants into wolf home ranges; 3,171 people in 582 households were found to be living in the park and 1,477 outside the park in October 2005. Although the area of the park has since been expanded, further settlement stopped, and grazing restricted, effective enforcement may take years. As of 2011, about 30,000 people live in 30 villages around and two within the park, including 4,650 cereal farmers, herders, woodcutters, and many others. In Bale there are numerous villages in and around the area, comprising over 8,500 households with more than 12,500 dogs. In 2007, the estimate of households within wolf habitat numbered 1,756. Because of the high number of dogs, the risk of infection in local wolf populations is high. Furthermore, intentional and unintentional brush fires are frequent in the ericaceous moorlands wolves inhabit.

=== Overgrazing ===
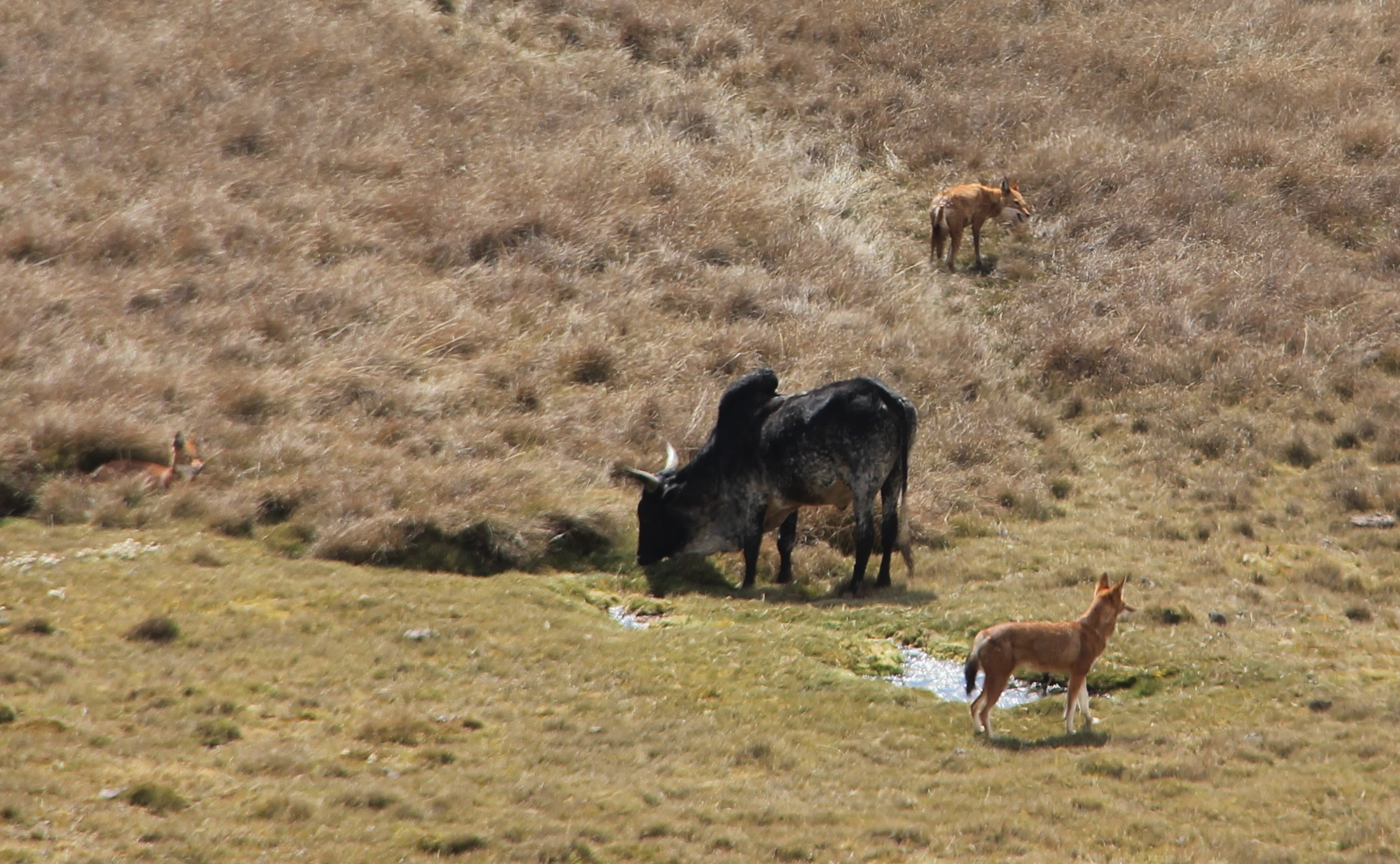
Ethiopian wolves resting alongside grazing zebu

Although wolves in Bale have learned to use cattle to conceal their presence when hunting for rodents, the level of grazing in the area can adversely affect the vegetation available for the wolves' prey. Although no declines in wolf populations related to overgrazing have occurred, high grazing intensities are known to lead to soil erosion and vegetation deterioration in Afroalpine areas such as Delanta and Simien.

=== Human persecution and disturbance ===
Direct killings of wolves were more frequent during the Ethiopian Civil War, when firearms were more available. The extinction of wolves in Mt. Choqa was likely due to persecution. Although people living close to wolves in modern times believe that wolf populations are recovering, negative attitudes towards the species persist due to livestock predation. Wolves were largely unmolested by humans in Bale, as they were not considered threats to sheep and goats. However, they are perceived as threats to livestock elsewhere, with cases of retaliatory killings occurring in the Arsi Mountains. The Ethiopian wolf has not been recorded to be exploited for its fur, though in one case, wolf hides were used as saddle pads. It was once hunted by sportsmen, though this is now illegal. Vehicle collisions killed at least four wolves in the Sanetti Plateau since 1988, while two others were left with permanent limps. Similar accidents are a risk in areas where roads cut across wolf habitats, such as in Menz and Arsi.

=== Hybridisation with dogs ===
Management plans for hybridization with dogs involve sterilization of known hybrids. Incidences of Ethiopian wolf-dog hybridization have been recorded in Bale's Web Valley. At least four hybrids were identified and sterilized in the area. Although hybridization has not been detected elsewhere, scientists are concerned that it could pose a threat to the wolf population's genetic integrity, resulting in outbreeding depression or a reduction in fitness, though this does not appear to have taken place. Due to the female's strong preference to avoid inbreeding, hybridization could be the result of not finding any males who are not close relatives outside of dogs.

=== Competition with African golden wolves ===
Encounters with African golden wolves (Canis lupaster) are usually agonistic, with Ethiopian wolves dominating African wolves if the latter enter their territories, and vice versa. Although African golden wolves are inefficient rodent hunters and thus not in direct competition with Ethiopian wolves, it is likely that heavy human persecution prevents the former from attaining numbers large enough to completely displace the latter.

== Conservation ==
The Ethiopian wolf is not listed on the CITES appendices, though it is afforded full official protection under Ethiopia's Wildlife Conservation Regulations of 1974, Schedule VI, with the killing of a wolf carrying a two-year jail sentence.

The species is present in several protected areas, including three areas in South Wollo (Bale Mountains National Park, Simien Mountains National Park, and Borena Sayint Regional Park), one in north Shoa (Guassa Community Conservation Area), and one in the Arsi Mountains National Park. Areas of suitable wolf habitat have recently increased to 87%, as a result of boundary extensions in Simien and the creation of the Arsi Mountains National Park.

Steps taken to ensure the survival of the Ethiopian wolf include dog vaccination campaigns in Bale, Menz, and Simien, sterilization programs for wolf-dog hybrids in Bale, rabies vaccination of wolves in parts of Bale, community and school education programs in Bale and Wollo, contributing to the running of national parks, and population monitoring and surveying. A 10-year national action plan was formed in February 2011.

The species' critical situation was first publicised by the Wildlife Conservation Society in 1983, with the Bale Mountains Research Project being established shortly after. This was followed by a detailed, four-year field study, which prompted the IUCN/SSC Canid Specialist Group to produce an action plan in 1997. The plan called for the education of people in wolf-inhabited areas, wolf population monitoring, and the stemming of rabies in dog populations. The Ethiopian Wolf Conservation Programme was formed in 1995 by Oxford University, with donors including the Born Free Foundation, Frankfurt Zoological Society, and the Wildlife Conservation Network.

The overall aim of the EWCP is to protect the wolf's Afroalpine habitat in Bale, and establish additional conservation areas in Menz and Wollo. The EWCP carries out education campaigns for people outside the wolf's range to improve dog husbandry and manage diseases within and around the park, as well as monitoring wolves in Bale, south and north Wollo. The program seeks to vaccinate up to 5,000 dogs a year to reduce rabies and distemper in wolf-inhabited areas.

In 2016, the Korean company Sooam Biotech was reported to be attempting to clone the Ethiopian wolf using dogs as surrogate mothers to help conserve the species.

== See also ==
- Black-backed jackal

== Cited works ==
- IUCN; SSC Canid Specialist Group (2011). Strategic Planning for Ethiopian Wolf Conservation (PDF). IUCN/SSC Canid Specialist Group. Oxford, United Kingdom. Archived from the original (PDF) on 2014-09-08.
- Lydekker, Richard (1908). The Game Animals of Africa. London, R. Ward, limited.
- Powell-Cotton, P. H. G. (1902). A sporting trip through Abyssinia: a narrative of a nine months' journey from the plains of the Hawash to the snows of Simien, with a description of the game, from elephant to ibex, and notes on the manners and customs of the natives. London : Rowland Ward.
- Rüppell, Eduard (1835). Neue Wirbelthiere zu der Fauna von Abyssinien gehörig, entdeckt und beschrieben (in German). Frankfurt am Main : S. Schmerber.
- Sillero-Zubiri, Claudio; MacDonald, David W. (1997). The Ethiopian Wolf: Status Survey and Conservation Action Plan (PDF). IUCN/SSC Canid Specialist Group. ISBN 978-2-8317-0407-4. Archived from the original (PDF) on 26 December 2011.
