= Simien Mountains =

Mountain range in the Ethiopian Highlands

- IUCN category II (national park)
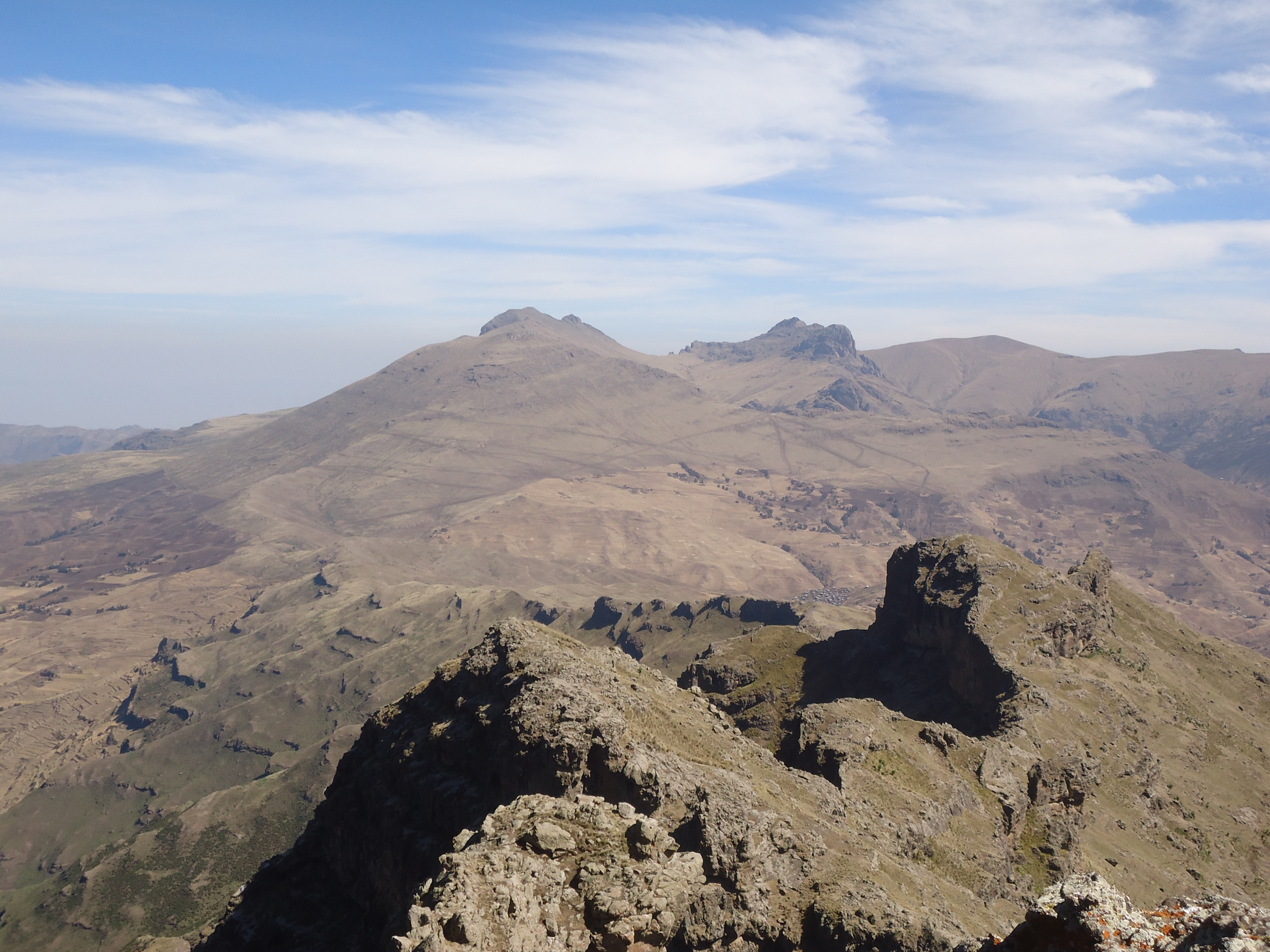

- Location within Ethiopia
- Location: Amhara Region, Ethiopia
- Nearest city: Debarq and Mekane Berhan
- Coordinates: 13°16′N 38°05′E
- Area: 220 km^{2} (85 sq mi)
- Established: 1969
- Visitors: 26,000 (in 2016)

UNESCO World Heritage Site
- Official name: Simien National Park
- Type: Natural
- Criteria: vii, x
- Designated: 1978 (2nd session)
- Reference no.: 9
- Region: Africa
- Endangered: 1996–2017

The Simien Mountains (Amharic: ሰሜን ተራራው, romanized: Semēn, lit. 'north mountain'; also spelled Semain, Simeon and Semien), in northern Ethiopia, northeast of Gondar in Amhara Region, are part of the Ethiopian Highlands. They are a World Heritage Site (since 1978) and are part of the Simien Mountains National Park. The mountains consist of plateaus separated by valleys and rising to pinnacles. The highest Ethiopian mountain is Ras Dejen at 4,550 m with the second highest peak of Kidis Yared at 4,453 m; other peaks include Mount Biuat at 4,437 m.

The Simien Mountains are remarkable for being one of the few spots in tropical Africa where snow regularly falls. Because of their geological origins, the mountains are almost unique, with only South Africa's Drakensberg range having been formed in the same manner and thus appearing similar. Animals in the mountains include the walia ibex, gelada, and caracal. There are a few Ethiopian wolves.

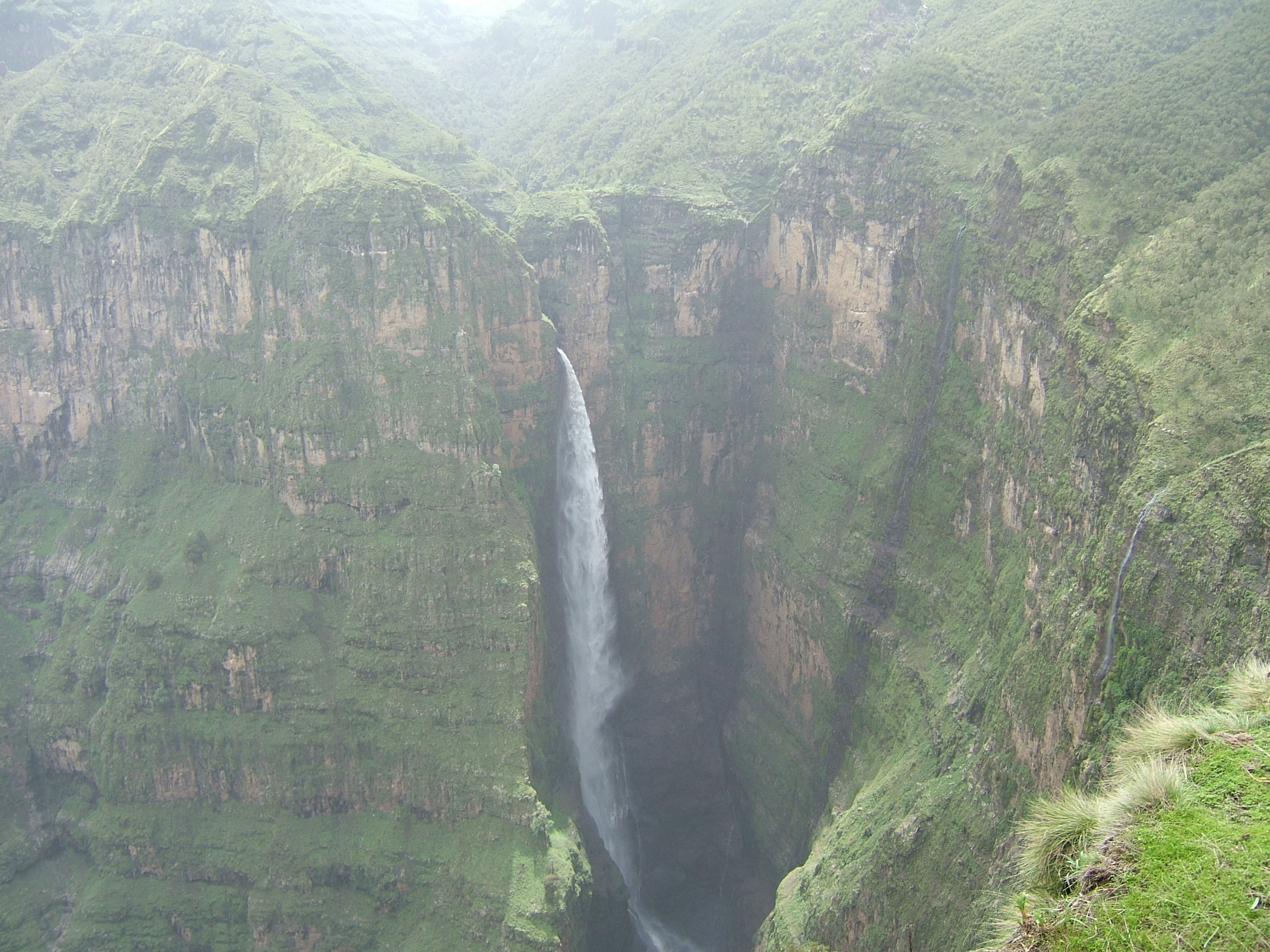
Jin Bahir Falls in the Simien Mountains, falling into the Geech Abyss, near Debarq.

The region received status as a biosphere reserve in 2017, aimed at safeguarding its exceptional ecosystems and cultural value while also advancing sustainable growth initiatives. The Simien Mountains National Park stands out for its peaks and deep valleys that attract hikers and nature lovers alike. Its renowned peak, Ras Dashen rising 4,550 meters (m) above sea level is not only Ethiopia's peak but also one of the tallest mountains in Africa.

== Etymology ==
Although the word Semien means "north" in Amharic, according to Richard Pankhurst the ancestral form of the word actually meant "south" in Ge'ez, because the mountains lay to the south of Axum. But over the following centuries the core of the Christian kingdom itself moved to the south, these mountains came to be thought of as lying to the north, and the meaning of the word likewise changed.

== Geology and landscape ==
The Simien Mountains were formed prior to the creation of the Rift Valley, from lava outpourings between 40 and 25 million years ago during the Oligocene period. The volcano is believed to have spread over more than 5000 m^{2} and resulted in a thick sequence of basaltic lava some 3,000-3,500 m thick that was deposited on Precambrian crystalline basement. The major part of the Simien Mountains consists of remnants of a Hawaiian-type shield volcano. The Kidus Yared peak is situated near the middle of the shield volcano. Ras Dejen (4,533 m), Bwahit (4,430 m) and Silki (4,420 m) were formed from the outer core of this ancient volcano.

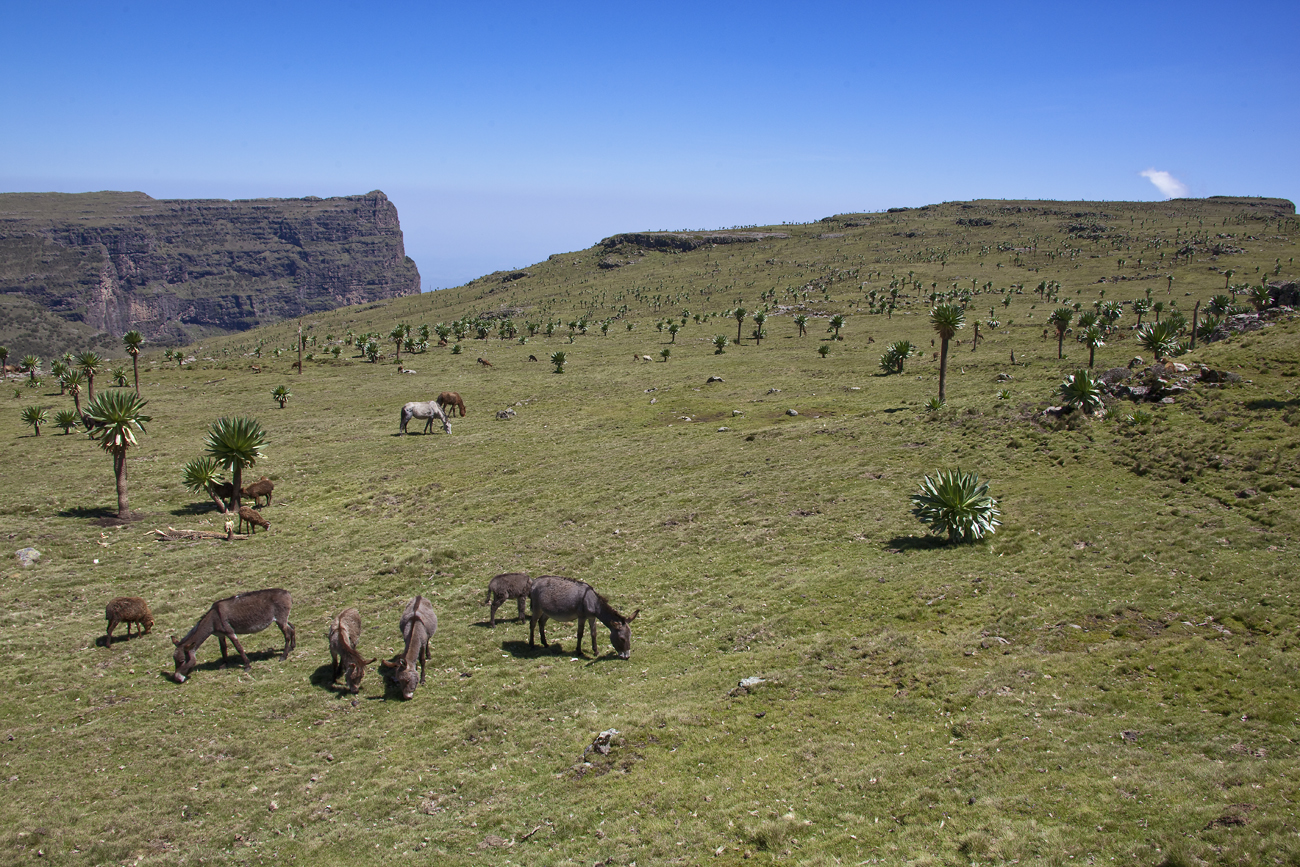

The extreme escarpment in Simien appears to be a precondition for the formation of the extended uplift of the whole mountain massif 75 million years ago. The dramatic views are due to this volcanic activity. Especially of note is the 2,000 m high escarpment extending in a southwest to northeast axis.

There are different types of soils as a result of the difference in geological formation, glaciations, topography, and climate. Humic Andosols are the dominant soil type which is mainly found at an altitude of 3,000 m. The other types of soils are shallow Andosols, Lithosols, and Haplic Phaeozems that are mainly common in the area between 2,500 and 3,500 m. The Simien Mountains are highly eroded as a result of human land use practices and as a result of the topography of the area.

== Fauna ==
The park hosts endangered animals, like the Walia ibex – a species of wild goat exclusively living in the Simien Mountains region. The Ethiopian wolf and the gelada baboon, a primate that feeds on grass, are also residents of this area.

== Culture ==
The Simien Mountains hold significance not for their wildlife but for their contributions to the local culture and agriculture scene. Local farmers have been utilizing the terraces etched into the mountainsides for generations with the region hosting villages where ancient farming techniques are still practiced.

== History ==
There is a note in Cosmas Indicopleustes' work that the Simien Mountains were a place of exile for subjects condemned to banishment by the Aksumite king.

First mentioned in the Monumentum Adulitanum of the 3rd century AD (which described them as "inaccessible mountains covered with snow" and where soldiers walked up to their knees in snow), the presence of snow was undeniably witnessed by the 17th century Jesuit priest Jerónimo Lobo. Although the later Scottish traveller James Bruce claims that he had never witnessed snow in the Simien Mountains, the 19th century explorer Henry Salt not only recorded that he saw snow there (on 9 April 1814), but explained the reason for Bruce's failure to see snow in these mountains – Bruce had ventured no further than the foothills of the Simiens.

Despite their ruggedness and altitude, the mountains are dotted with villages linked by tracks.

== Folklore ==
An old folklore superstition from the Semien mountains regarding certain trees called Genwarar was documented in Nathaniel Pearce's early 19th century journal. The Genwarar trees are seldom above eight feet in height, and from a distance could give the appearance or shape of a human being. The people would never cut these trees, owing to a superstitious belief that something bad would befall them as a consequence. Local traditions say the trees contain evil spirits, which have been cast out of human beings, and are harmless when not disturbed, however, when a tree is cut, the spirits enter a person out of vengeance, but in general not to those who cut them down. Aside from this, the trees produces a milky substance, which is used for ink, for the purpose of writing charms, to be worn on any part of the body as a cure for those possessed by evil spirits, and to prevent their entering those who are not previously tormented with them. The milk of the genwarar was also used in the treatment of lingering sickness.
