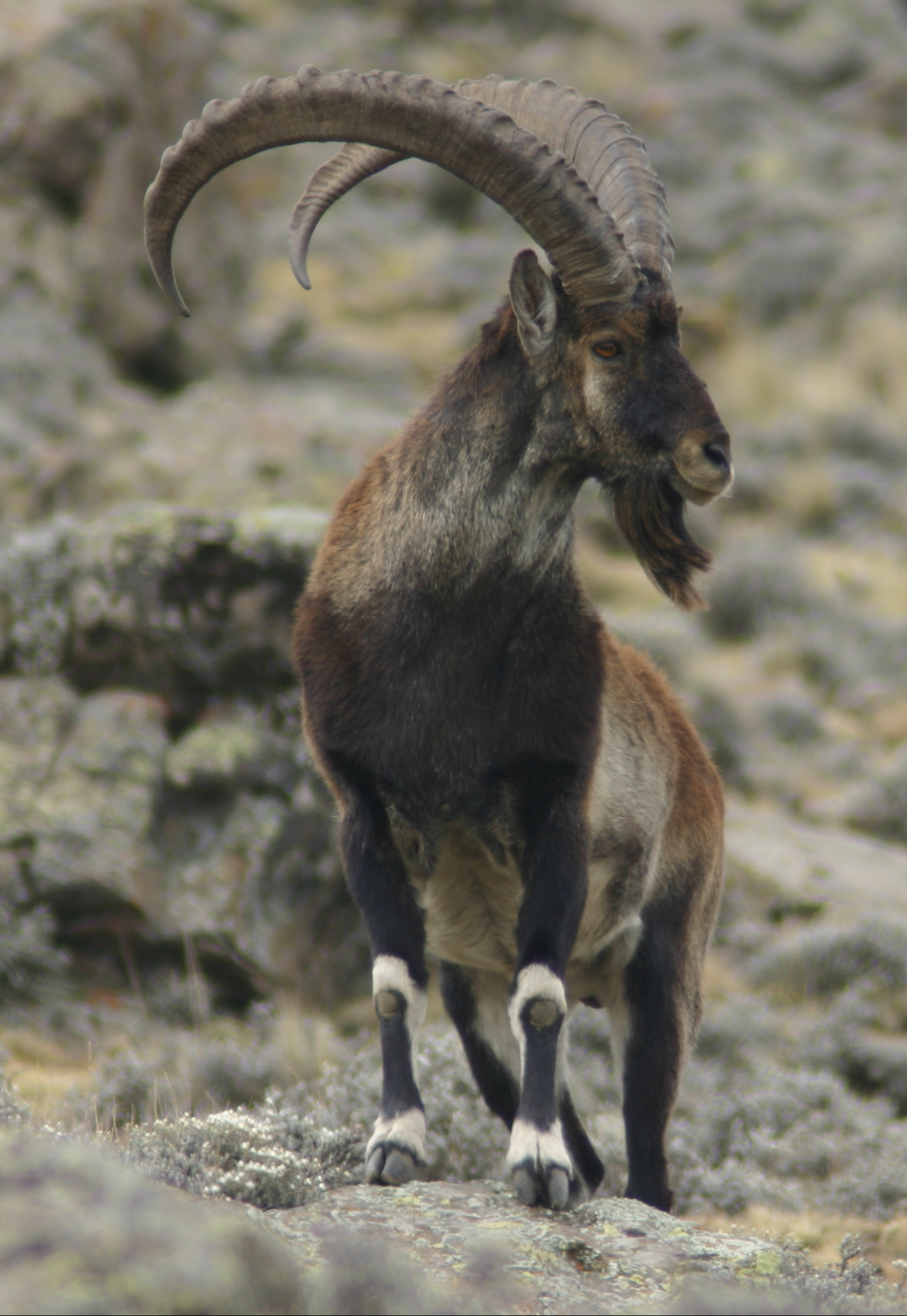
- Male
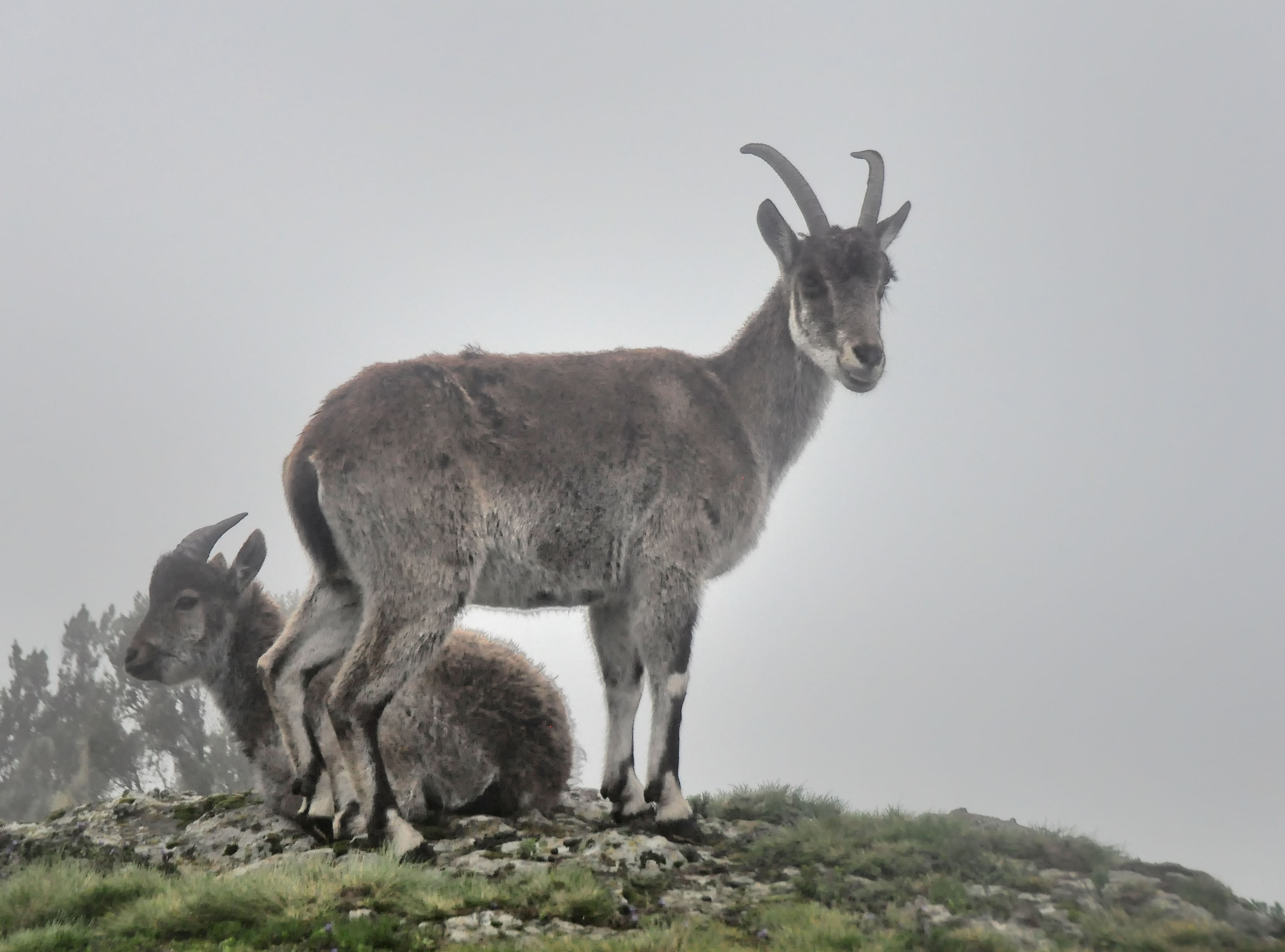
- Female with juvenile Semien Mountains National Park, Ethiopia

Conservation status
- Critically Endangered (IUCN 3.1)

Scientific classification
- Kingdom: Animalia
- Phylum: Chordata
- Class: Mammalia
- Order: Artiodactyla
- Family: Bovidae
- Subfamily: Caprinae
- Genus: Capra
- Species: C. walie

Binomial name
- Capra walie Rüppell, 1835
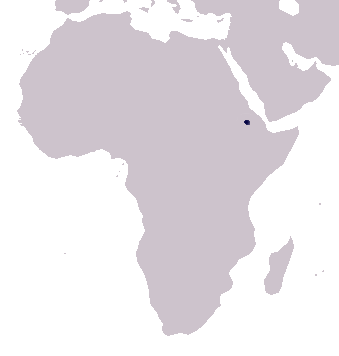
- Range of the walia ibex (in black)

= Walia ibex =

Species of mammal

The Walia ibex (Capra walie, Amharic: ዋልያ wālyā) is a critically endangered species of ibex. It is sometimes considered an endemic subspecies of the Alpine ibex. If the population were to increase, the surrounding mountain habitat would be sufficient to sustain only 2,000 ibex. The adult Walia ibex's only known wild predators are the hyena and leopard. However, young ibex are often hunted by a variety of fox and cat species. The ibex are members of the goat family, and the Walia ibex is the southernmost of today's ibexes. In the late 1990s, the Walia ibex went from endangered to critically endangered due to the declining population. The Walia ibex is also known as the Abyssinian ibex. Given the small distribution range of the Walia ibex in its restricted mountain ecosystem, the presence of many domestic goats may pose a serious threat that can directly affect the population's survival.

== Appearance ==
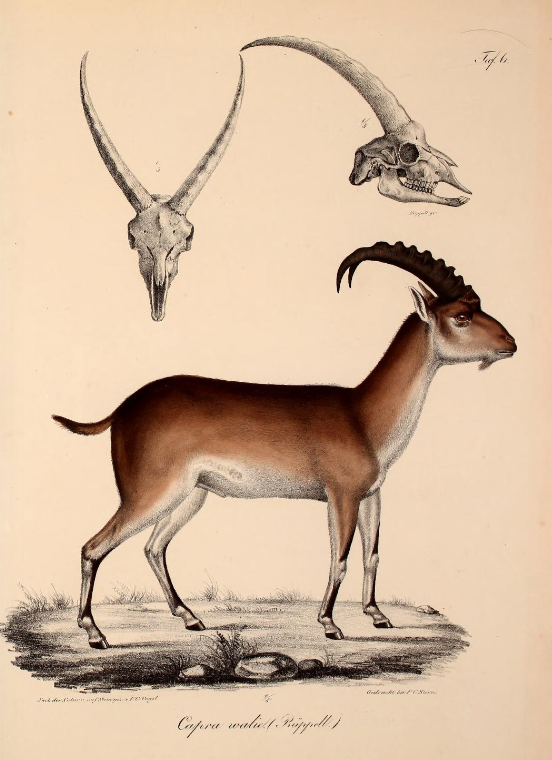
Rüppell's depiction of the species (1835).

These animals have a chocolate-brown to chestnut-brown coat coloration, greyish-brown muzzle, and a lighter grey in the eyes and legs. The belly and insides of the legs are white, and black and white patterns stretch upon the legs of these animals. The males weigh 80–125 kg (180–280 lb) and have very large horns which curve backwards, reaching lengths up to 110 cm (43 in).

== Habitat and ecology ==
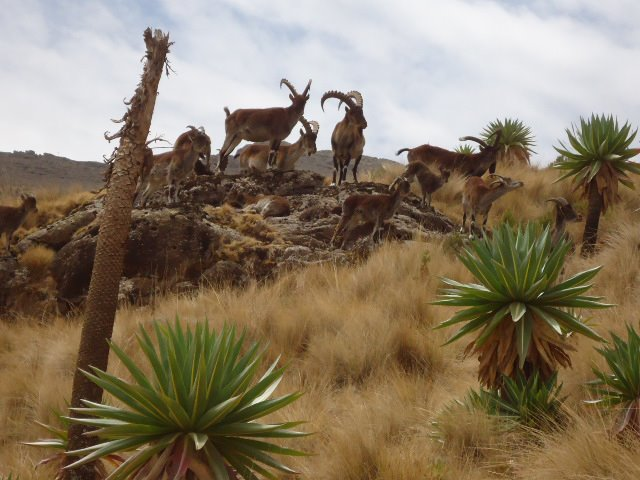
A group of Walia ibex, Semien Mountains, Ethiopia.

The Walia ibex lives in very steep, rocky cliff areas between 2,500 and 4,500 m (8,200 and 14,800 ft) high. Their habitats are mountain forests, subalpine grasslands, and scrub. They are grazers. Their diets include bushes, herbs, lichens, shrubs, grasses, and creepers. They often stand on their hind legs to get to young shoots of giant heath. Walia ibex are most active in the morning and evening and will rest in the sun on rock ledges. Males live in bachelor groups and females live in groups with their offspring. Mating season is at the summit from March to May. Males compete for females by ramming their horns with amazing force. Gestation periods last 150–165 days. They reach sexual maturity at one year of age.

== Threats ==
This species is found only in the northern mountains of Ethiopia. Once widespread in the Simien Mountains, the numbers dropped during the 20th century. Only 200–250 animals were surviving in 1994–1996, but recently the population has somewhat increased to about 500 individuals in 2004. Habitat loss and hunting are major threats to the species. The encroaching settlement, livestock grazing, and cultivation are also big problems. Road construction is also fragmenting their habitat. The pressure and competition for natural resources have seen a constant increase in the past decades. Not only from livestock but also human agriculture and needs. This increase has affected the rate of interbreeding, survival, and expansion of the population. This impact has seen the endangerment level continue to rise and fewer and fewer resources are available for the native species to sustain their presence (Alemayehu et al, 2011). The most important stronghold for their survival is now the 13,600 ha (34,000 acres) sized Semien National Park which was established in 1969. The Walia ibex is considered to be vulnerable by the IUCN and needs further conservation measures to survive. Since no captive population is kept anywhere in the world, the IUCN recommends capturing a few individuals to form the nucleus of a captive breeding group.
