= Mekane Berhan =

Town in Amhara Region, Ethiopia

- Town
- Location in Ethiopia
- Coordinates: 12°59′N 38°07′E
- Country: Ethiopia
- Region: Amhara
- Zone: Semien Gondar
- Elevation: 2,900 m (9,500 ft)

Population (2005)
  - Total: 2,717 (est)
- Time zone: UTC+3 (EAT)

Mekane Berhan (Ge'ez: መካነ ብርሃን mekāne birhān, "Place of light") is a town in northern Ethiopia. Located in the Semien Gondar Zone of the Amhara Region, Mekane Berhan has a latitude and longitude of 12°59′N 38°07′E with an elevation of approximately 2900 meters above sea level. It is the administrative center of Jan Amora woreda.

An all-weather road connects Mekane Berhan to Debarq, which makes the town far more accessible than the rest of the woreda. The road's construction began in the late 1990s, and by 1999 85 kilometers had been completed; the remaining 20 kilometers were expected to be constructed the following year.

Mekane Berhan is best known as the location of the Derasge Mariam church where Tewodros II was crowned emperor 11 February 1855. According to local tradition, following his victory over Wube Haile Maryam he discovered that Wube had prepared the church for his coronation as Emperor and invited numerous dignitaries from all over Ethiopia, and since he planned on becoming Emperor, Tewodros decided not to let such elaborate preparations to waste and had himself crowned Emperor instead. Dervla Murphy described her January 1967 visit to this town in her travel memoir In Ethiopia with a Mule.

== Demographics ==
Based on figures from the Central Statistical Agency in 2005, this town has an estimated total population of 2,717, of whom 1,182 are men and 1,535 are women. The 1994 census reported this town had a total population of 1584, of whom 622 were men and 962 were women.
