= Este (woreda) =

Coordinates: 11°40′N 38°10′E

Este was one of the 105 woredas in the Amhara Region of Ethiopia. Part of the Debub Gondar Zone, Este was bordered on the south by the Abay River which separated it from the Misraq Gojjam Zone, on the west by Dera, on the northwest by Fogera, on the north by Farta, on the northeast by Lay Gayint, and on the east by Simada; part of this woreda's boundary with Simada was defined by the Wanka, a tributary of the Abay. Towns in Este included Jara Gedo and Mekane Yesus, as well as the historic settlement of Mahdere Maryam. Este was divided for Mirab Este and Misraq Este woredas.

== Overview ==
The woreda is one of the most abandoned place by the regime in power. The woreda went to spend for about 20 years in darkness, after losing a generator that lit up about 10,000 households. Even if there are some minor changes and development, Estie is still relatively underdeveloped when compared to the national average. The woreda is known for its agricultural product and huge market. Estie densa, a mountain just outside the city of mekane eyesus, is the brand of the woreda with chena and wanka, the two year round rivers, flowing down south to the east and west of the woreda. The Sabero Dilde (also known as the "Second Portuguese Bridge" or the "Broken Bridge") crosses the Abay here, connecting Este with Hulet Ej Enese, a woreda in Misraq Gojjam.

On 15 October 2002, police fired into the air to disperse a crowd of 4,000 farmers gathered at a meeting of the Ethiopian Democratic Unity Party in the village of Dankura Maryam, although party officials maintained they had a valid permit for their meeting. Police beat many of the farmers, injuring 50 seriously, and kept dozens in detention for a week.

== Demographics ==
Based on figures published by the Central Statistical Agency in 2005, this woreda has an estimated total population of 403,956, of whom 199,325 are men and 204,631 are women; 16,014 or 3.96% of its population are urban dwellers, which is less than the Zone average of 8.3%. With an estimated area of 2,368.13 square kilometers, Este has an estimated population density of 170.6 people per square kilometer, which is greater than the Zone average of 169.21.

The 1994 national census reported a total population for this woreda of 296,978 in 62,267 households, of whom 152,046 were men and 144,932 were women; 10,714 or 3.61% of its population were urban dwellers. The largest ethnic group reported in Este was the Amhara (99.98%), and Amharic was spoken as a first language by 99.98%. The majority of the inhabitants were Ethiopian Orthodox Christianity, with 96.53% of the population reporting they observed this belief, while 3.45% of the population said they were Muslim.
