= Gebre Hanna =

Ethiopian poet, scholar and religious preacher (1821–1902)

Aleqa Gebre Hanna
- Born: November 1821; Fogera, Lake Tana, Gondar Province, Ethiopian Empire
- Died: 1902 (aged 80–81)
- Occupations: Poet; religious preacher; scholar

Aleqa Gebre Hanna (Ge'ez: አለቃ ገብረ ሀና; November 1821 – 1902) was an Ethiopian poet, scholar and religious preacher in 19th-century renowned in Amharic oral tradition for (to quote Donald Levine) his "quick and biting wit." He was a master of the genre of Amharic poetry known as qene, as well as introducing a new style of ceremonial dancing to the Ethiopian Church.

== Life ==
Of Amhara descent, Gebre Hanna was born in November 1821 in Fogera, a district on the eastern shore of Lake Tana, and his interest in religious learning brought him to the city of Gondar towards the end of the Zemene Mesafint, where he became a teacher at the Church of Ba'eta Maryam in the city and eventually its aleqa.

While at Baeta Maryam, Aleqa Gebre Hanna invented a new style of religious dancing, known as Ya-Takla after his son. The Ethiopian Church is unique amongst Christian traditions in its traditional incorporation of ritual dances (known as aquaquam) in its ceremonies, which were performed by dabtaras. As Levine describes Aleqa Gebre Hanna's innovation:

In the traditional style of aquaquam, the bodies and sticks of the dancers move up and down, punctuating the flow of chant with alternatively gradual and abrupt movements. Alaqā Gebre Hānnā, inspired by the lateral movement of the waves of Lake Ṭānā and the bamboo reeds in the breeze at its shore, taught that bodies should sway from side to side. This innovation was rejected by the conservative clergy at Gondar, but it was carried by his son Taklē to Dābra Tabor and from there spread elsewhere.

According to the one-time Ethiopian ambassador to the United States, Berhanu Denqe, who had received his education there, Aleqa Gebre was one of the teachers at the church school of Saint Raguel on Mount Entoto. He was often a guest of the Emperor Menelik II and his wife Empress Taytu, and his exchanges with these monarchs are the setting for many of the stories told about him.

== His wit ==
As Simon Messing explains,

The Amharic language lends itself readily to puns and hidden meanings, since many verbs have double or triple interpretations due to the hidden variations in the basic verbal stem and the absence or presence of gemination of some consonants. The listener must pay close attention. If he misinterprets the context and fails to discern the pun, he is often made the butt of the next tricky joke by those who have heard it before. The more a storyteller and wit masters the sowaso 'grammar' of the Amharic language, the better he can manipulate the humor. Alaqa Gabra Hanna was a master of the sowaso grammar, as demonstrated by one of his best-known stories. One day the Alaqa encountered a peasant with his donkey, and bowing low asked greeted him with Endet adaratchu? ("How did you sleep?") Only afterwards, as the man told of the encounter did he realize that the Alaqa had used the plural form of "you", not the singular: Alaqa Gabra Hanna spoke to the donkey and its owner as equals.

Tales involving Aleqa Gebre Hanna are numerous. Levine notes that in a published collection of 300 old folktales and anecdotes, no less than one quarter are devoted to stories about the Alaqa. Other stories involving the Alaqa include:

- One time, travelling through the valley of the Abay River with a purse full of Maria Theresa thalers, he spotted a band of shiftas or bandits waiting to waylay travellers. He quickly hid his purse in a gourd containing linseed, wrapped them both in a piece of colorful imported silk, arranging them to resemble a tabot, which he then placed on his head—the traditional manner how Ethiopian priests carry them. Borrowing the largest cross his companions had, he passed himself as a priest. When asked to which saint the tabot had been consecrated, the Aleqa told them Qeddus Giyorgis—Saint George, the most common saint in Ethiopia. When asked which one, without missing a beat he replied, "St. George of the linseed paste."

The outlaws not only believed him, but escorted him to the top of the valley, explaining that the area was full of gangs of bandits. Days later they learned the truth.

- Homesick for his native Gondar, Aleqa Gebre Hanna obtained permission to leave the court of Emperor Menelik, and had organized his party to leave that morning when he saw two fat cows being led to slaughter. Mindful of the long trip ahead of him without fresh beef, he decided to wait to obtain a good share of the meat, which was being parcelled out. Having meat, he now needed drink and obtained a jugful of tej, and spent the day feasting.

Late afternoon found the Aleqa still in the capital, when the Emperor Menelik happened upon him. Surprised to find the homesick man still in the capital, Menelik addressed him: "I gave you permission to go, and you are still here?" Aleqa Gebre Hanna's wit did not fail him: "The cows were entering, your majesty." (The pun is lost in translation: as Messing explains, the Amharic phrase "the cows were entering" [Lam gab] is often used to indicate night has fallen, when the cows come home and a time too late to begin a journey. "The cows had indeed 'entered', i.e. into the stomach of Alaqa Gabre Hanna; and no one could accuse him later of having told a lie to the Emperor.")

- At one point while he was in Gondar, Aleqa Gebre Hanna found himself without any money. So he sent a messenger to tell Emperor Menelik II that the Aleqa was dead, and his family had no money to give him a proper tazkar or wake. When the Empress Taytu heard this report, she went to the Emperor and wailed and berated the man until he sent money to Gondar.

Eventually, Aleqa Gebre Hanna found need to return to Menelik's capital. There are a number of variants of how he explained the fact he had not died to his imperial patrons. One tells that, the Emperor saw him and after recovering from the shock asked sarcastically, "How is it that the dead arise from the dead?" The Aleqa replied, with a deep bow, "Your majesty, it is not uncommon in our Christian religion to arise from the dead." Another has him explaining, "Your majesty, I so longed to see the faces of your Majesties again that I was not at peace in the earth and had to so return." A third gives his explanation that "they had so many rules and regulations up there [pointing to heaven] that I preferred to return and live under the rules of your Majesty."

- One day, his wife left Aleqa Gebre Hanna home with their baby on a lengthy errand. Taking the infant with him, he used this opportunity to visit his current girl friend who had a child of about the same age, and spent the afternoon with her. However upon leaving her, he took the wrong child home with him. Before he could exchange the infants, his wife returned home and recognized the baby of her current rival. Becoming angry, she said, "This thing is not my baby! Shall I throw it in the fire?" Quite calmly Aleqa Gebre Hanna replied, "There is also a fire in the house of his mother."
