= List of districts in the Amhara region =

List of districts of the Amhara Region of Ethiopia

This article provides a list of the districts of the Amhara Region of Ethiopia.

== Defunct woredas ==
- Achefer
- Angolalla Terana Asagirt
- Artuma Fursina Jile
- Banja
- Belessa
- Bure Wemberma
- Chefe Golana Dewerahmedo
- Dawuntna Delant
- Gera Midirna Keya Gebriel
- Mam Midrina Lalo Midir
- Sanja
- Simada
- Estie
- Tachi Gayinit
- Lay Gayint
- Sedie
- Muja
- Farta
