= Fogera =

District in Amhara Region, Ethiopia

Coordinates: 11°58′N 37°41′E

Fogera ፎገራ
- Woreda
- Flag
- Interactive map of Fogera
- Zone: Debub Gondar
- Region: Amhara

Area
  - Total: 1,111.43 km^{2} (429.13 sq mi)

Population (2012 est.)
  - Total: 249,826
  - Density: 224.78/km^{2} (582.18/sq mi)

Fogera (Amharic: ፎገራ) is a woreda in Amhara Region, Ethiopia. Fogera is part of the Debub Gondar Zone. The district is bordered on the south by Dera, on the west by Lake Tana on the north by the Reb which separates it from Kemekem, on the northeast by Ebenat, and on the east by Farta.

The administrative center for this woreda is Wereta City. Other cities in Fogera include Alem Ber city.

== Geography and climate ==
The altitude of this woreda ranges from 1774 to 2415 meters above sea level. Rivers in Fogera include the Gumara and the Reb, both of which drain into Lake Tana. A survey of the land in Fogera shows that 44.2% is arable or cultivable and another 20% is irrigated, 22.9% is used for pasture, 1.8% has forest or shrubland, 3.7% is covered with water, and the remaining 7.4% is considered degraded or other.

Some 490 square kilometers of land adjacent to Lake Tana is subject to regular and severe flooding. The woreda was heavily affected by the flash floods in Ethiopia that in September 2006. The heavy rain caused Lake Tana to overflow its banks, making thousands of people homeless. "Thousands of heads of cattle, whole silos of grain, and significant tracts of grazing and farmland have been washed away," according to IRIN.

Fogera has 55 kilometers of dry-weather road and 67 kilometers of all-weather road, for an average of road density of 111 kilometers per 1000 square kilometers.

== Economy ==
Teff, corn, sorghum, cotton and sesame are important cash crops as is rice which was first introduced in the 1980s and is now one of the major rice growing areas in Ethiopia. Fogera is also known for its breed of cattle, which has a large frame and is one of the best native milk cows in Ethiopia; however, because other breeds of cattle are brought from Dera and Kemekem woredas to the Fogera plains in the dry season, the local breed is at risk of genetic dilution.

There are 16 co-operatives, 9 of which are multi-purpose, 4 irrigation and 3 financial cooperatives. The multi-purpose cooperatives provide milling service, sell basic household goods, and distribute agricultural inputs in collaboration with the Agricultural Input Supply Corporation and the Ambasel and Merkeb Union cooperatives. Also located in this woreda is the community of Awra Amba, an Ethiopian grass-roots experiment in egalitarian living.

One micro-finance institution operates in this woreda: the Amhara Credit and Saving Institution SC (ACSI), established in 1998. ACSI has extended loans totaling 8,678,581 Birr to 5,484 people for farm-related purposes; of these, 53 people defaulted on loans totaling 24,725.30 Birr.

== Demographics ==
A 2012 estimate puts the population at 249,826. This gives a population density of 224.78 people per square kilometer (582.18 people per square mile), given its area of 1,111.43 square kilometers (429.13 square miles), higher than the South Gondar Zone average of 158.85 people per square kilometer (411.43 people per square mile).

Based on 2007 national census conducted by the Central Statistical Agency of Ethiopia (CSA), this woreda has a total population of 228,449. This is an increase of 23.30% over the 1994 census showing of 185,280 inhabitants. By gender, the population has held steady in a split of about 51% male to 49% female. Urbanization is increasing, with urban dwellers reported at 9.92% of the population (18,375 persons) in 1994 but 11.03% of the population (25,190 persons) in 2007.

With an area of 1,111.43 square kilometers, Fogera has a population density of 205.55, which is greater than the Zone average of 145.56 persons per square kilometer. A total of 52,905 households were counted in this woreda, resulting in an average of 4.32 persons to a household. This is a 38% increase in households from 1994 (37,258 households). The 2007 census reported 51,504 housing units in the woreda.

The largest ethnic group reported in Fogera was the Amhara (99.83%). Amharic was spoken as a first language by 99.89% of the reported population.

The majority of the inhabitants practice Ethiopian Orthodox Christianity, with 95–96% of the population reporting that belief. Another 4–5% report as Muslim.

Fogera is known as the birthplace of the well-known Ethiopian dabtara and wit, Aleqa Gebre Hanna.
