= Alaqa Taye Gabra Mariam =

Ethiopian scholar, teacher, writer and preacher (1861–1924)

Taye Gabra Mariam
- Born: March 1861; Kamkam Qaroda, Yifag, Begemder, Ethiopian Empire
- Died: August 1924 (aged 63)

Aleqa Taye Gabra Mariam (Ge'ez: አለቃ ታየ ገብረ ማርያም ālek’a taye gebire mariyami, March 1861 – August 1924) was an Ethiopian scholar, teacher, writer and preacher.

== Background and education ==
Taye was born in Kamkam Qaroda, Yifag in the Begemder province in March 1861. He initially began his education in a church school but this was interrupted when his father and uncle left the province and his mother died in an epidemic in 1867. Taye wandered in search of his father and uncle and reached as far as Massawa, soon afterwards enrolling in a Swedish Evangelical mission school in nearby Monkulu in 1874. The mission did not employ Taye for translating and teaching work until 1886. He would later return to his home province in 1875. Taye's education allowed him to become proficient in the Ge'ez language as well as the teachings of the Ethiopian Orthodox Church.

Taye returned to Monkulu in 1880 and became a teacher as well as a preacher for the next 20 years. He had gained a reputation for learning by the time he returned to Begemder in 1889.

== Writings and teachings ==
During the 1890s Taye was working on a Grammar Book (Matshafa Sawasew) which was eventually published in Monkullo in 1897. The book was written in Amharic and explained the grammar of Ge'ez and also included a Ge'ez vocabulary with Amharic translation.

Ras Mangasha Atikem, the governor of Bagemder, was impressed by Taye's skill and his book Matshafa Sawasew and recommended him to Emperor Menelik II. The emperor commissioned Taye to write a history of Ethiopia and would later award him with a gold medal. Taye's first published historical work was a social history of Ethiopia in 1922 titled Ya-Ityopya Hizb Tarik ("History of the People of Ethiopia"). Taye also wrote a general history of Ethiopia but died before it could be published.

Taye was sent by Menelik II in 1905 to Germany on the request of Wilhelm II, who wanted an Ethiopian scholar to catalogue Ethiopian manuscripts and teach Ge'ez at the University of Berlin. Menelik may have done this partly because of his own interest in recovering rare Ethiopian books from Germany. Taye would bring back around 130 Ethiopian books on his return from Germany.

Alaqa Taye helped contribute two books to the New York Public Library on Abyssinian children's games and folk stories.

=== History of the People of Ethiopia ===
Ya-Ityopya Hizb Tarik ("History of the People of Ethiopia") was published in 1922 and was Taye's first published historical work. The book was reprinted with some changes multiple times over the years, in 1927, 1953, 1955, 1962, 1965 and 1971, with its first English translation appearing in 1987 based on the first edition. It is largely a collection of legends and folk histories on the different peoples in Ethiopia. The book used several Ethiopian and European sources and was referred to by Heruy Wolde Selassie in one of his books. It was intended to be part of a larger work which looked at the history of the world, the history of Ethiopia and then finally the history of the Ethiopian kings, but this was interrupted by the Italian occupation of Ethiopia in 1935.

Ya-Ityopya Hizb Tarik has been influential and is the source of much oral history in Ethiopia in recent decades. It was used for many years in the teaching of Amharic and Ethiopian history in public schools. It was purchased in large numbers in the 1960s by the Ethiopian Government Ministry of Education.

There is controversy over who is truly the author of the book. Heruy Wolde Selassie gave the book to the press and a type-script of the book is attributed to Selassie, but friends and family of Alaqa Taye claim the book was written by Taye, not Selassie. In recent years, there has been more credible and conclusive evidence that some of Alaqa Taye's manuscripts were acquired by Heruy Wolde Selassie and published as his own works, such as his book Wazema. Ethiopian historian Sergew Hable Selassie felt this book did not "do justice to [Taye's] erudition and does not reflect his true ability", as it was based on "unreliable sources" and was "not at all systematic".

Ya-Ityopya Hizb Tarik was essentially the eighth and ninth chapters of a much longer work titled Ya-Ityopya Mangist Tarik ("History of the Ethiopian State") which Taye began work on at the request of Menelik II, possibly as early as 1898. The first 21 chapters and part of the 22nd are preserved in manuscripts in the library of the Ethiopian Monastery in Jerusalem and microfilms of which are held at the Hill Monastic Manuscript Library in the College of Saint Benedict and Saint John's University. Relatives and friends of Taye believe the work was sent to press in 1935 by Heruy Wolde Selassie under the title of "History of Ethiopia" or "History of Ethiopian Kings" but was never completed because of the Second Italo-Ethiopian War.

== Religion ==
Alaqa Taye went on an evangelical mission to Qaroda in 1898 but his teaching incited opposition against him. He was brought before the court of the Bagemder governor Ras Mangasha Atikem, but won the case.

Taye was viewed by the Ethiopian Orthodox clergy as a heretic due to his Protestant beliefs, but was initially protected by the Emperor Menelik II. The Abuna questioned Taye several times on his faith. After Menelik II fell ill in 1909, Taye was accused of professing the religion of Tsara Mariam ("Enemies of Mary") at the court of Ras Walda Giyorgis, governor of Bagemder. He was arrested in December 1910 to be put in prison in Addis Ababa. Taye was however happy to teach the other prisoners and was later confined outside of prison. He was later released from prison in 1918 and reinstated as an official author for the Ethiopian government. The decision to place Taye in prison may have been influenced by the fact that Empress Taytu Betul was administrating the empire during the illness of her husband and she was the head of the traditional Orthodox nobility.

While Taye faced persecution during the regency of Empress Taytu Betul during her husband Menelik II's illness, he had a relatively peaceful time during the reigns of Lij Iyasu and Zewditu and the prince regent Ras Tafari Makannon. Tafari was liberal in his religious policies and employed Taye as a political advisor.

Two unpublished works – "Dictionary" and "Remedy for the Soul" – refute elements and practices of the Orthodox doctrine.

In the 1920s, he preached at the Protestant church of Makana Yesus in Addis Ababa.

== Personal life and death ==
Alaqa Taye was due to marry a woman named Tirunesh in Monkullo in February 1889, but she died four days before the wedding. He later married a woman named Tsehayitu, who died several years later. His last wife was Waizaro Tirunash, whom he was married to for six months before his own death. He had no children from any of his marriages.

Taye died in August 1924. His religious opponents refused to allow him to be buried at the Orthodox Church of Selassie and an order from Empress Zewditu authorising the burial had no effect. His body was instead taken to Gulale, the burial place for Catholics.

== List of works ==
- "The Image of Jesus", Monkullo, 1894
- Matshafa Sawasew ("Grammar Book"), Monkullo, 1897
- "Gospel of John", Monkullo, 1910
- "Psalm of Christ, Portrait of Jesus, Portrait of the Saviour of the World", Asmara, 1911
- Mazmura Krestos ("The Psalter of Christ"), Asmara, 1913
- Ya-Ityopya Hizb Tarik ("History of the Ethiopian People"), Addis Ababa, 1922
- Mezigebe K'alati ("Dictionary") (unpublished)
- "Remedy for the Soul" (unpublished)

== See also ==
- Heruy Wolde Selassie

== Bibliography ==
- Esheté, Alemé (1971–1972). "Alaqa Taye Gabra Mariam (1861–1924)". Rassegna di Studi Etiopici. 25: 14–30. JSTOR 41299618.
- Tafla, Bairu. "Gabra-Maryam, Alaqa Tayye". Dictionary of African Christian Biography.
- Gabra Maryam, Alaqa Tayya (1987). History of the People of Ethiopia. Translated by Grover Hudson; Tekeste Negash. Uppsala: Centre for Multiethnic Research (Uppsala University – Faculty of Arts). ISBN 91-86624-12-1. ISSN 0281-448X.
