= Ebenat (woreda) =

Coordinates: 12°10′N 38°05′E

Ebenat እብናት
- Woreda
- Flag
- Interactive map of Ebenat
- Zone: Debub Gondar
- Region: Amhara Region

Area
  - Total: 2,481.15 km^{2} (957.98 sq mi)

Population (2012 est.)
  - Total: 238,914
  - Density: 96.29/km^{2} (249.39/sq mi)

Ebenat (Amharic: እብናት) also spelled Ibnat is one of the woredas in the Amhara Region of Ethiopia. It is named after the former district that lay roughly in the same area; the woreda itself dates from

the mid-1960s. Part of the Debub Gondar Zone, Ebenat is bordered on the south by Farta, on the southwest by Fogera, on the west by Libo Kemekem, on the north by the Semien Gondar Zone, on the northeast by the Wag Hemra Zone, on the east by Semine (North) Wollo Zone, and on the southeast by Lay Gayint. The administrative center of Ebenat is Ebenat.

== Demographics ==
A 2012 estimate puts the population at 238,914. This gives a population density of 96.29 people per square kilometer (249.39 people per square mile), given its area of 1,481.15 square kilometers (957.98 square miles), much lower than the South Gondar Zone average of 158.85 people per square kilometer (411.43 people per square mile).

Based on the 2007 national census conducted by the Central Statistical Agency of Ethiopia (CSA), this woreda has a total population of 220,177, an increase of 34.74% over the 1994 census, of whom 112,151 are men and 108,026 women; 12,002 or 5.45% are urban inhabitants. With an area of 2,481.15 square kilometers, Ebenat has a population density of 88.74, which is less than the Zone average of 145.56 persons per square kilometer. A total of 50,600 households were counted in this woreda, resulting in an average of 4.35 persons to a household, and 49,215 housing units.

The 1994 national census reported a total population for this woreda of 163,413 in 33,972 households, of whom 83,861 were men and 79,552 were women; 9,704 or 5.94% of its population were urban dwellers.

The largest ethnic group reported in 1994 in Ebenat was the Amhara (99.92%). Amharic was spoken as a first language by 99.94%. The majority of the population practiced Ethiopian Orthodox Christianity with 98.31% reporting that as their belief, while 1.65% of the population said they were Muslim. By 2007 this had changed very little, with 98.15% reporting Ethiopian Orthodox Christianity as their religion, while 1.39% of the population said they were Muslim.
