= Ebenat =

Ebnat(Ibnat) (Amharic: እብናት) is a town in the South Gondar Zone of the Amhara Region, Ebnat has a latitude and longitude of 12°7′N 38°3′E. It is the administrative center of Ebnat woreda and is at an elevation of 2972 meters above sea level.

== History ==
Near Ebenat, on 17 January 1608, Emperor Susenyos and his army battled an invading Oromo army; the Emperor's army killed 12,000 Oromo at a cost of 400 of their comrades.

When Charles Beke left Ethiopia he stayed in Ebenat from 15 to 21 March 1843. Beke described the town as "a place of no size, consisting merely of the residences of the Dejazmach and his family, with a few huts for their attendants. The market is however, very considerable – lasting two days, Friday and Saturday – it being the point where the merchants of Gojam meet those from Sokota bringing salt, for which they give cloths, coffee, and a large number of cattle, oxen, and heifers brought from Gudera."

== Demographics ==
Based on figures from the Central Statistical Agency in 2005, Ebenat has an estimated total population of 16,740 of whom 7,832 are men and 8,908 are women. The 1994 census reported this town had a total population of 9,704 of whom 4,121 were men and 5,583 were women.
