= Dehana =

Coordinates: 12°40′N 38°30′E

Dehana ደኸና
- Woreda
- Flag
- Interactive map of Dehana
- Zone: Wag Hemra
- Region: Amhara Region

Area
  - Total: 1,643.07 km^{2} (634.39 sq mi)

Population (2012 est.)
  - Total: 118,793
  - Density: 72.30/km^{2} (187.26/sq mi)

Dehana (Amharic: ደኸና, “Poor Come Here”) is one of the woredas in the Amhara Region of Ethiopia. It is named for one of the five clans of the Agaw. Part of the Wag Hemra Zone, Dehana is bordered on the south by the Semien (North) Wollo Zone, on the west by the Tekezé River which separates it from the Debub (South) Gondar Zone and the Semien (North) Gondar Zone, on the north by Zikuala, on the northeast by Soqota, and on the east by Gazbibla. The Gazbibla woreda was separated from Dehana.

The major town in Dehana is Amde Werq.

== History ==
The Orthodox Tewahedo saint Iyasus Mo'a was born in "Dehana," which may have been this woreda, although G.W.B. Huntingford identifies it with Dahna, a village 15 miles east of the Tekeze River.

The Battle of Qwila, where Wagshum Gobeze defeated and killed his rival Tiso Gobeze of Welkait in late 1867, was fought in this woreda.

== Demographics ==
A 2012 estimate puts the population at 118,793. This gives a population density of 72.30 people per square kilometer (197.26 people per square mile), given its area of 1,643.07 square kilometers (634.39 square miles), higher than the Wag Hemra Zone average of 51.28 people per square kilometer (132.81 people per square mile).

Based on the 2007 national census conducted by the Central Statistical Agency of Ethiopia (CSA), this woreda has a total population of 109,725, an increase of 13.67% over the 1994 census, of whom 54,658 are men and 55,067 women; 4,207 or 3.83% are urban inhabitants. With an area of 1,643.07 square kilometers, Dehana has a population density of 66.78, which is greater than the Zone average of 47.15 persons per square kilometer. A total of 26,436 households were counted in this woreda, resulting in an average of 4.15 persons to a household, and 25,520 housing units. The 1994 national census reported a total population for this woreda of 96,526 in 23,987 households, of whom 48,613 were men and 47,913 were women; 2,084 or 2.16% of its population were urban dwellers.

In 1994 the two largest ethnic groups reported in Dehana were the Amhara (98.74%), and the Agaw/Kamyr (1.11%); all other ethnic groups made up 0.15% of the population. Amharic was spoken as a first language by 99.16%. The majority of the inhabitants practiced Ethiopian Orthodox Christianity, with 99.8% reporting that as their religion. This had remained largely the same by 2007, with 99.72% reporting that as their religion.
