= Kemekem =

Coordinates: 12°20′N 37°40′E

Libo Kemekem ሊቦ ከምከም
- Woreda
- Flag
- Interactive map of Libo Kemekem
- Zone: Debub Gondar
- Region: Amhara Region

Area
  - Total: 999.71 km^{2} (385.99 sq mi)

Population (2012 est.)
  - Total: 217,029
  - Density: 217.09/km^{2} (562.27/sq mi)

Kemekem (also known as Libo Kemekem (Amharic: ሊቦ ከምከም) is one of the woredas in the Amhara Region of Ethiopia. Part of the Debub Gondar Zone, Kemekem is bordered on the south by the Reb which separates it from Fogera, on the west by Lake Tana, on the north by the Semien Gondar Zone, and on the east by Ebenat. The administrative center is Addis Zemen; other towns include Amba Meda and Yifag.

Rivers in this woreda include the Arno and the Reb, which drain into Lake Tana. A survey of the land in this woreda shows that 51% is arable or cultivable, 8.3% pasture, 5.9% forest or shrubland, 17.98% covered with water, and the remaining 17.03% is considered degraded or other. Teff, corn, sorghum, cotton and sesame are important cash crops.

== History ==
The village of Bura, outside of Addis Zemen, was struck by an outbreak of Kala Azar in May 2005, which infected 230 people there.

The woreda of Kemekem was heavily affected by the flash floods in Ethiopia that started 6 September and receded by 26 September 2006. The heavy rain caused Lake Tana to overflow its banks, making thousands of people homeless. "Thousands of heads of cattle, whole silos of grain, and significant tracts of grazing and farmland have been washed away," according to IRIN.

== Demographics ==
A 2012 estimate puts the population at 217,029. This gives a population density of 217.09 people per square kilometer (562.27 people per square mile), given its area of 999.71 square kilometers (385.99 square miles), higher than the South Gondar Zone average of 158.85 people per square kilometer (411.43 people per square mile).

Based on the 2007 national census conducted by the Central Statistical Agency of Ethiopia (CSA), this woreda has a total population of 198,435, a decrease of 9.97% from the 1994 census, of whom 100,987 are men and 97,448 women; 22,054 or 11.11% are urban inhabitants. With an area of 999.71 square kilometers, Kemekem has a population density of 198.49, which is greater than the Zone average of 145.56 persons per square kilometer. A total of 45,399 households were counted in this woreda, resulting in an average of 4.37 persons to a household, and 43,836 housing units. The 1994 national census reported a total population for this woreda of 212,341 in 44,156 households, of whom 110,015 were men and 102,326 were women; 12,515 or 5.89% of its population were urban dwellers.

In 1994 the largest ethnic group reported in Kemekem was the Amhara (99.82%). Amharic was spoken as a first language by 99.86%. The majority of the population practiced Ethiopian Orthodox Christianity with 95.57% practicing that belief, while 4.35% of the population said they were Muslim. This had shifted a little by 2007, with 96.19% reporting Ethiopian Orthodox Christianity as their religion, while 3.69% of the population said they were Muslim.
