= Korata =

Korata ቆራጣ
- Kebele
- Woreda: Dera
- Zone: Debub Gondar
- Region: Amhara Region

Area
  - Total: 26.09 km^{2} (10.07 sq mi)

Population
  - Total: 9,245
  - Density: 354.4/km^{2} (917.8/sq mi)

Korata is one of the kebeles in the Amhara Region of Ethiopia. It is the location of the former town of Korata. Korata is located 42 KM from Bahir Dar.

During the 19th century, Korata was considered one of the holiest places in Ethiopia and was a major settlement. Korata became a religious site after a nun, Waldt-Máryam, saved the settlement from an attack by Oromo invaders. Consequently, Waldt-Máryam became venerated as a saint and Korata became a religious centre. Only the head of the Ethiopian church and the emperor were allowed to ride mules or horses on the town's streets.

Korata was known for its beauty and well-built houses of stone. The town contained so many large trees that, from a distance, it could be difficult to tell it was a major settlement.
