= Tach Gayint =

District in Amhara Region, Ethiopia

Coordinates: 11°45′N 38°20′E

Tach Gayint ታች ጋይንት
- Woreda
- Flag
- Interactive map of Tach Gayint
- Zone: Debub Gondar
- Region: Amhara Region

Area
  - Total: 825.30 km^{2} (318.65 sq mi)

Population (2012 est.)
  - Total: 111,004
  - Density: 134.50/km^{2} (348.36/sq mi)

Tach Gayint (Amharic: ታች ጋይንት "Lower Gayint") is a woreda in the Amhara Region of Ethiopia. Part of the Debub Gondar Zone (South Gondar Zone), Tach Gayint is bordered on the south by the

Bashilo River which separates it from the Debub Wollo Zone, on the west by Simada, on the north by Lay Gayint, and on the east by the Checheho River which separates it from the Semien Wollo Zone. The major town in Tach Gayint is Arb Gebeya.

== Overview ==
The elevations of this woreda range from 750 to 2800 meters above sea level; about 23% is classified lowland, 63% mid-level, and 23.7% uplands. Rivers and streams include the Futan. The topography of Tach Gayint is distinguished by gullies and rugged terrain covering 54% of its surface, while mountains cover 23% and plains 22%. Above all a significant portion of the arable land is degraded. Deforestation is a serious problem in Tach Gayint, and it has been increasing rapidly. Once all of the trees had been cut for firewood, locals then turned to extracting the roots, which has critically damaged the soil in this woreda. As Sileshi Tessera writes in his study, "Tach Gayint has been virtually stripped of vegetation." A sample survey reveals that the total area of berha (farmland apart from the homestead) is 31,386.37 hectares (31.5%), common grazing land is 8,107.11 hectares (8.1%) and of wojed (gardens around the homestead) is 46,174.03 hectares (46.4%). The major agricultural crops in Tach Gayint include: cereals such as teff (42,873 quintals harvested in 2005), barley (31,134 quintals) and wheat (20,027 quintals); pulses such as fava beans (5,174 quintals), field peas (3,576 quintals), haricot beans (3,037 quintals), and chick peas (1,334 quintals); vegetables such as potatoes (18,874 quintals); bananas (1,637 quintals) and hops (2,163 quintals).

Due to the extreme poverty endemic in this woreda, Sileshi Tessera noted the importance of local social institutions, which redistributes food to needy members. The most important – and popular – is the iddir, which was adopted in Tach Gayint only six or seven years before Sileshi's study. Other social institutions present include the mahiber, iqqub, and the sebeka-gubae; the last two also provides cash funds to needy members. On the other hand, modern assistance institutions, for example microfinance programs, have proven less successful.

== Demographics ==
A 2012 estimate puts the population at 111,004. This gives a population density of 134.50 people per square kilometer (348.36 people per square mile), given its area of 825.30 square kilometers (318.65 square miles), lower than the South Gondar Zone average of 158.85 people per square kilometer (411.43 people per square mile).

Based on the 2007 national census conducted by the Central Statistical Agency of Ethiopia (CSA), this woreda has a total population of 101,956, an increase of 21.15% over the 1994 census, of whom 51,041 are men and 50,915 women; 8,000 or 7.85% are urban inhabitants. With an area of 825.30 square kilometers, Tach Gayint has a population density of 123.54, which is less than the Zone average of 145.56 persons per square kilometer. A total of 23,664 households were counted in this woreda, resulting in an average of 4.31 persons to a household, and 22,843 housing units. The 1994 national census reported a total population for this woreda of 84,158 in 18,813 households, of whom 42,593 were men and 41,565 were women; 2,675 or 3.18% of its population were urban dwellers.

In 1994 he largest ethnic group reported in Tach Gayint was the Amhara (99.87%). Amharic was spoken as a first language by 99.94%. The majority of the population practiced Ethiopian Orthodox Christianity with 92.2% professing that belief, while 7.74% of the population said they were Muslim. This was mostly the same in 2007, with 92.73% reporting Ethiopian Orthodox Christianity as their religion, while 7.15% of the population said they were Muslim.
