= Ambra Mariam =

Ethiopian village

Ambra Mariam (Amharic for "Fort Mary") was an Ethiopian village in the early 20th century. It was located at the northeast corner of Lake Tana, between Gondar and Debra Tabor.
