= Simada =

District in Amhara Region, Ethiopia

Coordinates: 11°30′N 38°15′E

Simada ስማዳ
- Woreda
- Flag
- Interactive map of Simada
- Zone: Debub Gondar
- Region: Amhara Region

Area
  - Total: 2,244.96 km^{2} (866.78 sq mi)

Population (2012 est.)
  - Total: 247,372
  - Density: 110.190/km^{2} (285.391/sq mi)

Simada (Amharic: ስማዳ) is a woreda in the Amhara Region of Ethiopia. Part of the Debub Gondar Zone (or South Gondar Zone), Simada is bordered on the southeast by the Bashilo River which separates it from the Debub Wollo Zone, on the southwest by the Abay River which separates it from the Misraq Gojjam Zone, on the west by Misraq Este, on the north by Lay Gayint, and on the northeast by Tach Gayint. Part of this woreda's boundary with Este is defined by the Musafa River at the northern border and Yiba River at the southern border. Both rivers combined together before becoming a tributary of the Abay (The White Nile). The major town in Simada is Wegeda.

== Overview ==
This woreda has been topographically described as 10% highland, 30% mid-highland and 60% lowland. A rough dry-weather road 53 kilometers long connects Wegeda to the main Debre Tabor - Nefas Mewcha all-weather highway (also known as the Chinese Road).

Local officials announced 3 March 2009 that a number of health stations were under construction at six locations. These would join two existing health stations and 31 health posts, and provide service to over 100,000 inhabitants when they are fully operational. The cost for these facilities was over eight million Birr provided by the Ethiopian Federal government, the woreda and GTZ, a German non-governmental organization.

== Demographics ==
A 2012 estimate puts the population at 247,372. This gives a population density of 110.19 people per square kilometer (285.39 people per square mile), given its area of 2,244.96 square kilometers (866.78 square miles), much lower than the South Gondar Zone average of 158.85 people per square kilometer (411.43 people per square mile).

Based on the 2007 national census conducted by the Central Statistical Agency of Ethiopia (CSA), this woreda has a total population of 228,271, an increase of 21.55% over the 1994 census, of whom 113,322 are men and 114,949 women; 10,304 or 4.51% are urban inhabitants. With an area of 2,244.96 square kilometers, Simada has a population density of 101.68, which is less than the Zone average of 145.56 persons per square kilometer. A total of 53,969 households were counted in this woreda, resulting in an average of 4.23 persons to a household, and 52,238 housing units. The 1994 national census reported a total population for this woreda of 187,799 in 42,995 households, of whom 94,510 were men and 93,289 were women; 4,602 or 2.45% of its population were urban dwellers.

In 1994 the largest ethnic group reported in Simada was the Amhara (99.96%). Amharic was spoken as a first language by 99.97%. The majority of the population practiced Ethiopian Orthodox Christianity with 84.81% professing this belief, while 15.09% of the population said they were Muslim, giving Simada the largest concentration of Muslims in this Zone, either in percentage or total numbers. This had shifted somewhat by 2007, with 86.92% reporting Ethiopian Orthodox Christianity as their religion, while 13.03% of the population said they were Muslim.
