= Sehala =

Sehala ሰሀላ
- Woreda
- Flag
- Zone: Wag Hemra
- Region: Amhara Region

Area
  - Total: 1,143.35 km^{2} (441.45 sq mi)

Population (2012 est.)
  - Total: 25,507
  - Density: 22.31/km^{2} (57.78/sq mi)

Sehala (Amharic: ሰሀላ ) is one of the woredas in the Amhara Region of Ethiopia. Part of the Wag Hemra zone, Sehala is bordered on the west by the Semien (North) Gondar Zone, on the northwest by Abergele, and on the east and southeast by the Tekezé River which separates it from Zikuala. Sehala was separated from Zikuala woreda.

== Demographics ==
A 2012 estimate puts the population at 25,507. This gives a population density of 22.31 people per square kilometer (57.78 people per square mile), given its area of 1,143.35 square kilometers (441.45 square miles), less than half the Wag Hemra Zone average of 51.28 people per square kilometer (132.81 people per square mile).

Based on the 2007 national census conducted by the Central Statistical Agency of Ethiopia (CSA), this woreda has a total population of 23,688, of whom 12,128 are men and 11,560 women; none are urban inhabitants. The majority of the inhabitants practiced Ethiopian Orthodox Christianity, with 99.94% reporting that as their religion.

== Geography ==
The topography of the woreda is surrounded by many mountains and there is only one river which starts from Beyeda woreda, "Meshiha".
