= Zikuala =

District in Amhara Region, Ethiopia

Coordinates: 13°10′N 38°30′E

Zikuala ዝቋላ
- Woreda
- Flag
- Interactive map of Zikuala
- Zone: Wag Hemra
- Region: Amhara

Area
  - Total: 1,726.12 km^{2} (666.46 sq mi)

Population (2012 est.)
  - Total: 47,910
  - Density: 27.76/km^{2} (71.89/sq mi)

Zikuala (Amharic: ዝቋላ) is one of the woredas in the Amhara Region of Ethiopia. Located in the Wag Hemra Zone, Zikuala is bordered on the south by Dehana, on the west it is bordered by the Tekezé River which separates it from the Semien Gondar Zone and Sehala, on the north by Abergele, and on the east by Soqota. The major town in Zikuala is Siyalewa. Sehala woreda was separated from Zikuala.

== Demographics ==
A 2012 estimate puts the population at 47,910. This gives a population density of 27.76 people per square kilometer (71.89 people per square mile), given its area of 1,726.12 square kilometers (666.46 square miles), much lower than the Wag Hemra Zone average of 51.28 people per square kilometer (132.81 people per square mile).

Based on the 2007 national census conducted by the Central Statistical Agency of Ethiopia (CSA), this woreda has a total population of 44,013, of whom 22,497 are men and 21,516 women; 3,398 or 7.72% are urban inhabitants. With an area of 1,726.12 square kilometers, Zikuala has a population density of 25.50, which is less than the Zone average of 47.15 persons per square kilometer. A total of 10,428 households were counted in this woreda, resulting in an average of 4.22 persons to a household, and 10,105 housing units. The 1994 national census reported a total population for this woreda of 48,860 in 11,516 households, of whom 25,435 were men and 23,425 were women; 681 or 1.39% of its population were urban dwellers.

IN 1994 the two largest ethnic groups reported in Zikuala were the Agaw/Kamyr (88.96%), and the Amhara (10.94%); all other ethnic groups made up 0.1% of the population. Kamyr was spoken as a first language by 79.76%, and 20.15% spoke Amharic; the remaining 0.09% spoke all other primary languages reported. The majority of the inhabitants practiced Ethiopian Orthodox Christianity, with 99.91% reporting that as their religion. This had changed little by 2007, with 99.74% reporting that as their religion.
