= Amde Werq =

Town in northern Ethiopia

Amdewerq (Amdework), (amdewerk) (Amharic "a pillar of gold") is a town in northern Ethiopia. Located in the Wag Hemra Zone of the Amhara Region, the town has a latitude and longitude of 12°20′N 38°45′E with an elevation of 2421 meters above sea level. Amde Werq is the administrative centre of Dehana woreda. The word Dehana means "poor" in Ethiopian (Amharic) language.

== Geography ==
The town is situated on a plateau and has Dega (temperate) climate. The western section of the town is sheltered by the Debba mountain ranges. Immediately west of the township is Cherqos Church the oldest place of worship in the area. Southwest to the church is a large plain known as Goodgooda. Goodgooda is a flat terrain which is approximately three thousand hectares in size. Adjoining the northern section of the Goodgooda Plain is an ever green grazing field called Quilla. This meadow/plain is approximately two thousand hectares.

Biwool, situated about three kilometres east of Amdewerq, is the highest mountain in the area. Much of Amde Werq is sandstone country. There are spots, particularly in the low laying farming lands, that derive their substrates from granite and rich basalt rocks.

There are numerous rivers, creeks and fountains in Dehana. This is particularly true in places immediately west of Amde-Werq. The people of Amde Werq get their drinking water from a fountain located immediately south west of the township. The name of this vital fountain is Geredalga, which literally means "a throne of the domestic maids". As the only source of water close to the township, the girls or women used to sit there for several hours waiting for their turn to draw water; and thus the name implies going to Gered-Alga is like going to a vacation from the usual back breaking work. The main rivers around Amde Werq are: the Sebeha, Arri, Ebbi, Zentekerna and Merri. The biggest of all the rivers in the area is, the Tekezé.

== Forestry and wildlife ==
One of the most dominant tree species around the town of Amde Werq used to be Woyrra or African Olive. As a result of land clearing for agriculture, firewood and housing purposes, the countryside around Amde-Werq became devoid of its original/natural vegetation. Today, those original tree species and shrubs are only found in church yards. (As people are not allowed to cut trees growing in church yards). Trees found in church yards, are said to reflect the diversity of tree species that once occurred in and around Amde Werq. Behar Zaff, a Eucalyptus species introduced from Australia, a little over a hundred years ago by Emperior Minilik II, dominates the landscape. Although this fast growing tree, Eucalyptus globulus is helping the people in terms of providing fuel for cooking and other domestic consumptions, the genera to which this tree species belongs is known to possess an inhibitive effect on the growth and development of native plant species.

Native vegetation clearing or habitat modification in and around Amde Werq has caused a decline in population size and the local extinction of many of the native animals. Native animals includes squirrels and the baboons (Cilladdas) that used to be found in the rock outcrops and cliffs of Amdeworq. A few decades ago, Cilladdas used to be seen roaming and foraging around the edge of the town including around General Hailu Kebede Primary School.

== Agriculture and difficulties ==
Agriculture is the main livelihood of the people of Dehana. While the Quilla meadow is strictly used for grazing purposes, the Goodgooda plain on the other hand is often used to grow wheat, barley or broad Beans.

As a result of bad farming practices and erosion, much of the farming land which has been tilled for hundreds of years, has lost a significant portion of its fertile or top soil. As commercial fertilizer is not widespread or not often used in Dehana, the subsistent farmers use crop rotation to get better yields. Much of Dehan is made up of undulating to a rugged terrain, thus, farmers/peasants do not use irrigation to grow crops. The subsistent farmers are dependent on the June - August rains to grow their crops. There are no cash crops (coffee, fruits, chiat) in Dehan. When rains fail to come on time or come at highly reduced level, many people become exposed to famine and hunger.

A few of the rural/farming centres adjacent to Amde Werq include: Shaqochiqa, Kergemnu, Eworge, Bahsage, Tatras, Telush, Wagshum Demmo, Ziya, Silda, Debba, Argoba, Laamma, Attilba, and Kollan.

== Culture ==
=== Religion ===
A large population of Dehana natives are predominantly followers of the Ethiopian Orthodox Church. Approximately 98% of the people belong to this faith. The other 1.5% are black Jews and live out in the country sides or regional villages while 0.5% are followers Islam who mostly reside in Amde Werq Town and a couple of villages within Dehana. Until the mid-1960s there were also small daring and brave groups of people living in three villages in the western section of Dehana who were members of the Seventh Day Adventist church. As a minority group surrounded by a sea of Orthodox Christians, the Adventists in Dehana found it extremely difficult to practise their faith without impediment from neighbouring zealous Orthodox Christians who did not want to see another form of Christianity. In 1960, these neighbouring Orthodox Christians burnt down the houses and properties of the Adventist believers, destroyed their crops, and plundered their property. When the prominent leader of the Adventist faith in Dehana (Aleqa Metiku Woldgeorgis) who put up appropriate resistance to extremist elements, died 1963 (1956EC) as a result of a stroke, the majority of the Adventist faith followers who used to live in the three villages (Argoba, Llamma and Kolan) left their villages and migrated to the southern part of Ethiopia where Protestantism is well entrenched. A few of the Adventists (e.g. Isseye Seyoum) who chose to live in their villages rather than migrate south, put up with the harassment and intimidation from some of the fanatic Orthodox neighbouring villagers, grew older and died in their badema (ancestral land).

=== Sport ===
Every year at the end of the yearly harvest, which occurs in November or early December, young men use the large open space to play a game of Genna. Genna is a game which is played during the months of December to February. The game looks like a hybrid between cricket and soccer, except Genna requires a rather large area. This game is one of the most popular games played in and around Amde Werq. The game requires a butting stick and a Ting or Enqur. Ting is a leather ball slightly smaller than a Cricket ball. Kids who cannot make a leather ball use a small piece of timber known as enqoor which is approximately three inches long by one and half inches thick. Players residing east of the Goodgooda plain hit Ting towards the western end of the field. Players who reside or come from west of the plying field hit the Ting towards the eastern end of the field. Points are scored when the ball reaches either ends of the playing field. as there could be hundreds of people participating in the game, it could take several hours before the Ting or Enqur reaches the finish line. This type of competition slightly similar to the Australian NRL State of Origin. While the winner group talks and basks in glory, the losing team eagerly awaits the next year to restore its pride. The Amharic phrase "Alemane Beshro Belane" is the song of the winning team. In Amdew Werq, the game is played towards the end of January (Tir Charqos).
