= Abergele, Amhara =

Coordinates: 13°5′24.64″N 38°57′27.07″E

Abergele, Amhara አበርገሌ
- Woreda
- Flag
- Interactive map of Abergele, Amhara
- Zone: Wag Hemra
- Region: Amhara Region

Area
  - Total: 1,766.65 km^{2} (682.11 sq mi)

Population (2012 est.)
  - Total: 46,509
  - Density: 26.326/km^{2} (68.184/sq mi)

Abergele (Amharic: አበርገሌ) is one of the woredas in the Amhara Region of Ethiopia. The capital and main town of the woreda is Nirak. Part of the Wag Hemra Zone, Abergele is bordered on the south by Zikuala, on the southwest by Sehala, on the northwest by the Semien (North) Gondar Zone, on the north and east by the Tigray Region, and on the southeast by Soqota. Abergele was separated from the Soqota administrative division.

The district should not be confounded with the neighbouring Abergele (woreda) in Tigray region.

== Demographics ==
A 2012 estimate puts the population at 46,509. This gives a population density of 26.33 people per square kilometer (68.18 people per square mile), given its area of 1,766.65 square kilometers (682.11 square miles), just over half the Wag Hemra Zone average of 51.28 people per square kilometer (132.81 people per square mile).

Based on the 2007 national census conducted by the Central Statistical Agency of Ethiopia (CSA), this woreda has a total population of 43,191, of whom 21,976 are men and 21,215 women; none are urban inhabitants. The majority of the inhabitants practiced Ethiopian Orthodox Christianity, with 99.93% reporting that as their religion.

== History ==
=== 21st century ===
Niruak is the town of abergele woreda, the word is himtegna word meaning water of traders.
