= Awra Amba =

Ethiopian intentional community living in Amhara Region

Coordinates: 11.9199°N 37.7871°E

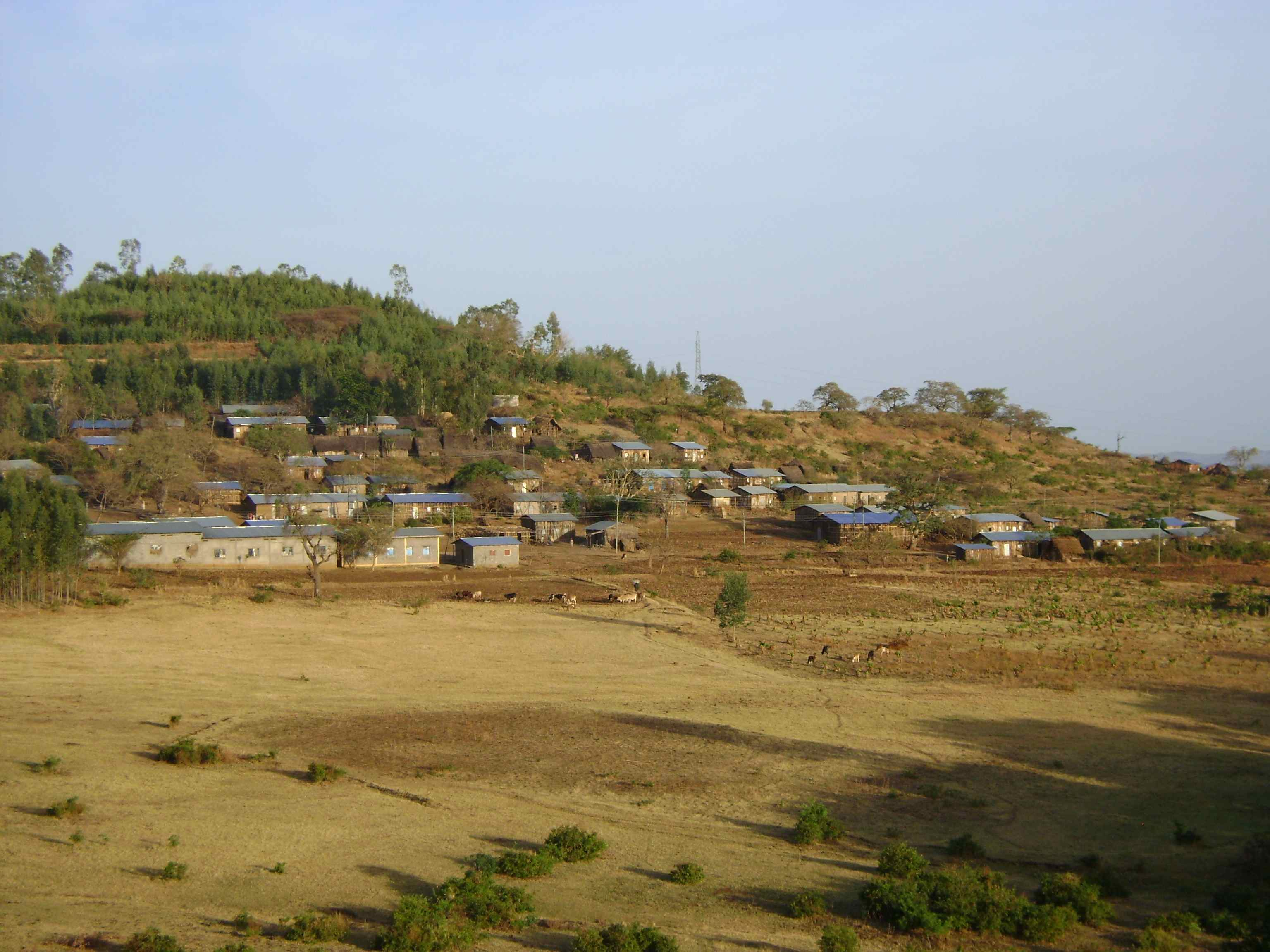
Awra Amba

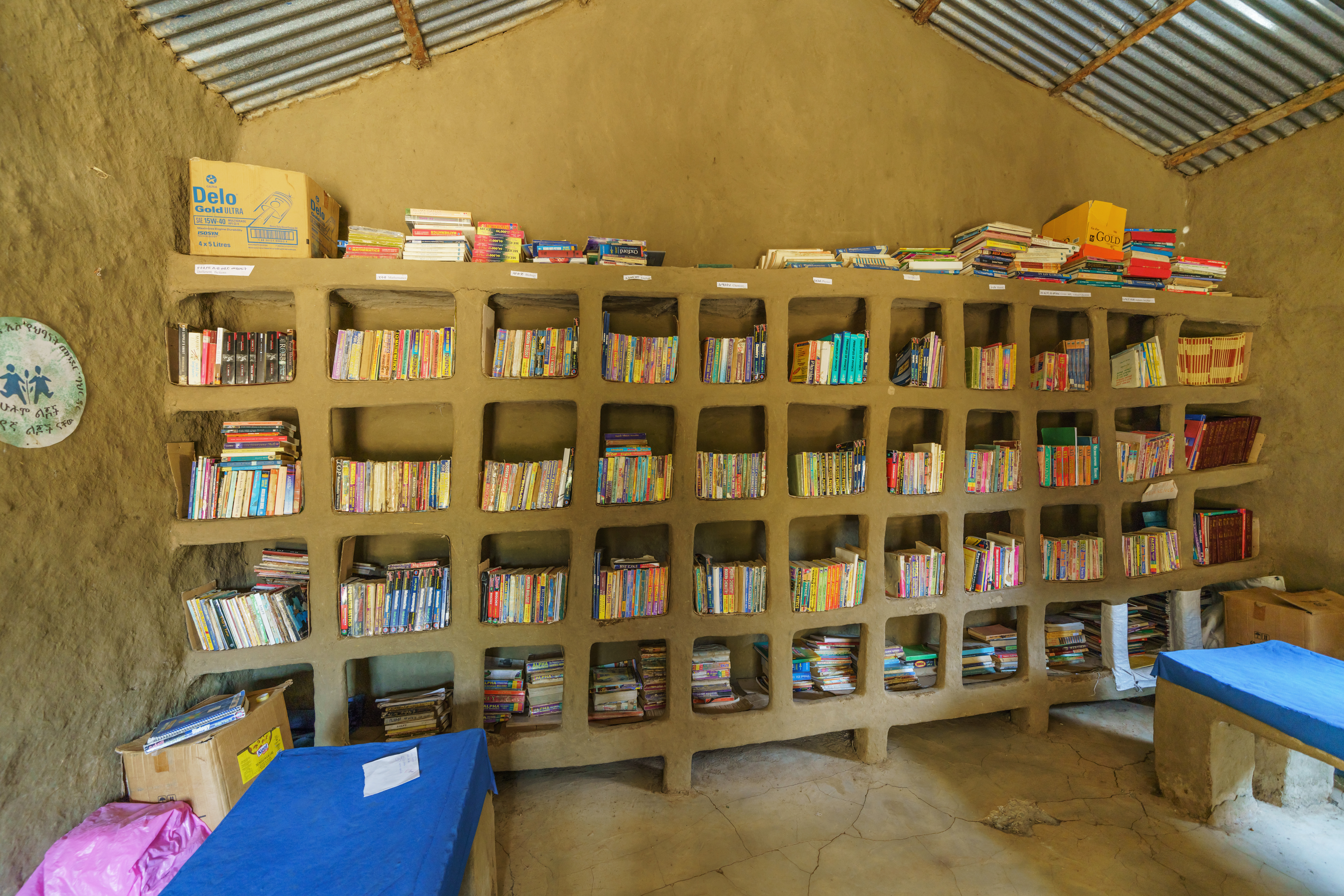
Library located in Awra Amba

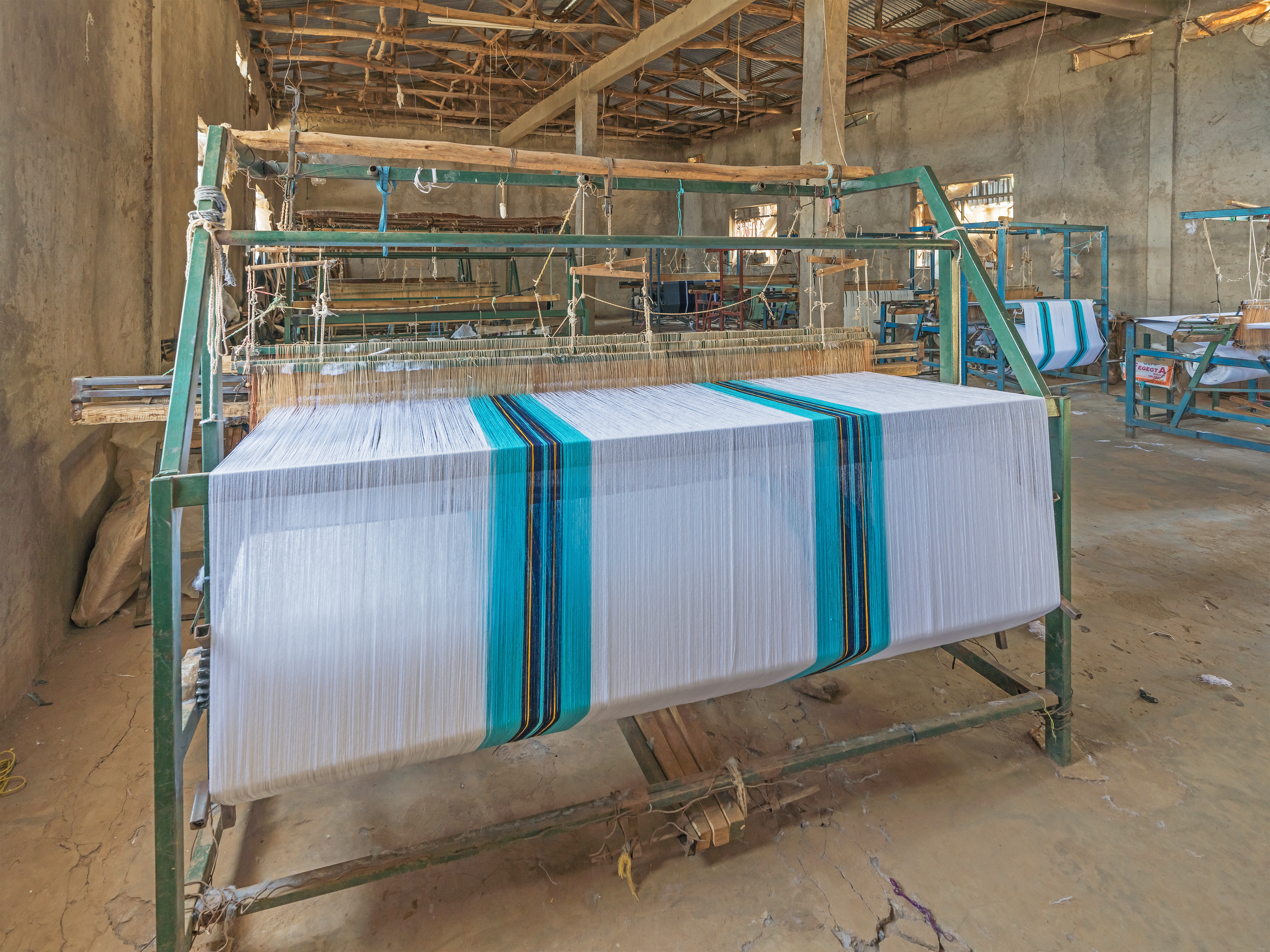
Weaving manufacture

Awra Amba (Amharic: አውራ አምባ) is an Ethiopian intentional community of about 463 people, located 73 kilometres east of Bahir Dar in the Fogera woreda of Debub Gondar Zone. It was founded in 1980 with the goal of solving socio-economic problems through helping one another in an environment of egalitarianism — in marked contrast to the traditional norms of Amhara society. The name means "Top of the Hill" in Amharic.

Founded by Zumra Nuru, who currently serves as co-chairman of the community, with 19 other people who shared his vision, as of 2016 Awra Amba has some 450 members, and is lauded as a model to alleviate poverty and promote gender equality in a country where women are generally subservient to men.

== History ==
Awra Amba was founded in 1980 by Zumra Nuru. In 1989 the community was forced out of its settlement for 4 years due to other villages viewing them as communists. After the fall of the Derg and the transition from the People's Democratic Republic of Ethiopia, the community returned to their settlement in 1993.

== Description ==
The fact that its members work together, are diligent, disciplined and self-confident makes the Awra Amba community distinct from other Amhara communities. Women have equal rights as men and there is no distinction in divisions of labor between men and women. All people in the community have no religion as distinct from most communities in Ethiopia. They believe in hard work and being good to people. They keep their houses and their surrounding clean. Theft is seen as very obscene.

The community is ostracized, as it does not belong to either of the two primary religious groupings — Christianity or Islam. Members of the Awra Amba community therefore were not given agricultural land to cultivate, but instead were pushed into the most infertile and malaria infested corner of the district. As they cannot live on farm activities, they have diversified into the weaving business, using both traditional and modern weaving machines. In addition, using three grinding mills provided by the Regional Micro and Small Scale Enterprise Development Agency, they offer milling service to neighbouring farmers. The village hopes to earn more money in order to build potable water and sewage systems, pave the road, and create an education fund for the children.

The village is unique not only for its attitudes toward gender, religion, and education, but for the social security it provides its members in need. There are formal committees to provide services which include: education, to receive guests, to take care of patients, the elderly and children, and community health. They have established a literacy campaign for adults, a library, and a preschool. Despite living in a culture which practices early marriage, the people of Awra Amba have decided girls should marry only after reaching the age of 18, and boys at or above 22.

The village's success has made it a subject of numerous studies. "So many Christian and Muslim leaders from all over [Ethiopia's regions] and some from outside have visited the village because it is very famous in its endeavor to eliminate poverty," says Mulgeta Wuletaw, a regional government administrator and member of parliament. Another supporter is Mohammed Mussa, a rural development consultant who prepared a case study on the village for the World Bank. "This is an extraordinary initiative within a traditional and conservative community," he says. "It's a good example for other Ethiopian communities — and even beyond Ethiopia — because of its gender equality, its work ethic, and its social security system."

== See also ==
- Commune
- Cooperation
