= Reb River =

River in Ethiopia

Reb River Rib
- Native name: ርብ (Amharic)

Location
- Country: Ethiopia
- Region: Amhara
- Zone: South Gondar

Physical characteristics
- Source
  - location: Near Gasay
  - coordinates: 11.78977°N 38.16341°E
  - elevation: 2,808 m (9,213 ft)
- Mouth: Lake Tana
  - coordinates: 12°02′26″N 37°36′00″E
  - elevation: 1,788 m (5,866 ft)
- Length: 110 km (68 mi)
- Basin size: 1,570 km^{2} (610 sq mi)
- Discharge
  - location: Mouth (estimate)
  - average: 27.78 m^{3}/s (981 cu ft/s)
  - minimum: 5.34 m^{3}/s (189 cu ft/s)
  - maximum: 73.17 m^{3}/s (2,584 cu ft/s)

Basin features
- Progression: Lake Tana → Blue Nile → Nile → Mediterranean Sea
- River system: Nile Basin
- Population: 500,000

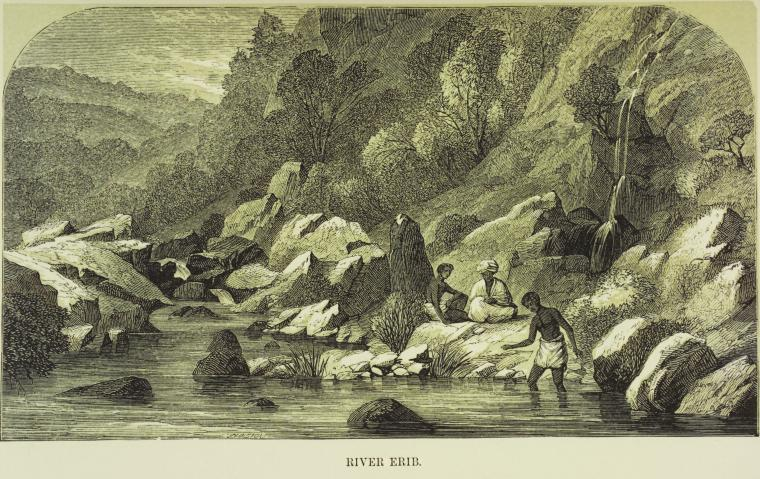
1862

The Reb (also transliterated as Rib; Amharic "bottom, buttocks") is a river of north-central Ethiopia which empties into Lake Tana in a small delta. The river originates on the slopes of Mount Guna, and flows west through Kemekem woreda. It has no significant tributaries.

== Background ==
R.E. Cheesman described the Reb in 1936 as bringing "down quantities of dark sand, and we passed banks of it deposited on the lake shore. The river bar, 600 yards out in the lake, is a semicircle, and parties of travellers with loaded donkeys were passing round it instead of crossing the river." Merchants based in Yifag would transport bars of salt or amoleh in small boats or tankwas down the Reb to Zege on the lake to trade for coffee.

The Reb was also the site of one of several stone bridges built during the time of the Jesuit missionaries or the reign of Fasilides. The river consisting of five arches, it was located 24 kilometers (15 mi) from the estuary and enabled travel between Gondar and Debre Tabor. The five arches bridge]was built by the Italian Government in 1939. It was designed by my father Ottavio Zappa. I have in my possession the original photograph of the bridge that is now posted at the Consulate General of Italy in Vancouver, British Columbia, Canada. Osvaldo Zappa p. During the Italian occupation, the Italians built a stone bridge over the river and was not a wooden one as is claimed and was not damaged during the British campaign. Osvaldo Zappa

On 21 June 2007, the World Bank announced that it had approved an International Development Association credit of US$100 million for an Irrigation and Drainage project covering the Magech and Reb rivers, as part of the Nile Basin Initiative. With the goal of increasing irrigated agricultural output, this proposed project will develop incrementally a total area of 20,000 hectares.

== See also ==
- List of Ethiopian rivers
