= Debre Tabor University =

Public research university in Debre Tabor, Amhara Region, Ethiopia

- ደብረ ታቦር ዩኒቨርሲቲ
- Motto in English: "We have a historical duty to answer Tewodros's quest for knowledge"
- Type: Public
- Established: 2008
- Accreditation: Ministry of Education
- President: Anegagregn Gashaw Ferede
- Vice-president: Menberu Teshome
- Total staff: 3,000
- Students: over 18,000
- Undergraduates: +15,000
- Location: Debre Tabor, South Gondar Zone, Amhara Region, Ethiopia; 12.264°N 38.056°E
- Language: English; Amharic
- Website: dtu.edu.et
- Location within Ethiopia

Debre Tabor University (Amharic: ደብረ ታቦር ዩኒቨርሲቲ; DTU) is a non-profit, public, coeducational higher education institution in Debre Tabor town, South Gondar Zone, Amhara Region, Ethiopia. Established in 2008, it was a non-profit landed to 126 hectares of land that was previously owned by 268 farmers who compensated over 10.5 million birr.

Accredited by the Ministry of Education (MoE), the university offers various degree programs in agriculture, medicine and health sciences, business and economics, social science and humanities, natural and computational sciences, law, information communication technology, and biotechnology, for both graduate and undergraduate students.

== History ==
Debre Tabor University was established in 2008 as non-profit university. It was accredited by the Ministry of Education. The university offers wide range of degree programs within the fields of technology, agriculture, medicine and health sciences, business and economics, social science and humanities, natural and computational sciences, law, information communication technology, and biotechnology. There are graduate and undergraduate courses available for these fields.

It was established in 126 hectares of land previously owned by 268 farmers who were compensated over 10.5 million birr. The university abodes over 18,000 residential students and 3,000 teachers and staff across its faculties of business, natural sciences, agriculture, health sciences, social sciences, and technology. In latter years, the university allowed on research by Chinese and Russian institutions. On 10 May 2022, Debre Tabor University held the first meeting with South China Agricultural University (SCAU) to establish partnership via a webinar facilitated by the Embassy in Beijing. Teshome Toga, ambassador of Ethiopia to China, remarked his appreciation of their relations.

== See also ==
- List of universities and colleges in Ethiopia
- Education in Ethiopia
