= Dera, Amhara (woreda) =

District in Amhara Region, Ethiopia

Coordinates: 11°45′N 37°30′E

Dera ደራ
- Woreda
- Flag
- Interactive map of Dera
- Zone: Debub Gondar
- Region: Amhara

Area
  - Total: 1,525.24 km^{2} (588.90 sq mi)

Population (2012 est.)
  - Total: 270,100
  - Density: 177.09/km^{2} (458.65/sq mi)

Dera (Amharic: ደራ) is one of the woredas in the Amhara Region of Ethiopia. Part of the Debub Gondar Zone, Dera is bordered on the south and west by the Bahir Dar, Atse Tewodros subcity, on the west by Lake Tana, on the north by Fogera, on the northeast by Misraq Este, and on the east by Mirab Este. The main settlement towns in Dera includes Anbesame, Arbgebeya and Hamusit and Chis Abay.

== History ==
Traditions from Tana Qirqos seem to indicate that Christianity reached Dera early, possibly during Zagwe rule. By the mid 14th century the people of Dera were already Christians, and served as stopover for monks (such as Abba Zayohannes) on journeys to northern Gojjam to spread the faith.

=== 16th century ===
In political terms, Dera only began to grow more in importance from the 16th century, when the Christian kingdom centre of gravity moved from Shewa to the Lake Tana region. One of the most decisive battle in Ethiopian history took place in the area near Wayna Dagna on 21 February 1543, when the Muslim forces of the Adal Sultanate and the Ottoman Empire were routed by the Amharas and their Portuguese allies. The Christians of Dera decimated the fleeing contingents of Ahmad ibn Ibrahim al-Ghazi defeated army. This victory preserved the very existence of the Christian realm.

=== 17th century ===
In the 17th century, in Woreta, Dera's main town today. Emperor Fasilides built a church in honour of the female martyr and saint Walatta Petros.

== Overview ==
A survey of the land in this woreda shows that 46% is arable or cultivable, 6% pasture, 1% forest or shrubland, 25% covered with water and the remaining 25.9% is considered degraded or other. Teff, corn, sorghum, cotton and sesame are important cash crops.

The woreda of Dera was heavily affected by the flash floods in Ethiopia that started 6 September and receded by 26 September 2006. The heavy rain caused Lake Tana to overflow its banks, making thousands of people homeless. "Thousands of heads of cattle, whole silos of grain, and significant tracts of grazing and farmland have been washed away," according to IRIN.

== Demographics ==
A 2012 estimate puts the population at 270,100. This gives a population density of 117.09 people per square kilometer (458.65 people per square mile), given its area of 1,525.24 square kilometers (588.90 square miles), lower than the South Gondar Zone average of 158.85 people per square kilometer (411.43 people per square mile).

Based on the 2007 national census conducted by the Central Statistical Agency of Ethiopia (CSA), this woreda has a total population of 248,464, an increase of 17.01% over the 1994 census, of whom 126,961 are men and 121,503 women; 16,772 or 6.75% are urban inhabitants. With an area of 1,525.24 square kilometers, Dera has a population density of 162.90, which is greater than the Zone average of 145.56 persons per square kilometer. A total of 57,237 households were counted in this woreda, resulting in an average of 4.34 persons to a household, and 55,424 housing units. The majority of the inhabitants practiced Ethiopian Orthodox Christianity, with 98.05% reporting that as their religion, while 1.92% of the population said they were Muslim.

The 1994 national census reported a total population for this woreda of 212,341 in 44,156 households, of whom 110,015 were men and 102,326 were women; 12,515 or 5.89% of its population were urban dwellers. The largest ethnic group reported in Dera was the Amhara (99.84%). Amharic was spoken as a first language by 99.94%. The majority of the population practiced Ethiopian Orthodox Christianity with 97.42% professing that belief, and 2.48% of the population said they were Muslim.
