= Mount Guna =

Mountain and shield volcano in Amhara Region, Ethiopia

Guna
- ጉና
- Location within Ethiopia

Highest point
- Elevation: 4,120 m (13,520 ft)
- Prominence: 1,510 m (4,950 ft)
- Listing: Ultra; Ribu
- Coordinates: 11°42′39″N 38°14′12″E

Geography
- Location: Debub Gondar Zone, Amhara Region, Ethiopia

Mount Guna (Amharic: ጉና ተራራ, Guna Terara) is a mountain and shield volcano located near the cities of Nefas Mewcha and Debre Tabor, in the northern Amhara Region of Ethiopia. It is the highest point in the South Gondar Zone, with an elevation of 4,120 metres (13,517 ft) above sea level.

Mount Guna forms part of the divide between the drainage basins of the Abay and the Tekezé rivers. It is the origin of the Gumara, Rib, and other rivers, which flow into Lake Tana and Yikalo, Mebela, Goleye and other rivers, which flow into the Tekezé river.

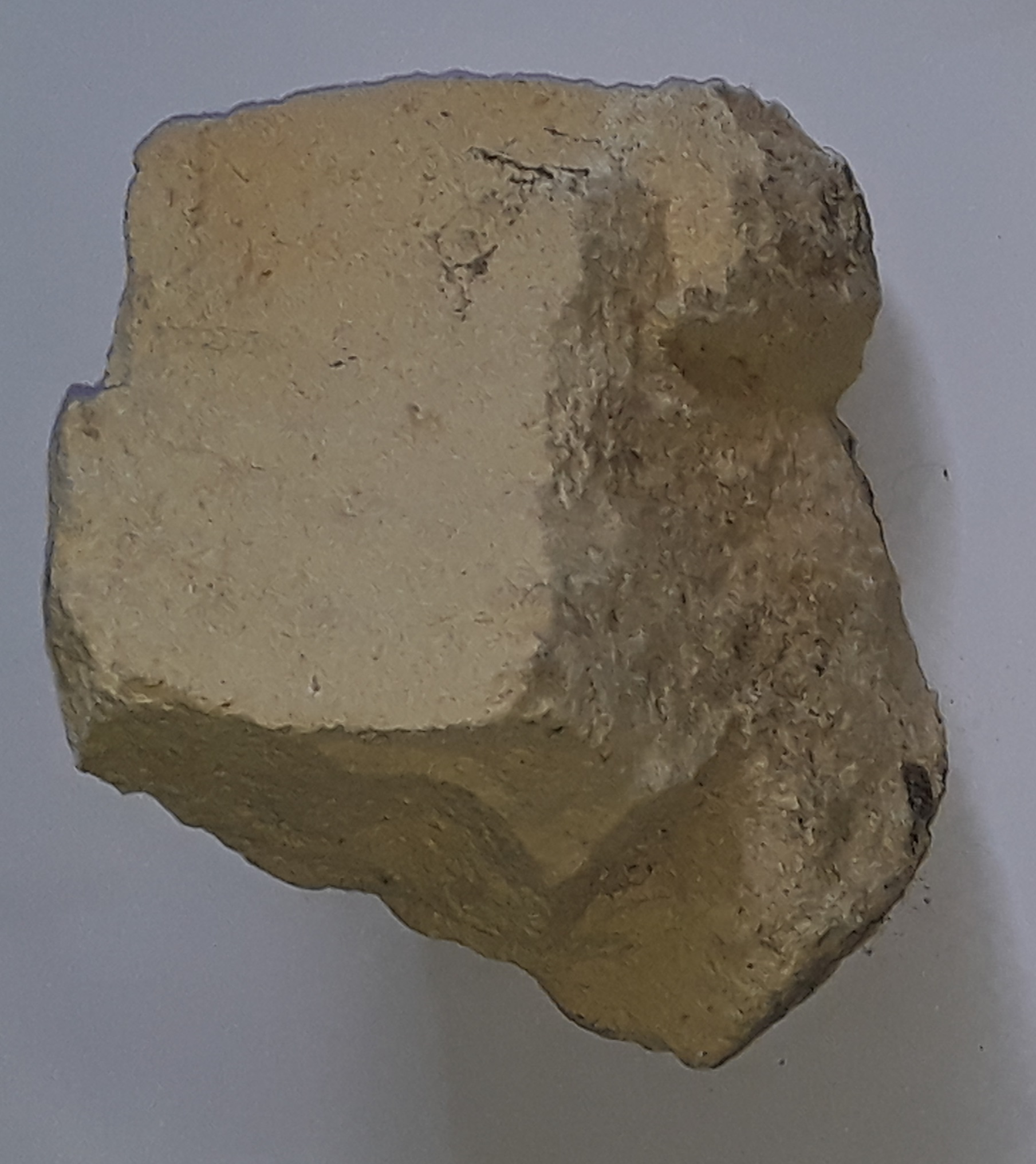
Rock sample of Ignimbrite, collected at the foot of Guna Mt.

== See also ==
- List of Ultras of Africa
