= Amed =

Amed or AMED may refer to:

- Amed (Bali), a town in Bali, Indonesia
- Amedisys Home Health and Hospice Care, a home health and hospice care company in the US, NASDAQ abbreviation AMED
- Japan Agency for Medical Research and Development
- Amed Ber, a town in northern Ethiopia
- Amed Davy Sylla, Russian footballer

== See also ==
- Diyarbakır, a city in Turkey, known to Kurds as Amed
