= Soqota (woreda) =

Coordinates: 13°00′N 38°50′E

Sekota Zuria ሰቆጣ ዙሪያ
- Woreda
- Flag
- Interactive map of Sekota Zuria
- Zone: Wag Hemra
- Region: Amhara Region

Area
  - Total: 1,722.43 km^{2} (665.03 sq mi)

Population (2007 est.)
  - Total: 134,702
  - Density: 78.20/km^{2} (202.55/sq mi)

Sekota Zuria, also spelled Sokota, Sakota, Soqota (Amharic ሰቆጣ ዙሪያ "Greater Sekota Area") is one of the woredas in the Amhara Region of Ethiopia. Located in the Wag Hemra Zone, Sekota is bordered on the south by Gazbibla, on the southwest by Dehana, on the west by Zikuala, on the north by Abergele, and on the east by the Tigray Region. The separate woreda of town of Soqota is surrounded by Sekota. Abergele woreda was separated from Sekota.

The predominantly hilly terrain of the woreda serves to isolate the inhabitants of Sekota, and their steep slopes are highly degraded limiting crops yields. Crops and animal husbandry are practiced together by local farmers. High points include Mount Biala (3,810 meters).

== Demographics ==
A 2012 estimate puts the population at 134,702. This gives a population density of 78.20 people per square kilometer (202.55 people per square mile), given its area of 1,722.43 square kilometers (665.03 square miles), lower than the Wag Hemra Zone average of 51.28 people per square kilometer (132.81 people per square mile).

Based on the 2007 national census conducted by the Central Statistical Agency of Ethiopia (CSA), this woreda has a total population of 112,396 of whom 56,245 are men and 56,151 women, no urban inhabitants were reported. With an area of 1,722.43 square kilometers, Sekota has a population density of 65.25, which is greater than the Zone average of 47.15 persons per square kilometer. A total of 26,903 households were counted in this woreda, resulting in an average of 4.18 persons to a household, and 25,941 housing units. The 1994 national census reported a total population for this woreda of 130,229 in 31,606 households, of whom 65,253 were men and 64,976 were women; 8,878 or 6.82% of its population were urban dwellers.

In 1994 the three largest ethnic groups reported in Sekota were the Agaw/Kamyr (74.24%), the Amhara (22.57%), and the Tigrayan (3.06%); all other ethnic groups made up 0.19% of the population. Kamyr was spoken as a first language by 68.67%, 26.72% Amharic, and Tigrinya was spoken by 4.56%; the remaining 0.05% spoke all other primary languages reported. The majority of the inhabitants practiced Ethiopian Orthodox Christianity, with 99.34% reporting that as their religion. This had changed little by 2007, with 99.82% reporting that as their religion.
