= Misraq Este =

District in Amhara Region, Ethiopia

Misraq Este ምሥራቅ እስቴ
- Woreda
- Flag
- Interactive map of Misraq Este
- Zone: Debub Gondar
- Region: Amhara

Area
  - Total: 1,365.19 km^{2} (527.10 sq mi)

Population (2012 est.)
  - Total: 229,133
  - Density: 167.840/km^{2} (434.703/sq mi)

Misraq Este (Amharic: ምሥራቅ እስቴ) is one of the woredas in the Amhara Region of Ethiopia. Part of the Debub Gondar Zone, Misraq Este is bordered on the south by the Abay River which separates

it from the Misraq Gojjam Zone, on the west by Mirab Este and Dera, on the northwest by Fogera, on the north by Farta, on the northeast by Lay Gayint, and on the east by Simada; part of this woredas boundary with Simada is defined by the Musafa River at the north border and Yiba River on the south border which join together and become a tributary of the Abay River. Towns in Misraq Este include Mekane Yesus.

== Demographics ==
A 2012 estimate puts the population at 229,133. This gives a population density of 167.84 people per square kilometer (434.70 people per square mile), given its area of 1,365.19 square kilometers (527.10 square miles), higher than the South Gondar Zone average of 158.85 people per square kilometer (411.43 people per square mile).

Based on the 2007 national census conducted by the Central Statistical Agency of Ethiopia (CSA), this woreda has a total population of 210,825, of whom 107,555 are men and 103,270 women; 13,901 or 6.59% are urban inhabitants. The majority of the inhabitants practiced Ethiopian Orthodox Christianity, with 97.08% reporting that as their religion, while 2.91% of the population said they were Muslim.
