= Wereta =

Town in Amhara Region, Ethiopia

Woreta
- Town
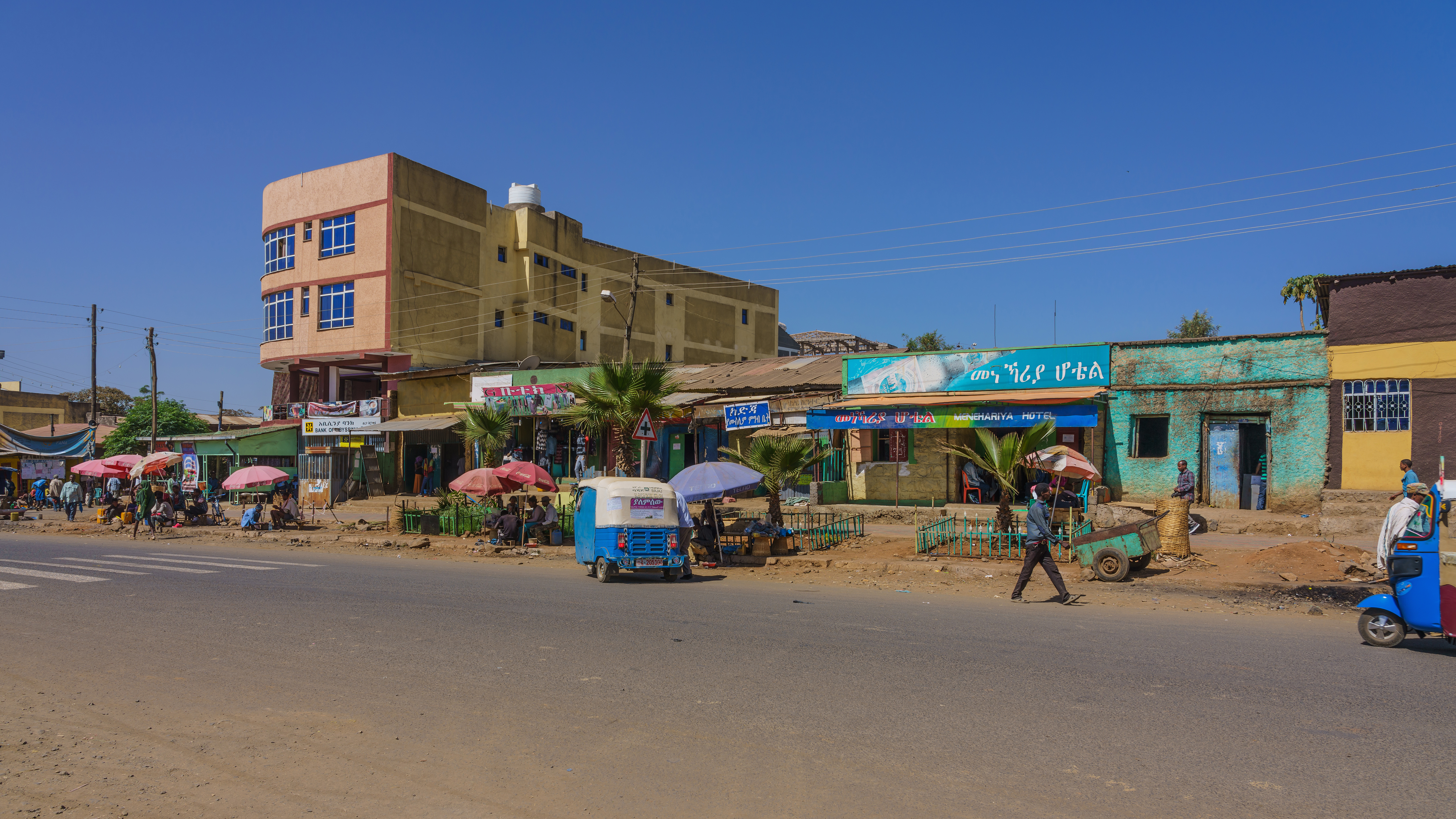

- Location within Ethiopia
- Coordinates: 11°55′N 37°42′E
- Country: Ethiopia
- Region: Amhara
- Zone: Debub Gondar
- Elevation: 1,828 m (5,997 ft)

Population (2005)
  - Total: 26,317
- Time zone: UTC+3 (EAT)

Woreta (also transliterated as Wereta) is a town in northern Ethiopia. Located in the Debub Gondar Zone of the Amhara Region, east of Lake Tana and south of Addis Zemen, this town has a latitude and longitude of 11°55′N 37°42′E with an elevation of 1828 meters above sea level. It is the administrative center of Fogera woreda.

== History ==
Wereta appears in the Royal chronicles during the first reign of Emperor Tekle Giyorgis (1779-1784), as the place whence Ras Hailu Eshte fled after escaping imprisonment in Gondar.

Wereta was included as one of the stages of the Gondar-Boso trade route of the 1840s, located immediately south of the Reb River, according to a list compiled by Antoine Thomson d'Abbadie in his Geodesie d'Ethiopie.

20th Century

In 1967, telephone service reached Wereta, and in 1978, the town received electricity.

In the 1990s, a new campus for the Wereta College of Agriculture was designed by National Consultants (chief architect Assefa Bekele), with a proposed budget of 60 million Birr. Located on top of a hill next to the road to Bahir Dar, the college has a capacity of 2000 students and graduated 269 students in 2004.

Wereta has two elementary schools, one high school, as well as vocational schools.

== Demographics ==
Based on figures from the Central Statistical Agency in 2005, Wereta has an estimated total population of 26,317, of whom 13,044 were males and 13,273 were females. Previously, the 1994 census reported the town had a total population of 15,181 of whom 6,863 were males and 8,313 were females.

== Transport ==
Two trans-African automobile routes pass through Wereta:

- Cairo-Cape Town Highway
- Ndjamena-Djibouti Highway
