= Gazbibla =

Gazgibla ጋዝጊብላ
- Woreda
- Flag
- Zone: Wag Hemra
- Region: Amhara Region

Area
  - Total: 1,037.42 km^{2} (400.55 sq mi)

Population (2012 est.)
  - Total: 76,297
  - Density: 73.54/km^{2} (190.48/sq mi)

Gazgibla (Amharic: ጋዝጊብላ) is one of the woredas in the Amhara Region of Ethiopia. Part of the Wag Hemra Zone, Gazgibla is bordered on the south by the Semien (North) Wollo Zone, on the west by Dehana and the Semien (North) Gondar Zone, and on the north by Sekota. Gazgibla was separated from Dehana woreda.

== Demographics ==
A 2012 estimate puts the population at 76,297. This gives a population density of 73.54 people per square kilometer (190.48 people per square mile), given its area of 1,037.42 square kilometers (400.55 square miles), higher than the Wag Hemra Zone average of 51.28 people per square kilometer (132.81 people per square mile). Based on the 2007 national census conducted by the Central Statistical Agency of Ethiopia (CSA), this woreda has a total population of 70,854, of whom 35,581 are men and 35,273 women; none are urban inhabitants.

The majority of the inhabitants practiced Ethiopian Orthodox Christianity, with 99.92% reporting that as their religion.
