= Lay Gayint =

District in Amhara Region, Ethiopia

Lay Gayint ላይ ጋይንት
- Woreda
- Location within Ethiopia
- Coordinates: 12°00′N 38°20′E
- Zone: Debub Gondar
- Region: Amhara Region

Area
  - Total: 1,522.43 km^{2} (587.81 sq mi)

Population (2012 est.)
  - Total: 225,830
  - Density: 148.34/km^{2} (384.19/sq mi)

Lay Gayint (Amharic: ላይ ጋይንት, lit. 'Upper Gayint') is a woreda in the Amhara Region of Ethiopia. Part of the Debub Gondar Zone, Lay Gayint is bordered on the south by Tach Gayint and Simada, on the southwest by Misraq Este, on the west by Farta, on the north by Ebenat, and on the east by the Semien Wollo Zone. The administrative center is Nefas Mewcha; other towns in Lay Guyint include Gobgob and Sali.

The altitude of this woreda varies from 1,500 to 3,100 metres (4,900 to 10,200 ft) above sea level. The annual rainfall is erratically distributed and varies from 400 to 1,100 millimetres (16 to 43 in). A notable landmark in Lay Guyint is the church of the village of Betlehem, about 65 kilometres (40 mi) southeast of Debre Tabor; inside an ordinary round church structure is an ancient church with a trussed roof of identical construction as the church of Debre Damo. The writer Thomas Pakenham was the first non-Ethiopian to visit this church in 1955.

== Notable figures ==
Notable figures from this small town include Ambachew Mekonnen who served as the President of the Amhara regional state up until his murder during an attempted coup.

== Demographics ==
A 2012 estimate puts the population at 225,830. This gives a population density of 148.34 people per square kilometer (384.19 people per square mile), given its area of 1,522.43 square kilometers (587.81 square miles), lower than the South Gondar Zone average of 158.85 people per square kilometer (411.43 people per square mile).

Based on the 2007 national census conducted by the Central Statistical Agency of Ethiopia (CSA), this woreda has a total population of 206,499, an increase of 23.56% over the 1994 census, of whom 104,401 are men and 102,098 women; 22,825 or 11.05% are urban inhabitants. With an area of 1,522.43 square kilometres (587.81 sq mi), Lay Gayint has a population density of 135.64 people per square kilometre (351.3/sq mi), which is less than the Zone average of 145.56 persons per square kilometer. A total of 46,038 households were counted in this woreda, resulting in an average of 4.49 persons to a household, and 44,494 housing units. The 1994 national census reported a total population for this woreda of 167,122 in 33,681 households, of whom 84,585 were men and 82,537 were women; 13,583 or 8.13% of its population were urban dwellers.

In 1994 the largest ethnic group reported in Lay Guyint was the Amhara (99.88%). Amharic was spoken as a first language by 99.84%. The majority 97.6% of the population practiced Ethiopian Orthodox Christianity with 97.6% professing that belief, while 2.27% of the population said they were Muslim. This was much the same in 2007, with 97.47% reporting Ethiopian Orthodox Christianity as their religion, while 2.47% of the population said they were Muslim.
