= Tewodros II Secondary School =

Secondary school in Ethiopia

Information
- Established: 1967; 59 years ago
- Grades: 9-12
- Enrollment: c.4000

Tewodros II Secondary School is located in Debre Tabor, Ethiopia, named after Emperor Tewodros II.

== Community ==
Spanning 4 square kilometers, Tewodros II Secondary School serves the educational needs to the historic city of Debre Tabor and other Woredas which are around Debre Tabor. The school located towards the east part of the city.

== School ==
Tewodros II Secondary School is a comprehensive four-year public high school enrolling more than 4000 students in grades 9 through 12. The school opened in the fall of 1967 and graduated its first senior class in the spring of 1971. Tewodros II Secondary School is accredited by Ethiopian Ministry of Education.

== Curriculum ==
The academic program is organized on a rotating block schedule. Courses offered include Biology, Computer, Maths, Chemistry, Physics, English, Amharic, History, Civic, Economics, etc. in two streams: Social Science and Natural Science.
