= Nefas Mewcha =

Town in Amhara Region, Ethiopia

- Town
- Location within Ethiopia
- Coordinates: 11°44′N 38°28′E
- Country: Ethiopia
- Region: Amhara
- Zone: Debub Gondar
- Elevation: 3,150 m (10,330 ft)

Population (2005)
  - Total: 18,691
- Time zone: UTC+3 (EAT)

Nefas Mewcha is a town in northern Ethiopia. Located in the Debub Gondar Zone of the Amhara Region, this town has a latitude and longitude of 11°44′N 38°28′E and an elevation of 3150 meters above sea level. It is the administrative center of Lay Gayint woreda.

Nefas Mewcha lies on the main Debre Tabor - Weldiya highway (also known as the Chinese road), providing it with an all-year link to the Zonal capital of Weldiya.

== History ==
One of the earliest mentions of Nefas Mewcha is in the Royal chronicle of Emperor Susenyos, where the Emperor stopped during his campaign against the rebel Yona'el in 1620.

The Scots explorer James Bruce, who visited Ethiopia in the early 1770s, described Nefas Mewcha as "in the farthest limits" of the province of Begemder at the time, with the Wollo Oromo ruling the territories "behind this". James Bruce mentioned that the area south-east of Nefas Mewcha was a natural Barrier against the Oromo expansions and prevented them from settling in Begemder. In the last years of his reign, emperor Iyoas I fought a battle against the governor of Begemder, Ya Mariam Bariaw, who had killed his uncle Birale in an earlier battle. Ya Mariam Bariaw was defeated, and severely wounded; he fled to the nearby Wollo, who handed Ya Mariam Bariaw back to the half-Oromo Emperor for punishment.

By 1964, Nefas Mewcha was the administrative center of Gayint awraja.

Amnesty International reported that between 12-21 August 2021, during the Tigrayan People's Liberation Front (TPLF) occupation of the Amharan town of Nefas Mewcha. Fighters from Tigray committed heinous crimes against humanity against women including mass rape, gang rape, physical and verbal assaults, on top of looting medical facilities and private property.

== Demographics ==
Based on figures from the Central Statistical Agency in 2005, Nefas Mewcha has an estimated total population of 18,691, of whom 9,009 are men and 9,682 were women. The 1994 census reported this town had a total population of 10,808, of whom 4,780 were men and 6,068 were women.
