= Alem Ber =

Coordinates: 11°54′47″N 37°53′5″E

Alem Ber (also known as Amed Ber) is a town located in the northern part of the Amhara Region of Ethiopia. It is one of two cities in Fogera woreda.

== Overview ==
The population of Alem Ber and its surrounding mostly depends on trade and agriculture. The place also serves as source of butter, pepper and cereals which are exported to Debre Tabor and Worota. In addition, some part of the population depends on traditional industries. For example, Muslim population largely depends on cottage industries by producing traditional clothes known as shemma. Others produce beverage in traditional ways like tella and areki which constitutes much of the local alcohol consumption.

On the other hand, the culture is like most north part of Ethiopia. In addition, this place is known with its nickname: Amora Gedel, where the Italians heading through Debre Tabour were defeated, which was actually the original name of the place. The place has been known for its patriots, beloved people, and the long-standing school where many scholars started their schooling since 1972. Schools like Alem Ber Elementary School and Alem Ber High School give opportunities to students in Alem Ber and its surroundings.

== Demographics ==
Based on figures from the Central Statistical Agency in 2005, Alem Ber has an estimated total population of 5,517 of whom 2,623 are men and 2,894 are women. The 1994 census reported this town had a total population of 3,194 of whom 1,380 were men and 1,814 were women. In 2013, the population grew to 13,201.
