= Walda Giyorgis =

Ethiopian clergyman (died 1918)

Walda Giyorgis (Note: Walda Giyorgis is also spelled in various sources as Walda-Giyorgis) (died June 1918) was an Ethiopian ecclesiastic during the reign of Menelik II.

== Biography ==
=== Early years ===
Walda Giyorgis was a monk of Amhara lineage, who in his early years, served at the monastery of Mahbere Selassie, near the border town of Metemma in Begemder province.

=== Gojjam period ===
He was summoned to the court of Negus Tekle Haymanot, where he gradually accumulated influence, and became the chief confessor (Alaqa) of the Negus. Walda Giyorgis accompanied his Negus to Embabo, when on 6 June 1882, he witnessed (some sources say he inspired soldiers and took part in) the Battle of Embabo. The Shewan forces won out against the Gojjames, and took Tekle Haymanot prisoner. Thereafter, at Menelik's invitation, he went to the victor's court in Shewa.

=== Under Menelik II ===
He taught church education at Entoto Raguel Church in the northern outskirts of Addis Ababa. His star pupil, Heruy Wolde Selassie became one of Ethiopia's most iconic litterateur.

Over the years, Walda Giyorgis gained Menelik's trust, and in 1896, following the victory over the Italian invaders at the Battle of Adwa, he was elevated as the Nebura-ed (Note: Nebura-ed is a traditional Ethiopian ecclesiastic title, usually referring to the senior administrator of Aksum.) of Aksum. Walda Giyorgis was thus invested with significant control over Tigray Province; his contemporaries called him ‘‘Menelik II's agent in Tigray.
