= Mirab Este =

District in Amhara Region, Ethiopia

Mirab Este ምዕራብ እስቴ
- Woreda
- Flag
- Interactive map of Mirab Este
- Zone: Debub Gondar
- Region: Amhara

Area
  - Total: 809.65 km^{2} (312.61 sq mi)

Population (2012 est.)
  - Total: 130,504
  - Density: 161.19/km^{2} (417.47/sq mi)

Mirab Este (Amharic: ምዕራብ እስቴ) is one of the woredas in the Amhara Region of Ethiopia. Part of the Debub Gondar Zone, Mirab Este is bordered on the south by the Abay River which separates it from the Misraq Gojjam Zone and Mirab Gojjam Zone, on the west by Dera, and on the north and east by Misraq Este. Towns in Mirab Este include Jara Gedo.

== Demographics ==
A 2012 estimate puts the population at 130,504. This gives a population density of 161.19 people per square kilometer (417.47 people per square mile), given its area of 809.65 square kilometers (312.61 square miles), slightly higher than the South Gondar Zone average of 158.85 people per square kilometer (411.43 people per square mile).

Based on the 2007 national census conducted by the Central Statistical Agency of Ethiopia (CSA), this woreda has a total population of 120,885, of whom 62,021 are men and 58,864 women; 2,192 or 1.81% are urban inhabitants. The majority of the inhabitants practiced Ethiopian Orthodox Christianity, with 98.61% reporting that as their religion, while 1.38% of the population said they were Muslim.
