= Soqota =

Town in Amhara Région, Ethiopia

Sekota ሰቆጣ Sokota, Sakota, &c.
- Town
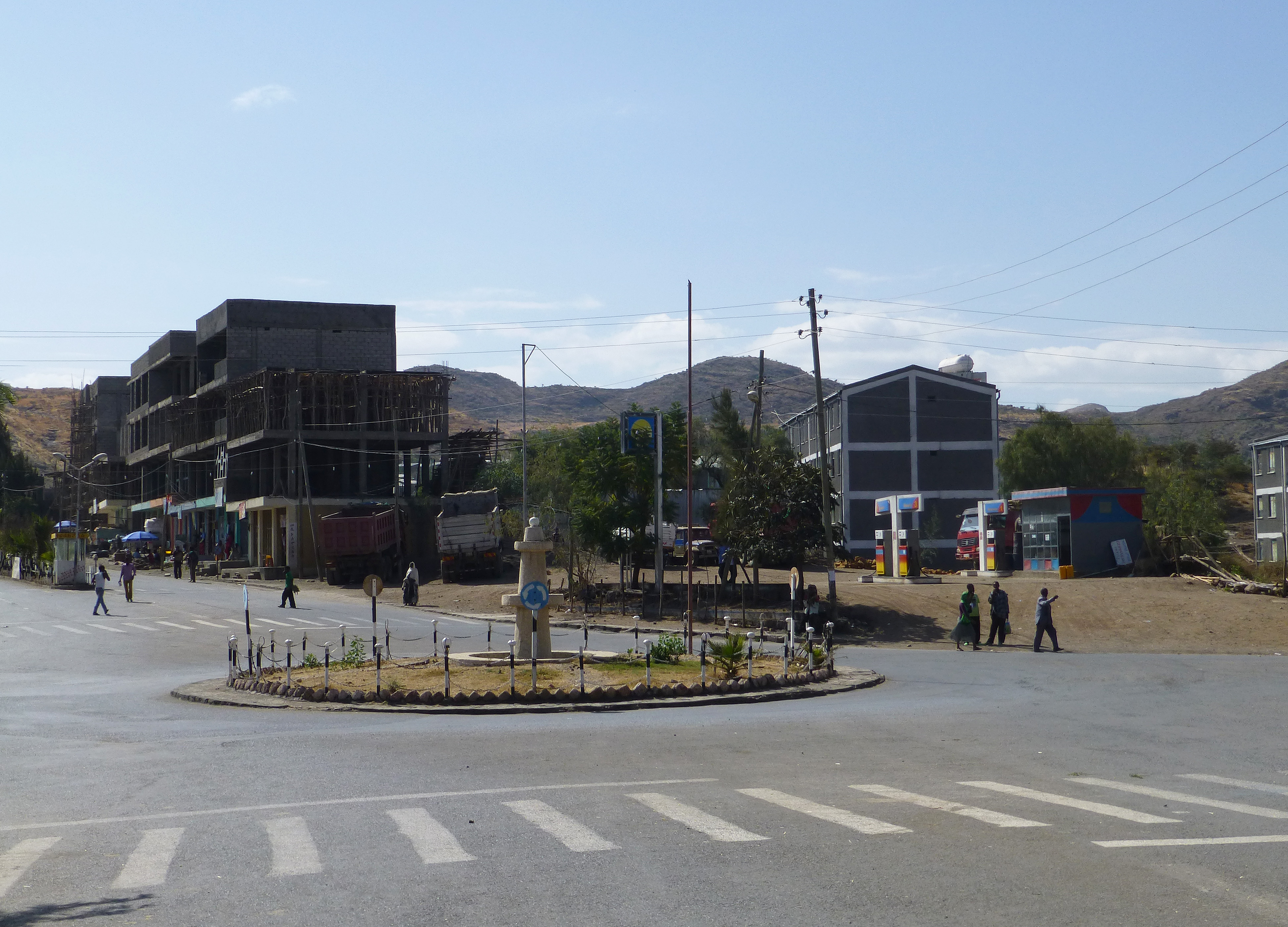

- Location within Ethiopia Location within the Horn of Africa Location within Africa
- Coordinates: 12°37′31″N 39°02′06″E
- Country: Ethiopia
- Region: Amhara
- Zone: Wag Hemra Zone

Population (2007)
  - Total: 22,346
- Time zone: UTC+3 (EAT)

Sekota, also spelled Sokota, Sakota, Soqota (Amharic: ሰቆጣ; formerly ሰቈጣ) is a town and separate woreda in northern Ethiopia. The name is likely from the Agaw word sakute/ሳቑጠ, "fortified village." Located in the Wag Hemra Zone of the Amhara Region, Sekota has a latitude and longitude of 12°37′31″N 39°02′06″E and an elevation of 2266 meters above sea level. It is surrounded by woreda of Soqota.

About 6 kilometers from Sekota is the church Wuqir Meskale Kristos, where the mummified corpses of several Wagshums lies.

== History ==
Philip Briggs speculates that this town may be identified with the mysterious Kubar, said by al-Ya'qubi and al-Masudi to have succeeded Axum as the capital of Ethiopia.

Sekota is the historic seat of the Wagshum, the former ruler of Lasta, who claimed to trace an unbroken succession back to the last king of the Zagwe dynasty. However, verification for this tradition is slight. This town is not mentioned in the surviving records until 1746, when the soldiers of Emperor Iyasu II burned it down. The traveler Augustus B. Wylde wrote in the 1890s that the palace of the Wagshums in this town had been built around 1650. It was a three-storey structure which could not be dated with any precision, but he believed the masons and craftsmen were some of those who had worked at Gondar.

Nathaniel Pearce, notes that Sekota was where Ras Haile Wand Bewossen had his palace in 1813, and performed his annual review of his troops on 17 Masqaram, as was the custom. Charles Beke, who passed through Sekota in April 1843, described it as "a place of considerable size but is so very straggling that it is not easy to form a definite idea on the subject. It has a large market, held on Tuesday and Wednesday weekly, which is frequented by the merchants of the south and west, this place is the grand center of the salt-trade, the Tigre merchants coming thus far only, and then returning." In Wylde's time, the market at Sekota was still held each week on Tuesdays and Wednesdays.

=== 20th century ===
During the Second Italo-Ethiopian War, Sekota was occupied by the Italians on 28 March 1936. During their occupation, the Italians built a road to Sekota passable by motorcars, and repaired the town's mosque. Beatrice Playne visited the town in late autumn of 1948, and found it "quite the most attractive Ethiopian town I have seen". She describes its "two-storied, stone houses, each with a little private garden, lying snugly amongst the surrounding wall of hills, like a Cotswold village", and its government offices were in "a low, Italian building in a square of grass."

Sekota was briefly held by the Tigrayan People's Liberation Front (TPLF) during the Ethiopian Civil War around 1980. In 1988, Sekota was the base of the Ethiopian People's Democratic Movement, founded by a group of former EPRP fighters, which operated in northern Wollo jointly with the TPLF.

The town holds an EPDM war memorial.

=== 21st century ===
==== Tigray War ====
EEPA an NGO, reported that the Tigray Defence Forces controlled Sekota in Amhara on 16 August 2021. Government forces then retook the town on 22 December 2021

== Demographics ==
A 2012 estimate puts the population at 27,459. Based on the 2007 national census conducted by the Central Statistical Agency of Ethiopia (CSA), this town has a total population of 22,346, of whom 10,760 are men and 11,586 women. The majority of the inhabitants practiced Ethiopian Orthodox Christianity, with 95.98% reporting that as their religion, while 3.8% were Muslim. The 1994 census reported this town had a total population of 7,922 of whom 3,476 were males and 4,446 were females.
