= Berhanu Denqe =

Ethiopian author and diplomat

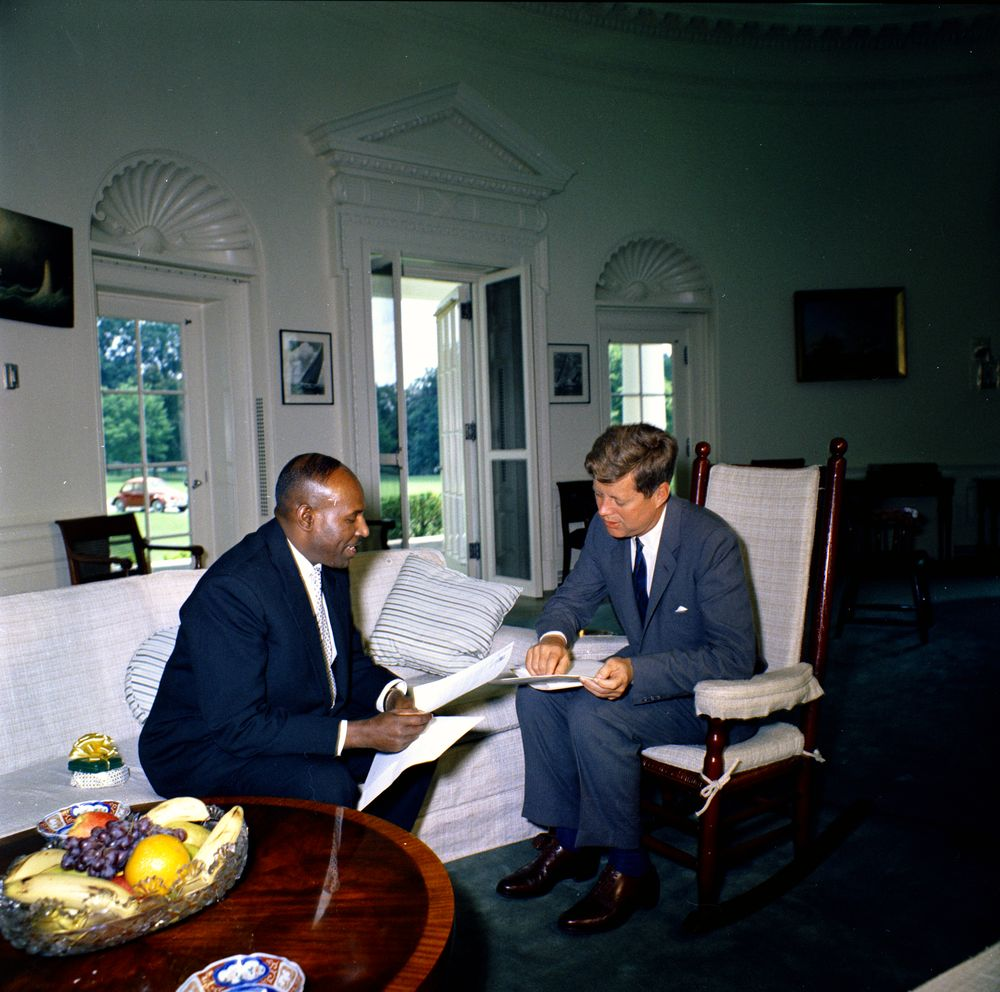
Berhanu Denqe with President J.F. Kennedy at the White House, Oval Office (May 23, 1961).

Berhanu Denqe (Amharic: ብርሃኑ ድንቄ, 1918–June 18, 1992) was an Ethiopian author and diplomat. He was born to Aleqa Denqe, the head of the Entoto Raguel and Wechacha Mariam churches, and he died in Jefferson City, Missouri. He had a traditional Ethiopian Orthodox as well as Western education. He wrote ቄሳር እና አብዮት፣ ብቻዬን ቆሜያለሁ and አረሩ።. His other works are የኢትዮጵያ አጭር ታሪክ which was used as a textbook in the 1940s, and a play about Makeda, the Queen of Sheba (ንግሥተ ዓዜብ).

Berhanu Denqe’s ቄሳር እና አብዮት reveals some of the posts he held in Ethiopia, including the ministries of education and foreign affairs in the 1940s and 1950s. There are some anecdotal references to members of the nobility in high offices clashing with Berhanu over issues such as telephone bills. Berhanu was later sent to the USA as counselor to the Ethiopian embassy in 1955. He then became the ambassador in 1961 and stayed in the same post for about five years. In 1965, he resigned and went into exile. This is also explained in his book ቄሳር እና አብዮት. Later, he resigned to life in Jefferson City, Missouri where he wrote political booklets such as I stand Alone.

ቄሳር እና አብዮት is a memoir about Emperor Haile Selassie’s reign. In this book, Berhanu accuses the emperor of repeated attempts at his life while abroad and the suffering of his old mother in Ethiopia. Nevertheless, the book does not incriminate the emperor. The reason behind writing it was the incessant attacks at the emperor by the Derg and reflections on whether the emperor's rule was as terrible as portrayed by his successors.
