= Farta =

District in Amhara Region, Ethiopia

Coordinates: 12°00′N 38°00′E

Farta ፋርጣ
- Woreda
- Flag
- Interactive map of Farta
- Zone: Debub Gondar
- Region: Amhara Region

Area
  - Total: 1,099.25 km^{2} (424.42 sq mi)

Population (2012 est.)
  - Total: 251,047
  - Density: 228.380/km^{2} (591.502/sq mi)

Farta (Amharic: ፋርጣ) is a woreda in the Amhara Region of Ethiopia. Part of the Debub Gondar Zone, Farta is bordered on the south by Misraq Este, on the west by Fogera, on the north by Ebenat and on the east by Guna Woreda (whose center is Kimir Dingay). The town of Debre Tabor is surrounded by Farta.

== Demographics ==
A 2012 estimate puts the population at 251,047. This gives a population density of 228.38 people per square kilometer (591.50 people per square mile), given its area of 1099.25 square kilometers (424.42 square miles), much higher than the South Gondar Zone average of 158.85 people per square kilometer (411.43 people per square mile).

Based on the 2007 national census conducted by the Central Statistical Agency of Ethiopia (CSA), this woreda has a total population of 232,181, an increase of 1.49% over the 1994 census, of whom 118,513 are men and 113,668 women; 6,783 or 2.92% are urban inhabitants. With an area of 1,099.25 square kilometers, Farta has a population density of 211.22, which is greater than the Zone average of 145.56 persons per square kilometer. A total of 49,986 households were counted in this woreda, resulting in an average of 4.64 persons to a household, and 48,465 housing units.

The 1994 national census reported a total population for this woreda of 228,772 in 47,812 households, of whom 118,696 were men and 110,076 were women; 3,552 or 1.55% of its population were urban dwellers.

The largest ethnic group reportedin 1994 in Farta was the Amhara (99.95%), Amharic was spoken as a first language by 99.96%, and 99.57% of the population practiced Ethiopian Orthodox Christianity. By 2007 this had changed very little, with 99.61% reporting that as their religion.
