= Cotton production in Ethiopia =

Aspect of the economy of Ethiopia

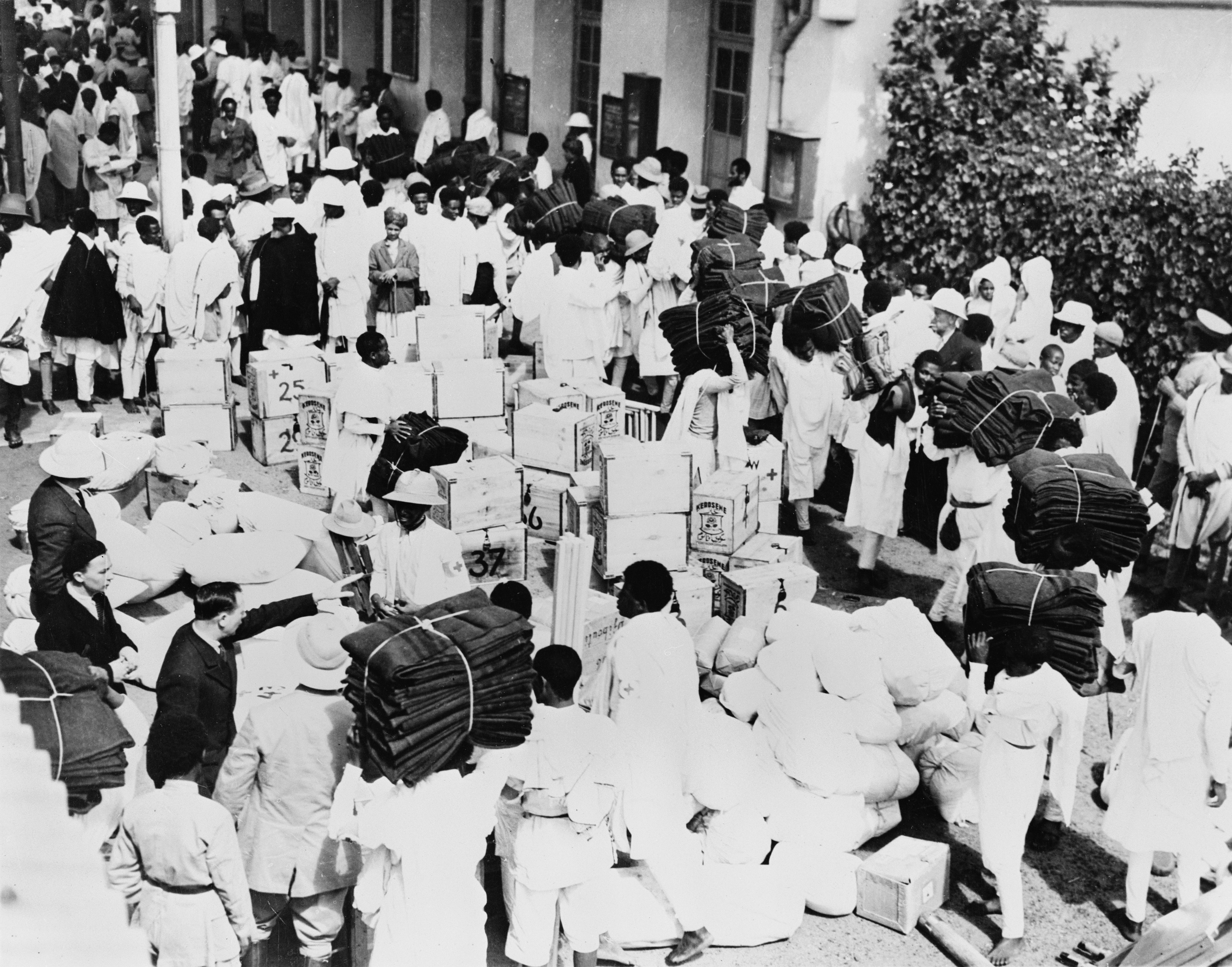
Addis Ababa, Ethiopia. Medical supplies for the front, including bales of cotton

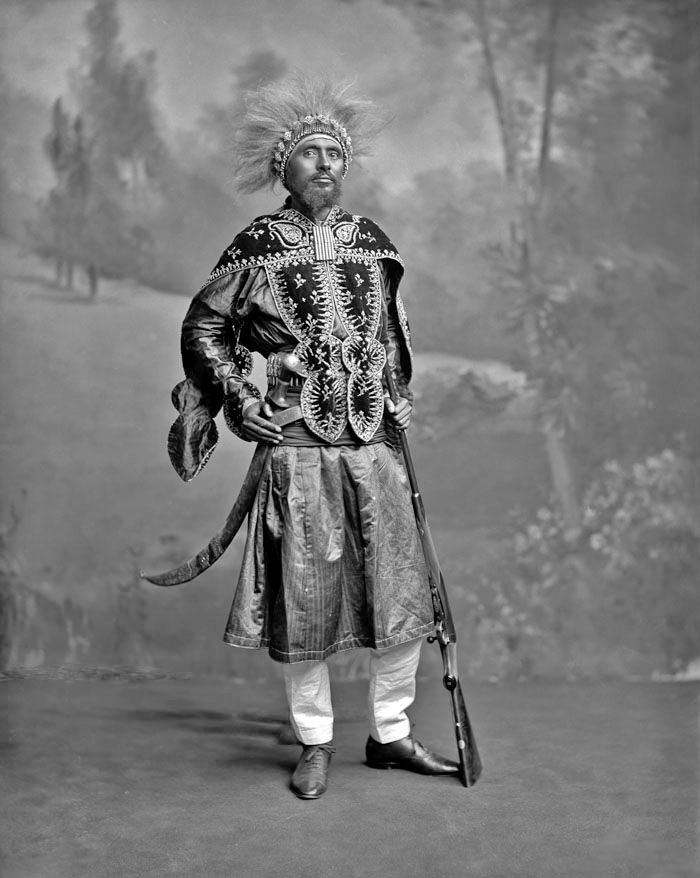
Cummerbund of silk; closely fitting jodphur-like white cotton trousers. probably made by Serouphi Ebeyan, dressmaker to the Ethiopian Court.

Cotton is grown throughout Ethiopia at elevations above 1000 meters and below 1400 meters. Because most of the lowlands lack adequate rainfall, cotton cultivation depends largely on irrigation.

== History ==
Cotton production has long been underway in Ethiopia. Before the revolution, large-scale commercial cotton plantations were developed in the Awash Valley and the Humera areas. The Tendaho Cotton Plantation in the lower Awash Valley was one of Ethiopia's largest cotton plantations. Rain-fed cotton also grew in Humera, Bilate, and Arba Minch.

In 1867 it was reported that there were plans to construct a 362-kilometre (225-mile) road from the Ethiopian cotton fields to the Red Sea to trade with Egypt and Turkey. Since the revolution, most commercial cotton has been grown on irrigated state farms, mostly in the Awash Valley area. Production jumped from 43,500 tons in 1974/75 to 74,900 tons in 1984/85. Similarly, the area of cultivation increased from 22,600 hectares in 1974/75 to 33,900 hectares in 1984/85.

Given its excellent growing conditions, abundance of raw materials and availability of land, Ethiopia has the potential to become a major global cotton producer but the cotton industry in Ethiopia as of 2011 is far behind that of the coffee industry and cereal production. There are however, significant obstacles to the development of the industry in Ethiopia due to a distinct lack of administrative bodies to monitor and certify agricultural practices in the country and to process cotton in factories on a wide-scale commercial level. However, the development of the textile industry is a priority of the Ethiopian government in their economic growth strategy and in 2006 implemented an important privatization initiative to attract foreign and private enterprises to develop the sector. Despite its lack of governance, the Ethiopian cotton industry supplied some 50,000 tons annually to the textile industry of Ethiopia as of 2002. By the late 2010s the country was no longer self-sufficient in cotton: the United States Department of Agriculture estimated lint cotton production at 38,000 metric tons (176,000 bales) in marketing year 2017/18 and forecast 57,000 metric tons (262,000 bales) in 2019/20, while domestic textile-industry consumption had risen to roughly 64,000 metric tons, leaving a supply gap met by imports.
