= Aleqa =

Honorific title for priest in the Ethiopian Orthodox Tewahedo Church

The title Aleqa ("Master", also transliterated Alaqa) is a honorific title used in the Ethiopian Orthodox Tewahedo Church. It is used as the title of a chief priest of a major church, the head of a monastery, as well as being an honorific for a highly educated member of the church, especially in the case of dabtaras.

An Alaqa is responsible for maintaining order in the church, as well as the administration.
