= Wag Hemra Zone =

Zone in Amhara Region of Ethiopia

Coordinates: 12°45′N 38°45′E

Waghemira ዋግ ኽምራ
- Zone
- Interactive map of Waghemira
- Country: Ethiopia
- Region: Amhara

Area
  - Total: 9,039.04 km^{2} (3,489.99 sq mi)

Population (2012 est.)
  - Total: 463,505
  - Density: 51.28/km^{2} (132.81/sq mi)

A map of the regions and zones of Ethiopia

Wag Hemra (Amharic: ዋግ ኽምራ), also spelled Waghemira, is a Zone in the Amhara Region of Ethiopia. Its name is a combination of the former province of Wag, and the dominant local ethnic group, the Kamyr (or "Hemra") Agaw. Wag Hemra is bordered on the south by Semien Wollo, on the southwest by Debub (South) Gondar, on the west by Semen (North) Gondar, and on the north and east by the Tigray Region. Towns in Wag Hemra include Soqota.

== Demographics ==
A 2012 estimate puts the population at 463,505. This gives a population density of 51.28 people per square kilometer (132.81 people per square mile), given its area of 9,039.04 square kilometers (3,489.99 square miles).

Based on the 2007 Census conducted by the Central Statistical Agency of Ethiopia (CSA), this Zone has a total population of 426,213, an increase of 54.64% over the 1994 census, of whom 213,845 are men and 212,368 women. With an area of 9,039.04 square kilometers, Wag Hemra has a population density of 47.15; 29,951 or 7.03% are urban inhabitants. A total of 102,098 households were counted in this Zone, which results in an average of 4.17 persons to a household, and 98,222 housing units. The 1994 national census reported a total population for this Zone of 275,615 in 70,474 households, of whom 139,301 were men and 136,314 women; 11,643 or 4.22% of its population were urban dwellers at the time.

In 1994 the three largest ethnic groups reported in Wag Hemra were the Kamyr Agaw (51.24%), the Amhara (47.18%), and the Tigrayan (1.5%); all other ethnic groups made up 0.08% of the population. Amharic was spoken as a first language by 50.92%, 46.85% spoke Kamyr, and 2.19% spoke Tigrinya; the remaining 0.04% spoke all other primary languages reported. 99.6% practiced Ethiopian Orthodox Christianity. By 2007 this had shifted slightly, with the three largest ethnic groups reported in Wag Hemra still being the Kamyr Agaw (52.92%), the Amhara (45.45%), and the Tigrayan (1.39%); all other ethnic groups made up 0.24% of the population. Amharic was spoken as a first language by 56.27%, 41.82% spoke Kamyr, and 1.67% spoke Tigrinya; the remaining 0.24% spoke all other primary languages reported. 99.62% practiced Ethiopian Orthodox Christianity.

According to a May 24, 2004 World Bank memorandum, 5% of the inhabitants of Wag Hemra have access to electricity, this zone has a road density of 30.3 kilometers per 1000 square kilometers (compared to the national average of 30 kilometers), the average rural household has 0.9 hectares of land (compared to the national average of 1.01 hectare of land and a regional average of 0.51) and the equivalent of 0.9 heads of livestock. 8% of the population is in non-farm related jobs, compared to the national average of 25% and a Regional average of 21%. 35% of all eligible children are enrolled in primary school, and 5% in secondary schools. 100% of the zone is exposed to malaria, and none to Tsetse fly. The memorandum gave this zone a drought risk rating of 622.
