= Debre Tabor =

Town in Amhara Region, Ethiopia

Debre Tabor ደብረ ታቦር
- City
- Street in Downtown Debre Tabor

- Location in Ethiopia
- Coordinates: 11°51′N 38°1′E
- Country: Ethiopia
- Region: Amhara
- Zone: Debub Gondar

Area
  - Total: 110.88 km^{2} (42.81 sq mi)
- Elevation: 2,706 m (8,878 ft)

Population (2007)
  - Total: 55,596
  - Estimate (2021): 119,176
  - Density: 501.41/km^{2} (1,298.6/sq mi)
- Time zone: UTC+3 (EAT)
- ZIP Code: 6300
- Area code: 058
- Website: cityofdebretabor.org

Debre Tabor (Amharic: ደብረ ታቦር, lit. "Mount Tabor") is a town and woreda in northern Ethiopia. Located in the Debub Gondar Zone of the Amhara Region, about 100 kilometers southeast of Gondar and 50 kilometers east of Lake Tana, this historic town has a latitude and longitude of 11°51′N 38°1′E with an elevation of 2,706 metres (8,878 ft) above sea level. The presence of at least 48 springs in the area contributed to the development of Debre Tabor.

Debre Tabor is served by an airport (ICAO code HADT, IATA DBT).

== History ==
=== Origin ===
Authorities differ over the facts of its founding. Locals say Seyfa Ared IV (Amharic: ሰይፈ አርድ ፬ኛ) (1294–1295) discovered Debre Tabor in the 13th century. Mordechai Abir states that it was founded by Ras Ali I; however, Richard Pankhurst gives a detailed account of its foundation by Ras Gugsa, and includes the tradition that the location was selected with supernatural help. In either case, Debre Tabor was the seat of the Regents of the Emperor in the 18th and 19th centuries, from which periods several churches and the ruins of two palaces survive. Debre Tabor was the capital of Ethiopia under two Emperors: Tewodros II and Yohannes IV. As a result, in the 19th century the population of this town varied depending on whether the emperor was in residence. If he was present, the population could reach 30,000 as it did under Emperor Yohannes; if he was not, it would be around 5,000 people.

=== 19th century ===
Debre Tabor was sacked by an army from the province of Lasta in 1835. The Battle of Debre Tabor was fought nearby on February 6, 1842; although Dejazmach Wube Haile Maryam and his allies defeated the armies of Ras Ali II and sacked Debre Tabor once again, they were surprised while celebrating their victory by Birru Aligas, an ally of Ras Ali, who captured Wube and his son and extracted concessions from them in return for their release.

Ras Ali built four churches in Debre Tabor: Iyasus on the mountain to the southeast, Ennatitu Maryam and Legitu Maryam to the east, and Tegur Mikael to the north. A second palace was built for his mother, the Empress Menen Liben Amede, which was not as large as Ras Ali's.

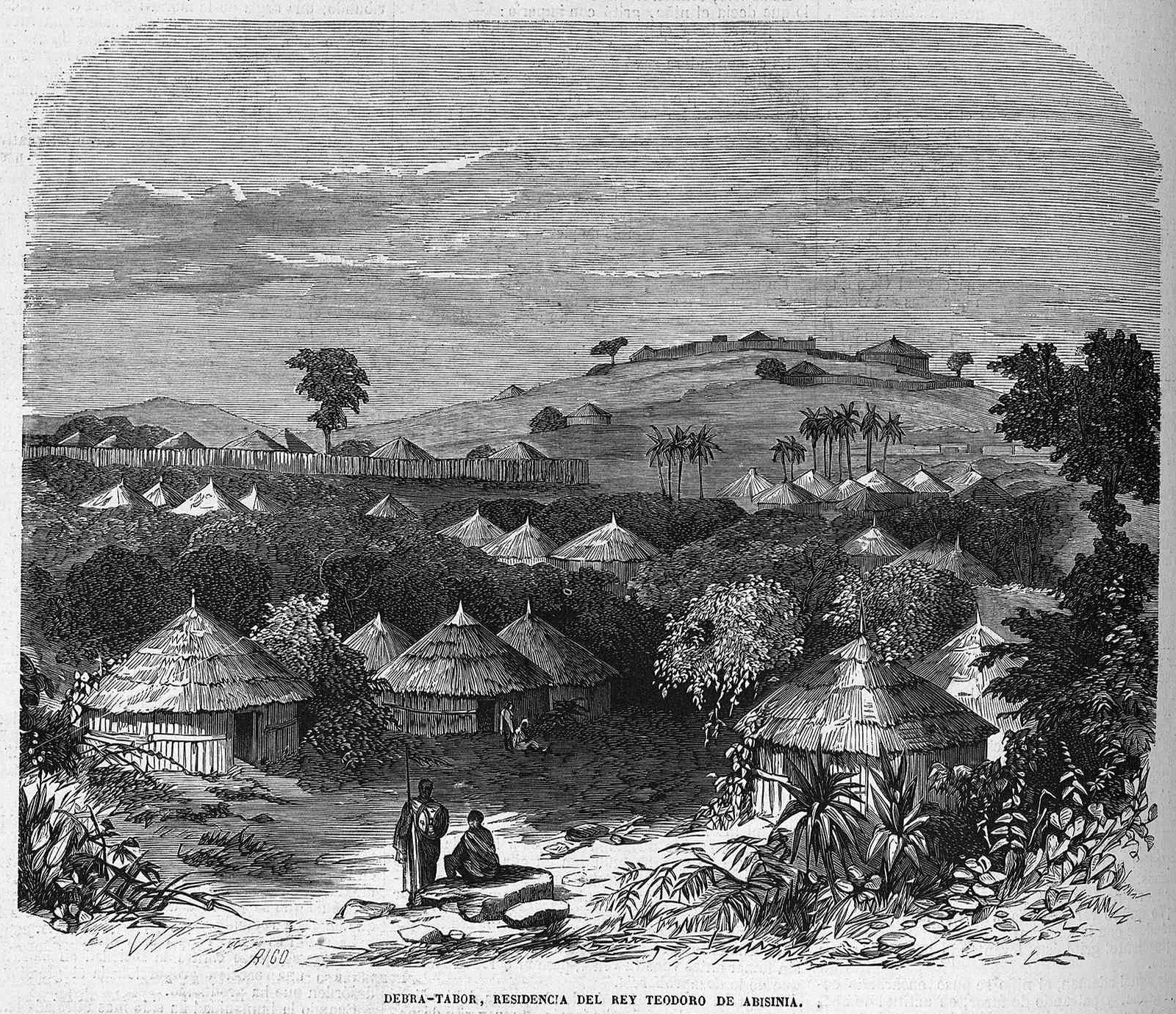
Debre Tabor in El Museo Universal, 1868

Although he burnt the town in May 1853, following Ras Ali's defeat, Emperor Tewodros used Debre Tabor as his capital until his situation weakened so badly that he was forced to abandon the town in the last year of his reign in 1867 for his stronghold on Maqdala. The Emperor Yohannes IV often resided at Debre Tabor, and during his reign Heruy Giyorgis church was built. Here the Emperor met with General Gordon in October 1878, who was representing the Egyptian government, about Ethiopian demands for access to the Red Sea. It was also in Debre Tabor that Tekle Haymanot was crowned Negus of Gojjam in January 1881.

=== 20th century ===
When the Bank of Ethiopia was created in 1931 it opened a branch office with two employees at Debre Tabor. During the Second Italian-Abyssinian War, Debre Tabor was occupied by unit which advanced from Bahir Dar on 28 April. During the occupation, a telegraph office was opened in the town and postal service restored. The Italians also constructed a road from Gondar via Debre Tabor to Dessie. The first mosque in Debre Tabor was constructed and eucalyptus planting extended. Despite these improvements, as early as August 1937, there were almost simultaneous but apparently uncoordinated attacks by arbegnoch on garrisons near Debre Tabor and near Bahir Dar. After several months of attacks, the British convinced Colonel Angelini to surrender the town 6 July 1941, allowing the British to advance towards the organized Italian resistance around Gondar under the command of Guglielmo Nasi, who by this point was the acting Viceroy and Governor-General of Italian East Africa.

In 1958, Debre Tabor was one of 27 places in Ethiopia ranked as First Class Township.

In 1967 an Irish travel writer, Dervla Murphy, visited Debre Tabor and reported that the population was about 7,000 with sometimes as many as 3,000 outsiders attending the Saturday market.

In September 1975, after the beginning of Derg rule, Debre Tabor was seized by a group of local landlords and their followers in opposition to the government, killing the provincial governor and expelling both a Chinese road-building team and missionaries of the Seventh Day Adventist Church who ran a local hospital. Government control was reestablished within a month.

In late December 1989, Tigray People's Liberation Front (TPLF) forces captured Debre Tabor, claiming that they killed or wounded more than 8,000 government troops. Around 20 January 1990, the Ethiopian News Agency announced that government forces had recaptured Debre Tabor. A few days later, the clandestine radio of the TPLF claimed a major victory in battles near Debre Tabor on 22–24 January 1990, claiming their soldiers had killed 3,914 government troops and captured 270. Although the town was retaken by government troops a few days later, the TPLF, announced the recapture of the town after a three-day battle in late February. About a year later, on 23 February 1990, the town was used as the jumping-off point for Operation Tewodros.

=== 21st century ===
In early August 2023, Debre Tabor was the site of fierce clashes between Fano militiamen and the Ethiopian National Defense Force (ENDF). On February 11 2026, Fano entered Debre Tabor where they burned down the Civil Service Department, the Zonal Police Department, the Zonal Chief Administrator's guesthouse and other government intuitions. Drone strikes where then conducted, killing 4 civilians and an unknown number of Fano fighters. Fano later withdrew from the city shortly after.

== Climate ==
Debre Tabor has a comfortable climate all year round.

The warm season lasts for 4.3 months, from January 30 to June 8, with an average daily high temperature above 73°F. The hottest month of the year in Debre Tabor is April, with an average high of 75°F and low of 57°F.

The cool season lasts for 2.1 months, from July 11 to September 13, with an average daily high temperature below 66°F. The coldest month of the year in Debre Tabor is August, with an average low of 54°F and high of 64°F.

== Demographics ==
A 2021 estimate puts the population at 119,176. This gives a population density of 1,074.81 people per square kilometer (2,783.84 people per square mile) given its area of 110.88 square kilometers (42.81 square miles), about an order of magnitude higher than the South Gondar Zone average of 158.85 people per square kilometer (411.43 people per square mile).

Based on the 2007 national census conducted by the Central Statistical Agency of Ethiopia (CSA), this town had a total population of 55,596, of whom 27,644 were male and 27,952 female. The majority of the inhabitants practiced Ethiopian Orthodox Christianity, with 96.72% reporting that as their religion, while 2.54% of the population said they were Muslim.

The 1994 national census reported a total population for Debre Tabor of 22,455 in 4,700 households, of whom 10,564 were male and 11,891 were female. The largest ethnic group reported in this town was the Amhara (98.93%); Amharic was spoken as a first language by 99.26%, while 92.62% of the population practiced Ethiopian Orthodox Christianity and 6.15% of the population said they were Muslim.

== People ==
- Aster Aweke
- Madingo Afework

== See also ==
- Tewodros II Secondary School
- Debre Tabor University
