= South Gondar Zone =

Zone in Amhara Region of Ethiopia

South Gondar ደቡብ ጎንደር
- Zone
- Flag

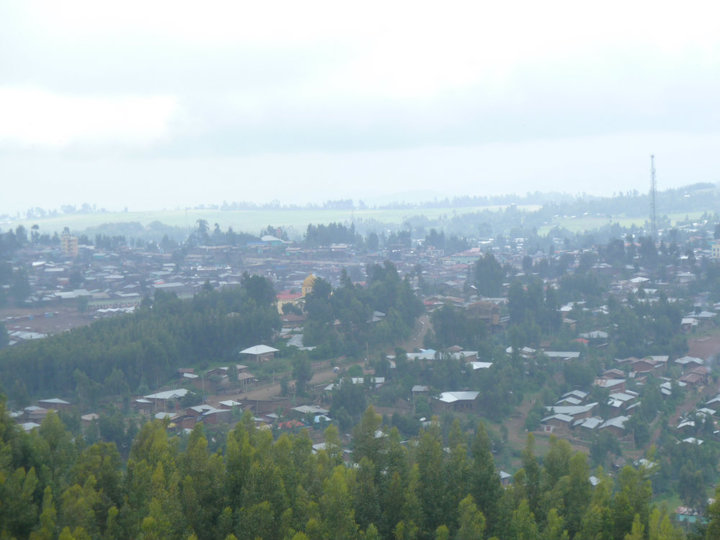
- Coordinates: 11.67°N 38°E
- Country: Ethiopia
- Region: Amhara
- Largest city: Debre Tabor

Area
  - Total: 14,095.19 km^{2} (5,442.18 sq mi)

Population (2007)
  - Total: 2,051,738
  - Density: 145.56/km^{2} (377.01/sq mi)

Map of the regions and zones of Ethiopia

South Gondar or Debub Gondar (Amharic: ደቡብ ጎንደር), is one of Zones in Amhara Region, Ethiopia. This zone is named for the city of Gondar, which was the capital of Ethiopia until the mid-19th century, and has often been used as a name for the local province. As of the 2007 census, it has over two million people.

South Gondar is bordered on the south by East Gojjam, on the southwest by West Gojjam and Bahir Dar, on the west by Lake Tana, on the north by North Gondar, on the northeast by Wag Hemra, on the east by North Wollo, and on the southeast by South Wollo; the Abbay River separates South Gondar from the two Gojjam Zones.

The highest point in South Gondar is Mount Guna (4,231 meters). Towns and cities in this zone include Addis Zemen, Debre Tabor and Wereta.

== Demographics ==
A 2012 estimate puts the population at 2,239,077. This gives a population density of 158.85 people per square kilometer (411.43 people per square mile), given its area of 14,095.19 square kilometers (5,442.18 square miles).

Based on the 2007 Census conducted by the Central Statistical Agency of Ethiopia (CSA), this Zone has a total population of 2,051,738, and an increase of 16% over the 1994 census, of whom 1,041,061 are men and 1,010,677 women. With an area of 14,095.19 square kilometers, South Gondar has a population density of 145.56 people per square kilometer (377.01 people per square mile); 195,619 or 9.53% are urban inhabitants. A total of 468,238 households were counted in this Zone, which results in an average of 4.38 persons to a household, and 453,658 housing units.

The 1994 national census reported a total population for this Zone of 1,768,732 in 393,311 households, of whom 904,796 were men and 863,936 women; 116,702 or 6.6% of its population were urban dwellers at the time.

The largest ethnic group reported in 1994 in South Gondar was the Amhara (99.89%); all other ethnic groups made up 0.11% of the population. Amharic is spoken as a first language by 99.92%; the remaining 0.08% spoke all other primary languages reported. 95.49% practiced Ethiopian Orthodox Christianity, and 4.36% of the population said they were Muslim. This was little changed by 2007, with Amhara making up 99.7% and all other ethnic groups made up 0.3% of the population. Amharic was spoken as a first language by 99.7%; the remaining 0.3% spoke all other primary languages reported. 96.14% practiced Ethiopian Orthodox Christianity, and 3.68% of the population said they were Muslim.

According to a May 24, 2004 World Bank memorandum, 4% of the inhabitants of South Gondar have access to electricity (which contributes to their energy poverty), this zone has a road density of 66.1 kilometers per 1000 square kilometers (compared to the national average of 30 kilometers), the average rural household has 1 hectare of land (compared to the national average of 1.01 hectare of land and an average of 0.75 for the Amhara Region) and the equivalent of 0.6 heads of livestock. 14% of the population is in non-farm related jobs, compared to the national average of 25% and a Regional average of 21%. 49% of all eligible children are enrolled in primary school, and 9% in secondary schools. 55% of the zone is exposed to malaria, and none to tsetse fly. The memorandum gave this zone a drought risk rating of 514.
