= Central Gondar Zone =

Zone in the Amhara Regional State

Central Gondar Zone ማዕከላዊ ጎንደር ዞን
- Zone
- Country: Ethiopia
- Region: Amhara
- Seat: Gondar

Government
  - Chief administrator: Aweke Asfere (Prosperity Party)

Area
  - Land: 20,843 km^{2} (8,048 sq mi)

Population
  - Total: 2,391,579
- Time zone: UTC+3 (East Africa Time)

The regions and zones of Ethiopia

Central Gondar Zone (Amharic: ማዕከላዊ ጎንደር ዞን) is a zonal administration in the Amhara Region of Ethiopia. Central Gondar Zone is one of 14 zones in Amhara Region covering 20,843 km². The zone shares its boundaries with Wag Hemra Zone to the east, West Gondar Zone to the west, Western Tigray Zone to the north, North Gondar Zone to the northeast, North Gojjam Zone to the south, South Gondar Zone to the southeast, and Agew Awi Zone to the southwest. Central Gondar Zone was formed following the division of the former North Gondar Zone into three separate administrative zones: Central Gondar, North Gondar and West Gondar.

== Woredas ==
Central Gondar Zone is formed from the union of three city administrations and four woredas. These administrative divisions are shown in the following table.

Woredas and City administrations in Central Gondar Zone Zone
Number	Woredas	Seat
1	Alefa	Shawra*
2	Central Armachiho	Masero Denb
3	Chilga	Ayikel*
4	Dembiya	Kolla Debba
5	Gondar Zuria	Maksegnit
6	Kinfaz Begela	Silarie
7	Lay Armachiho	Tikil Dingay
8	Mirab Belessa	Arbaya
9	Misraq Belessa	Gohala
10	Tach Armachiho	Sanja
11	Takusa	Delgi
12	Tegeda	Kirakir
13	Wegera	Amba Giorgis*
14	Gondar Town	Gondar

* City administrations, which are considered as Woreda for all administrative purposes.
