= Sanja (woreda) =

Woreda in Amhara, Ethiopia

Coordinates: 13°20′N 36°45′E

Sanja was one of the 105 woredas in the Amhara Region of Ethiopia. Part of the Semien Gondar Zone, Sanja was bordered on the south by Chilga, on the southwest by Metemma, on the west by Sudan, on the north by the Tigray Region, on the northeast by Debarq, on the east by Dabat, and on the southeast by Wegera and Lay Armachiho. Towns in Sanja included Abderafi and Kirakir. Sanja was divided for Mirab Armachiho, Tach Armachiho and Tegeda woredas.

== Demographics ==
Based on figures published by the Central Statistical Agency in 2005, this woreda has an estimated total population of 143,929, of whom 70,585 are men and 73,344 are women; 6,799 or 4.72% of its population are urban dwellers, which is less than the Zone average of 14.1%. With an estimated area of 8,332.84 square kilometers, Sanja has an estimated population density of 17.3 people per square kilometer, which is less than the Zone average of 60.23.

The 1994 national census reported a total population for this woreda of 105,751 in 20,428 households, of whom 54,405 were men and 51,346 women; 3,891 or 3.68% of its population were urban dwellers at the time. The two largest ethnic groups reported in Sanja were the Amhara (96.89%), and the Tigrayan (2.68%); all other ethnic groups made up 0.43% of the population. Amharic was spoken as a first language by 96.61%, and 3.21% spoke Tigrinya; the remaining 0.18% spoke all other primary languages reported. The majority of the inhabitants practiced Ethiopian Orthodox Christianity, with 98.66% embracing that faith, while 1.25% of the population said they were Muslim.
