= Susenyos II =

Emperor of Ethiopia in 1770

Emperor of Ethiopia
- Reign: August–December 1770
- Predecessor: Tekle Haymanot II
- Successor: Tekle Haymanot II
- Died: c. 1771
- Dynasty: House of Solomon
- Religion: Ethiopian Orthodox Tewahedo

Susenyos II (Amharic: ሱስንዮስ; died c. 1771) was Emperor of Ethiopia from August 1770 to December 1770. His name at birth was Wolde Giyorgis; he was the son of a noble woman who had lost her fortune and made her living by carrying jars of water, while it was rumored that he was the illegitimate son of the deceased ruler Iyasu II. The Scottish traveller James Bruce, who was living in the capital city of Gondar at the time, described him as "a drunkard, a ruffian, and a profligate".

== Reign ==
On 5 June 1770, Ras Mikael Sehul was forced to evacuate the city with Emperor Tekle Haymanot; they marched to Tigray to suppress several revolts there. Ras Goshu and Wand Bewossen entered Gondar 10 June, where they attempted to convince Empress Mentewab to join them but failed. After waiting several days for Fasil to fulfill his promise to join them from his headquarters at Bure in Gojjam, on the 27th they left Gondar.

By the beginning of August, the principal inhabitants of Gondar held a council to select a new Emperor, and Ras Sanuda's nomination of Susenyos (born Wolde Giyorgis), then 24 years old, was accepted. He was the son of a noble woman who had lost her fortune and made her living by carrying jars of water, while it was rumored that he was the illegitimate son of the deceased ruler Iyasu II. Ostensibly, Susenyos was to gather an army and march against Ras Mikael, but the only noble who still who could provide enough soldiers was Fasil, who continued to temporalize over marching to Gondar until 2 November, when he arrived with 400 horse and 600 foot. At his arrival Susenyos rashly granted him a third of Ethiopia, only to find that in doing so he weakened his most loyal supporter, Ras Sanuda. This led to further disagreements between the pretender and Fasil, and despite Abuna Yosab III's attempts to make a peace between them, by 26 November Fasil declared his allegiance for Emperor Tekle Haymanot and left Gondar for Dengel Ber.

The Scottish traveller James Bruce, who was living in the capital city of Gondar at the time, described him as "a drunkard, a ruffian, and a profligate". Bruce had only one encounter with this ephemeral ruler. On the night of 5 December, in a drunken fit, Susenyos with some confederates left the Imperial palace and plundered several private homes, including the house Bruce was living in at the time. "Every thing that could be carried away was stolen or broken; among which was a reflecting telescope, a barometer, and thermometer; a great many papers and sketches of drawings, [were] first torn then burnt". The next day Bruce was summoned to the palace where he presented himself before Susenyos, who

was sitting, his eyes half closed, red as scarlet with last night's debauch; he was apparently at that moment much in liquor; his mouth full of tobacco, squirting his spittle out of his mouth to a very great distance; with this he had so covered the floor that it was with great difficulty I could choose a clean place to kneel, and make my obeisance.

— James Bruce,

J.M. Reid, in his biography, pointedly notes the "sickening contrast" between the chamber when Bruce waited on Emperor Tekle Haymanot and the presence audience. The audience with Susenyos was a trying experience for Bruce. Susenyos complained that the Scotsman had paid him no attention and demanded gifts from Bruce. Bruce reports that he made a bold reply, at which point "an old man of noble appearance" came forward, whom Bruce identified as Ras Sanuda, and lectured Susenyos on his behavior, reminding him Bruce "is a friend, not only to the king but to us all: the whole people love him." Susenyos' only response to his advisor was to joke, "You are very angry to-day, Baba."

== Deposition ==
Susenyos' time on the throne was all but over on 15 December, when Ras Mikael forded the Tekezé and swiftly closed on the capital; Ras Sanuda declared for Mikael Sehul. Accordingly, Susenyos fled Gondar with the Empress Mentewab; first he sought refuge with Abuna Yosab in Emfraz only to be turned away, then after sending his valuables to safety on Dek Island in Lake Tana proceeded to Qwara. Once there, writes Bruce, "Those who made Socinios a king never made him a friend."

It was here suggested, that his presence would infallibly occasion a pursuit which might endanger the queen, her country, and all her friends. Upon this it was resolved to abandon the unworthy Socinios to the soldiers, who stript him naked, giving him only a rag to cover him, and a good horse, and with these they dismissed him to seek his fortune.

— James Bruce,

Ras Mikael Sehul entered the capital city on 23 December, restored Tekle Haymanot, and began a purge of his enemies whom he found in the city, beginning with the crucifixion of Abba Salama and Germa Tseyon, the brother of Waragna.

After the three battles of Sarbakusa the following year, Susenyos fell into the hands of Wand Bewossen, who (before leaving Gondar with Ras Mikael Sehul as his prisoner) sent the deposed pretender in chains to Emperor Tekle Haymanot; the Emperor made him a slave in the palace kitchen where, after a short time, Susenyos was caught stealing and hanged.

Regnal titles
Preceded by Tekle Haymanot II	Emperor of Ethiopia; 1770	Succeeded by Tekle Haymanot II
