= Belessa =

District of Ethiopia

Coordinates: 12°15′N 37°45′E

Belessa was one of the 105 woredas in the Amhara Region of Ethiopia. It was named after the former province Belessa, which lay in the same area. Part of the Semien Gondar Zone, Belessa was bordered on the south by the Debub Gondar Zone, on the west by Gondar Zuria, on the northwest by Wegera, on the northeast by Jan Amora, and on the east by the Wag Hemra Zone. Towns in Belessa included Arbaya and Hamusit. Belessa was separated for Mirab Belessa and Misraq Belessa woredas.

Rivers in Belessa include the Balagas. A notable landmark is Mount Wehni, where the former royal prison of the heirs to the throne of the Emperor of Ethiopia was located. Due to its inaccessibility and the lack of the most basic infrastructure, in 1999 the Regional government classified Belessa as one of its 47 drought prone and food insecure woredas. A 2005 survey of the eastern part of this woreda described it as a highly degraded and seriously drought-affected mountainous area, with an altitude that varied between 1,200 and 1,800 meters above sea level.

The member of parliament from Belessa is the former President of the Amhara Region, and one time Minister of Agriculture and Rural Development, Addisu Legesse.

== Demographics ==
Based on figures published by the Central Statistical Agency in 2005, this woreda has an estimated total population of 190,968, of whom 93,207 are men and 97,761 are women; 10,121 or 5.30% of its population are urban dwellers, which is less than the Zone average of 14.1%. With an estimated area of 2,560.63 square kilometers, Belessa has an estimated population density of 74.6 people per square kilometer, which is greater than the Zone average of 60.23.

The 1994 national census reported a total population for this woreda of 140,214 in 28,046 households, of whom 72,535 were men and 67,679 women; 5,857 or 4.18% of its population were urban dwellers at the time. The largest ethnic group reported in Belessa was the Amhara (99.11%); all other ethnic groups made up 0.89% of the population. Amharic was spoken as a first language by 99.31%; the remaining 0.69% spoke all other primary languages reported. 97.25% practiced Ethiopian Orthodox Christianity, and 2.64% of the population said they were Muslim.
