= Gondar Zuria =

District in Amhara Region, Ethiopia

Coordinates: 12°40′N 37°20′E

Gondar Zuria ጎንደር ዙሪያ
- Woreda
- Interactive map of Gondar Zuria
- Zone: Semien Gondar
- Region: Amhara Region

Area
  - Total: 1,108.53 km^{2} (428.01 sq mi)

Population (2012 est.)
  - Total: 208,889
  - Density: 188.44/km^{2} (488.05/sq mi)

Gondar Zuria (Amharic: ጎንደር ዙሪያ, lit. "Greater Gondar Area") is a woreda in Amhara Region, Ethiopia. Part of the Semien Gondar Zone, Gondar Zuria is bordered on the south by the Debub Gondar Zone, on the southwest by Lake Tana, on the west by Dembiya, on the north by Lay Armachiho, on the northeast by Wegera, and on the southeast by Mirab Belessa. Towns in Gondar Zuria include Azazo, Degoma, Emfraz, Maksenit and Teda. The city and woreda of Gondar is surrounded by Gondar Zuria in the northern part of this woreda.

Notable landmarks in this woreda include Guzara Castle, a former Imperial residence said to have been built by Emperor Sarsa Dengel.

In May 1771, the three battles of Sarbakusa were fought south of Teda within the modern borders of this woreda between Ras Mikael Sehul and the triumvirate of Fasil, Goshu of Amhara, and Wand Bewossen of Begemder. Ras Mikael was defeated, and his influence over the Emperors at Gondar came to an end.

== Demographics ==
A 2012 estimate puts the population at 208,889. This gives a population density of 188.44 people per square kilometer (488.05 people per square mile), given its area of 1,108.53 square kilometers (428.01 square miles), significantly higher than the North Gondar Zone average of 70.19 people per square kilometer (181.80 people per square mile).

Based on the 2007 national census conducted by the Central Statistical Agency of Ethiopia (CSA), the woreda had a total population of 191,394, a decrease of 0.49% from the 1994 census, of whom 97,388 were men and 94,006 women; 18,377 or 9.60% were urban inhabitants. With an area of 1,108.53 square kilometers, Gondar Zuriya had a population density of 172.66 people per square kilometer (447.17 people per square mile), which is significantly greater than the Zone average of 63.76 people per square kilometer (165.15 people per square mile). A total of 42,753 households were counted in this woreda, resulting in an average of 4.48 persons to a household, and 41,182 housing units. The 1994 national census reported a total population for this woreda of 192,337 in 35,547 households, of whom 98,075 were men and 94,262 women; 15,703 or 8.16% of its population were urban dwellers at the time.

In 1994 the two largest ethnic groups reported in Gondar Zuria were the Amhara (91.23%), and the Qemant (8.26%); all other ethnic groups made up 0.51% of the population. A notable minority in this woreda are the Weyto, who are thought to be the earliest surviving ethnic group to settle around Lake Tana; they number 295 or 0.15% of the population. Amharic was spoken as a first language by 99.78%; the remaining 0.22% spoke all other primary languages reported. 92.45% practiced Ethiopian Orthodox Christianity, and 7.37% of the population said they were Muslim. This had shifted by 2007, with 94.8% reporting Ethiopian Orthodox Christianity as their religion, while 5.2% of the population said they were Muslim.
