= Dabat =

Town in Amhara Region, Ethiopia

Dabat ዳባት
- Town
- Location within Ethiopia Location within the Horn of Africa Location within Africa
- Coordinates: 12°59′03″N 37°45′54″E
- Country: Ethiopia
- Region: Amhara
- Zone: Semien Gondar
- Woreda: Dabat
- Elevation: 2,610 m (8,560 ft)

Population (2007)
  - Total: 12,574
- Time zone: UTC+3 (EAT)

Dabat (Amharic: ዳባት) is a town in northern Ethiopia, located about 50 kilometers north of Gondar in the Semien Mountains along the Gondar-Debarq highway Dabat it is in the Semien Gondar Zone of the Amhara Region, and is one of two towns in Dabat woreda.

== History ==
Little is known about how the town was founded. In the late period of emperor Menelik II's reign the town grew in significance due to its telephone station.

In September 1930, slave trade was banned after a proclamation by its governor, dejazmach Ayalew Birru was published.

=== War and fascist occupation 1935-1941 ===
Reportedly Dabat had a landing field for air travel, and was utilized before and during the conflict with fascist Italy. On 4 December 1935, 12 Italian planes dropped over 150 bombs and struck Ras Imru Haile Selassie's army near the landing field. After an initial battlefield victory, dejazmach Ayalew was ordered to send Italian prisoners under his custody to Addis Abeba by air. The fascists bombed Dabat every two days for a period during the conflict. Dejazmach Ayalew's fortified residence and the town's church (Gebriel) were completely destroyed and burnt by bombs.

On 2 April 1936, Dabat fell under fascist occupation. The Italians established a large farm, a granary, a small food processing plant, and an agricultural research centre in Dabat. They also opened a post office on 1 December (or 29 November) 1937.

In April 1941, the East African campaign was in full swing, when Major Basil Ringrose took Dabat, and effectively cut off the large Italian garrison at Uolchefit from Gondar. During the final confrontation with the Italians in October–November 1941 the allies had a base hospital in Dabat.

=== Post liberation to 2000 ===
Dabat was the capital of the Wogera awraja between 1950 and 1980. By 1967 there were telephones for the governor, police and public health center.

On 21 April 1977, Ethiopian Democratic Union claimed they had captured 300 heavily armed Ethiopian Government troops of the Flame Division near Dabat.

On 1 January 1989, the TPLF launched an offensive against the 603rd Corps Army of the Derg on 1st of, and having destroyed government forces stationed at Dabat they controlled the town of Dabat on 3 January.

=== 21st century ===
In the national elections of 15 May 2005 the Dabat constituency had 50 polling stations and 54,743 registered voters of whom 75% cast their votes. Leading party was the Coalition for Unity and Democracy with 16,690 votes with candidate Major Bayeh Ayalew Reda, defeating the ruling EPRDF with 13,745 votes. The United Ethiopian Democratic Forces party received 1,111 votes. The remaining 9,587 votes are not explained.

== Geography ==
Dabat consist of three settlements on three high points at an elevation of 2610 meters. The surrounding area is very fertile and known for its wheat and barley production. The road up north continues to climb up to about 2,865 metres, and when travelling southwards past Dabat, the road begins the final descent to Gondar. On a clear day you can see the blue waters of Lake Tana from this point.

== Culture ==
Dabat is famous for its fine breed of horses, and during the Meskel holiday, the town attracts visitors from the surrounding areas to see the horse race.

The town has a church dedicated to Saint George.

== Health care ==
There is a state run health center in Dabat.

== Demographics ==
According to the 2007 national census, this town has a total population of 12,574 of whom 5,662 are men and 6,912 are women. The 1994 census reported Dabat had a total population of 8,782 of whom 3,737 were men and 5,045 were women.
