= Dembiya (woreda) =

District in Amhara Region, Ethiopia

Coordinates: 12°40′N 37°10′E

Dembiya ደምቢያ
- Woreda
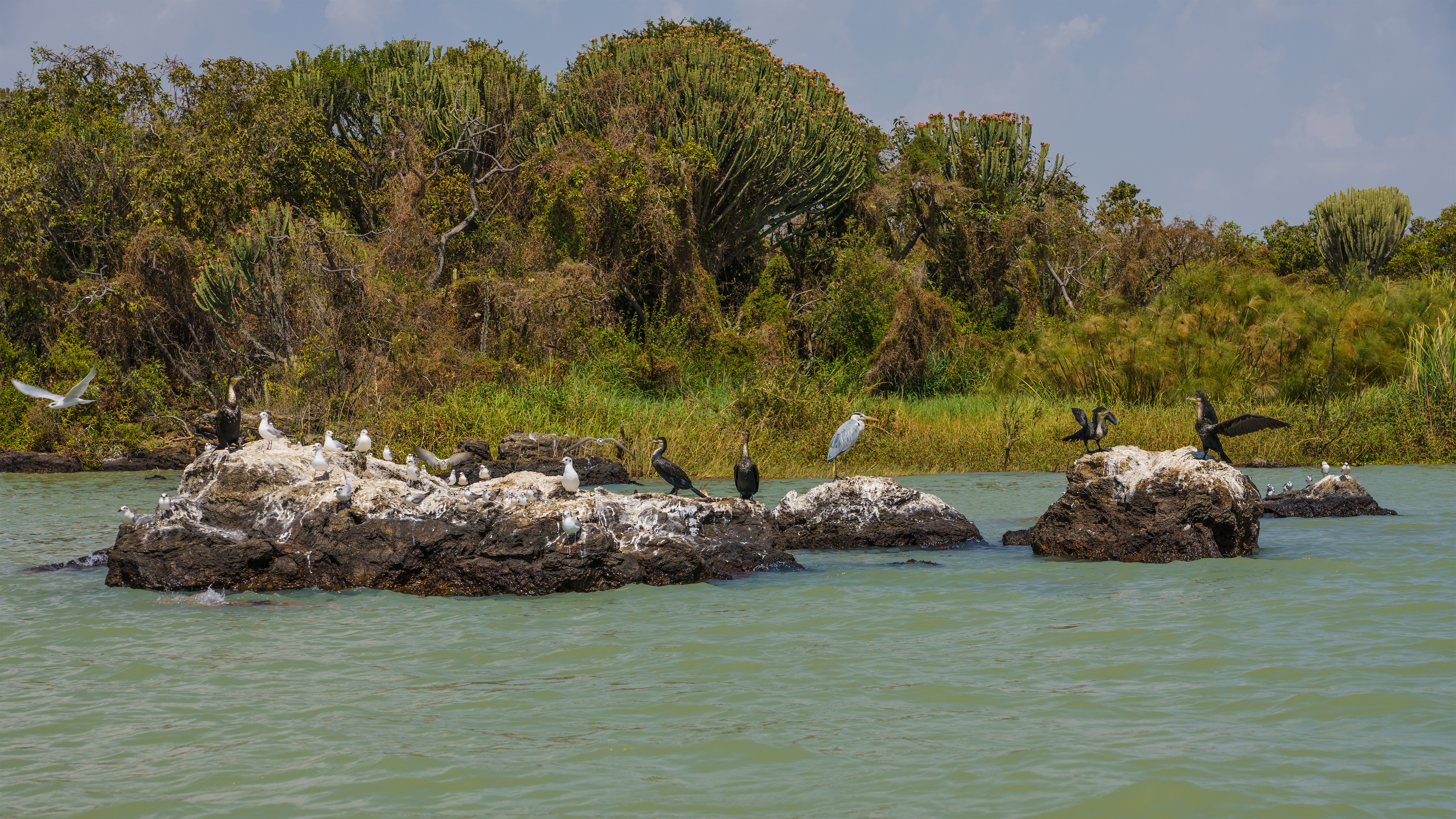

- Flag
- Interactive map of Dembiya
- Zone: Central Gondar
- Region: Amhara

Area
  - Total: 1,261.96 km^{2} (487.25 sq mi)

Population (2012 est.)
  - Total: 295,423
  - Density: 234.10/km^{2} (606.31/sq mi)

Dembiya (Amharic: ደምቢያ) is a woreda in Amhara Region, Ethiopia. It is named for the former province of Dembiya, which was located roughly in the same location. Part of the Semien, Dembiya is bordered on the south by Lake Tana, on the southwest by Takusa, on the west by Chilga, on the north by Lay Armachiho, and on the east by Gondar Zuria. Towns in Dembiya include Aymiba, Chuahit, Gorgora and Koladiba.

Rivers within this woreda include the Lesser Angereb and Derma, which flow south into Lake Tana, and the Atbarah. A survey of the land in this woreda shows that 64% is arable or cultivable and another 25% under irrigation, 6% pasture, 4% forest or shrubland, and the remaining 1% is considered degraded or other. 287 square kilometers adjacent to Lake Tana is subject to regular and extensive flooding.

== Local History ==
The location of the Battle of Gur Amba, where Ras Kassa (the later Emperor Tewodros II) defeated Dejazmach Goshu Zewde 27 November 1852, lies within the modern boundaries of this woreda.

The woreda of Dembiya was heavily affected by the flash floods in Ethiopia which started 6 September and receded by 26 September 2006. The heavy rain caused Lake Tana to overflow its banks, making thousands of people homeless. "Thousands of heads of cattle, whole silos of grain, and significant tracts of grazing and farmland have been washed away," according to IRIN.

== Demographics ==
A 2012 estimate puts the population at 295,423. This gives a population density of 234.10 people per square kilometer (606.31 people per square mile), given its area of 1261.96 square kilometers (487.25 square miles), very significantly higher than the North Gondar Zone average of 70.19 people per square kilometer (181.80 people per square mile).

Based on the 2007 national census conducted by the Central Statistical Agency of Ethiopia (CSA), this woreda has a total population of 271,053, an increase of 24.33% over the 1994 census, of whom 138,110 are men and 132,943 women; 23,354 or 8.62% are urban inhabitants. With an area of 1,261.96 square kilometers, Dembiya has a population density of 214.79 (556.29 people per square mile), which is greater than the Zone average of 63.76 people per square kilometer (165.15 people per square mile). A total of 59,382 households were counted in this woreda, resulting in an average of 4.56 persons to a household, and 57,668 housing units.

The majority of the inhabitants practiced Ethiopian Orthodox Christianity, with 98.3% reporting that as their religion, while 1.7% of the population said they were Muslim.

The 1994 national census reported a total population for this woreda of 218,014 in 40,680 households, of whom 111,329 were men and 106,685 women; 17,667 or 8.1% of its population were urban dwellers at the time. The two largest ethnic groups reported in Dembiya were the Amhara (97.35%), and the Qemant (2.15%); all other ethnic groups made up 0.5% of the population. A notable minority in this woreda are the Weyto, who are thought to be the earliest surviving ethnic group to settle around Lake Tana; they number 480 or 0.22% of the population. Amharic was spoken as a first language by 99.81%; the remaining 0.19% spoke all other primary languages reported. 97.98% practiced Ethiopian Orthodox Christianity, and 1.95% of the population said they were Muslim.
