= Addi Arkay =

Coordinates: 13°40′N 38°00′E

Adarkay አዲ አርቃይ
- Woreda
- Adi Arkay
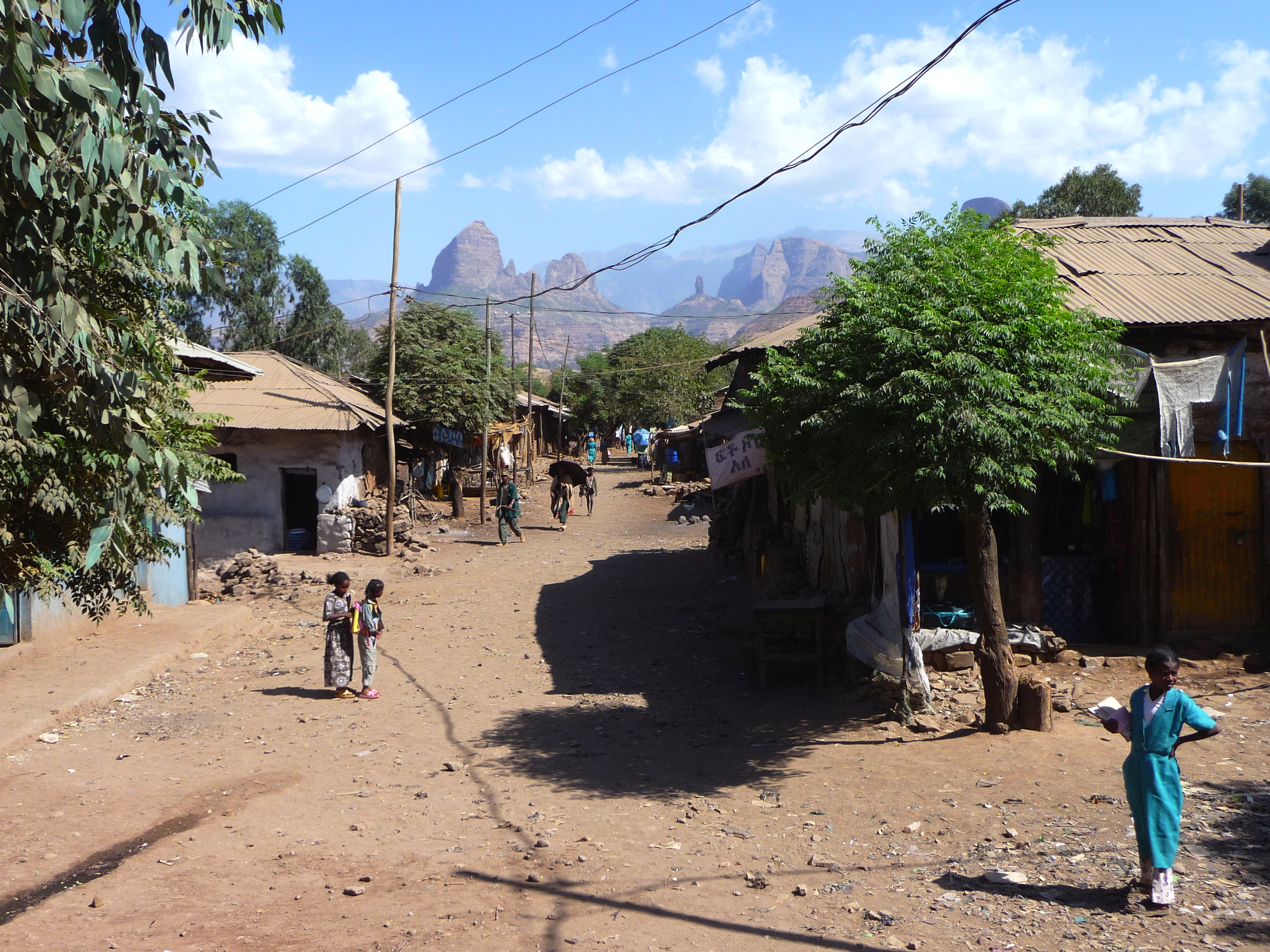
- A street in Adi Arkay

- Flag
- Interactive map of Adarkay
- Zone: Semien Gondar
- Region: Amhara Region

Area
  - Total: 1,685.16 km^{2} (650.64 sq mi)

Population (2012 est.)
  - Total: 102,545
  - Density: 60.8518/km^{2} (157.605/sq mi)

Addi Arkay (Amharic: አዲ አርቃይ ) is one of the woredas in the Amhara Region of Ethiopia. Located at the northeastern point of the Semien Gondar Zone, Addi Arkay is bordered on the south by Jan Amora, on the southwest by Debarq, on the north by the Tigray Region, and on the east by Telemt. Towns in Adarkay woreda include Addi Arkay and Zarima. Tselemt woreda was separated from Addi Arkay.

This woreda is situated on the northern slopes of the Semien Mountains. Rivers include the Zarima, a tributary of the Tekezé. Due to its inaccessibility and the lack of the most basic infrastructure, in 1999 the Regional government classified Addi Arkai as one of its 47 drought prone and food insecure woredas.

== Demographics ==
A 2012 estimate puts the population at 102,545. This gives a population density of 60.85 people per square kilometer (157.80 people per square mile), given its area of 1685.16 square kilometers (650.64 square miles), lower than the North Gondar Zone average of 70.19 people per square kilometer (181.80 people per square mile).

Based on the 2007 national census conducted by the Central Statistical Agency of Ethiopia (CSA), this woreda has a total population of 93,763, a decrease of 12.36% from the 1994 census, of whom 47,907 are men and 45,856 women; 10,391 or 11.08% are urban inhabitants. With an area of 1,685.16 square kilometers, Addi Arkay has a population density of 55.64, which is less than the Zone average of 63.76 people per square kilometer (144.11 people per square mile). A total of 20,203 households were counted in this woreda, resulting in an average of 4.64 persons to a household, and 19,229 housing units.

The 1994 national census reported a total population for this woreda of 106,983 in 21,175 households, of whom 54,196 were men and 52,787 women; 7,044 or 6.58% of its population were urban dwellers at the time.

The two largest ethnic groups reported in 1994 in Addi Arkay were the Amhara (97.63%), and the Tigrayan (2.1%); all other ethnic groups made up 0.27% of the population. Amharic was spoken as a first language by 98.02%, and 1.8% spoke Tigrinya; the remaining 0.18% spoke all other primary languages reported. The majority of the inhabitants practiced Ethiopian Orthodox Christianity, with 93.8% reporting that as their religion, while 5.94% of the population said they were Muslim. By 2007 this had changed somewhat, with 89.5% reporting that as their religion, while 10.5% of the population said they were Muslim.

== Agriculture ==
A sample enumeration performed by the CSA in 2001 interviewed 24,909 farmers in this woreda, who held an average of 1.33 hectares of land. Of the 18.778 square kilometers of private land surveyed, 94% was under cultivation, 0.6% pasture, 3.5% was fallow, and the remaining 1.9% was devoted to other uses. For the land under cultivation in this woreda, 75.4% was planted in cereals like teff, 7% in pulses, 11.1% in oilseeds, 0.2% in perennial crops like gesho, and 6.3% all other crops. 80.8% of the farmers both raised crops and livestock, while 17% only grew crops and 2.2% only raised livestock.
