= Weyto =

Weyto or Weyt'o can refer to

- hunter-gatherers in Ethiopia, including the Weyto caste of Lake Tana
- Weyto language, a language formerly spoken by the Lake Tana Weyto
- Weito River, a river in Ethiopia
