= Qwara (woreda) =

District in Amhara Region, Ethiopia

Qwara ቋራ
- Woreda
- Flag

- Location of Qwara within Ethiopia
- Coordinates: 12°30′N 35°45′E
- Zone: Semien Gondar
- Region: Amhara

Area
  - Total: 7,707.19 km^{2} (2,975.76 sq mi)

Population (2012 est.)
  - Total: 159,091
  - Density: 20.64/km^{2} (53.46/sq mi)

Qwara (Amharic: ቋራ) is one of the woredas in the Amhara Region of Ethiopia. Qwara is named after the former province of Qwara, which was in the same area. Located at the westernmost point of the Semien Gondar Zone, Qwara is bordered on the south by the Benishangul-Gumuz Region, on the west by Sudan, on the north by Metemma, on the east by Takusa and Alefa, and on the southeast by Agew Awi Zone; part of its boundary with the Benishangul-Gumaz Region is defined by the Dinder River. The administrative center of this woreda is Gelegu; other settlements include Tewodros Ketema.

== History ==
After the Ethiopian People's Revolutionary Party (EPRP) was defeated for control of northern Ethiopia, one wing of the EPRP moved to Qwara where it continued to fight against both the Derg and the TPLF.

Qwara was selected by the Ministry of Agriculture and Rural Development in 2003 as an area for voluntary resettlement for farmers from overpopulated areas. Along with Metema, the other woreda selected in Amhara that year, that year this woreda became the home for a total of 13,742 heads of households and 12,337 total family members. Qwara was selected again in the fourth round of this resettlement program in 2006 and, along with Lay Armachiho and Dangila in the Amhara Region, and Tsegede in the Tigrai Region, became the new homes of 8,671 families. This was reportedly accompanied with almost 68 million Birr in infrastructure development.

== Demographics ==
A 2012 estimate puts the population at 159,091. This gives a population density of 20.64 people per square kilometer (53.46 people per square mile), given its area of 7,707.10 square kilometers (2,975.76 square miles), less than one third the North Gondar Zone average of 70.19 people per square kilometer (181.80 people per square mile).

Based on the 2007 national census conducted by the Central Statistical Agency of Ethiopia (CSA), this woreda has a total population of 94,106, an increase of 164.34% over the 1994 census, of whom 50,021 are men and 44,085 women; 4,731 or 5.03% are urban inhabitants. With an area of 7,707.19 square kilometers, Qwara has a population density of 12.21 people per square kilometer (31.62 people per square mile), which is less than one fifth the Zone average of 63.76 people per square kilometer (165.15 people per square mile). A total of 22,565 households were counted in this woreda, resulting in an average of 4.17 persons to a household, and 21,345 housing units. The 1994 national census reported a total population for this woreda of 35,600, of whom 18,553 were men and 17,047 women; 289 or 0.81% of its population were urban dwellers at the time.

In 1994 the four largest ethnic groups reported in Qwara were the Amhara (81.35%), the Agaw Awi (10%), the Gumuz (6.69%), and the Qemant (0.71%); all other ethnic groups made up 1.25% of the population. Amharic was spoken as a first language by 82.31%, 9.98% Gumuz, and 6.7% spoke Awngi; the remaining 1.01% spoke all other primary languages reported. The majority of the inhabitants practiced Ethiopian Orthodox Christianity, with 92.32% reporting that as their religion, while 7.58% of the population said they were Muslim. This had shifted a little by 2007, with 93.2% reporting Ethiopian Orthodox Christianity as their religion, while 6.7% of the population said they were Muslim.
