= Jan Amora =

District in Amhara Region, Ethiopia

Jan Amora ጃን አሞራ
- Woreda
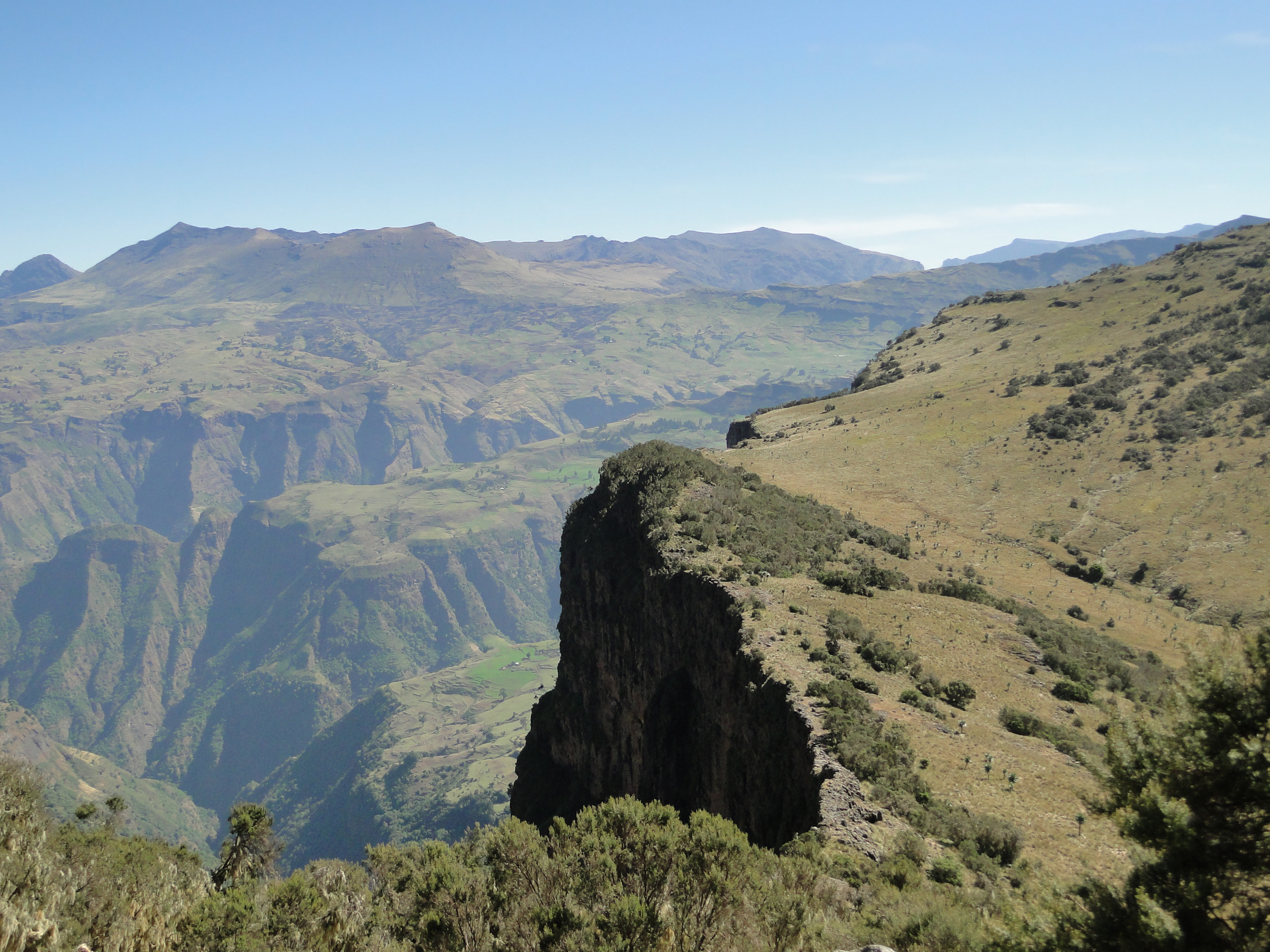

- Location in Ethiopia
- Coordinates: 12°59′N 38°07′E
- Country: Ethiopia
- Region: Amhara
- Zone: North Gondar

Area
  - Total: 1,737.24 km^{2} (670.75 sq mi)
- Elevation: 2,900 m (9,500 ft)

Population (2012)
  - Total: 181,412 (est)
  - Density: 104.43/km^{2} (270.46/sq mi)
- Time zone: UTC+3 (EAT)

Jan Amora (Amharic: ጃን አሞራ jān āmōrā, meaning "Royal eagle") is one of the woredas in the Amhara Region of Ethiopia. Part of the Semien Gondar Zone, Jan Amora is bordered on the south by Misraq Belessa, on the southwest by Wegera, on the west by Debarq, on the north by Addi Arkay and Tselemt, on the east by Beyeda, and on the southeast by Wag Hemra Zone. The administrative center of Jan Amora is Mekane Berhan.

== Overview ==
The old sub-province and modern woreda were named after one of the medieval Ethiopian Empire's best fighting regiments. An early mention of Jan Amora was when Baeda Maryam I, who was campaigning against the now extinct Dobe'a in modern Afar region, had called upon them after his regular troops were defeated, with them being eager to participate in the campaign. The place name Jan Amora appears in the Futuh al-Habasha and in an 18th-century legal text, but it is unclear if they refer to the place that became this woreda; Richard Pankhurst believes that this "Jan Amora" was located south of Tekezze river. The military formation known as "Jan Amora" was later under the command of Emperor Lebna Dengel's uncle Azaj Fanoel.

The Jan Amora region today covers the Semien Mountains and a portion of their southern slopes, which makes access to this woreda difficult. A road linking Jan Amora and Debarq, 60 kilometers in length, was under construction in May 1994. Due to its inaccessibility and the lack of the most basic infrastructure, in 1999 the Regional government classified Addi Arkay as one of its 47 drought-prone and food-insecure woredas. To alleviate this situation, the Amhara Credit and Saving Institution SC, a micro-finance institution, opened an office in the woreda in the late 1990s. The Semien Mountains cover most of the northern part of this woreda, as well as the Semien Mountains National Park.

== Demographics ==
A 2012 estimate puts the population at 181,412. This gives a population density of 104.43 people per square kilometer (270.46 people per square mile), given its area of 1137.24 square kilometers (670.75 square miles), lower than the North Gondar Zone average of 70.19 people per square kilometer (181.80 people per square mile).

Based on the 2007 national census conducted by the Central Statistical Agency of Ethiopia (CSA), this woreda has a total population of 167,757, an increase of 33.65% over the 1994 census, of whom 84,456 are men and 83,301 women; 5,057 or 3.01% are urban inhabitants. With an area of 1,737.24 square kilometers, Jan Amora has a population density of 96.57 people per square kilometer (250.10 people per square mile), which is greater than the Zone average of 63.76 people per square kilometer (165.15 people per square mile). A total of 36,361 households were counted in this woreda, resulting in an average of 4.61 persons to a household, and 35,389 housing units. The 1994 national census reported a total population for this woreda of 125,516 in 26,918 households, of whom 63,335 were men and 62,181 women; 1,584 or 1.26% of its population were urban dwellers at the time.

In 2994 he largest ethnic group reported in Jan Amora was the Amhara (99.8%), and Amharic was spoken as a first language by 99.76%. The majority of the inhabitants practiced Ethiopian Orthodox Christianity, with 93.81% reporting that as their religion, while 6.1% of the population said they were Muslim. This had shifted a little by 2007, with 94.8% reporting that as their religion, while 5.2% of the population said they were Muslim.

== Tourism ==
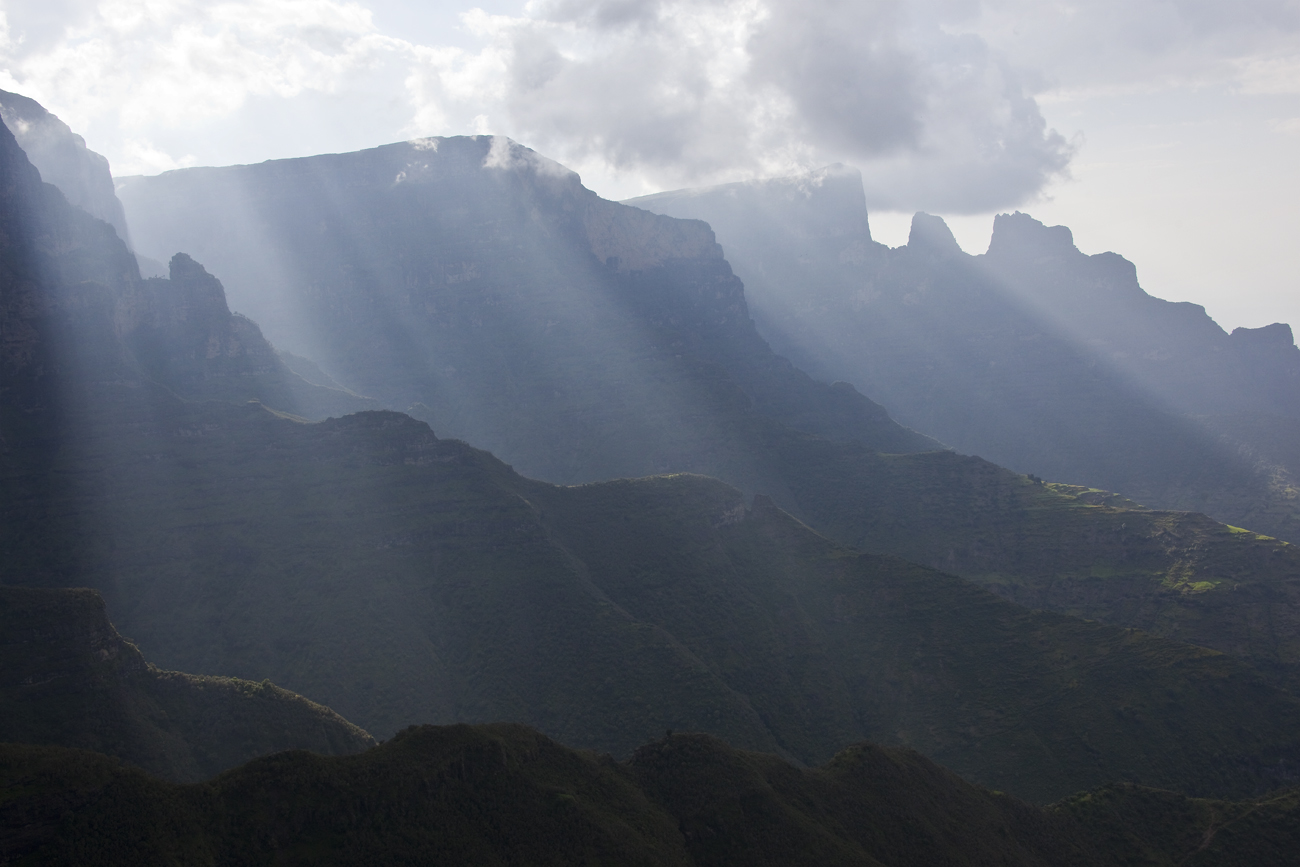
Semien Mountains

Simien Mountains National Park is one of the national parks of Ethiopia. Located Jan Amora and Debarq Semien (North) Gondar Zone of the Amhara Region, its territory covers the Simien Mountains and includes Ras Dashan, the highest point in Ethiopia. It is home to a number of endangered species, including the Ethiopian wolf and the walia ibex, a wild goat found nowhere else in the world. The gelada baboon and the caracal, a medium sized wild cat, also occur within the Simien Mountains Although the word Semien means "north" in Amharic, according to Richard Pankhurst the ancestral form of the word actually meant "south" in Ge'ez, because the mountains lay to the south of Aksum, which was at the time the center of Ethiopian civilization. But as over the following centuries the center of Ethiopian civilization itself moved to the south, these mountains came to be thought of as lying to the north, and the meaning of the word likewise changed.

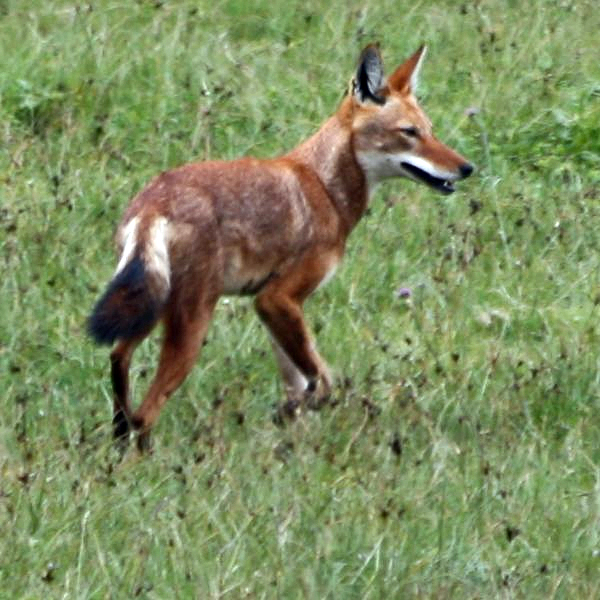

The Semiens are remarkable as being one of the few spots in Africa where snow regularly falls. First mentioned in the Monumentum Adulitanum of the 4th century AD (which described them as "inaccessible mountains covered with snow" and where soldiers walked up to their knees in snow), the presence of snow was undeniably witnessed by the 17th century Jesuit priest Jerónimo Lobo. Although the later traveler James Bruce claims that he had never witnessed snow in the Semien Mountains, the 19th century explorer Henry Salt not only recorded that he saw snow there (on 9 April 1814), but explained the reason for Bruce's failure to see snow in these mountains – Bruce had ventured no further than the foothills into the Semiens.

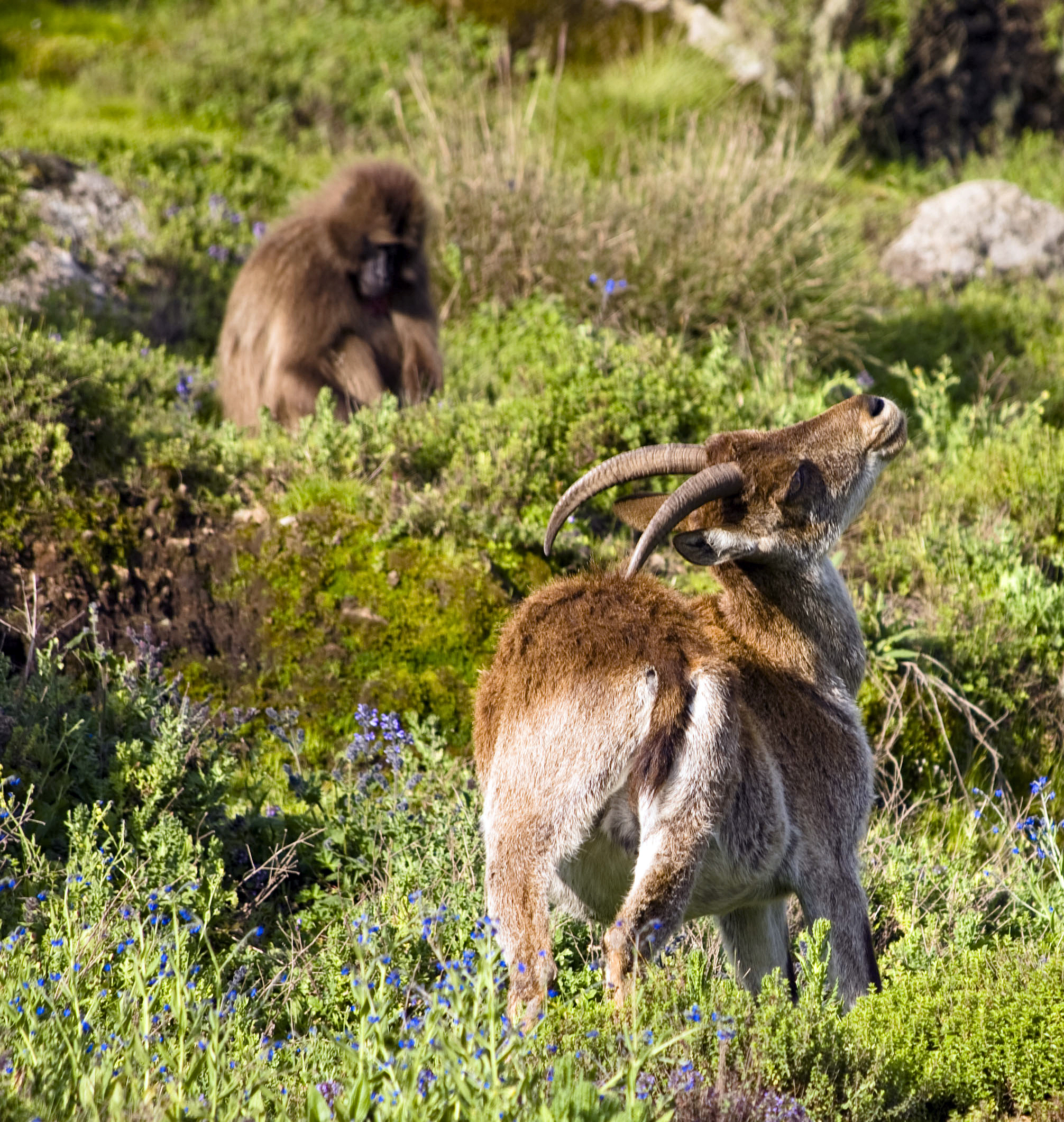
Middle

The Walia ibex is another animal that is native to Jan Amora. The ibex is from the goat family, and currently there are 1200 in Jan Amora. This endangered species is found in only semien Mountains Debark and Jan Amora. Jan Amora also is home to two of some of the most endangered animals the Simien jackal and the Ethiopian wolf. The population of these recently animals is increasing to about 10% every year

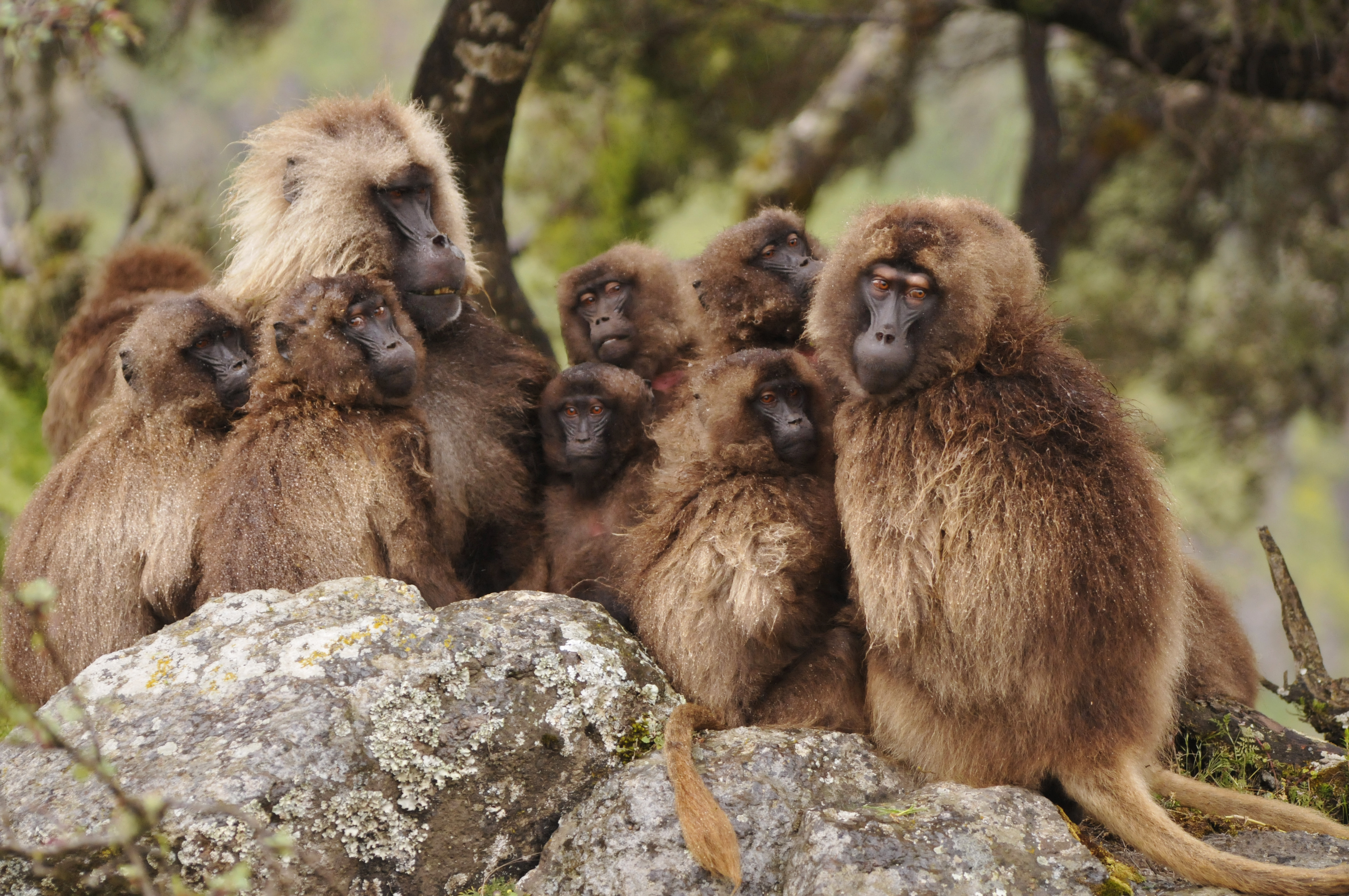
A gelada reproductive unit

Jan Amora is also the place for Ethiopian monkey Gelada with large populations in the Semien Mountains. The Gelada live with other large group Monkeys. These Gelada only found in Ethiopia not other else. These Gelada mainly eat grass but the Male gelada eat other animals' meat. When both blades and seeds are available, geladas prefer the seeds. They also eat flowers, rhizomes and roots when available. At night, they sleep on the ledges of cliffs. At sunrise, they leave the cliffs and travel to the tops of the plateaus to feed and socialize. When morning ends, social activities tend to wane and the geladas primarily focus on foraging. They will travel during this time, as well. When evening arrives, geladas exhibit more social activities before descending to the cliffs to sleep.Over 474,000 tourists visited Semien Mountains during the first nine months of the current Ethiopian fiscal year, from Britain, Japan, the Netherlands, Spain and Italy and among others country. Ethiopia generates $252 million revenue from tourism in Semien Mountains in 2006 to 2011.

== Notable people from Jan Amora ==
- Abuna Salama III
- Dejazmach Wube Haile Maryam
