= Tach Armachiho =

Tach Armachiho ታች አርማጭሆ
- Woreda
- Flag
- Zone: Semien Gondar
- Region: Amhara Region

Area
  - Total: 2,710.41 km^{2} (1,046.50 sq mi)

Population (2012 est.)
  - Total: 97,824
  - Density: 36.09/km^{2} (93.48/sq mi)

Tach Armachiho (Amharic: ታች አርማጭሆ) is one of the woredas in the Amhara Region of Ethiopia. This woreda is named after "Armachiho", a province in northwestern Ethiopia along the border with Sudan and south of the Tekezé River. Part of the Central Gondar Zone, Tach Armachiho is bordered on the south by Lay Armachiho and Chilga, on the southwest by Metemma, on the west by Mirab Armachiho, on the north by the Tegeda, on the east by Dabat, and on the southeast by Wegera. Sanja town is the administrative center of Tach Armachiho Woreda.

== Demographics ==
A 2012 estimate puts the population at 97,824. This gives a population density of 36.09 people per square kilometer (93.48 people per square mile), given its area of 2,710.41 square kilometers (1046.50 square miles), lower than the North Gondar Zone average of 70.19 people per square kilometer (181.80 people per square mile).

Based on the 2007 national census conducted by the Central Statistical Agency of Ethiopia (CSA), this woreda has a total population of 89,115, of whom 45,874 are men and 43,241 women; 12,258 or 13.8% are urban inhabitants.

The majority of the inhabitants practiced Ethiopian Orthodox Christianity, with 97.8% reporting that as their religion, while 1.4% of the population said they were Muslim.
