= Metemma (woreda) =

District in Amhara Region, Ethiopia

Coordinates: 13°00′N 36°15′E

Metemma መተማ
- Woreda
- Flag
- Interactive map of Metemma
- Zone: Semien Gondar
- Region: Amhara

Area
  - Total: 6,969.97 km^{2} (2,691.12 sq mi)

Population (2012 est.)
  - Total: 123,235
  - Density: 17.68/km^{2} (45.79/sq mi)

Metemma (Amharic: መተማ) is a woreda in Amhara Region, Ethiopia. Part of the Semien Gondar Zone, Metemma is bordered on the south by Qwara, on the west by Sudan, on the north by Mirab Armachiho, on the northeast by Tach Armachiho, on the east by Chilga, and on the southeast by Takusa. The administrative center is Shehedi; other towns in Metemma include Metemma and Shinfa.

== Overview ==
Elevations in this woreda range between 550 and 1600 meters above sea level. annual rainfall ranges from 850 to around 1100mm. the temperature is with in the range of 13.6 to 35.5 with higher temperature readings of about up to 41 in warmest months. Rivers include the Atbarah, the Genda Wuha, the Guang and the Shenfa. The natural vegetation of this woreda is predominantly Acacia trees with Hyparrhenia grasses growing beneath. Another common tree here is Neem (Azadirachta indica), which is frequently planted along roads in the towns, and as shade trees in rural areas. A survey of the land in this woreda shows that 23.6% is arable or cultivable, 4.13% pasture, 71% forest or shrubland, and the remaining 1.3% is considered degraded or other. Teff, corn, sorghum, cotton and sesame are important cash crops; the town of Metemma serves as an important trade gateway between Sudan and the Amhara Region. Between November 2000 and June 2002, SUR Construction built three road segments connecting Metemma with Wohni by way of Shehedi, totalling in length 70 kilometers.

The economy of Metemma is predominantly agricultural. This woreda has been the major center of cotton production inside Ethiopia since the 1950s. In 2003/2004, 21.1 square kilometers were planted in cotton, yielding 168,592 qt of crop. Gum arabic and incense are important cash crops in this woreda; the principal species which produce incense is Boswellia papyrifera, while Acacia seyal and A. polyacantha are harvested for their gum. Three private companies are involved in harvesting incense, which together produce about 500 qt annually. Of the 18 rural kebeles, 12 have organized Farming Service Cooperatives with 2,995 members, and the remaining 6 are in the process of organizing cooperatives. Six cooperatives joined in 200 to form the Metemma Cooperative Union. One micro-finance institution operates in this woreda, the Amhara Credit and Saving Institution SC (ACSI); established in 1998, it has one office at Shehedi and another at Shinfa. As of 2004, ACSI loaned out 5,357,540 Birr to 2,618 clients in this woreda.

Metemma was selected by the Ministry of Agriculture and Rural Development in 2003 as an area for voluntary resettlement for farmers from overpopulated areas. Along with Qwara, the other woreda selected in Amhara that year, that year this woreda became the home for a total of 13,742 heads of households and 12,337 family members.

== Demographics ==
A 2012 estimate puts the population at 123,235. This gives a population density of 17.68 people per square kilometer (45.79 people per square mile), given its area of 6,969.97 square kilometers (2,691.12 square miles), less than a third of the North Gondar Zone average of 70.19 people per square kilometer (181.80 people per square mile).

Based on the 2007 national census conducted by the Central Statistical Agency of Ethiopia (CSA), this woreda has a total population of 110,252, an increase of 100.78% over the 1994 census, of whom 58,748 are men and 51,504 women; 29,698 or 26.94% are urban inhabitants. With an area of 6,969.97 square kilometers, Metemma has a population density of 15.82 people per square kilometer (40.97 people per square mile), which is less than the Zone average of 63.76 people per square kilometer (165.15 people per square mile). A total of 29,378 households were counted in this woreda, resulting in an average of 3.75 persons to a household, and 27,935 housing units. The 1994 national census reported a total population for this woreda of 54,913 in 10,546 households, of whom 29,545 were men and 23,368 women; 11,051 or 20.12% of its population were urban dwellers at the time.

In 1994 the five largest ethnic groups reported in Metemma were the Amhara (78.87%), the Qemant (10.27%), the Tigrayan (7.01%), the Gumuz (2.1%), and the Agaw Awi (1.25%); all other ethnic groups made up 0.5% of the population. Amharic was spoken as a first language by 89.48%, 6.76% spoke Tigrinya, 2.11% Gumuz, and 1.25% spoke Awngi; the remaining 0.4% spoke all other primary languages reported. The majority of the inhabitants practiced Ethiopian Orthodox Christianity with 81.27% reporting that belief, while 18.61% of the population said they were Muslim. This had shifted slightly by 2007, with 83.4% reporting that as their religion, while 16.5% of the population said they were Muslim.
