= Dabat (woreda) =

District in Amhara Region, Ethiopia

Dabat ዳባት
- Woreda
- Location within Ethiopia Location within the Horn of Africa Location within Africa
- Coordinates: 13°10′N 37°40′E
- Country: Ethiopia
- Region: Amhara
- Zone: Semien Gondar

Area
  - Total: 1,187.93 km^{2} (458.66 sq mi)

Population (2012 est.)
  - Total: 159,091
  - Density: 133.923/km^{2} (346.859/sq mi)

Dabat (Amharic: ዳባት) is a woreda in Amhara Region, Ethiopia. Part of the Semien Gondar Zone, Dabat is bordered on the south by Wegera, on the west by Tach Armachiho, on the northwest by Tegeda, and on the northeast by Debarq. Towns in Dabat include Dabat and Wekin.

The highest peak in Dabat is also the highest peak in Ethiopia: Mount Ras Dashan. It is a member of the Semien Mountains, which cover most of this woreda. Due to its inaccessibility and the lack of the most basic infrastructure, in 1999 the Regional government classified Dabat as one of its 47 drought prone and food insecure woredas. Both Dabat and Wekin lie on the Gondar-Debarq highway.

== Demographics ==
A 2012 estimate puts the population at 159,091. This gives a population density of 133.92 people per square kilometer (346.86 people per square mile), given its area of 1,187.93 square kilometers (458.66 square miles), significantly higher than the North Gondar Zone average of 70.19 people per square kilometer (181.80 people per square mile).

Based on the 2007 national census conducted by the Central Statistical Agency of Ethiopia (CSA), this woreda has a total population of 145,509, an increase of 22.72% over the 1994 census, of whom 73,852 are men and 71,657 women; 15,821 or 10.87% are urban inhabitants. With an area of 1,187.93 square kilometers, Dabat has a population density of 122.49 people per square kilometer (317.25 people per square mile), which is greater than the Zone average of 63.76 people per square kilometer (165.15 people per square mile). A total of 31,111 households were counted in this woreda, resulting in an average of 4.68 persons to a household, and 30,293 housing units.

The 1994 national census reported a total population for this woreda of 118,566 in 21,599 households, of whom 60,020 were men and 58,546 women; 10,991 or 9.27% of its population were urban dwellers at the time.

The largest ethnic group reported in Dabat in 1994 was the Amhara (99.44%); all other ethnic groups made up 0.56% of the population. Amharic was spoken as a first language by 99.59%; the remaining 0.41% spoke all other primary languages reported. 97.13% practiced Ethiopian Orthodox Christianity, and 2.79% of the population said they were Muslim. This remained mostly the same in 2007, with 97.7% reporting that as their religion, while 2.4% of the population said they were Muslim.
