= Mirab Armachiho =

Mirab Armachiho ምዕራብ አርማጭሆ
- Woreda
- Flag
- Zone: [Mirab Gondar Zone]
- Region: Amhara Region

Area
  - Total: 2,465.11 km^{2} (951.78 sq mi)

Population (2012 est.)
  - Total: 36,460
  - Density: 14.79/km^{2} (38.31/sq mi)

Mirab Armachiho (Amharic: ምዕራብ አርማጭሆ, lit. 'West Armachiho') is one of the woredas in the Amhara Region of Ethiopia. This woreda is named after "Armachiho", a province in northwestern Ethiopia along the border with Sudan and south of the Tekezé River. Located at the northwestern point of the West Gondar Zone, Mirab Armachiho is bordered on the south by Metemma, on the west by Sudan, on the north by the Wolkait Tegede Woreda, on the northeast by Tegeda, and on the east by Tach Armachiho. Towns in Mirab Armachiho include Abderafi. Mirab Armachiho was part of former Sanja woreda.

== Demographics ==
A 2012 estimate puts the population at 36,460. This gives a population density of 14.79 people per square kilometer (38.31 people per square mile), given its area of 2,465.11 square kilometers (951.78 square miles), less than a quarter of the North Gondar Zone average of 70.19 people per square kilometer (181.80 people per square mile).

Based on the 2007 national census conducted by the Central Statistical Agency of Ethiopia (CSA), this woreda has a total population of 31,730, of whom 17,400 are men and 14,330 women; 15,075 or 47.5% are urban inhabitants.

The majority of the inhabitants practiced Ethiopian Orthodox Christianity, with 88.5% reporting that as their religion, while 11.4% of the population said they were Muslim.
