= Beyeda =

Coordinates: 13°30′N 38°15′E

Beyeda በየዳ
- Interactive map of Beyeda
- Zone: Semien Gondar
- Region: Amhara Region

Area
  - Total: 973.05 km^{2} (375.70 sq mi)

Population (2012 est.)
  - Total: 105,482
  - Density: 108.40/km^{2} (280.76/sq mi)

Beyeda (በየዳ, in Amharic) previously known as Simien (ስሜን in Amharic), is one of the woredas in the Amhara Region of Ethiopia. Located in the eastern most point of the Semien Gondar Zone, Beyeda is bordered on the south by the Wag Hemra Zone, on the west by Jan Amora, on the north by Tselemt, and on the east by the Tekezé River which separates it from the Tigray Region. The capital of Beyeda is Dil Yibza.

The highest peak in Beyeda is Mount Ras Dejen 4620 meters (the highest mountain Ethiopia) and the second is Mount Buait 4437 meters, one of the ten highest mountains in Ethiopia; other notable peaks include Mount Meseraia and Mount Selki. All of these are members of the Semien Mountains, which cover most of this woreda; part of the Semien Mountains National Park is also located in northern Beyeda. Due to its inaccessibility and the lack of the most basic infrastructure, in 1999 the Regional government classified this woreda as one of its 47 drought prone and food insecure woredas.

== Demographics ==
A 2012 estimate puts the population at 105,482. This gives a population density of 108.40 people per square kilometer (280.76 people per square mile), given its area of 973.05 square kilometers (375.70 square miles), higher than the North Gondar Zone average of 70.19 people per square kilometer (181.80 people per square mile).

Based on the 2007 national census conducted by the Central Statistical Agency of Ethiopia (CSA), this woreda has a total population of 97,492, an increase of 27.14% over the 1994 census, of whom 47,877 are men and 49,615 women; 3,292 or 3.38% are urban inhabitants. With an area of 973.05 square kilometers, Beyeda has a population density of 100.19 people per square kilometer (259.49 people per square mile), which is greater than the Zone average of 63.76 people per square kilometer (165.15 people per square mile). A total of 21,742 households were counted in this woreda, resulting in an average of 4.48 persons to a household, and 21,257 housing units.

The 1994 national census reported a total population for this woreda of 76,680 in 16,933 households, of whom 38,369 were men and 38,311 women; 1,001 or 1.31% of its population were urban dwellers at the time.

The largest ethnic group reported in Beyeda was the Amhara (99.99%); all other ethnic groups made up 0.11% of the population. Amharic was spoken as a first language by 99.99%; the remaining 0.11% spoke all other primary languages reported. The majority of the inhabitants practiced Ethiopian Orthodox Christianity, with 99.99% reporting that as their religion. This remained the same in 2007.
