= Dembiya =

Coordinates: 12.3500°N 37.2556°E

Dembiya (Amharic: ደምቢያ Dembīyā; also transliterated Dembea, Dambya, Dembya, Dambiya, etc.) is a historic region of Ethiopia, intimately linked with Lake Tana. Dembiya was bounded on the north-east by Wogera, on the east by Begemder, on South by Gojjam, and on the West by the Agaws of Achefer and Tanqha. Alexander Murray, in his preface to the third volume of Bruce's account, further describes it as "on the east it includes Foggora, Dara, and Alata; on the north-east Gondar, the metropolis, and the rich district beneath it; on the southwest, the district of Bed (the plain barren country) and, on the west, the lands around Waindaga and Dingleber."

Dembiya was incorporated into the Begemder province (which previously only included lands to the east of Lake Tana) during the reign of Emperor Haile Selassie, and in 1996 became a woreda of the Amhara Region.

== History ==
=== 16th century ===
In his 26th years of his reign, Emperor Lebna Dengal spent the rainy season Dembiya.

=== Adal Occupation ===
During the Muslim occupation Adalites under Ahmed ibn Ibrahim burnt the monastery in Gelila Zakarias island on 19th March 1537.

=== Zemene Mesafint ===
During the Zemene Mesafint period Dembiya was governed by Dejazmach Meru and later his nephew Dejazmach Kinfu. Both were famous for taking tribute from Galabat who for long in the past had paid annual tribute to the governors of Dembiya. Dejazmach Kinfu become especially famous for Defeating a large Egyptian force who had tried to invade Ethiopia.
