= Debarq (woreda) =

Coordinates: 13°20′N 37°40′E

Debarq ደባርቅ
- Woreda
- Flag
- Interactive map of Debarq
- Zone: Semien Gondar
- Region: Amhara Region

Area
  - Total: 1,461.18 km^{2} (564.16 sq mi)

Population (2012 est.)
  - Total: 174,589
  - Density: 119.49/km^{2} (309.47/sq mi)

Debarq (Amharic: ደባርቅ) or Debark is one of the woredas in the Amhara Region of Ethiopia. It is named after its largest town, Debarq. Part of the Semien Gondar Zone, Debarq is bordered on the south by Dabat,

on the west by Tegeda, on the northwest by the Tigray Region, on the north by Addi Arkay, and on the east by Jan Amora.

This woreda is crossed by the Lamalmo Mountains, which form the western end of the Semien. Rivers include the Zarima.

Due to its inaccessibility and the lack of the most basic infrastructure, in 1999 the Regional government classified Debarq as one of its 47 drought-prone and food-insecure woredas. To alleviate this situation, the Amhara Credit and Saving Institution SC, a micro-finance institution, opened an office in Debarq in the late 1990s. On 27 May 2009, the Ethiopian Roads Authority announced work to repair and upgrade the road between Debarq and Gondar had begun. The work on the 99 kilometres (62 mi) of road would be done by Sino-Hydro International, a Chinese construction company, with engineering consultancy by a South African company and an Ethiopian firm, Omega Engineers Consulting. The budget for the work is approximately 690 million Birr (US$58.5 million).

== Demographics ==
A 2012 estimate puts the population at 174,589. This gives a population density of 119.48 people per square kilometer (309.47 people per square mile), given its area of 1461.18 square kilometers (564.16 square miles), significantly higher than the North Gondar Zone average of 70.19 people per square kilometer (181.80 people per square mile).

Based on the 2007 national census conducted by the Central Statistical Agency of Ethiopia (CSA), this woreda has a total population of 159,193, an increase of 31.83% over the 1994 census, of whom 80,274 are men and 78,919 women; 20,839 or 13.09% are urban inhabitants. With an area of 1,461.18 square kilometers (564.16 square miles), Debarq has a population density of 108.95 people per square kilometer (282.18 people per square mile), which is greater than the Zone average of 63.76 people per square kilometer (165.15 people per square mile). A total of 33,822 households were counted in this woreda, resulting in an average of 4.71 persons to a household, and 32,573 housing units.

The 1994 national census reported a total population for this woreda of 120,754 in 21,646 households, of whom 60,372 were men and 60,382 women; 14,474 or 11.99% of its population were urban dwellers at the time.

The largest ethnic group reported in Debarq in 1994 was the Amhara (99.42%); all other ethnic groups made up 0.58% of the population. Amharic was spoken as a first language by 99.46%; the remaining 0.54% spoke all other primary languages reported. 93.78% practiced Ethiopian Orthodox Christianity, and 6.16% of the population said they were Muslim. This had changed slightly by 2007, with 94.8% reporting that as their religion, while 5.2% of the population said they were Muslim.
