= Mirab Belessa =

- Woreda
- Flag
- Zone: Semien Gondar
- Region: Amhara Region

Area
  - Total: 1,257.79 km^{2} (485.64 sq mi)

Population (2012 est.)
  - Total: 154,924
  - Density: 123.17/km^{2} (319.01/sq mi)

Mirab Belessa or West Belessa is one of the woredas in the Amhara Region of Ethiopia. It is named after the former province of Belessa, which lay in the same area.

Part of the Semien Gondar Zone, Mirab Belessa is bordered on the south by Debub Gondar Zone, on the west by Gondar Zuria, on the north by the Wegera, and on the east by Misraq Belessa. Towns in Mirab Belessa include Arbaya. Mirab Belessa was part of former Belessa woreda.

== Demographics ==
A 2012 estimate puts the population at 154,924. This gives a population density of 123.17 people per square kilometer (319.01 people per square mile), given its area of 1257.79 square kilometers (485.64 square miles), significantly higher than the North Gondar Zone average of 70.19 people per square kilometer (181.80 people per square mile).

Based on the 2007 national census conducted by the Central Statistical Agency of Ethiopia (CSA), this woreda has a total population of 142,791, of whom 72,829 are men and 69,962 women; 7,666 or 5.4% are urban inhabitants.

The majority of the inhabitants practiced Ethiopian Orthodox Christianity, with 97% reporting that as their religion, while 2.9% of the population said they were Muslim.
