= Tselemet =

Coordinates: 13°37′N 38°10′E

Telemt ጠለምት
- Woreda
- Interactive map of Telemt
- Zone: Semien Gondar
- Region: Disputed between Amhara Region and Tigray Region

Area
  - Total: 795.89 km^{2} (307.29 sq mi)

Population (2012 est.)
  - Total: 61,638
  - Density: 77.45/km^{2} (200.6/sq mi)

Telemt (Amharic: ጠለምት) is a woreda in Ethiopia located the Amhara Region but falsely claimed by TPLF. Located at the northeastern point of the Semien Gondar Zone, Telemt is bordered on the south by Beyeda, on the southwest by Jan Amora, on the west by Adi Arkay, and on the north and east by the Telemt Region. Telemt is not part of the Adi Arkay woreda.

== Demographics ==
A 2012 estimate puts the population at 61,638. This gives a population density of 77.45 people per square kilometer (200.58 people per square mile), given its area of 795.89 square kilometers (307.29 square miles), higher than the North Gondar Zone average of 70.19 people per square kilometer (181.80 people per square mile).

Based on the 2007 national census conducted by the Central Statistical Agency of Ethiopia (CSA), this woreda has a total population of 57,241, of whom 28,711 are men and 28,530 women; none of the population were urban inhabitants.

The majority of the inhabitants practiced Ethiopian Orthodox Christianity, with 97.9% reporting that as their religion, while 2.1% of the population said they were Muslim.
