= Delgi =

Town in the Amhara region of Ethiopia

Delgi (Amharic: ደልጊ) is a town in the Amhara region western Ethiopia. Located on the north-western shore of Lake Tana in the Semien Gondar Zone of the Amhara Region, this town has a latitude and longitude of 12°12′N 37°03′E and an elevation of 1785 meters above sea level. It is the only towns in Takusa woreda and rich in agricultural product and fishery.

A weekly ferry connects Delgi with Gorgora and Bahir Dar.

The Scots explorer James Bruce paused for an hour at the church of Delgi Mariam 30 Oct 1770, and in his memoirs recalled the village of Delgi "adjoining to it [the church], is but small". Nearby is the hill of Goy Mariam, where at the time "the queen-mother has a house"; Bruce further recorded, "All the habitations in this country were burnt by Ras Michael in his return to Gondar. Arthur J. Hayes passed through Delgi twice in 1904 during his circumambulation of Lake Tana, spending three days there in January and three more the next month.

== Demographics ==
Based on figures from the Central Statistical Agency in 2005, this town has an estimated total population of 8,725 of whom 4,120 are men and 4,605 are women. The 1994 census reported Dengel Ber had a total population of 40,054 of whom 2,168 were men and 2,886 were women.
