= Takusa =

District in Amhara Region, Ethiopia

Coordinates: 12.0324°N 36.9466°E

Takusa ጣቁሳ
- Woreda
- Flag
- Interactive map of Takusa
- Zone: Semien Gondar
- Region: Amhara

Area
  - Total: 1,948.96 km^{2} (752.50 sq mi)

Population (2012 est.)
  - Total: 140,090
  - Density: 71.88/km^{2} (186.2/sq mi)

Takusa (Amharic: ጣቁሳ) is a woreda in Amhara Region, Ethiopia. Part of the Semien Gondar Zone, Takusa is bordered on the south by Alefa, on the west by Qwara, on the northwest by the Metemma, on the north by Chilga, on the northeast by Dembiya, and on the east by Lake Tana. Towns in Takusa include Delgi. Takusa was part of Alefa woreda.

== Demographics ==
A 2012 estimate puts the population at 140,090. This gives a population density of 71.88 people per square kilometer (186.17 people per square mile), given its area of 1948.96 square kilometers (752.50 square miles), slightly higher than the North Gondar Zone average of 70.19 people per square kilometer (181.80 people per square mile).

Based on the 2007 national census conducted by the Central Statistical Agency of Ethiopia (CSA), this woreda has a total population of 129,097, of whom 65,782 are men and 63,315 women; 7,087 or 5.5% are urban inhabitants.

The majority of the inhabitants practiced Ethiopian Orthodox Christianity, with 99% reporting that as their religion.
