= Misraq Belessa =

Misraq Belessa ምስራቅ በለሳ
- Woreda
- Flag
- Zone: Semien Gondar
- Region: Amhara Region

Area
  - Total: 1,848.29 km^{2} (713.63 sq mi)

Population (2012 est.)
  - Total: 107,339
  - Density: 58.07/km^{2} (150.41/sq mi)

Misraq Belessa (Amharic: ምስራቅ በለሳ) transliterated as "East Belessa" is one of the woredas in the Amhara Region of Ethiopia. It is named after the former province of Belessa, which lay in the

same area. Part of the Semien Gondar Zone, Misraq Belessa is bordered on the south by Debub Gondar Zone, on the west by Mirab Belessa, on the northwest by the Wegera, on the north by Jan Amora, and on the east by Wag Hemra Zone. Towns in Misraq Belessa include Gohala (ጓኽላ) & Hamusit (ሀሙሲት). Misraq Belessa was part of former Belessa woreda.

== Demographics ==
A 2012 estimate puts the population at 107,339. This gives a population density of 58.07 people per square kilometer (150.41 people per square mile), given its area of 1848.29 square kilometers (1321.59 square miles), lower than the North Gondar Zone average of 70.19 people per square kilometer (181.80 people per square mile).

Based on the 2007 national census conducted by the Central Statistical Agency of Ethiopia (CSA), this woreda has a total population of 97,838, of whom 50,587 are men and 47,251 women; 13,057 or 13.4% are urban inhabitants.

The majority of the inhabitants practiced Ethiopian Orthodox Christianity, with 98% reporting that as their religion, while 2% of the population said they were Muslim.
