= Dengel Ber =

- Location in Ethiopia
- Coordinates: 11°57′N 37°00′E
- Country: Ethiopia
- Region: Amhara Region
- Zone: Semien Gondar Zone
- Elevation: 1,790 m (5,870 ft)

Population (2005 est.)
  - Total: 2,439
- Time zone: UTC+3 (EAT)

Dengel Ber is a town in western Ethiopia. Located on the south-western shore of Lake Tana in the Semien Gondar Zone of the Amhara Region, this town has a latitude and longitude of 11°57′N 37°00′E. Access to this town includes track roads to both Shawra and Kunzela and weekly service by the Bahir Dar-Gorgora ferry on Lake Tana. While the name of the town is indisputably Amharic, there is some disagreement over the meaning of its name: while "Pass of the Virgin" has been the most common interpretation since at least the days James Bruce visited Ethiopia, Huntingford and Beckingham state that it means "pass of canna plants".

== History ==
Located on shore on the western shore of Lake Tana opposite Dek Island, Dengel Bar is dominated by a tall rock which leaves only a narrow passage, controlling access between Gojjam and Gondar on the west side of the lake. For example, Ras Mikael Sehul accompanied by Emperor Tekle Haymanot camped here on their march south against Fasil of Damot. When he faced an attack from Ras Ali II at the beginning of 1852, Dejazmach Kasa (the future Emperor Tewodros II) moved from Agawmeder to a fortified position near Dengel Ber. Ali's officers found the position too strong to attack, so they bypassed it and proceeded north to Dembiya.

Despite this history, by the time P. H. G. Powell-Cotton visited the town in May 1900, he reported finding only ruined stone houses. According to the materials on the Nordic African Institute, Dengel Bar was the administrative center of Alefa woreda, prior to Shawra; it also provides details of a primary school in this town during the year 1968.

== Demographics ==
Based on figures from the Central Statistical Agency in 2005, this town has an estimated total population of 2,439 of whom 1,252 are men and 1,187 are women. The 1994 census reported Dengel Ber had a total population of 1,403 of whom 659 were men and 744 were women. It is one of four towns in Alefa woreda.
