= Chilga =

District in Amhara Region, Ethiopia

Coordinates: 12°45′N 36°40′E

Chilga ጭልጋ
- Woreda
- Flag
- Interactive map of Chilga
- Zone: Central Gondar Zone
- Region: Amhara

Area
  - Total: 3,071.65 km^{2} (1,185.97 sq mi)

Population (2012 est.)
  - Total: 241,627
  - Density: 78.66/km^{2} (203.74/sq mi)

Chilga (Amharic: ጭልጋ č̣ilgā) also Chelga, Ch'ilga is a woreda in Amhara Region, Ethiopia. It is named after its chief town Chilga (also known as Ayikel), an important stopping point on the historic Gondar-Sudan trade route. Part of the Central Gondar Zone, Chilga is bordered on the south by Takusa, on the west by Metemma, on the north by Tach Armachiho, on the northeast by Lay Armachiho, and on the east by Dembiya. Other towns in Chilga include Seraba and Wohni.

== Overview ==
Elevations in this woreda range between 1000 and 1500 meters above sea level. Rivers include the Atbarah. A survey of the land in this woreda shows that 21.7% is arable or cultivable, 1.9% pasture, 22.3% forest or shrubland, and the remaining 54.1% is considered degraded or other. This survey covered more of the woreda than the sample enumeration performed by the Central Statistical Agency (CSA) in 2001.

One notable landmark in this woreda is the archeological site at Chilga Kernet, which was investigated in 2002 as part of the Blue Nile Basin Survey Project. The surface of the site was reported to be "littered with several thousand hand axes and other heavily weathered basalt implements". A preliminary survey led the investigators to speculate that much of the hill is underlain by a layer of Acheulean artifacts of about 2 hectares in size. A program was announced in 2008, which would spend three million Birr on construction of new health stations, at which time there were 45 health posts and two health stations in Chilga, providing health coverage for 88% of the woreda.

== Demographics ==
A 2012 estimate puts the population at 241,627. This gives a population density of 78.66 people per square kilometer (203.75 people per square mile), given its area of 3,071.65 square kilometers (1,185.97 square miles), higher than the North Gondar Zone average of 70.19 people per square kilometer (181.80 people per square mile).

Based on the 2007 national census conducted by the Central Statistical Agency of Ethiopia (CSA), this woreda has a total population of 221,462, an increase of 33.34% over the 1994 census, of whom 112,054 are men and 109,408 women; 20,745 or 9.37% are urban inhabitants. With an area of 3,071.65 square kilometers, Chilga has a population density of 72.10 people per square kilometer (186.73 people per square mile), which is greater than the Zone average of 63.76 people per square kilometer (165.15 people per square mile). A total of 47,336 households were counted in this woreda, resulting in an average of 4.68 persons to a household, and 45,352 housing units.

The 1994 national census reported a total population for this woreda of 166,086 in 29,955 households, of whom 84,798 were men and 81,288 women; 9,618 or 5.79% of its population were urban dwellers at the time.

The two largest ethnic groups reported in 1994 in Chilga were the Amhara (68.65%), and the Qemant (30.77%); all other ethnic groups made up 0.51% of the population. Amharic was spoken as a first language by 99%, and Qemant by 0.83%; the remaining 0.17% spoke all other primary languages reported. The majority of the inhabitants practiced Ethiopian Orthodox Christianity, with 96.21% embracing that faith, while 3.7% of the population said they were Muslim. By 2007 this had changed very little, with 96.7% reporting Ethiopian Orthodox Christianity as their religion, while 3.1% of the population said they were Muslim.

Although the Amhara people are the predominant ethnic group in this woreda, the Qemant, one of the Agaw people, are an important minority who are concentrated around the town of Aykel. Although the priestly head of the Chilga Qement is the spiritual leader of the Qement south of the Gwang River, the other head priest, who lives at Tekle Dingay, has more prestige. For this reason, the head priest of Chilga on occasion travels to Tekle Dingay to participate in holiday festivities, while the head priest in the latter town does not return the visit.

== Economy ==
The economy of Chilga is predominantly agricultural. According to the Atlas of the Ethiopian Rural Economy published by the CSA, there are no agricultural cooperatives in this woreda. Estimated all-weather road density is reported to be between 10.1 and 20 kilometers per 1000 square kilometers. Coal-bearing clay seams near Chilga, north-west of Lake Tana and 35 km from Gondar, were explored in 1937, 1952, and 1960.

A sample enumeration performed by the CSA in 2001 interviewed 33,624 farmers in this woreda, who held an average of 0.61 hectares of land. The earlier survey found that of the land under cultivation in Chilga, 64.53% was planted in cereals like teff, maize and finger millet, 2.81% in pulses like horse beans, 8.3% in oilseeds like neug, 0.72% in perennial crops like coffee, 0.62% in root crops, 0.45% in vegetables, and 12.57% all other crops. Permanent crops included 47.13 hectares planted in coffee, 337.01 in gesho or hops, and 8.02 in fruit trees. 88.76% of the farmers both raise crops and livestock, while 8.57% only grow crops and 2.68% only raise livestock.

== Notable people ==
- Tamagn Beyene
