= Tegeda =

Tegede ጠገዴ
- Woreda
- Flag
- Zone: Semien Gondar
- Region: Amhara Region

Area
  - Total: 2,589.22 km^{2} (999.70 sq mi)

Population (2012 est.)
  - Total: 80,389
  - Density: 31.05/km^{2} (80.41/sq mi)

Tegede (Amharic: ጠገዴ) is one of the woredas in the Amhara Region of Ethiopia. Part of the Semien Gondar Zone, Tegeda is bordered on the south by Tach Armachiho, on the west by Mirab Armachiho, on the north by the Tigray Region, on the northeast by Debarq, and on the east by Dabat. Towns in Tegeda include Kirakir. Tegeda was part of former Sanja woreda.

== Demographics ==
A 2012 estimate puts the population at 80,389. This gives a population density of 31.05 people per square kilometer (80.41 people per square mile), given its area of 2589.22 square kilometers (999.70 square miles), less than half the North Gondar Zone average of 70.19 people per square kilometer (181.80 people per square mile).

Based on the 2007 national census conducted by the Central Statistical Agency of Ethiopia (CSA), this woreda has a total population of 73,898, of whom 37,717 are men and 36,181 women; 5,359 or 7.3% are urban inhabitants.

The majority of the inhabitants practiced Ethiopian Orthodox Christianity, with 97.8% reporting that as their religion, while 2.1% of the population said they were Muslim.
