= Tamagn Beyene =

Ethiopian human rights activist and media personality

Tamagne Beyene
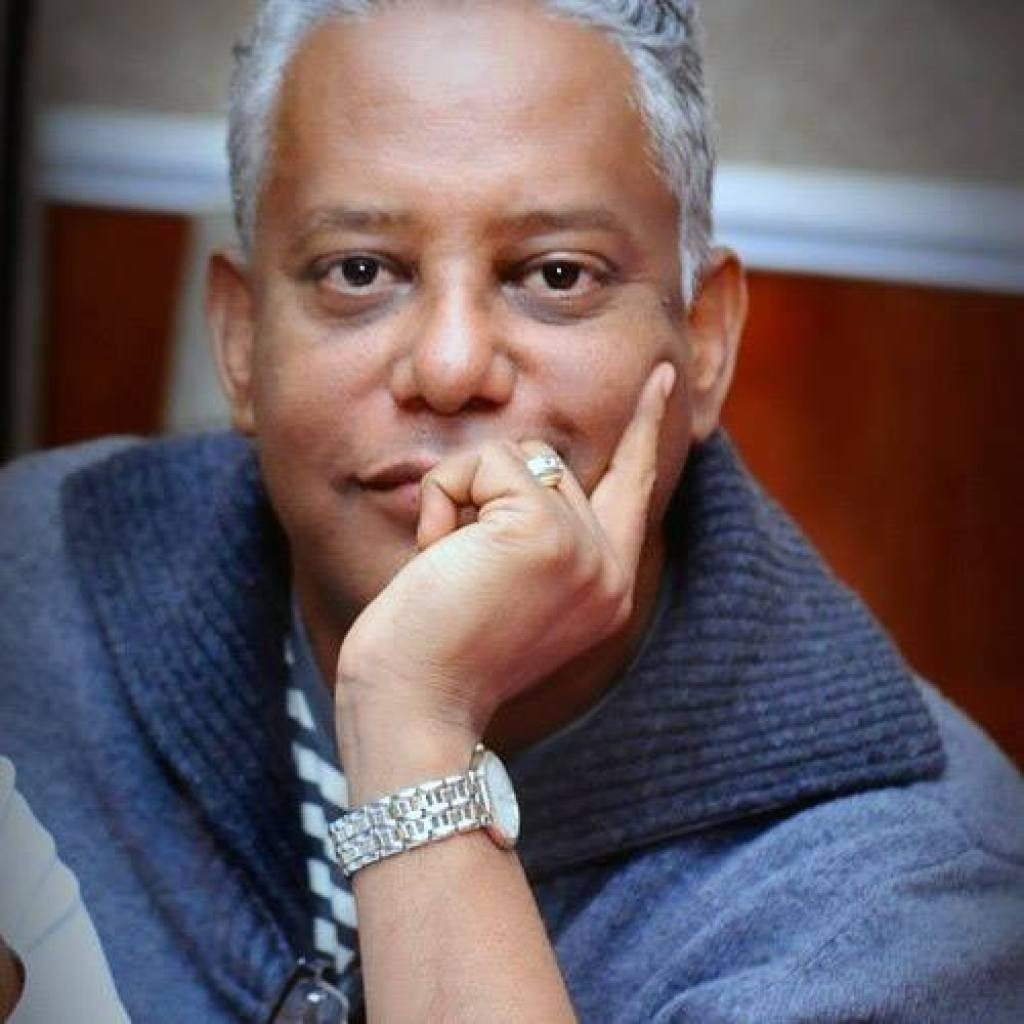
- Born: Aykel City Chilga District , Gondar, Ethiopia
- Occupations: Political activist; actor; comedian; media personality
- Years active: 1981–present
- Television: Tamagn Show
- Political party: Independent

Tamagne Beyene (Amharic: ታማኝ በየነ) is an Ethiopian human rights activist, former actor, comedian and media personality. Born in Gondar, Tamagne was recruited to the Gondar Traditional Group in 1981. He soon joined the Ethiopian National Theatre in 1983, performing as comedian, actor, singer, drummer and saxophonist.

During the Tigray People's Liberation Front regime, Tamagne exiled to the United States in 1996 and worked as activist against the authoritarian government. Tamagne finally returned to Ethiopia by the call of Prime Minister Abiy Ahmed in September 2018.

Accordingly to available resources Tamagn Beyene has been described as a strong activist . The subject has both positive and negative attention from different groups.

== Life and career ==
Tamagn Beyene was born Chilga, a small town in Gondar. At his young age, he established a Children's Musical Group, and was later recruited to the Gondar Traditional Group in 1981. As his enthusiasm at arts and theatre influenced gradually, he was recruited by the National Theatre in 1983. Since then, he served in the National Theatre in various aspects. Tamagne played a mult-facet professions in the theater: comedian, singer, drummer and saxophonist.

After the Tigray People's Liberation Front (TPLF) came to power in 1991, he chose exile in Washington D.C. in 1996. He opposed the authoritarian TPLF regime and its ethnocentric policies and he was under political persecution, which made him a political activist.

When Abiy Ahmed came to power in April 2018, he called the opposition groups of the former ruling party, the Ethiopian People's Revolutionary Democratic Front (EPRDF), including Tamagne, to return in Ethiopia. On 1 September 2018, Tamagne returned to Addis Ababa after spending 27 years in the United States. He was welcomed by government officials of Ministry of Industry Ambachew Mekonnen and Mayor of Addis Ababa Takele Uma Banti.

== External Source ==
- https://youtube.com/@tamagneshow?si=bRIVmIrAEZmqIM-P
