= Ayikel =

Ayikel (Amharic: አይከል), also known as Chilga, is a town in western Ethiopia. Located in the Semien Gondar Zone of the Amhara Region, it has a latitude and longitude of 12°33′N 37°04′E with an altitude of 2146 meters above sea level. The settlement is situated on the east–west road connecting Gondar with Metemma, and is the administrative center of Chilga woreda.

Ayikel is mentioned, by its older name of "Chilga", by James Bruce, as a marketplace on the border between the Kingdom of Sennar and Ethiopia which was under their shared administration, and over which Emperor Susenyos in 1606 appointed the deposed king of Senaar, Abd al-Qadir as governor.

== Demographics ==
Based on figures from the Central Statistical Agency in 2005, this town has an estimated total population of 14,480 of whom 7,063 are men and 7,417 are women. The 1994 census reported Dengel Ber had a total population of 8,364 of whom 3,716 were men and 4,648 were women.
