= Alefa =

Coordinates: 12°15′N 36°20′E

Alefa ዐለፋ
- Woreda
- Flag
- Interactive map of Alefa
- Zone: Semien Gondar
- Region: Amhara Region

Area
  - Total: 1,961.66 km^{2} (757.40 sq mi)

Population (2012 est.)
  - Total: 185,357
  - Density: 94.4899/km^{2} (244.728/sq mi)

Alefa (Amharic: ዐለፋ) is one of the woredas in the Amhara Region of Ethiopia. Part of the Semien Gondar Zone, Alefa is bordered on the southwest by the Agew Awi Zone, on the west by Qwara, on the north by Takusa, on the east by Lake Tana and on the southeast by the Mirab Gojjam Zone. The administrative center of Alefa is Shawra; other towns include Dengel Ber, Esey Dibir and Gomenge. Rivers include the Dinder. Jawi and Takusa woredas were separated from Alefa.

Alefa is named after the historic region to the southwest of Lake Tana, which was the target of a punitive expedition led by Emperor Susenyos in 1608.

== Demographics ==
A 2012 estimate puts the population at 185,357. This gives a population density of 94.49 people per square kilometer (244.73 people per square mile), given its area of 1,961.66 square kilometers (757.40 square miles), higher than the North Gondar Zone average of 70.19 people per square kilometer (181.80 people per square mile).

Based on the 2007 national census conducted by the Central Statistical Agency of Ethiopia (CSA), this woreda has a total population of 170,491, an increase of -20.32% over the 1994 census, of whom 86,350 are men and 84,141 women; 11,639 or 6.83% are urban inhabitants. With an area of 1,961.66 square kilometers, Alefa has a population density of 86.91, which is greater than the Zone average of 63.76 people per square kilometer (225.10 people per square mile). A total of 36,072 households were counted in this woreda, resulting in an average of 4.73 persons to a household, and 34,901 housing units.

The 1994 national census reported a total population for this woreda of 213,961 in 41,309 households, of whom 110,112 were men and 103,849 women; 12,012 or 5.61% of its population were urban dwellers at the time.

The two largest ethnic groups reported in Alefa in 1994 were the Amhara (96.49%), and the Agaw Awi (3.19%); all other ethnic groups made up 0.32% of the population and others 0.32. Amharic was spoken as a first language by 96.75%, and 3.18% spoke Awngi; the remaining 0.07% spoke all other primary languages reported. 99.36% practiced Ethiopian Orthodox Christianity. This remained largely the same by 2007, with 99.5% reporting that as their religion.

== Economy ==
A sample enumeration performed by the CSA in 2001 interviewed 46,683 farmers in this woreda, who held an average of 0.73 hectares of land. Of the 63.72 square kilometers of private land surveyed, 94.92% was under cultivation, 3.46% was pasture, none was fallow, and the remaining 1.62% is devoted to other uses; the amount of woodland held is missing. For the land under cultivation in Alefa, 75.38% was planted in cereals like teff, sorghum and maize, 0.5% in pulses like horse beans, 0.24% in perennial crops like coffee, and 6.3% all other crops; the figures for the total area in oilseeds, root crops and vegetables are missing. Permanent crops included 112.86 hectares planted in coffee, 103.85 in gesho or hops, and 2.56 in fruit trees. 79.8% of the farmers both raise crops and livestock, while 15.4% only grow crops and 4.75% only raise livestock. uu
