= Lay Armachiho =

District in Amhara Region, Ethiopia

Coordinates: 13°00′N 37°10′E

Lay Armachiho ላይ አርማጭሆ
- Woreda
- Flag
- Interactive map of Lay Armachiho
- Zone: Semien Gondar
- Region: Amhara

Area
  - Total: 1,059.33 km^{2} (409.01 sq mi)

Population (2012 est.)
  - Total: 171,867
  - Density: 162.241/km^{2} (420.203/sq mi)

Lay Armachiho (Amharic: ላይ አርማጭሆ, romanized: lāy ārmāčihō, lit. 'Upper Armachiho') is a woreda in Amhara Region, Ethiopia. This woreda is named after "Armachiho", a province in northwestern Ethiopia along the border with Sudan and south of the Tekezé River. Part of the Central Gondar Zone, Lay Armachiho is bordered on the south by Dembiya, on the west by Chilga, on the north by Tach Armachiho, on the east by Wegera, and on the southeast by Gondar Zuria. The administrative center of this woreda is Tekle Dingay.

Lay Armachiho was selected by the Ministry of Agriculture and Rural Development as an area for voluntary resettlement for farmers from overpopulated areas in the fourth round of resettlement program. Along with Qwara and Dangila in the Amhara Region, and Tsegede in the Tigray Region, this woreda became the new home for 8,671 families. This round of resettlement was reportedly accompanied with almost 68 million Birr in infrastructure development.

== Demographics ==
A 2012 estimate puts the population at 171,867. This gives a population density of 162.24 people per square kilometer (420.20 people per square mile), given its area of 1059.33 square kilometers (409.01 square miles). This is significantly higher than the North Gondar Zone average of 70.19 people per square kilometer (181.80 people per square mile), but very close to the average of the Amhara Region at 169.16 people per square kilometer (438.11 people per square mile).

Based on the 2007 national census conducted by the Central Statistical Agency of Ethiopia (CSA), this woreda has a total population of 157,836, an increase of 34.36% over the 1994 census, of whom 79,538 are men and 78,298 women; 12,546 or 7.95% are urban inhabitants. With an area of 1,059.33 square kilometers, Lay Armachiho has a population density of 149.00 people per square kilometer (385.90 people per square mile), which is greater than the Zone average of 63.76 people per square kilometer (165.15 people per square mile). A total of 33,373 households were counted in this woreda, resulting in an average of 4.73 persons to a household, and 32,420 housing units. The 1994 national census reported a total population for this woreda of 117,471 in 21,411 households, of whom 58,697 were men and 58,774 women; 4,784 or 4.07% of its population were urban dwellers at the time.

In 1994 the two largest ethnic groups reported in Lay Armachiho were the Qemant (63.89%), and the Amhara (35.76%); all other ethnic groups made up 0.35% of the population. Amharic was spoken as a first language by 99.73%; the remaining 0.27% spoke all other primary languages reported. The majority of the inhabitants practiced Ethiopian Orthodox Christianity, with 97.1% reporting that belief, while 2.72% of the population said they were Muslim. In 2007 this had changed little, with 97.9% reporting Ethiopian Orthodox Christianity as their religion, while 2% of the population said they were Muslim. The Qemant, one of the Agaw people, are the largest ethnic group living in this woreda, and are concentrated around the town of Tekle Dingay. The head priest in Tekle Dingay has more prestige than his counterpart in Chilga woreda, because he rules their traditional homeland.
