= Weyto caste =

Ethnic group and caste in Ethiopia

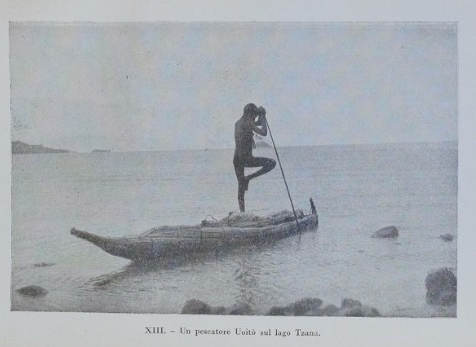
Weyto fisherman at Lake Tana

The Weyto (also Wayto) (Note: alternate spellings: Uoito, Wayto, Waito, Wohito, Weyt’o, Woyto, Weyito.) (Amharic: ወይጦ) are a caste living in the Amhara region along the shore of Lake Tana in northern Ethiopia. They worship the Nile River and their ethnonym is related to the Weito River in Ethiopia's south. They currently live in Bahir Dar, Abirgha, Dembiya and Alefa. The Weyto also made up part of the population of the Blue Nile Falls and Fogera, where currently their presence has not been ascertained.

The Weyto are thought to have been one of the Konso tribes that migrated to northern Ethiopia, assimilating through time as a caste among the dominant Amhara people. Their endogamous stratum has existed in the hierarchical Amhara society, one of the largest ethnic groups found in Ethiopia and neighboring regions. Their hereditary occupation was hunting and leather work (tanning).

== Etymology ==
The general term for hunter-gatherers in Ethiopia is Wayṭo/Woyṭo in Amharic (Uoïto in Italian records), Watta (pl. Watto) in Oromo, Fuga in the Gurage, and Manjō (Mangiò in Italian records) in Kafa. At least one group is reported to have called themselves Addō or Addoyē, though that may be the Oromo word for 'potters', another minority caste. Despite being lumped under common terms for hunter-gatherer, the Amharic-speaking Wayṭo of Lake Tana are a distinct people from the Kafa-speaking Manjō of the Keffa Zone, as well as from other Wayṭo/Watta/Fuga groups elsewhere in Ethiopia.

== Weyto lifestyle ==
The Weytos’ livelihood strongly depended on Lake Tana; they used to fish and hunt hippopotamus – they were organised autonomously and equally divided their catch. In the 20th century, the demand for ivory tusks increased. Combined with the introduction of rifles, this led to a rapid decrease of the hippo population, and the Weyto turned to fishing and agriculture. By the 1960s, the fish catches decreased also and many Weyto reverted to stone crushing and “tankwa” reed boat preparation. There was more trade with, and also land lease from the Amhara, but this did not decrease the social distance between the Weyto and the Amhara.

Currently, the Weyto rely on the lake for fish, papyrus grass, and regression agriculture on the shores. The men produce reed boats for sale, and the women do basketry. Petty trade is a further source of income. The Weyto people are described in historical texts as a group of hippopotamus hunters in Ethiopia around Lake Tana, Lake Zwai and Bahir Dar. Due to their diet on hippopotamus meat, the Weyto have been considered an outcast people and despised by the Amhara and other ethnic groups. Similar castes with hunting occupation live in other parts of the Horn of Africa, states Ephrem Tadesse, such as "the Watta among the Oromo, the Fuga or Mana among the Gurage, the Manjo among the Kaffa, the Kwegu among the Mursi/Bodi, the Hadicho among the Sidama, and the Mijan and Yibir among the Somali". Enrico Cerulli also linked them to those two other outcast groups among the Borana and Kaffa with similar names that live primarily as hunters.

The Weyto have been a small part of a more elaborate Amhara caste system, ranked higher than slaves in its social stratification system. According to Donald N. Levine, an Ethiopian Studies specialist, the caste system depended on: endogamy; hierarchical status; restraints on commensality; pollution concepts; traditional occupation; inherited caste membership. Scholars accept that there has been a rigid, endogamous and occupationally closed social stratification among Amhara and other Afro-Asiatic-speaking Ethiopian ethnic groups. However, some label it as an economically closed, endogamous class system or as occupational minorities, whereas others such as the historian David Todd assert that this system can be unequivocally labelled as caste-based.

== Language ==
The Weyto are reported to have once spoken a Weyto language, likely belonging to the Cushitic family. The language became extinct at some point in the 19th century. According to the 1994 national census, 1172 individuals were reported belonging to this ethnic group; it was not an ethnic choice in the 2007 census. The Weyto language was last documented in 1928. It has now disappeared and was replaced by Amharic. Mittwoch described a form of Amharic spoken by the descendants of Weyto speakers, and describes it as an incomplete language shift from Weyto to Amharic.

== Religion ==
The Weytos’ religion was related to water. “Abinas” was the God of the Blue Nile and provided resources and health. In return, the people sacrificed animals for Abinas. The Weyto have converted to Islam, while continuing to worship the Nile.

== Outcasting of the Weyto ==
The Amhara people consider the Weyto impure, because they eat catfish and supposedly hippopotamus, though the last hippo hunt dates back to the 1960s. The Weyto population has long been marginalised by the Amharas settled on Lake Tana's shores. For instance, in Bahir Dar, the Weyto are outcasts because their traditional lifestyle is considered impure. For the Orthodox Christians, Weyto food habits are impure, and the Muslim community does not recognise them as true Muslims because they continue worshipping the Nile. Hence, the majority of the population remains wary of the Weyto. Scholarly disregard and the everyday culture of other ethnic groups also causes the dismissal of the Weyto culture.

Power relations in the early constitution of Bahir Dar as a town have led to a situation in which the marginalisation of the Wayto has been institutionalised. Access to the city’s facilities, including education and health care, remain out of reach based on stigmata. — Nadine Appelhans, PhD thesis, Hamburg University

The health of the Weyto community in Bahir Dar is strongly affected because they continue drinking the lake's water, which has become heavily polluted.

== Weyto settlements ==
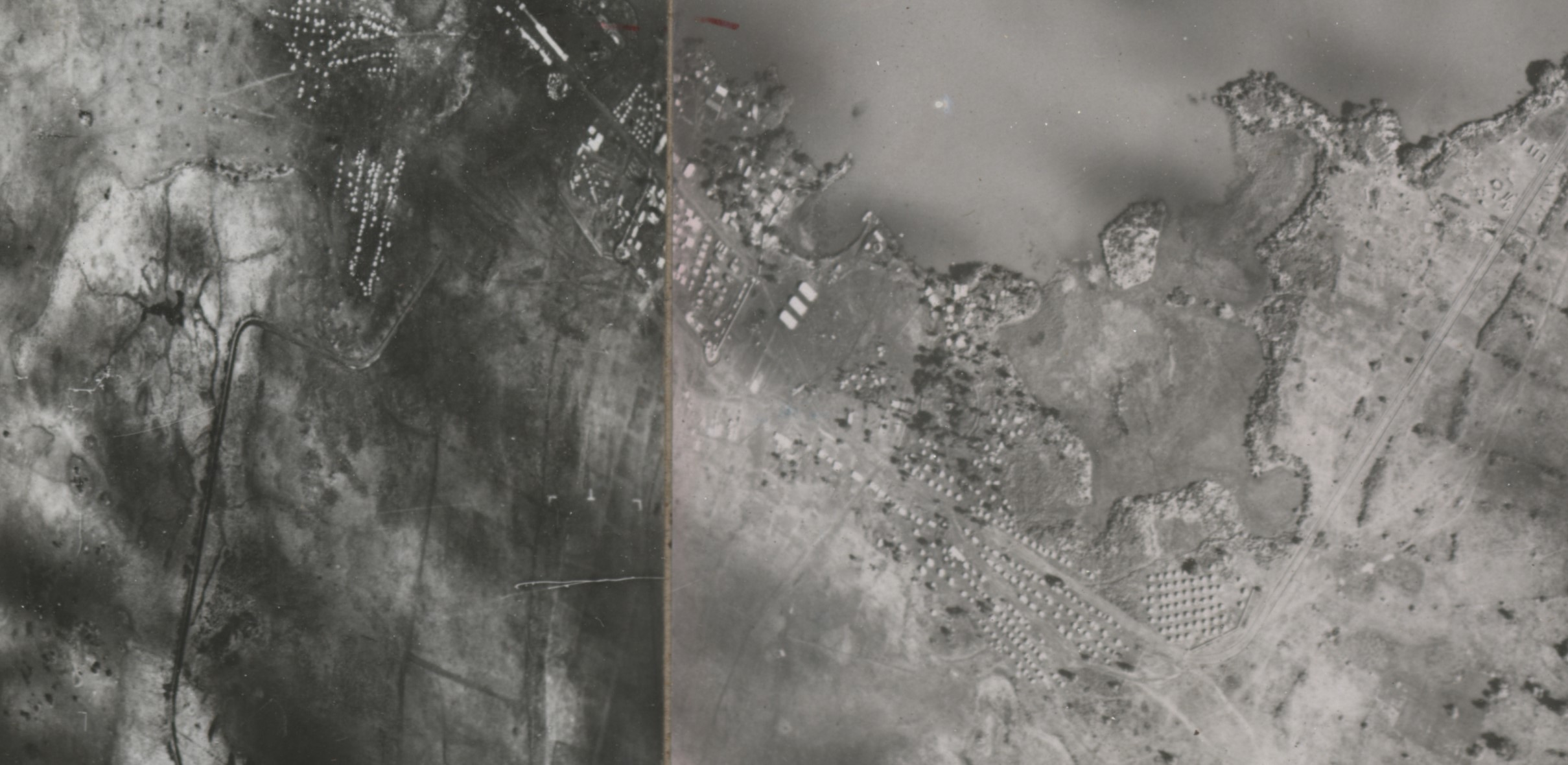
Aerial view of Bahir Dar in 1938 with Wayto villages on the lakeshore and the regular Italian town

In 1938, an Italian tourist guide noticed well established Weyto villages on Bahir Dar's lakeshore. Currently, the Weyto live in three distinct villages within Bahir Dar's city boundaries; the buildings are made of clay with thatched roofs and have a lifespan of about five years. The Weyto villages need regularly to change their place by order of the authorities for several reasons:

- ritual places are contested by other population groups
- Amhara have greater financial power to obtain the land
- the Weyto do not hold land titles
- overall, they have a weak position in negotiation

== See also ==
- Caste systems in Africa
