= Weyto language =

Speculative extinct language of Ethiopia

Weyto
- Native to: Ethiopia
- Region: Lake Tana
- Ethnicity: Weyto caste
- Extinct: by 1907
- Language family: unclassified (Agaw?)

Language codes
- ISO 639-3: woy
- Glottolog: weyt1237

Weyto (also called Wayto) is a speculative extinct language thought to have been spoken in the Lake Tana region of Ethiopia by the Weyto, a small group of hippopotamus hunters who now speak Amharic.

== History ==
The Weyto language was first mentioned by the Scottish traveler James Bruce, who spoke Amharic. Bruce passed through the area about 1770 and reported that "the Weyto speak a language radically different from any of those in Abyssinia," but was unable to obtain any "certain information" on it, despite prevailing upon the king to send for two Weyto men for him to ask questions, which they would "neither answer nor understand" even when threatened with hanging.

The next European to report on the Weyto, Eugen Mittwoch (1907), described them as uniformly speaking a dialect of Amharic. This report was confirmed by Marcel Griaule when he passed through in 1928, although he added that at one point a Weyto sang an unrecorded song "in the dead language of the Wohitos" whose meaning the singer himself did not understand, except for a handful of words for hippopotamus body parts which, he says, had remained in use.

== Classification ==
The paucity of the data available has not prevented speculation on the classification of their original language. Cohen suggested that it might have been either an Agaw language or a non-Amharic Semitic language, while Dimmendaal (1989) says it "probably belonged to Cushitic" (as does Agaw), and Gamst (1965) says "...it can be assumed that if the Wäyto did not speak Amharic 200 years ago, their language must have been Agäw..." According to the Ethnologue, Bender et al. (1976) saw it as Cushitic, while Bender (1983) saw it as either Eastern Sudanic or Awngi.

== Vocabulary ==
This Amharic dialect is described by Marcel Cohen (1939) as featuring a fair number of words derived from Amharic roots but twisted in sound or meaning in order to confuse outsiders, making it a sort of argot. In addition, the dialect had a small number of Cushitic loanwords not found in standard Amharic, and a large number of Arabic loanwords mainly related to Islam. Of the substantial wordlist collected by Griaule, Cohen only considered six terms to be etymologically obscure: šəlkərít "fish-scale", qəntat "wing", čəgəmbit "mosquito", annessa "shoulder", ^{ə}nk^{i}es "hippopotamus thigh", wazəməs "hippopotamus spine." By 1965, the visiting anthropologist Frederick Gamst found "no surviving native words, not even relating to their hunting and fishing work tasks."

== Sources ==
- Bruce, James M. 1790. Travels to Discover the Source of the Nile, 1768-73 (5 vols.) Edinburgh: G. Robinson & J. Robinson. (vol. iii, p. 403)
- Cohen, Marcel. Nouvelles Etudes d'Ethiopien Méridional. Paris: Champion. pp. 358–371.
- Gamst, Frederick (1979). "Wayto ways: Change from hunting to peasant life". In Hess (ed.). Proceedings of the 5th International Conference on Ethiopian Studies, Session B. Chicago: University of Illinois at Chicago Circle.
- Gamst, Frederick. 1984. "Wayto", in Weeks, R. V. (ed.), Muslim peoples: a world ethnographic survey, 2nd edition, (2 vols.) Westport, CT: Greenwood Press.
- Sommer, Gabriele (1992-12-31), "A survey on language death in Africa", in Brenzinger, Matthias (ed.), Language Death, DE GRUYTER, pp. 301–418, doi:10.1515/9783110870602.301, ISBN 978-3-11-013404-9
