= Wand Bewossen =

Dejazmach Wand Bewossen (died 10 December 1777) was a prominent figure in Ethiopian history. He was governor of Lasta and later Begemeder. He was on the losing side in the Battle of Nefas Mewcha (1769), but one of the victorious generals in the Three battles of Sarbakusa (May 1771). He was also married to Woizero Yeworqweha, who was a descendant of Iyasu I and Woizero Wossen Azal, daughter of Dejazmatch Eshete Awsgenyos, sometime Governor of Agaw and Damot.

Not long after his marriage to Woizero Ayabdar, Wand Bewossen desired to wed Wossen Azal, the sister of Hailu Eshte. Hailu would not consent to this marriage: according to Herbert Weld Blundell's translation Hailu considered this alliance bigamous, but Donald Crummy's interpretation of the Ge'ez text is Hailu was more concerned about the incestuous nature of the marriage. Wand Bewsossen then resorted to physical force to Hailu until he finally dropped all of his objections to the alliance. He was killed at Ashawa when he fell from his horse.

== See also ==
- Zemene Mesafint
