= Wegera (woreda) =

District in Amhara Region, Ethiopia

Coordinates: 13°00′N 37°40′E

Wogera ወገራ
- Woreda
- Flag
- Interactive map of Wogera
- Zone: Central Gondar Zone
- Region: Amhara

Area
  - Total: 1,851.52 km^{2} (714.88 sq mi)

Population (2012 est.)
  - Total: 240,346
  - Density: 129.81/km^{2} (336.21/sq mi)

Wegera or Wogera (Amharic: ወገራ), is a woreda in Amhara Region, Ethiopia. Wegera is named for the former province Wegera, which was located roughly in the same location, and was later made part of the province of Semien. Part of the Central Gondar Zone, Wegera is bordered on the south by Mirab Belessa, on the southwest by Gondar Zuria, on the west by Lay Armachiho, on the northwest by Tach Armachiho, on the north by Dabat, on the northeast by Jan Amora, and on the southeast by Misraq Belessa. Towns in Wegera include Amba Giyorgis and Gedegbe.

Due to its inaccessibility and the lack of the most basic infrastructure, in 1999 the Regional government classified Wegera as one of its 47 drought prone and food insecure woredas.

== Demographics ==
A 2012 estimate puts the population at 240,346. This gives a population density of 129.81 people per square kilometer (336.21 people per square mile), given its area of 1851.52 square kilometers (714.88 square miles), higher than the North Gondar Zone average of 70.19 people per square kilometer (181.80 people per square mile).

Based on the 2007 national census conducted by the Central Statistical Agency of Ethiopia (CSA), this woreda has a total population of 220,566, an increase of 20.14% over the 1994 census, of whom 112,445 are men and 108,121 women; 18,664 or 8.46% are urban inhabitants. With an area of 1,851.52 square kilometers, Wegera has a population density of 119.13, which is greater than the Zone average of 63.76 persons per square kilometer. A total of 46,731 households were counted in this woreda, resulting in an average of 4.72 persons to a household, and 45,394 housing units.The 1994 national census reported a total population for this woreda of 183,589 in 35,155 households, of whom 93,991 were men and 89,598 women; 8,410 or 4.58% of its population were urban dwellers at the time.

In 1994 the two largest ethnic groups reported in Wegera were the Amhara (90.48%), and the Qemant (9.24%); all other ethnic groups made up 0.28% of the population. Amharic was spoken as a first language by 99.74%; the remaining 0.26% spoke all other primary languages reported. The majority of the inhabitants practiced Ethiopian Orthodox Christianity with 97.19% practicing that belief, while 2.76% of the population said they were Muslim. This had changed little by 2007, with 97.5% reporting that as their religion, while 2.5% of the population said they were Muslim.
