= Three battles of Sarbakusa =

Series of royal battles in the Ethiopian Empire (1771)

The three battles of Sarbakusa were three military engagements in Ethiopia during the Zemene Mesafint that took place in May 1771. They pitted Wand Bewossen and Fasil of Damot against the forces of Emperor Tekle Haymanot II and Ras Mikael Sehul, with the former prevailing. This led to the end of Mikael Sehul's hegemony in imperial politics and the marginalization of Tekle Haymanot. According to James Bruce, the Meridazmach Amha Iyasus led 1,000 horsemen in support of Emperor Tekle Haymanot at Sarbakusa.
