= Debarq =

Town in Amhara Region, Ethiopia

Debarq ደባርቅ
- Town
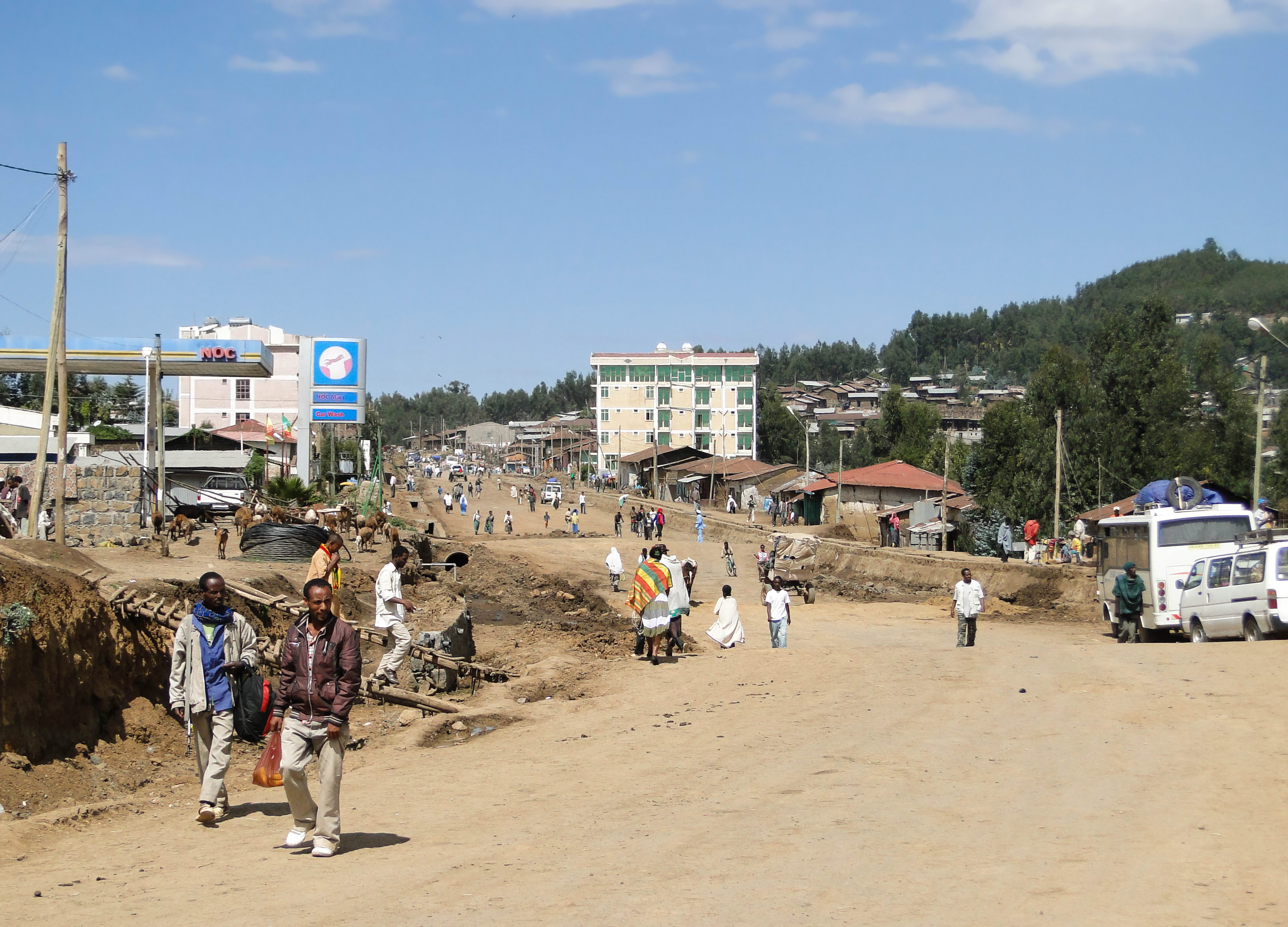
- Main street of Debark

- Location in Ethiopia
- Coordinates: 13°08′N 37°54′E
- Country: Ethiopia
- Region: Amhara
- Zone: North Gondar
- Elevation: 2,850 m (9,350 ft)

Population (2022)
  - Total: 24,700
- Time zone: UTC+3 (EAT)

Debarq (Amharic: ደባርቅ) also spelled Dabareq and Debark, is a town in northern Ethiopia, 90 kilometers north-east of Gondar on the highway between Gondar and Axum, and is in the Semien Gondar Zone of the Amhara Region. It has a latitude and longitude of 13°08′N 37°54′E and an elevation of 2850 meters above sea level.

Debarq is located on the western foothills of the Semien mountains, and nowadays serves as a starting point for hiking tours to the Semien Mountains National Park.

== History ==
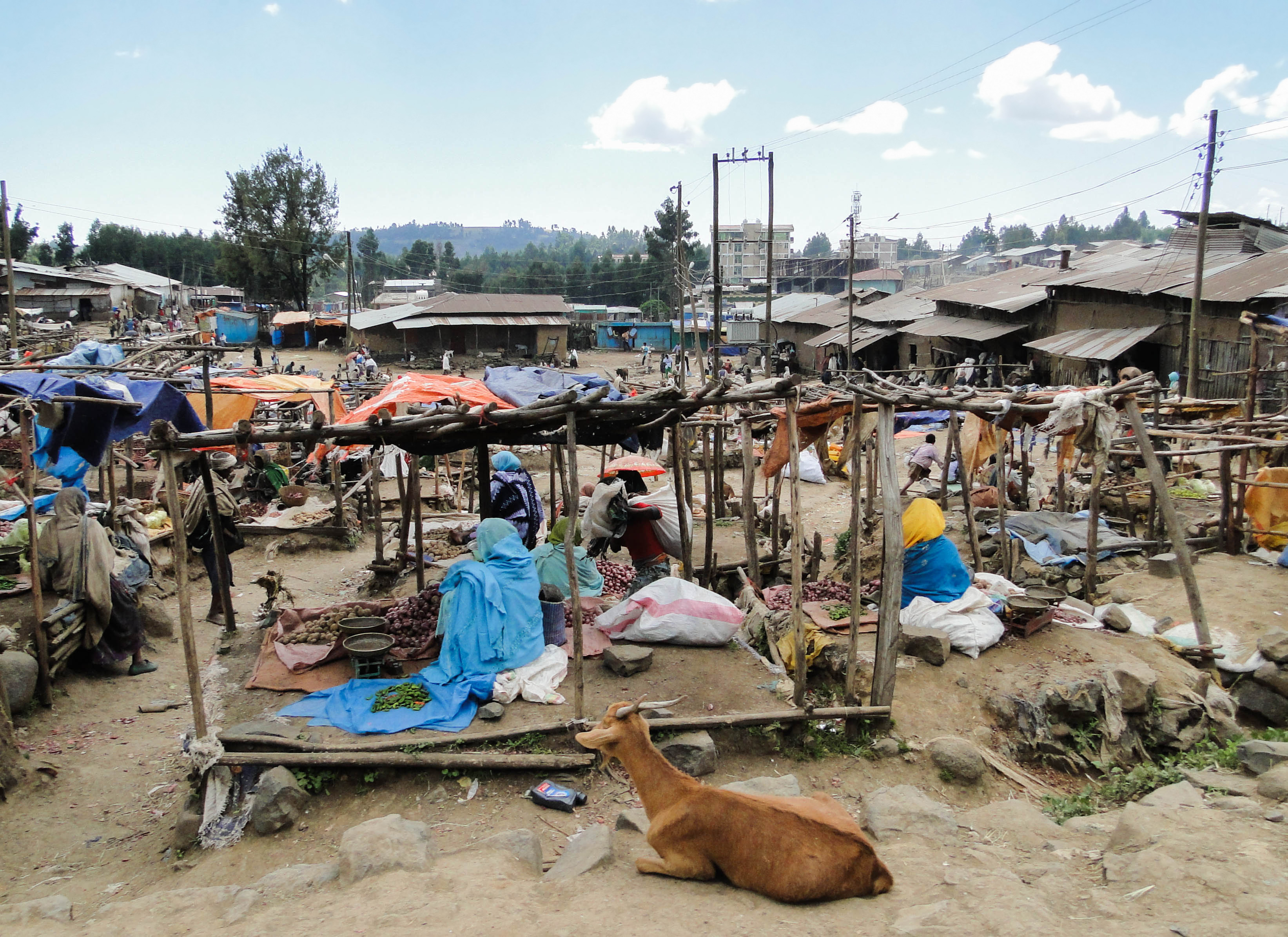
Market in Debarq

=== 17th century ===
The earliest sourced mention of Debarq appears to date back to the late 17th century, serving as a stopover for replenishment to journeys and military campaigns that emperor Iyasu I undertook from Gondar to the north.

=== 18th century ===
In early 1770, explorer James Bruce was one of the earliest foreign sources to mention Debarq. Bruce noted in his journal, the contrasting and temperate climate as he passed through a market in Debarq. (Note: James Bruce spelled Debarq as Dobarke)

Icy winds compete with the blazing sunshine and people with eyes asquint, ruined by sunlight at high altitude, walk for miles to barter on the eroding mountainside. The country about was riddled with hermits and exiles pretending to be hermits, who lived in caves outside the bounds of normal society. The road grew progressively worse as they made their way up the mountain

— James Bruce,

=== 19th century ===
In 1814, Debarq appeared on a map by traveller Henry Salt (Note: On Henry Salt map, Debarq was spelled as Davarik)

Debarq's prosperity was due to its location on the Gondar-Massawa trade route; it is one of the stations on a route of the 1840s, according to a list compiled by Antoine Thomson d'Abbadie in his Geodesie d'Ethiopie. Richard Pankhurst notes that by the early 19th century its market was important enough to be one of six in Ethiopia requiring a nagadras ("head of the market") to oversee it and collect the fees. The revenue from taxes levied on the marketplace in the 1830s paid the governor of Semien province (Wube Haile Maryam) 3,000 Maria Theresa Thalers and about as much to the nagadras.

During a clash with his rebellious nephews, Emperor Tewodros II saw his close friend and advisor John Bell killed in battle here in 1860. Although his nephews were killed in the skirmish, and their 1700 followers immediately surrendered, he exacted vengeance the next day by beheading all of their men.

=== 20th century ===
During Ethiopia's occupation by Fascist Italy, Debarq was the scene of violent fighting between the fascist Italian occupiers and local Ethiopian freedom fighters. After the liberation Debarq became the capital of the Semien Awragga.

During the Ethiopian Civil War, the Tigrayan People's Liberation Front launched an offensive against the Ethiopian Army's 603rd Army Corps of the Derg, and after destroying the government forces stationed at Debarq, they controlled the town 3 January 1989.

== Demographics ==
Based on figures from the Central Statistical Agency, in 2005 Debarq had an estimated total population of 24,997, of whom 11,850 were males and 13,147 were females. The 1994 census reported this town had a total population of 14,474 of whom 6,235 were males and 8,239 were females. It is the largest settlement in Debarq woreda. The majority of the inhabitants practiced Ethiopian Orthodox Christianity, with 84.15% reporting that as their religion, while 11.77% of the population said they were Muslim.

Debarq was reported to have a population of about 8500 in 1984.
