= Qemant people =

Ethnic minority in northwestern Ethiopia

Qemant
ቅማንት

Total population
- Est. 172,000 in 1994 (of whom only 1,650 retain the language.)

Regions with significant populations
- Ethiopia

Languages
- Qemantney; Amharic

Religion
- Ethiopian Orthodox; Higelibona

Related ethnic groups
- Beta Israel, Awi, Bilen, other Agaw people

The Qemant (also known as western Agaws) are a small Cushitic ethnic group in northwestern Ethiopia, specifically in Gondar, Amhara Region. The Qemant people traditionally practiced a syncretic religion with a "Hebraic" (Judaism) core; however, most members of the Qemant are followers of the Ethiopian Orthodox Church. They are historically related to, but distinct from, the Beta Israel community.

== Population and demographics ==
The ethnicity's population is reported to be 172,000, according to the 1994 national census; the latest available national census, the one performed in 2007, does not list them as a separate group. However, only 1,625 people still speak Qimant, and it is considered endangered, as most children speak Amharic; likewise, adherence to the traditional religion has dropped substantially, as most of the population has converted to Christianity. Converts often consider themselves to be Amharas.

== Geographic distribution ==
The Qemant live in an area traditionally called Qwara, along an axis stretching from Ayikel in Chilga woreda to Kirakir and north to Lake Tana in the woredas of Lay Armachiho. Most remaining speakers of the language are near Ayikel, about 40 miles (64 km) west of Gondar. They are mainly farmers.

== Social organization ==
The Qemant are divided into two patrilineal moieties, Kɨbbɨr and Yetanti; the Kɨbbɨr moiety is higher in rank. A traditional Qemant can only marry a member of the other moiety, so, while the moieties are exogamous, Qemant society as a whole is endogamous.

== Religion ==
The Qemant traditionally practiced a religion which is often described as "Hebraic" . According to the American anthropologist Frederic C. Gamst, their "Hebraism is an ancient form and unaffected by Hebraic change of the past two millennia". A recent sociolinguistic survey notes that the Qemant religion is in a very precarious situation since very few people still adhere to it due to rapid assimilation. According to this study, the respective proportions of Qemant people who follow the Qemant religion and who are baptized and converted to Ethiopian Orthodox Christianity are about 1% and 99%.

Qemant religious observance includes a literal reading of the 11th chapter of Leviticus (see kashrut). As with Rabbinic Judaism, even permitted animals can only be consumed if they are properly slaughtered. Qemant practices include animal sacrifices and the tending of sacred groves called degegna. Worship is conducted outdoors, usually at a site near a sacred tree called a k'ole, wrapped in variously-colored strips of cloth. This appears to be a survival of a biblical tradition: "Abraham planted a grove in Beersheba, and called there the name of God" (Genesis 21:33) and "where the women wove hangings for the grove" (II Kings 23:7). However, due to their dislike to being observed by the increasingly pervasive Christians, they eventually constructed a prayer-hall at Chelga. They also practiced levirate marriage, similar to the Jewish practice of yibbum.

Shabbat is observed on Saturday, when it is forbidden to light a fire. The extent to which they observe the rabbinically prohibited activities of Shabbat or the traditional Shabbat prohibitions of the Beta Israel is unclear.

The Qemant call God Yïdära, or Mïzgänä, which might be a proper name. He is described within the religion as omnipresent, omnipotent, omniscient, and anthropomorphic. He is approachable directly or through figures called in Amharic k'edus "holy ones", which are angels or culture heroes.

The highest political and religious leader among the Qemant is called the womber, an Amharic term meaning "chair". There were formerly two superior wombers, at Karkar and at Chelga, with the first being senior, and a varying number of subordinate wombers in other parts of Qemantland. All wombers are chosen from certain lineages in the Kïbbïr moiety. The last womber of Karkar died in 1955, and since then the only womber has been Mulunah Marsha, womber of Chelga (born 1935). Each womber chose from the kïbbïr moiety one or more delegates with the Amharic title afa liq "mouth of the master" to represent him in judicial matters. These men traveled the countryside, settling disputes, seeing that the laws were obeyed, and punishing wrongdoing, usually with a fine. Each womber also chose two stewards with different titles, one from each moiety, who served different elements of the sacred meals.

There are two orders of priesthood: the kamazana, the higher, of the Kïbbïr moiety, and the abayegariya, the lower, of the Yetanti moiety. Each Qemant locality has at least one of each; they must work together to conduct the traditional sacrifices and other religious ceremonies. When offering a sacrifice, the abayegaria holds the legs of the victim and the kamazana wields the knife. The priests also have a subordinate judicial function.

== History ==
Due to lack of written evidences, for some scholars, the origin of the Qemant is obscure. However, according to the Qemant tradition and history, everything started when Noah's Ark settled at the top of Mount Ararat also believed to be Mount Guna which is located in northern Amhara region. The meaning of "guna" in Qemant language is "starting point". Qemants are descended from Yaner (also called Ayaner). He is "the grandson of Canaan, the fourth son of Ham, son of Noah." Noah and his family lived there for a few years but Shem and Japheth moved to Asia and the Middle East; however Noah and his son Ham stayed in Ethiopia until his death. Noah was buried in present-day Fasil Ghebbi and his wife Aykel was buried in Aykel city, named after her. However according to some legends, Canaan’s son, Arwadi, came to Ethiopia from the land of Canaan to found the Qemant group, whereas in other legends it is Arwadi’s son, Yaner, who did so.

According to the early 19th century missionary Samuel Gobat, their neighbours considered the Qemant boudas, or sorcerers, along with "the Falashas or Jews (Beta Israel), most Mussulmans (Muslims), and some Christians." Gobat knew little more about this "small Pagan people inhabiting the mountains in the vicinity of Gondar."

Writing in 1967, US anthropologist F. Gamst said he expected total assimilation of the Qemant with the Amhara within three decades. However in the modern era, Qemant identity has resurfaced.

Today, most ethnic Qemants overwhelmingly identify as Amharas, and Qemant was removed as an identity from Ethiopia’s 2007 national census, but there are some Qemant communities who are still attempting to preserve their culture and language.

== See also ==
- Beta Israel
- Jews and Judaism in Africa
