= North Gondar Zone =

Zone in Amhara Region of Ethiopia

Coordinates: 12°45′N 37°00′E

North Gondar ሰሜን ጎንደር Semien Gondar
- Zone
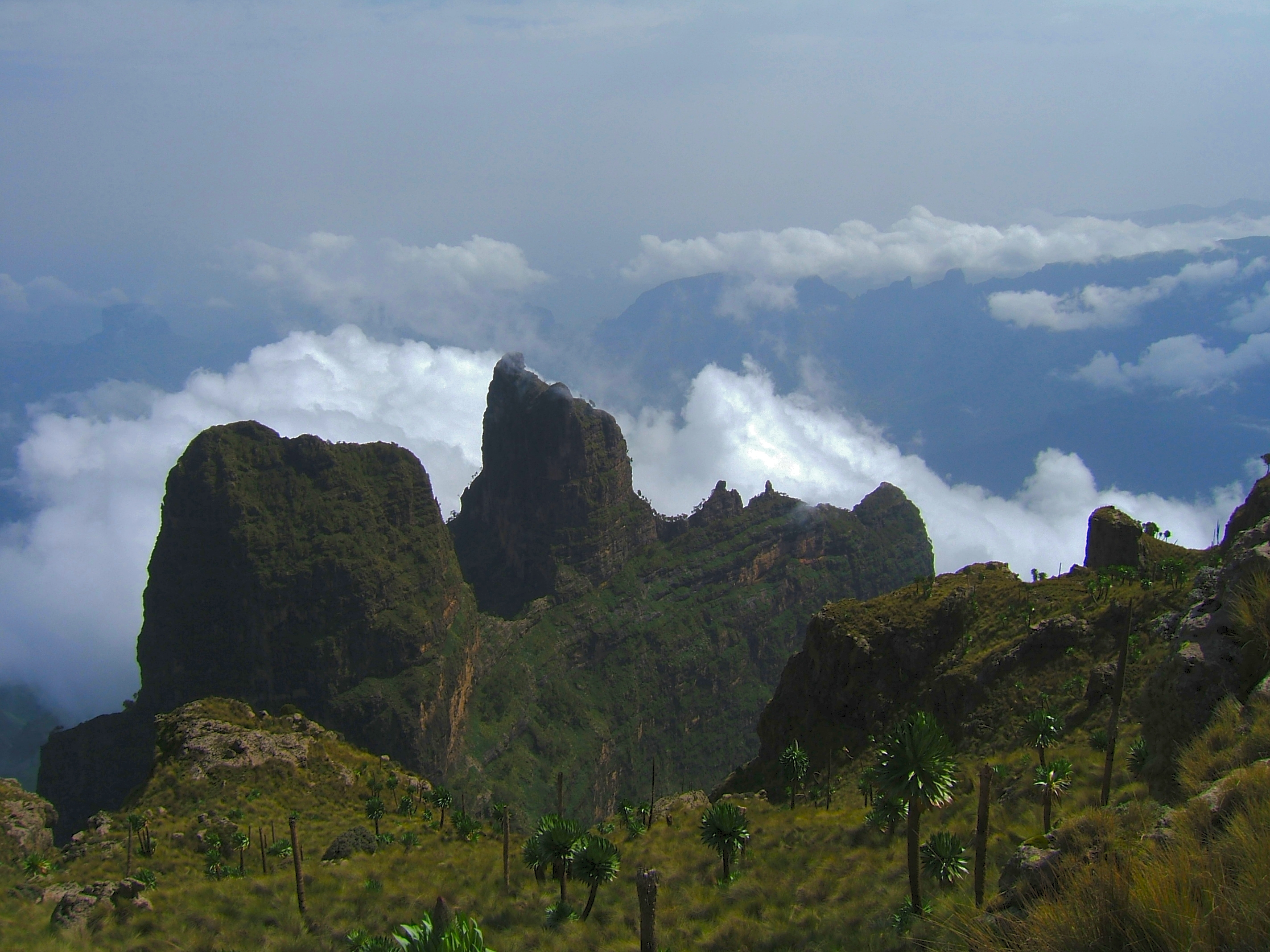
- Interactive map of North Gondar
- Country: Ethiopia
- Region: Amhara
- Largest city: Gondar

Area
  - Total: 45,944.63 km^{2} (17,739.32 sq mi)

Population (2012)
  - Total: 3,225,002
  - Density: 70.19/km^{2} (181.8/sq mi)

Map of the regions and zones of Ethiopia

North Gondar (Amharic: ሰሜን ጎንደር; or Central Gondar) also known as Semien Gondar is one of the Zones in the Amhara Region of Ethiopia. This zone is named for the city of Gondar, the capital of Ethiopia until the mid-19th century.

== Geography ==
North Gondar is bordered on the south by Central Gondar Zone, on the north by the Tigray Region, and on the east by Wag Hemra. Towns and cities in North Gondar include Arbaya, Dabat, Dembiya, Debark, Emfranz, Feres Megria, Musebamb Town, Kurbi, Armachiho, Gondar, Tekeldengy, Gorgora and Metemma.

== Demographics ==
A 2012 census puts the population at 3,225,002. This gives a population density of 70.19 people per square kilometer (181.80 people per square mile), given its area of 45,944.63 square kilometers (17,739.32 square miles).

Based on the 2007 Census conducted by the Central Statistical Agency of Ethiopia (CSA), North Gondar Zone had a total population of 2,929,628, an increase of 40.26% over the 1994 census, of whom 1,486,040 are men and 1,443,588 women; with an area of 45,944.63 square kilometers, North Gondar had a population density of 63.76 people per square kilometer (165.15 people per square mile). While 462,700 or 15.79% are urban inhabitants, a further 2,148 or 0.07% are pastoralists. A total of 654,803 households were counted in this zone, which results in an average of 4.47 persons to a household, and 631,509 housing units.

The main ethnic group reported in North Gondar was the Amhara (97.84%); all other ethnic groups made up 2.16% of the population. Amharic was spoken as a first language by 98.32%; the remaining 1.62% spoke all other primary languages reported. 95.38% practiced Ethiopian Orthodox Christianity, and 4.29% of the population said they were Muslim.

The 1994 national census reported a total population for this zone of 2,088,684 in 434,297 households, of whom 1,059,698 were men and 1,028,986 women; 236,625 or 11.33% of its population were urban dwellers at the time. The three largest ethnic groups reported in North Gondar were the Amhara (89.72%), the Qemant (8.25%), and the Tigrayan (0.94%); all other ethnic groups made up 1.09% of the population. Amharic was spoken as a first language by 98.24%, and 0.81% spoke Tigrinya; the remaining 0.95% spoke all other primary languages reported. 95.32% practiced Ethiopian Orthodox Christianity, and 4.54% of the population said they were Muslim.

According to a May 24, 2004 World Bank memorandum, 7% of the inhabitants of North Gondar have access to electricity, this zone has a road density of 21.2 kilometers per 1000 square kilometers (compared to the national average of 30 kilometers), the average rural household has 1.2 hectares of land (compared to the national average of 1.01 hectare of land and an average of 0.75 for the Amhara Region) and the equivalent of 0.8 heads of livestock. 24.6% of the population is in non-farm related jobs, compared to the national average of 25% and a Regional average of 21%. 50% of all eligible children are enrolled in primary school, and 13% in secondary schools. 62% of the zone is exposed to malaria, and none to tsetse fly. The memorandum gave this zone a drought risk rating of 506.

== See also ==
- Alitash National Park
