= Banja (woreda) =

Coordinates: 11°10′N 36°15′E

Banja (Amharic: ባንጃ) was one of the 105 woredas in the Amhara Region of Ethiopia. It was named after a significant mountain located in the woreda, Mount Banja, where Fasil crushed a revolt of the Agaw in the late 18th century. Part of the Agew Awi Zone, Banja was bordered on the south by Ankesha, on the west by Guangua, on the north by Faggeta Lekoma, and on the east by the Mirab Gojjam Zone. Towns in Banja included Injibara, Kessa, Kosober and Tilili. Other high points included Mount Faddi. Bodies of water in this woreda included the Zengena crater lake. Banja was separated for Banja Shekudad and Guagusa Shekudad woredas.

The woreda administration announced that by 22 March 2009, Banja had achieved 100% coverage of sanitation facilities, an increase from 0.03% in the 1990s, and 61% as recently as 2005. Through an innovative program which focussed on education of every resident of the woreda, the local Health Desk was able to convince the inhabitants of all 26 kebeles to construct enough latrines to ensure each household was no further than 6 meters from a latrine, as well as building one common latrine in every village. In addition, there are now public latrines for passers-by and boys who stay and sleep in the field herding cattle and sheep. However, only 28% of inhabitants currently have access to safe water.

== Demographics ==
Based on figures published by the Central Statistical Agency in 2005, this woreda has an estimated total population of 208,428, of whom 105,491 are men and 102,937 are women; 17,074 or 8.19% of its population are urban dwellers, which is less than the Zone average of 11.4%. With an estimated area of 832.51 square kilometers, Banja has an estimated population density of 250.4 people per square kilometer, which is greater than the Zone average of 155.7.

The 1994 national census reported a total population for this woreda of 151,950 in 28,557 households, of whom 75,645 were men and 76,305 were women; 9,866 or 6.49% of its population were urban dwellers. The two largest ethnic groups reported in Banja were the Amhara (56.58%), and the Awi (43.27%) one of the Agaw peoples; all other ethnic groups made up 0.15% of the population. Amharic was spoken as a first language by 66.19%, and 33.77% spoke Awngi; the remaining 0.36% spoke all other primary languages reported. The majority of the inhabitants practiced Ethiopian Orthodox Christianity, with 99.87% reporting that as their religion.
