= Dangila (woreda) =

District in Amhara Region, Ethiopia

Coordinates: 11°25′N 36°40′E

Dangila ዳንግላ
- Woreda
- Flag
- Interactive map of Dangila
- Zone: Agew Awi
- Region: Amhara

Area
  - Total: 918.40 km^{2} (354.60 sq mi)

Population (2012 est.)
  - Total: 174,981
  - Density: 190.53/km^{2} (493.47/sq mi)

Dangila (Amharic: ዳንግላ) is one of the woredas in the Amhara Region of Ethiopia. This woreda is named after the former district, Dangila, which James Bruce notes was in his day known for its breed of sheep. Part of the Agew Awi Zone, Dangila is bordered on the south by Faggeta Lekoma, on the southwest by Guangua, on the northwest by the Jawi, and on the northeast by the Mirab Gojjam Zone. Towns in Dangila include Addis Alem, Dangila and Dek. Part of the Dangila was separated to create Jawi woreda.

Dangila was selected by the Ministry of Agriculture and Rural Development as an area for voluntary resettlement for farmers from overpopulated areas. Along with Lay Armachiho and Qwara in the Amhara Region, and Tsegede in the Tigray Region, became the new homes of 8,671 families. This was reportedly accompanied with almost 68 million Birr in infrastructure development.

== Demographics ==
A 2012 estimate puts the population at 174,981. With an area of 918.40 square kilometers (354.60 square miles), Dangila has a population density of 190.53 people per square kilometer (493.47 people per square mile), which is greater than the Agew Awi Zone average of 117.74 people per square kilometer (304.95 people per square mile).

Based on the 2007 national census conducted by the Central Statistical Agency of Ethiopia (CSA), this woreda has a total population of 158,688, an increase of 6.44% over the 1994 census, of whom 80,235 are men and 78,453 women; 27,001 or 17.02% are urban inhabitants. A total of 35,610 households were counted in this woreda, resulting in an average of 4.46 persons to a household, and 34,635 housing units.

The majority of the inhabitants practiced Ethiopian Orthodox Christianity, with 97.9% reporting that as their religion, and 1.88% of the population said they were Muslim.

The 1994 national census reported a total population for this woreda of 149,091 in 25,994 households, of whom 74,486 were men and 74,605 were women; 18,301 or 12.28% of its population were urban dwellers. The two largest ethnic groups reported in Dangila were the Amhara (78.65%), and the Awi (21.13%), one of the Agaw peoples; all other ethnic groups made up 0.22% of the population. Amharic was spoken as a first language by 83.24%, and 16.65% spoke Awngi; the remaining 0.11% spoke all other primary languages reported. The majority of the inhabitants practiced Ethiopian Orthodox Christianity, with 97.1% reporting that as their religion, while 2.74% were Muslim.
