= Ankasha Guagusa =

Coordinates: 11°00′N 36°40′E

Ankasha Guagusa አንከሻ ጓጉሳ
- Woreda
- Flag
- Interactive map of Ankasha Guagusa
- Zone: Agew Awi
- Region: Amhara Region

Area
  - Total: 1,044.21 km^{2} (403.17 sq mi)

Population (2012 est.)
  - Total: 217,665
  - Density: 208.449/km^{2} (539.882/sq mi)

Ankasha Guagusa (Amharic: አንከሻ ጓጉሳ) is one of the woredas in the Amhara Region of Ethiopia. The woreda is named after a former confederation of the Agew, which James Bruce describes was formed of Dengui, Sakala, Dengila and Geesh. A triangle-shaped district in the Agew Awi Zone, Ankasha Guagusa is bordered on the south by the Mirab Gojjam Zone, on the west by Guangua, on the north by Banja Shekudad, and on the east by Guagusa Shekudad. Towns in Ankasha Guagusa include Agew Gimjabet and Azena.

== Overview ==
About 4,760 farmers engaged in apiary earned over three million Birr from the sale of over 1,400 quintals of honey harvested during the summer and main crop season of 2008. The amount of harvested honey has increased with the use of modern beehives.

In March 2009, the woreda Water Resource Development Office announced that construction of over 100 safe water facilities was underway at 11 localities in Ankesha. This involved sinking of wells and modifying springs, and would benefit 28,000 residents. The four million Birr these projects cost was provided by the government of Finland and UNICEF.

== Demographics ==
A 2012 estimate puts the population at 217,665. This gives a population density of 208.45 people per square kilometer (539.88 people per square mile), given its area of 1,044.21 square kilometers (403.17 square miles), higher than the Agew Awi Zone average of 117.74 people per square kilometer (304.95 people per square mile).

Based on the 2007 national census conducted by the Central Statistical Agency of Ethiopia (CSA), this woreda has a total population of 199,826, of whom 99,285 are men and 100,541 women; 16,380 or 8.2% are urban inhabitants.

The majority of the inhabitants practiced Ethiopian Orthodox Christianity, with 97.54% reporting that as their religion, and 2.34% of the population said they were Muslim.

The 1994 national census reported a total population for this woreda of 170,974 in 34,553 households, of whom 84,893 were men and 86,081 were women; 7,767 or 4.54% of its population were urban dwellers. The two largest ethnic groups reported in Ankesha were the Awi (71.28%) one of the Agaw peoples, and the Amhara (28.32%); all other ethnic groups made up 0.4% of the population. Awngi was spoken as a first language by 69.04%, and 30.6% spoke Amharic; the remaining 0.36% spoke all other primary languages reported. The majority of the inhabitants practiced Ethiopian Orthodox Christianity, with 97.74% reporting that as their religion, while 2.16% were Muslim.
