= Faggeta Lekoma =

District in Amhara Region, Ethiopia

Coordinates: 11°20′N 36°45′E

Faggeta Lekoma ፋግታ ለኮማ
- Woreda
- Flag
- Interactive map of Faggeta Lekoma
- Zone: Agew Awi
- Region: Amhara

Area
  - Total: 653.39 km^{2} (252.28 sq mi)

Population (2012 est.)
  - Total: 137,428
  - Density: 210.33/km^{2} (544.75/sq mi)

Faggeta Lekoma (Amharic: ፋግታ ለኮማ), also spelled Fagita Lekoma, is a woreda in Amhara Region, Ethiopia. The woreda is named in part after two former districts: Faggeta and Lekoma, where Emperor Susenyos quashed a revolt of the local Agaw in 1614. Part of the Agew Awi Zone, Faggeta Lekoma is bordered on the south by Banja Shekudad, on the west by Guangua, on the north by Dangila, and on the east by the Mirab Gojjam Zone. Towns in Faggeta Lekoma include Addis Kidame and Faggeta.

== Demographics ==
A 2012 estimate puts the population at 137,428. With an area of 653.39 square kilometers (252.28 square miles), Faggeta Lekoma has a population density of 210.33 people per square kilometer (544.75 people per square mile), which is greater than the Agew Awi Zone average of 107.44 people per square kilometer (500.90 people per square mile).

Based on the 2007 national census conducted by the Central Statistical Agency of Ethiopia (CSA), this woreda has a total population of 126,367, an increase of 29.68% over the 1994 census, of whom 62,728 are men and 63,639 women; 8,906 or 7.05% are urban inhabitants. A total of 26,774 households were counted in this woreda, resulting in an average of 4.72 persons to a household, and 26,180 housing units.

The majority of the inhabitants practiced Ethiopian Orthodox Christianity, with 99.9% reporting that as their religion.

The 1994 national census reported a total population for this woreda of 97,446 in 18,679 households, of whom 48,678 were men and 48,768 were women; 4,501 or 4.62% of its population were urban dwellers. The two largest ethnic groups reported in Faggeta Lekoma were the Amhara (51.03%), and the Awi (48.89%) one of the Agaw peoples; all other ethnic groups made up 0.08% of the population. Amharic was spoken as a first language by 61.52%, and 38.44% spoke Awngi; the remaining 0.04% spoke all other primary languages reported. The majority of the inhabitants practiced Ethiopian Orthodox Christianity, with 99.86% reporting that as their religion.
