= Banja Shekudad =

District in Amhara Region, Ethiopia

- Woreda
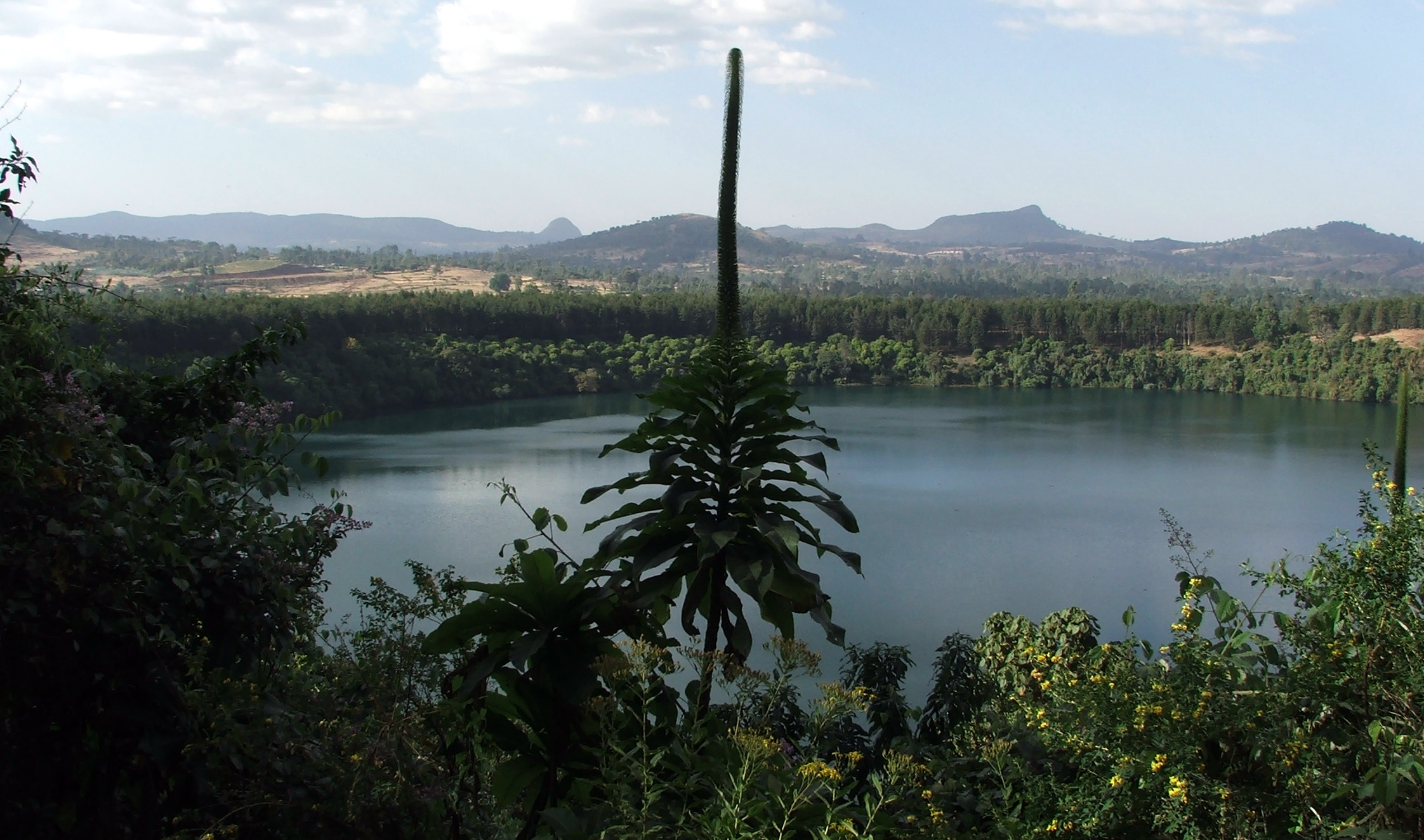

- Flag
- Zone: Agew Awi
- Region: Amhara

Area
  - Total: 508.05 km^{2} (196.16 sq mi)

Population (2012 est.)
  - Total: 123,992
  - Density: 244.05/km^{2} (632.10/sq mi)

Banja Shekudad is a woreda in Amhara Region, Ethiopia. It is named after a significant mountain located in the woreda, Mount Banja, where Fasil crushed a revolt of the Agaw in the late 18th century. Part of the Agew Awi Zone, Banja Shekudad is bordered on the south by Ankasha Guagusa, on the west by Guangua, on the north by Faggeta Lekoma, on the east by the Mirab Gojjam Zone, and on the southeast by Guagusa Shekudad. Towns in Banja Shekudad include Injibara and Kessa. Bodies of water in this woreda include the Zengena crater lake. Banja Shekudad was part of former Banja woredas.

== Demographics ==
A 2012 estimate puts the population at 123,992. This gives a population density of 244.05 people per square kilometer (632.10 people per square mile), given its area of 508.05 square kilometers (196.16 square miles), higher than the Agew Awi Zone average of 117.74 people per square kilometer (304.95 people per square mile).

Based on the 2007 national census conducted by the Central Statistical Agency of Ethiopia (CSA), this woreda has a total population of 111,975, of whom 55,611 are men and 56,364 women; 22,473 or 20.07% are urban inhabitants.

The majority of the inhabitants practiced Ethiopian Orthodox Christianity, with 99.45% reporting that as their religion.
