= Bole2Harlem =

American hip hop group

- Origin: Harlem, New York City
- Genres: Hip-hop, Ethiopian music
- Years active: 2005–2006
- Past members: David "Duke Mushroom" Schommer; Tigist Shibabaw; Maki Siraj; Davi Vieira; Dave Eggar; Henok Temesgen; Balla Tounkara; Sam "Carpete" Effron; Gregg Fine; Khalid M'Zouz
- Website: web.archive.org/web/20071121213356/http://www.bole2harlem.com/home.html

Bole2Harlem was a musical collaboration that fused elements of Ethiopian music with American hip hop. Bole2Harlem released one album, Bole2Harlem, Volume 1, in 2006. David "Duke Mushroom" Schommer, a producer, songwriter, and percussionist, founded the group with Ethiopian singers Tigist Shibabaw (the late sister of singer Gigi) and Maki Siraj. The project's name refers to Bole, a neighborhood in Addis Ababa (and the site of Bole International Airport), and Harlem, New York City, where Schommer and Siraj were residents.

== History ==
The project has its roots in L'Orange Bleue, a New York cafe popular with African expatriates and where Schommer, Siraj, and Shibabaw would congregate. Schommer had grown up immersed in Ethiopian culture: his father had helped establish a university in Ethiopia, and consequently the family home was filled with Ethiopian art and stories. Shibabaw and Siraj had made a recording after they met in 2005. Schommer, Shibabaw, and Siraj discussed an "Abesha MC" concept, with Shibabaw representing traditional Ethiopian styles (see Ethiopiques), and Siraj representing new musical trends. Additional collaborators joined after hearing about the project through Schommer's other production activities. Schommer and Siraj also trace the concept to the transit culture of Addis Ababa, where weyalas rapidly call out the destinations of share taxis (for example, "Bole, Bole, Bole, Bole..."). Schommer describes the idea of taking a New York taxicab and suddenly placing it and its passengers in Addis Ababa (thus, "Harlem, Harlem, Harlem, Harlem..."). The album cover art features a minibus similar to the vehicles used as share taxis. Tigist Shibabaw died in early 2008 in Bahar Dar, Ethiopia.

== Discography ==
=== Bole2Harlem, Volume 1 ===
(Duke Mushroom Presents) Bole2Harlem, Volume 1

Studio album by Bole2Harlem
- Released: 2006
- Recorded: Sounds of the Mushroom, Harlem; MacSound, New York City
- Genre: Hip hop, Ethiopian music
- Length: 58:15
- Label: Sounds of the Mushroom
- Producer: Duke Mushroom

Sounds of the Mushroom released Bole2Harlem, Volume 1 in June 2006. White Swan Records reissued the album in June 2011.

According to Schommer, the track "Hoya Hoye" exemplifies the crossing of Ethiopian and American cultures. He explains how the title is derived from a Halloween-like celebration, in which children chant "Hoya, hoye, HO, hoya hoye, HO" while clapping and pounding sticks (see Buhe). After hearing this chant sung in Addis Ababa, Schommer was further inspired by the beat of a hip-hop track he heard while walking through Harlem. During this same walk, he also heard a Gospel choir singing as he passed a church, and decided to add the refrain ("Feeling all right!") to the song. The blues scale heard on the song is actually an abbreviated Ethiopian scale.

The track "Bole 2 Harlem" appears on the compilation album Un Automne 2007.

Track listing

1. "Bole 2 Harlem" - 4:12
2. "Hoya Hoye" - 4:08
3. "Enseralen" Gojo - 5:27
4. "Ametballe" - 4:56
5. "Hi Loga" - 4:19
6. "Endegena" - 4:47
7. "Home" - 5:55
8. "Ya Selam" - 3:54
9. "Aya Bellew" - 4:41
10. "Harlem 2 Bole" - 2:28
11. "Quralew" - 1:47
12. "Ensaralen Gojo (Remix)" - 8:58
13. "Africaye!" - 2:28

All Songs Written by:

- D. Schommer: Music
- M.Siraj, T.Shibabaw, D.Schommer: Lyrics

Except:

- #4, 11: D. Schommer: Music, M.Siraj: Lyric
- #3, 12:D. Schommer: Music, J.Bashir, M.Siraj: Lyric
- #6: D. Schommer: Music, M.Siraj, D.Vieira: Lyric

Personnel

- David "Duke Mushroom" Schommer - Vocals, drums, percussion, beats, bass, keyboards
- Tigist Shibabaw - vocals
- Maki Siraj - vocals
- Fray - vocals, track 4
- Davi Vieira - vocals, percussion, track 5
- Dave Eggar - cello, #3
- Henok Temesgen - electric bass, tracks 4–5
- Robert Aaron - horns, tracks 2, 4, 6, 7, 13
- Joewarn Martin - keyboards, tracks 2–7
- Balla Tounkara - kora, vocals, track 10
- Sam "Carpete" Effron - guitar, tracks 1–3
- Gregg Fine - guitar, track 7
- Khalid M'Zouz - hand clapping, tracks 1–2, 7–10

=== Contributing artist ===
- The Rough Guide to the Music of Ethiopia (2012, World Music Network)
