= Guangua =

District in Amhara Region, Ethiopia

Guangua ጓንጓ
- Woreda
- Flag

- Location within Ethiopia
- Coordinates: 11°00′N 36°20′E
- Zone: Agew Awi
- Region: Amhara

Area
  - Total: 2,305.44 km^{2} (890.14 sq mi)

Population (2012 est.)
  - Total: 244,987
  - Density: 106.265/km^{2} (275.224/sq mi)

Guangua (Amharic: ጓንጓ) is one of the woredas in the Amhara Region of Ethiopia. Part of the Agew Awi Zone, Guangua is bordered on the south and west by the Benishangul-Gumuz Region, on the north by Dangila, on the northwest by Faggeta Lekoma and Banja Shekudad, and on the east by Ankasha Guagusa; the Dura River, a tributary of the Abay River, defines part of its western border. The administrative center of this woreda is Chagni; other towns in Guangua include Kilaj, and Menta Wuha.

== Overview ==
High points in this woreda include Mount Gum (1506 meters), which R E Cheesman described as a prominent landmark near the Zakas ford on the Abay. MIDROC Gold reported in 2009 that it was exploring the area around Menta Wuha for gold deposits.

Originally the two adjacent woredas in the Benishangul-Gumuz Region, Dibate and Mandura, were subunits of Guangua but in the 1960s were split off to form separate woredas in order to strengthen government control over the local Gumuz people. These two woredas were transferred to Benishangul-Gumuz when that region was organized in the 1992.

== Demographics ==
A 2012 estimate puts the population at 244,987. With an area of 2,305.44 square kilometers (890.14 square miles), Guangua has a population density of 106.27 people per square kilometer (275.22 people per square mile), which is less than the Agew Awi Zone average of 107.44 people per square kilometer (278.56 people per square mile).

Based on the 2007 national census conducted by the Central Statistical Agency of Ethiopia (CSA), this woreda has a total population of 223,066, an increase of 51.10% over the 1994 census, of whom 111,172 are men and 111,894 women; 31,489 or 14.12% are urban inhabitants. A total of 47,759 households were counted in this woreda, resulting in an average of 4.67 persons to a household, and 46,471 housing units.

The majority of the inhabitants practiced Ethiopian Orthodox Christianity, with 81.81% reporting that as their religion, 14.59% of the population said they were Muslim, and 1.64% practiced traditional beliefs.

The 1994 national census reported a total population for this woreda of 170,974 in 34,553 households, of whom 84,893 were men and 86,081 were women; 7,767 or 4.54% of its population were urban dwellers. The three largest ethnic groups reported in Guangua were the Awi (62.02%) one of the Agaw peoples, the Amhara (31.93%), and the Gumuz (4.55%); all other ethnic groups made up 1.5% of the population. Awngi was spoken as a first language by 61.33%, 32.83% Amharic, and 4.55% spoke Gumuz; the remaining 1.29% spoke all other primary languages reported. The majority of the inhabitants practiced Ethiopian Orthodox Christianity, with 74.3% reporting that as their religion, while 20.98% were Muslim, and 0.77% observed traditional religions.
