= Mengesha Jembere =

Ethiopian military commander (1884–1950)

Dejazmach Mengesha Jembere መንገሻ ጀምበሬ
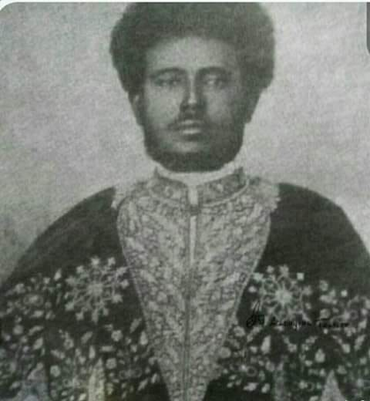

Personal details
- Born: 24 May 1884 Gojjam, Ethiopian Empire
- Died: 15 August 1950 (aged 66) Bahir Dar, Ethiopian Empire

Military service
- Allegiance: Ethiopian Empire
- Unit: Arbegnoch
- Battles/wars: Second Italo-Ethiopian War; World War II

Dejazmach Mengesha Jembere (Amharic: መንገሻ ጀምበሬ; 24 May 1884 – 15 August 1950) was a leader of the Patriot movement (Arbegnoch) during the Italian occupation of Ethiopia. He fought in the Second Italo-Ethiopian War in 1936 before becoming a resistance leader in his native province of Gojjam. After the liberation of Ethiopia, he became the deputy governor of Gojjam.

== Early life ==
Mengesha Jembere was born on 13 May 1884, in the province of Gojjam to a family of provincial nobility. His father, Jembere Emru, was the local leader of the Mecha, Densa, Guta, and Agew provinces. His grandfather, Ras Mengesha Atikem, was one of the commanders at the Battle of Adwa and the governor of Agawmeder. Before the Italian invasion in 1935, he became a Dejazmach and a governor of various smaller provinces in Gojjam. He was married to Sabla Wangel Hailu, daughter of Ras Hailu Tekle Haymanot.

== Resistance against the Italians ==
During the Second Italo-Ethiopian War, Dejazmach Mengesha led a contingent of warriors from Gojjam at the Battle of Shire, which was virtually annihilated. Following this, he retreated back to his homeland of northern Gojjam, where he began to organize a resistance against the Italian occupation. Mengesha mobilized an army of around 5,000 brigands and harassed Italian units in Gojjam from mid to late 1937.

Following the defeat of Hailu Kebede's revolt in Lasta in September 1937, the Italians attempted to pacify the Amhara Governorate by launching an offensive against the guerrillas in Gojjam. The new offensive immediately began with a disaster when on 7 December 1937, the VI Arab-Somali battalion led by Pietro Grosso was attacked and completely destroyed by the guerrillas of Mengesha Jembere. Despite this setback, the new viceroy, Prince Amedeo, Duke of Aosta, was eager to crush the guerrillas before the rainy season began. The new cycle of counterinsurgency operations began on 19 January 1938 in Gojjam, which was attacked from the north and south by three separate columns while other forces blocked the fords on the Blue Nile to prevent the guerrillas from escaping.

From January to March, there were fierce battles in Gojjam between the Italians and the guerrillas of Mengesha and Belay Zeleke, with heavy losses for both sides. The Italians lost 350 dead and 1,200 wounded, the majority of whom were askaris but also included Italian officers such as Giovanni Thun Hohenstein, Nicola Tagliaferri and Oreste Bernardini. Despite these heavy losses, these clashes ended in March 1938 with the dispersal of Mengesha, who lost nearly half his men.

Mengesha managed to avoid death or capture during the roundups despite a serious lack of food and ammunition. However, he seemed relatively optimistic, and in August 1938, he wrote a letter to Haile Selassie, pledging his allegiance to the Emperor and vowing to expel the Italians from Ethiopia. From the summer of 1938 to the spring of 1940, Mengesha's activities caused great frustration to the Italian garrison in Debre Markos, and he was considered to be one of the most active and dangerous guerrilla leaders in Italian East Africa.

After the outbreak of the Second World War, Mengesha established contact with the British forces in Sudan, who gave him a consistent supply of weapons and ammunition. During the East African campaign, Mengesha's guerrillas accompanied the Gideon Force during their advance into Italian East Africa, seizing the town of Dangila before the arrival of British forces and helping them take Debre Markos on 6 April 1941.

== Later career ==
After the Liberation of Ethiopia in 1941, Emperor Haile Selassie appointed Mengesha Jembere as the governor of Metekel, Agawmeder, and Bahir Dar. In 1943, he became the deputy governor of Gojjam and was granted the title of Balambaras. After briefly serving in the Imperial Parliament of Ethiopia, he was appointed governor of Welega Province in 1946 before stepping down in 1949. He died in 1950.
