= Kayla dialect =

Agaw language of Beta Israel of Ethiopia

Kayla
- Kayliñña
- Native to: Ethiopia
- Region: Amhara Region, Tigray Region
- Extinct: (date missing)
- Language family: Afro-Asiatic: Cushitic; Agaw; Northern; Xamtanga; Kayla

Language codes
- ISO 639-3: –
- Glottolog: kayl1240

Kayliñña (Tigrinya and Amharic: ካይልኛ, romanized: kāyliññā) is one of two Agaw languages formerly spoken by a subgroup of the Beta Israel (Ethiopian Jews). It is a transitional dialect between Qimant and Xamtanga. The name Kayla (ካይላ) is sometimes also used as a cover term for both Beta Israel dialects. It is known only from unpublished notes by Jacques Faitlovitch written in the Ge'ez script, recently studied by David Appleyard. It is preserved by the Beta Israel today.

== See also ==
- Qwara dialect

== Bibliography ==
- Appleyard, David (1996), "Kaïliña – a 'new' Agaw dialect and its implications for Agaw dialectology", in Hayward, R.J.; Lewis, I. (eds.), Voice and Power: The Culture of Language in North-East Africa, London: SOAS, pp. 1–19, ISBN 0-7286-0257-1
- David Appleyard, "Preparing a Comparative Agaw Dictionary", in ed. Griefenow-Mewis & Voigt, Cushitic & Omotic Languages: Proceedings of the 3rd International Symposium Berlin, Mar. 17-19, 1994, Rüdiger Köppe Verlag, Köln 1996. ISBN 3-927620-28-9.
