= Shibabaw =

Shibabaw is a patronymic. Notable people with the name include:

- Ejigayehu Shibabaw, Ethiopian singer
- Tigist Shibabaw, Ethiopian singer
