= Guagusa Shekudad =

- Woreda
- Flag
- Zone: Agew Awi
- Region: Amhara Region

Area
  - Total: 296.04 km^{2} (114.30 sq mi)

Population (2012 est.)
  - Total: 91,752
  - Density: 309.93/km^{2} (802.72/sq mi)

Guagusa Shekudad, ጓጉሳ ሽኩዳድ also spelled Guagusa Shikudad, is one of the woredas in the Amhara Region of Ethiopia. Part of the Agew Awi Zone, Guagusa Shekudad is bordered on the west by Ankasha Guagusa, on the north by Banja Shekudad, and on the east and south by the Mirab Gojjam Zone. Towns in Guagusa Shekudad include Tilili. Guagusa Shekudad was part of former Banja woredas.

Guagusa Shikudad Woreda is divided into kebele administrations. The kebeles include Samuel Kebele and Kokobe Kebele, among other local administrative units.

== Kebeles ==
Samuel Kebele (ሳሙኤል ቀበሌ)

Kokobe Kebele (ኮኮቤ ቀበሌ)

== Demographics ==
A 2012 estimate puts the population at 91,752. This gives a population density of 309.93 people per square kilometer (802.72 people per square mile), given its area of 269.04 square kilometers (114.30 square miles), higher than the Agew Awi Zone average of 117.74 people per square kilometer (304.95 people per square mile).

Based on the 2007 national census conducted by the Central Statistical Agency of Ethiopia (CSA), this woreda has a total population of 83,930, of whom 41,427 are men and 42,503 women; 9,043 or 10.78% are urban inhabitants.

The majority of the inhabitants practiced Ethiopian Orthodox Christianity, with 99.91% reporting that as their religion.
