= Qwara =

Qwara may refer to:

- Qwara Province in Ethiopia
- Qwara language
- Qwara (woreda), a district in the approximate location as the province
