= Xamir =

Xamir may refer to:

- Xamtanga language
- Bandar Khamir, a city in Iran
