= Jawi (woreda) =

Jawi ጃዊ
- Woreda
- Flag
- Zone: Agew Awi
- Region: Amhara Region

Area
  - Total: 3,422.90 km^{2} (1,321.59 sq mi)

Population (2012 est.)
  - Total: 86,339
  - Density: 25.224/km^{2} (65.330/sq mi)

Jawi (Amharic: ጃዊ) is one of the woredas in the Amhara Region of Ethiopia. Part of the Agew Awi Zone, Jawi is bordered on the west by the Benishangul-Gumuz Region, on the north by Semien Gondar Zone, on the east by Mirab Gojjam Zone, and on the southeast by the Dangila. Jawi was part of Dangila and Alefa woredas.

== Demographics ==
A 2012 estimate puts the population at 86,339. Given an area of 3,422.90 square kilometers (1,321.59 square miles), this puts the population density at 25.22 people per square kilometer (65.33 people per square mile), much lower than the Agew Awi Zone average of 117.74 people per square kilometer (304.95 people per square mile).

Based on the 2007 national census conducted by the Central Statistical Agency of Ethiopia (CSA), this woreda has a total population of 79,090, of whom 41,407 are men and 37,683 women; 7,722 or 9.76% are urban inhabitants.

The majority of the inhabitants practiced Ethiopian Orthodox Christianity, with 93.1% reporting that as their religion, and 4.85% of the population said they were Muslim.
