= Injibara =

Town in Amhara Region, Ethiopia

Injibara እንጂባራ
- Town
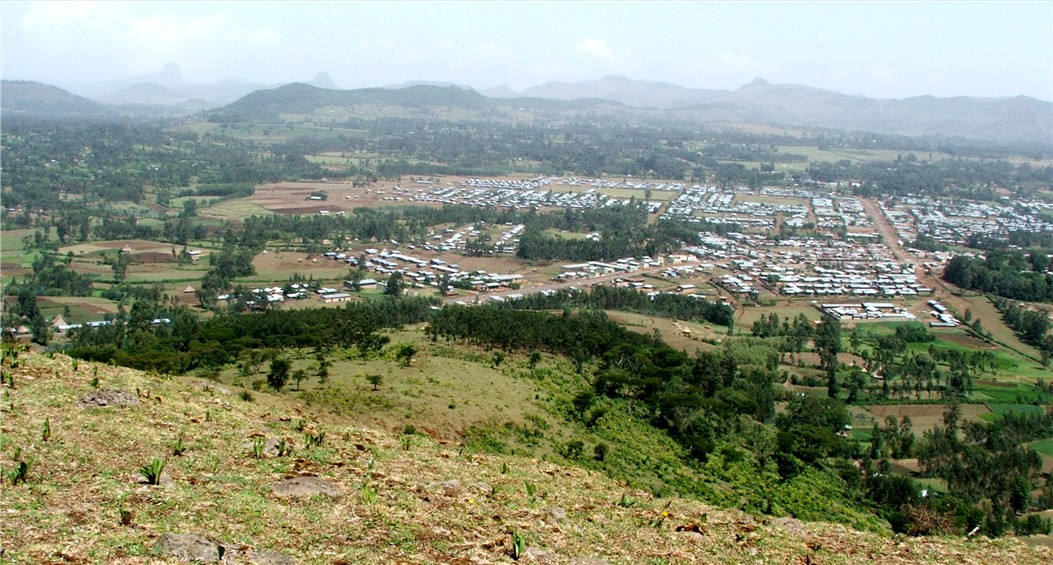
- Interactive map of Injibara
- Location in Ethiopia
- Coordinates: 10°57′N 36°56′E
- Country: Ethiopia
- Region: Amhara
- Zone: Agew Awi
- Elevation: 2,560 m (8,400 ft)

Population (2007)
  - Total: 21,065
- Time zone: UTC+3 (EAT)

Injibara (Amharic: እንጅባራ) is a town in Ethiopia. It is the administrative center of the Agew Awi Zone in the Amhara Region. Injibara is located at 10°57′N 36°56′E, in Banja Shekudad woreda at an elevation of 2,560 meters (8,400 ft) above sea level.

Injibara is situated in a predominantly mountainous location. Mount Zerehi, one of many massive stone monoliths found in the area, is to the west of the Bahir Dar road as it enters the town. Another geographical feature of the area is the Zengena crater lake just south of the town. The hills and valleys receive high amounts of rain, especially in the rainy season. This high rainfall permits farmers to grow multiple crops a year. With this rainy weather comes hail, however, which is a major problem for the local farmers.

Based on figures from the 2007 census, Injibara has an estimated total population of 21,065, of whom 10,596 are males and 10,469 are females.

== History ==
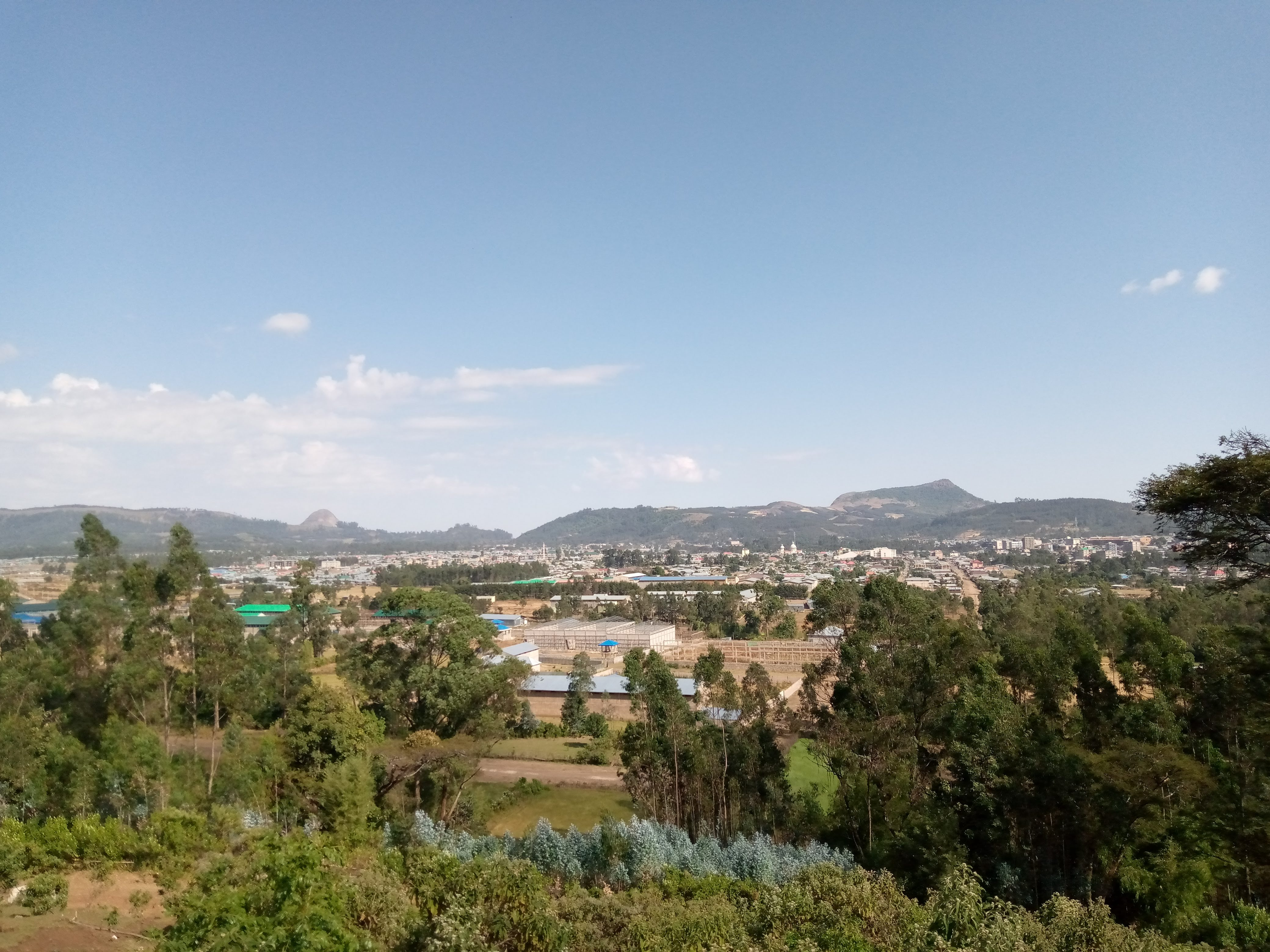
Injibara in 2020

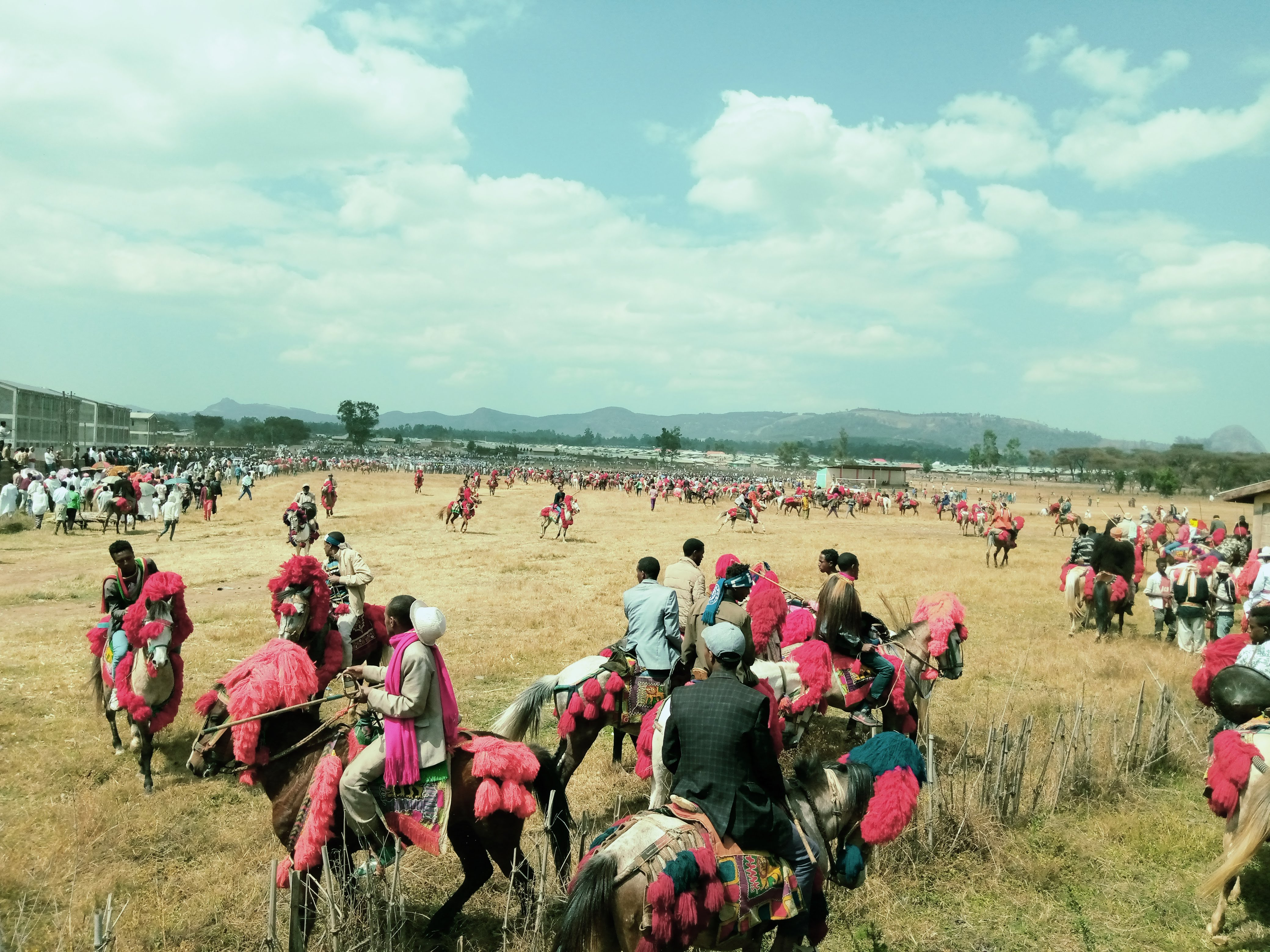
Horse-riding parade in Injibara town

Injibara was the scene of (in the words of Sven Rubenson) "one of the most bloody battles" of Emperor Tewodros' reign. In 1863, he marched against Tedla Gwalu, who had revolted against him in Gojjam. Whilst Tewodros defeated Gwalu in the battle, Gwalu escaped to continue his revolt against the Emperor.

Modern Injibara was constructed since 1991 at a place called Kosober by locals, at the junction of Highway 3 from Addis Ababa to Bahir Dar and the road leading west towards Chagni and into Metekel Zone. The older town of Injibara is situated approximately 5 km (3.1 mi) north of Modern Injibara at 10°59′N 36°55′E, at a 2,660-meter (8,730 ft) elevation.
