= Tigist =

Tigist is a given name. Notable people with the given name include:

- Tigist Assefa (born 1996), Ethiopian middle-distance runner
- Tigist Gashaw (born 1996), Ethiopian-born middle-distance runner
- Tigist Moreda (born 1968), Ethiopian long-distance runner
- Tigist Shibabaw (1980–2008), Ethiopian singer
- Tigist Tufa (born 1987), Ethiopian marathon runner
