= Xamir people =

Ethnic group in Ethiopia

Total population
- 463,000

Regions with significant populations
- Ethiopia

Languages
- Xamtanga

Religion
- Ethiopian Orthodox Tewahedo Church

Related ethnic groups
- Other Agaw peoples, especially Bilen

The Xamir people (also Ximre or Kamyr) are an ethnic group in Ethiopia and are one of the Agaw peoples. The Xamir live in Wag Hemra Zone in the Amhara Region. The three main towns in that area are Sekota, Tsizika, and Dehana.

== Population ==
The 2007 census lists 267,851 ethnic Xamirs, or 0.36% of the total population; 32,665 are urban inhabitants.

== Language ==
The Xamirs speak Xamtanga (also known as Agawinya, Khamtanga, Simt 'anga, Xamta or Xamir), one of the Agaw languages, which are part of the Cushitic subfamily within Afroasiatic. Agaw languages form the main substratum influence on Amharic and other Ethiopian Semitic languages, which are also Afroasiatic languages.
