= Radioaxiom: A Dub Transmission =

Studio album by Jah Wobble and Bill Laswell
- Released: September 18, 2001
- Recorded: Orange Music, West Orange, NJ
- Genre: Dub, jazz, ambient, world fusion
- Length: 51:54
- Label: Axiom, Palm Pictures
- Producer: Bill Laswell, Jah Wobble

Bill Laswell chronology
Life Space Death (2001)	Radioaxiom: A Dub Transmission (2001)	Filmtracks 2000 (2001)

Professional ratings
Review scores
Source	Rating
Allmusic	4/5 stars
Alternative Press	4/5 stars
Down Beat	3/5 stars
Q	3/5 stars

Radioaxiom: A Dub Transmission is a collaborative album by Bill Laswell and Jah Wobble, released on September 18, 2001, by Axiom and Palm Pictures.

== Reception ==
Critical reaction to Radioaxiom was generally positive. Thom Jurek of Allmusic wrote that the album's subtitle, A Dub Transmission was somewhat misleading as the album was not particularly influenced by dub reggae but taken on its own terms as a "mishmash of world musics and groove jazz [...] it works very well." He awarded Radioaxiom 4 stars out of a possible 5.

== Track listing ==
No.	Title	Writer(s)	Length
1.	"Subcode"	Bill Laswell, Jah Wobble	7:36
2.	"Alsema Dub"	Bill Laswell, Ejigayehu Shibabaw, Jah Wobble	5:48
3.	"Virus B"	Bill Laswell, Jah Wobble	8:06
4.	"Orion"	Bill Laswell, Jah Wobble	7:51
5.	"6th Chamber"	Bill Laswell, Jah Wobble	7:09
6.	"Alam Dub"	Bill Laswell, Ejigayehu Shibabaw, Jah Wobble	6:49
7.	"Second Sight"	Bill Laswell, Jah Wobble	8:35

== Personnel ==
Adapted from the Radioaxiom: A Dub Transmission liner notes.

Musicians

- Aïyb Dieng – percussion
- Hamid Drake – drums, tabla
- Sly Dunbar – drums
- Graham Haynes – cornet
- Karsh Kale – drums, tabla
- Bill Laswell – bass guitar, producer, mixing
- Nils Petter Molvær – trumpet
- Amina Claudine Myers – electric piano, organ
- Ejigayehu Shibabaw – vocals
- Tigist Shibabaw – vocals
- Nicky Skopelitis – guitar
- Jah Wobble – bass guitar, producer

Technical personnel

- James Dellatacoma – assistant engineering
- Michael Fossenkemper – mastering
- James Koehnline – cover art
- Robert Musso – engineering

== Release history ==
Region	Date	Label	Format	Catalog
United States	2001	Axiom, Palm Pictures	CD	PALMCD 2073-2
