= Khatasa Forest =

- Location within Ethiopia
- Location: Agew Awi Zone, Amhara Region Ethiopia
- Coordinates: 11.0186012°N 36.75867843°E
- Established: 1994

Khatasa Forest (sometimes spelled Kahitassa forest) is an Afromontane state forest and protected area located in the Agew Awi Zone of the Amhara Region in northwestern Ethiopia.

== History ==
The area has been protected since 1994. Since 2014 large amounts of the shrub land around the forest has been dedicated to plantation of Acacia decurrens trees.

== Geography ==
The forest area has an altitude ranging from 1500 to 3200 meters above the sea level. The forest consists of 35% Dega (cool and humid) and 65% Weyna Dega (cool sub-humid) climate zones. The protected area has a total area of between 7280 and 12,005 hectares, of which as of 2022 37.48% is natural forest, 24.72% is shrubland, 11.86% is plantation forest, 11.98% is decurrent seedlings, 11.78% is cropland, with remaining area divided between grazing, degraded and settlement land.

== Flora ==
A 2022 study identified following plants, among others, in the forest: Pavetta abyssinica, Apodytes dimidiata, Prunus africana, Albizia schimperiana, Vernonia auriculifera, Maytenus undata, Rubus apetalus and Vachellia abyssinica.

== Fauna ==
Black-and-white colobus monkey is present in the forest.
