= North American Conference on Afroasiatic Linguistics =

North American Conference on Afroasiatic Linguistics (NACAL) is a yearly academic conference addressing the Afroasiatic languages, which was initiated by Robert Hetzron. The conference has been held since 1973. Prominent participants have included Lionel Bender, Wolf Leslau, and Alan S. Kaye.
