= Life Space Death =

Studio album by Toshinori Kondo and Bill Laswell
- Released: April 22, 2001
- Recorded: Orange Music, West Orange, NJ, Regio Theatre, Yourin, Italy
- Genre: New age
- Length: 35:59
- Label: Meta
- Producer: Bill Laswell

Bill Laswell chronology
| Lo. Def Pressure (2000) | Life Space Death (2001) | Radioaxiom: A Dub Transmission (2001) |

Professional ratings
Review scores
| Source | Rating |
|---|---|
| Allmusic | 4/5 stars |

Life Space Death is a collaborative album by Toshinori Kondo and Bill Laswell, released on April 22, 2001 by Meta Records.

== Track listing ==
| No. | Title | Writer(s) | Length |
|---|---|---|---|
| 1. | "Life" | Toshinori Kondo, Bill Laswell | 7:48 |
| 2. | "Space" | Toshinori Kondo, Bill Laswell | 6:32 |
| 3. | "Death" | Toshinori Kondo, Bill Laswell | 7:43 |
| 4. | "Mun Pa" | Eraldo Bernocchi, Bill Laswell | 13:56 |

== Personnel ==
Adapted from the Life Space Death liner notes.

Musicians

- The Dalai Lama – voice
- Toshinori Kondo – trumpet, electronics
- Kalimpong Monastery monks – vocals, bells, horns and drums (4)
- Bill Laswell – bass guitar, guitar, keyboards, producer

Technical personnel

- Michael Fossenkemper – mastering
- Robert Musso – engineering
- Ellen Roebuck – design
- Dalai Roebuck – design

== Release history ==
| Region | Date | Label | Format | Catalog |
|---|---|---|---|---|
| United States | 2001 | Meta | CD | MT011 |
