= The Redesign =

Studio album by Operazone
- Released: May 9, 2000
- Recorded: Orange Music, West Orange, NJ
- Genre: Modern classical, electronic
- Length: 51:20
- Label: Knitting Factory
- Producer: Alan Douglas, Bill Laswell

Bill Laswell chronology
Dub Chamber 3 (2000)	The Redesign (2000)	Lo. Def Pressure (2000)

Professional ratings
Review scores
Source	Rating
Allmusic	2/5 stars

The Redesign is an album by American composer Bill Laswell, issued under the moniker Operazone. It was released on May 9, 2000 by Knitting Factory Records.

== Track listing ==
No.	Title	Writer(s)	Opera (date)	Length
1.	"Una furtiva lagrima"	Gaetano Donizetti	L'elisir d'amore (1832)	5:55
2.	"Love Theme"	Giuseppe Verdi	La traviata (1853)	5:53
3.	"Mon cœur s'ouvre à ta voix"	Camille Saint-Saëns	Samson and Delilah (1877)	4:33
4.	"Nessun dorma"	Giacomo Puccini	Turandot (1926)	6:45
5.	"Prelude"	Giuseppe Verdi	La traviata (1853)	5:30
6.	"Overture"	Giuseppe Verdi	La forza del destino (1862)	5:02
7.	"E Lucevan Le Stelle"	Giacomo Puccini	Tosca (1900)	5:29
8.	"Act 2: Orchestral Background"	Giacomo Puccini	Tosca (1900)	7:04
9.	"Una furtiva lagrima" (reprise)	Gaetano Donizetti	L'elisir d'amore (1832)	5:09

== Personnel ==
Adapted from the liner notes of The Redesign.

Musicians

- Karl Berger – keyboards, musical arrangements
- Vincent Chancey – French horn
- Hector Falcon – violin
- Ralph Farris – viola, violin
- Becky Friend – alto flute
- Diva Goodfriend-Koven – alto flute, bass flute
- Graham Haynes – cornet, flugelhorn
- Mark Helias – double bass
- Byard Lancaster – tenor saxophone
- Denise Stillwell – viola, violin
- Mark Taylor – French horn
- Krystof Witek – violin
- Garo Yellin – cello

Technical personnel

- Alan Douglas – producer
- Michael Fossenkemper – mastering
- Bill Laswell – producer
- Russell Mills – photography, design
- Robert Musso – engineering

== Release history ==
Region	Date	Label	Format	Catalog
United States	2000	Knitting Factory	CD	KFW 267
