= Lo. Def Pressure =

Studio album by Bill Laswell
- Released: October 3, 2000
- Recorded: Orange Music, West Orange, NJ
- Genre: Drum and bass
- Length: 48:13
- Label: Quatermass, Sub Rosa
- Producer: Bill Laswell

Bill Laswell chronology
The Redesign (2000)	Lo. Def Pressure (2000)	Life Space Death (2001)

Professional ratings
Review scores
Source	Rating
Allmusic	3/5 stars

Lo. Def Pressure is the twelfth solo album by American composer Bill Laswell, released on October 3, 2000, by Sub Rosa.

== Track listing ==
All music is composed by Bill Laswell.

No.	Title	Length
1.	"Shyvamthscience"	23:36
2.	"Black Ice"	24:37

== Personnel ==
Adapted from the Lo. Def Pressure liner notes.

Musicians

- Hassan Akber Ali – instruments
- Zakir Hussain – percussion
- Bill Laswell – bass guitar, keyboards, drum programming, producer
- Badal Roy – percussion
- Arif Singh – instruments
- Kadri Sriram – instruments

Technical personnel

- Michael Fossenkemper – mastering
- Robert Musso – engineering

== Release history ==
Region	Date	Label	Format	Catalog
Belgium	2000	Quatermass, Sub Rosa	CD, LP	SR 150
