= Qimant language =

Cushitic language in Ethiopia

Qimant
- Kemantney
- Native to: Ethiopia
- Region: Amhara Region
- Ethnicity: Qemant
- Native speakers: (1,700 cited 1994 census)
- Language family: Afro-Asiatic: Cushitic; Central; Western; Qimant
- Dialects: Qwara

Language codes
- ISO 639-3: ahg
- Glottolog: qima1242
- ELP: K'emant

The Qimant language is a highly endangered language spoken by a small and elderly fraction of the Qemant people in northern Ethiopia, mainly in the Chilga woreda in Semien Gondar Zone between Gondar and Metemma.

== Classifications ==
The language belongs to the western branch of the Agaw languages. Other (extinct) varieties of this branch are Qwara and Kayla. Along with all other Cushitic languages, Qimant belongs to the Afroasiatic language family.

== Geographic distribution and sociolinguistic situation ==
Qimant is the original language of the Qemant people of North Gondar Zone, Ethiopia. Although the ethnic population of the Qemant was 172,327 at the 1994 census, only a very small fraction of these speak the language nowadays. All speakers live either in the Chilga or Lay Armachiho woredas. The number of first-language speakers is 1,625, the number of second language speakers 3,450. All speakers of the language are older than 30 years, and more than 75% are older than 50 years. The language is no longer passed on to the next generation of speakers. Most ethnic Qemant people speak Amharic. Qimant is not spoken in public or even within the home as a means of daily communication anymore, but is reduced to a secret code.Today, most ethnic Qemants overwhelmingly identify as Amharas, and Qemant was removed as an identity from Ethiopia’s 2007 national census, but there are some Qemant communities who are still attempting to preserve their culture and language.

=== Dialects/Varieties ===
It is not clear to what extent Kayla, Qwara, and Qimant have been dialects of the same Western Agaw language, or were languages distinct from each other.

== Phonology ==
=== Consonants ===
Consonant phonemes
		Labial	Alveolar	Palatal	Velar	
		Labial	Alveolar	Palatal	plain	lab.
Nasal		m	n		ŋ	ŋʷ
Plosive	voiceless		t	tʃ	k	kʷ
Plosive	voiced	b	d	dʒ	ɡ	ɡʷ
Fricative	voiceless	f	s	ʃ	χ	χʷ
Fricative	voiced		z		ɣ	ɣʷ
Tap			r			
Approximant			l	j		w

Continuants can be geminated word-medially.

=== Vowels ===
Vowel phonemes
	Front	Central	Back
Close	i ⟨i⟩	ɨ ⟨ï⟩	u ⟨u⟩
Mid		ə	o
Open		a	

=== Phonotactics ===
The maximum syllable structure in Qimant is CVC, which implies that consonant clusters are only allowed word-medially. In loanwords from Amharic there may also be consonant-clusters within a syllable. Vowel clusters are not allowed.

=== Phonological processes ===
Consonant clusters with more than two consonants are broken up by inserting the epenthetic vowel /ɨ/. Other phonological processes are nasal assimilation and devoicing of /ɡ/ at word boundaries.

=== Prosody ===
The prosodic features of Qimant have not been studied yet.

== Grammar ==
=== Morphology ===
The personal marking system distinguishes between first person singular and plural, second person singular, polite, and plural, and third person masculine, feminine and plural. On the verb, all inflectional categories are marked by suffixes. Zelealem (2003, p. 192) identifies three different aspect forms in Qimant: Perfective, Imperfective and Progressive. Like in other Central Cushitic languages, the numbers one to nine go back to an ancient quinary system, where the suffix /-ta/ added to the numbers two to four results in the numbers six to nine (2-4 are three numbers, 6-9 are four numbers).

=== Syntax ===
The basic constituent order in Qimant, like in all other Afro-Asiatic languages of Ethiopia, is SOV. The presence of a case marking system allows for other, more marked orders. In the noun phrase the head noun follows its modifiers. Numbers, however, can also follow the head noun. All kind of subordinate clauses precede the main verb of the sentence.

== Vocabulary ==
As a consequence of the looming language death, many items of the vocabulary have already been replaced by Amharic words.
