= Lionel Bender =

American linguist (1934–2008)

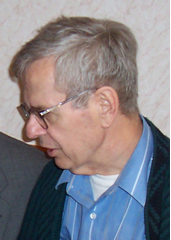
- M. Lionel Bender in 2004
- Born: August 18, 1934; Mechanicsburg, Pennsylvania
- Died: February 19, 2008 (aged 73); Cape Girardeau, Missouri
- Occupation: Linguist

Marvin Lionel Bender (August 18, 1934 – February 19, 2008) was an American linguist.

== Life ==
Bender was born August 18, 1934, in Mechanicsburg, Pennsylvania. He travelled throughout the world, particularly in Northeast Africa, and was an accomplished chess player.

Dr. Bender died of complications from a stroke and brain hemorrhage on February 19, 2008, in Cape Girardeau, Missouri.

== Career ==
Bender wrote and co-wrote several books, publications and essays on the languages of Africa, particularly those spoken in Ethiopia and Sudan, and was a major contributor to Ethiopian Studies. He did extensive work on the Afro-Asiatic and Nilo-Saharan languages spoken locally, and advocated the theory of the Omotic languages as an independent branch of Afro-Asiatic.

Together with J. Donald Bowen, Robert L. Cooper, and Charles A. Ferguson, Bender carried out the Survey of Language Use and Language Teaching in East Africa, funded by the Ford Foundation in 1968-1970. He later conducted other research sponsored by the National Science Foundation.

Among other works, his books include Amharic Verb Morphology (his PhD dissertation - a generative study of Amharic verbal morphology), Language in Ethiopia (co-edited with C. Ferguson, C. Bowen, R. Cooper), Nilo-Saharan Language Studies, The Non-Semitic Languages of Ethiopia, Preliminary Gaam-English-Gaam Dictionary, Omotic Verb Morphology, and the Berta Lexicon. For many years, he was closely involved with NACAL, the annual North American Conference on Afroasiatic Linguistics.

Bender retired from Southern Illinois University Carbondale.

== Works ==
- 1968: Amharic Verb Morphology: A Generative Approach. University of Texas.
- 1975: Omotic: a new Afroasiatic language family. (University Museum Series, 3.) Carbondale, IL: Southern Illinois University.
- 1976: (et al.) Language in Ethiopia. London: Oxford University Press.
- 1976: (ed.) The Non-Semitic Languages of Ethiopia. East Lansing, Michigan: African Studies Center, Michigan State University.
- 1980: (with: Malik Agaar Ayre) Preliminary Gaam-English-Gaam Dictionary. Carbondale, IL: Dept. of Linguistics, Southern Illinois University.
- 1981: (ed.) Peoples and Cultures of the Ethio-Sudan Borderlands. East Lansing, Michigan: African Studies Center, Michigan State University.
- 1981: (with: Thilo C. Schadeberg, eds.) Nilo-Saharan. Dordrecht, Holland & Cinnaminson, NJ: Foris.
- 1983: (ed.) Nilo-Saharan Language Studies. East Lansing, Michigan: African Studies Center, Michigan State University.
- 2000: Comparative Morphology of the Omotic Languages. Munich: LINCOM.
- 2003: Omotic Lexicon and Phonology. Self publication.
- 2005: The East Sudanic Languages: Lexicon and Phonology. Carbondale, IL: SIU Printing (self-published).
- 2020: (ed. by Grover Hudson) Cushitic Lexicon and Phonology. (Schriften zur Afrikanistik / Research in African Studies 28.) Berlin: Peter Lang.

== Notes ==
- Obituary by Grover Hudson at the LINGUIST List web resource.
