= Kwara (disambiguation) =

Kwara State is a state in western Nigeria.

Kwara may also refer to:

- Kwara United F.C., a Nigerian football club in Kwara
- Qwara Province in Ethiopia
- Kwara, a common name of the western brush wallaby
