= Kosober =

Kosober (Amharic: ኮሶበር) is the town in Gojjam Agawmeder, Amhara Region, Ethiopia, which is found between Bahir Dar and Debre Marqos.

Kosober is the home for the Agaw people from the time of Axumite.

They are known for their ecologically sustainable and agricultural practices.

The population of Kosober is around 6,051.

Kosober is located 150 kilometers northeast of Debre Markos along the road to Bahir Dar.
