= Agaw languages =

Cushitic languages in Ethiopia and Eritrea

Agaw
- Central Cushitic
- Geographic distribution: Ethiopia and central Eritrea
- Ethnicity: Agaw
- Linguistic classification: Afro-Asiatic: Cushitic; Agaw
- Proto-language: Proto-Agaw
- Subdivisions: Southern; Eastern; Northern; Western

Language codes
- Glottolog: cent2193

The Agaw or Central Cushitic languages are Afroasiatic languages spoken by several groups in Ethiopia and, in one case, Eritrea. They form the main substratum influence on Amharic and other Ethio-Semitic languages.

== Classification ==
The Central Cushitic languages are classified as follows (after Appleyard):

- Awngi (South Agaw) spoken southwest of Lake Tana, much the largest, with over 350,000 speakers

(Kunfäl, spoken west of Lake Tana, is poorly recorded but most likely a dialect of Awngi)

- Northern Agaw:

- Bilen–Xamtanga:

- Bilen (North) spoken (70,000 speakers) in Eritrea around the town of Keren and eastern Sudan around the town of Kassala
- Xamtanga (Central Agaw; also called Khamir, Khamta) 143,000 speakers in the North Amhara Region

- Qimant (Western Agaw) nearly extinct, spoken by the Qemant in Semien Gondar Zone

(dialects Qwara – nearly extinct, spoken by Beta Israel formerly living in Qwara, now in Israel; Kayla – extinct, formerly spoken by some Beta Israel, transitional between Qimant and Xamtanga)

There is a literature in Agaw but it is widely dispersed: from medieval texts containing passages in the Qimant language, now mostly in Israeli museums, to the modern Bilen language with its own newspaper, based in Keren, Eritrea. Historical material is also available in the Xamtanga language, and there is a deep tradition of folklore in the Awngi language.

== Phonology ==
Central Cushitic languages are characterised by the presence of /ŋ/, /ɣ/, /z/, and central vowels, while they lack ejectives, implosives, pharyngeals, consonant gemination, vowel length, and the consonant /ɲ/.

== See also ==
- Agaw people
- List of Proto-Agaw reconstructions (Wiktionary)

== Bibliography ==
- Appleyard, David L. (2006) A Comparative Dictionary of the Agaw Languages (Kuschitische Sprachstudien – Cushitic Language Studies Band 24). Köln: Rüdiger Köppe Verlag.
- Hetzron, Robert (1976) The Agaw Languages. Afroasiatic Linguistics 3,3. p. 31–37
- Joswig, Andreas and Hussein Mohammed (2011). A Sociolinguistic Survey Report; Revisiting the Southern Agaw Language areas of Ethiopia. SIL International. SIL Electronic Survey Reports 2011–047.
