= David Appleyard =

British academic specialising in Ethiopian languages and linguistics

David Appleyard (born 1950 in Leeds, United Kingdom) is a British academic and a specialist in Ethiopian languages and linguistics.

He is Professor Emeritus of the Languages of the Horn of Africa at the School of Oriental and African Studies (SOAS) in the University of London, where he specialized in Amharic and other Ethiopian Semitic languages, as well as various Cushitic languages of the region. He went first to SOAS as a student in 1968, studying Amharic and Linguistics, and completed his doctorate there on the Semitic basis of the Amharic lexicon in 1975, with Edward Ullendorff as supervisor. He then joined the staff at SOAS where he remained from 1975 until his retirement in September 2006. He taught Amharic language and literature, as well as courses on Ge’ez, Tigrinya, Somali, Oromo, African linguistics, and Ethiopian cultural history.

His linguistic research focuses both on Ethiopian Semitic and Cushitic, especially on the Central Cushitic or Agaw languages on which he has published numerous articles and monographs and a book. He has also published on Ethiopian linguistics in general, Ethiopian manuscripts, and the Ethiopian Orthodox Church, and has published a beginner’s textbook for learning Amharic, Colloquial Amharic.

He acts as a consultant on Ethiopian manuscripts and magic scrolls, and has worked for, amongst others, Christie’s of London, Sam Fogg Rare Books of London, and Princeton University Library. Since 2007 he was involved as an editor and field specialist with the Encyclopaedia Aethiopica project. More recently, he has been a co-editor and contributor to the book Ethiopia. History, Culture and Challenges, published as a joint project hosted under the Hiob Ludolf Centre for Ethiopian Studies, Hamburg University.

In 2014, he was awarded the British Academy Edward Ullendorff Medal for Semitic Languages and Ethiopian Studies.

== Selected bibliography ==
- 1975 The Semitic Basis of the Amharic lexicon. Doctorate, University of London, School of Oriental and African Studies.
- 1985 Letters from Ethiopian Rulers (Early and Mid-Nineteenth Century) with Richard Pankhurst and A.K. Irvine. Oxford: Oxford University Press for the British Academy.
- 1986 Agaw, Cushitic and Afroasiatic. Journal of Semitic Studies 31,2:195-236.
- 1987 A grammatical sketch of Khamtanga. Bulletin of the School of Oriental and African Studies 50,2:241-266; 50,3:470-507.
- 1988 The Agaw languages: a comparative morphological perspective. In Taddese Beyene (ed.) Proceedings of the Eighth International Conference of Ethiopian Studies 1:581-592. Huntingdon: Elm Press.
- 1993 Ethiopian Manuscripts. London: Jed Press.
- 1993 Vocalic ablaut and aspect marking in the verb in Agaw. Journal of Afroasiatic Languages 3,2:126-150.
- 1994 A Falasha prayer text in Agaw. In Gideon Goldenberg & Shlomo Raz (eds.) Semitic and Cushitic Studies 206-251. Wiesbaden: Harrassowitz.
- 1995 Colloquial Amharic. A Complete Language Course. London & New York: Routledge.
- 1996 Ethiopian Semitic and South Arabian: towards a re-examination of a relationship. Israel Oriental Studies 16:203-228.
- 1998 Language death – the case of Qwarenya (Ethiopia). In Matthias Brenzinger (ed.) Endangered Languages in Africa 143-161. Köln: Köppe Verlag.
- 1999 Afroasiatic and the Nostratic Hypothesis. In Colin Renfrew & Daniel Nettle (eds.) Nostratic: Examining a Linguistic Macrofamily 289-314. Cambridge: The McDonald Institute for Archaeological Research. ISBN 978-1-902937-00-7
- 2002 The morphology of main and subordinate verb form marking, with special reference to Ethiopian Semitic and Agaw. Afrikanistische Arbeitspapiere 71:9-31.
- 2006 A Comparative Dictionary of the Agaw languages. Köln: Köppe Verlag. ISBN 978-3-89645-481-2
- 2007 Ethiopian Christianity. In Ken Parry (ed.) The Blackwell Companion to Eastern Christianity 117-136. Oxford: Blackwell.
- 2007 Beja morphology. In Alan Kaye (ed.) Morphologies of Africa and Asia 1:447-479. Winona Lake: Eisenbrauns.
- 2007 The Horn of Africa, with Martin Orwin. In Andrew Simpson (ed.) Language and National Identity in Africa. 267-290. Oxford: Oxford University Press.
- 2017 (with Siegbert Uhlig, Alessandro Bausi, Wolfgang Hahn, Steven Kaplan eds.) Ethiopia. History, Culture and Challenges..Berlin and ast Lansing: Lit Verlag & Michigan State University Press.
