= Robert Hetzron =

Hungarian linguist (1938–1997)

- Born: Robert Herzog; 31 December 1937; Budapest, Hungary
- Died: 12 August 1997 (aged 59); Santa Barbara, California, U.S.
- Education: University of Budapest; Hebrew University of Jerusalem; University of California, Los Angeles
- Occupation: Linguist

Robert Hetzron, born Herzog (31 December 1937, Budapest – 12 August 1997, Santa Barbara, California), was a Hungarian-born linguist known for his work on the comparative study of Afro-Asiatic languages, as well as for his study of Cushitic and Ethiopian Semitic languages.

== Biography ==
Born in Hungary, as a child, Hetzron received both a general and religious Jewish education. He attended the University of Budapest, where he studied the Hungarian language and Hebrew as major subjects and started attending courses in the Department of Semitic Philology and Arabic. However, a few months later, he fled Budapest by foot following the 1956 Uprising in Hungary. He briefly stayed in Vienna and studied for a time in Strasbourg, before finally settling in Paris, where he studied linguistics with André Martinet and Joseph Tubiana. In 1960/61 he studied Finnish at Jyväskylä, Somali in London, and Italian at Perugia. He received his M.A. degree at the Hebrew University of Jerusalem, 1961-1964 under the supervision of Hans Jakob Polotsky, and his Ph.D. at the University of California, Los Angeles, 1964-1966 under the supervision of Wolf Leslau. From 1966 and until his death he was professor at the University of California, Santa Barbara. In 1972, he initiated the North American Conference on Afroasiatic Linguistics (NACAL). In 1977–78, he held a Guggenheim Fellowship and pursued research at the School of Oriental and African Studies in London. In addition to Afroasiatic linguistics, during this time he also made contributions to the linguistics of the Gascon language of southwestern France. Hetzron offered original ideas; first of all, about linguistic subgrouping in diachrony. According to his explicit and theoretically grounded classification of Semitic, Arabic was grouped in Central rather than South Semitic. He demonstrated that in Ethiopian Semitic, the Gurage group is not genetically valid. His attempt to integrate the description of stress and intonation into syntax is unique (see his Hungarian publications).

On the occasion of his death in 1997, Robert Backus composed the following tribute to him:

Robert Hetzron was appointed Assistant Professor in the (then) Department of Germanic and Slavic Languages and Literatures in 1966 to initiate a program in Hebrew language and literature. He became Associate Professor in 1969 and Professor in 1974. Although this appointment largely defined his teaching career, his scholarly interests and research were far more extensive. He was first and foremost a linguist who specialized in Afroasiatic languages and whose work embraced comparative studies, semantic analysis and theoretical aspects of grammar. At the same time he had a nice appreciation of the nuances of literature, which began to show up in his late publications in the form of translation and textual analysis. Robert's development as a linguist proceeded from an early phase of intralingual description and analysis outward toward a comprehensive interlingual perspective focusing on comparison and theory. A large proportion of his work had to do with the Afroasiatic languages, where he made contributions in comparative and historical studies that fundamentally defined that field. He wrote also on the Semitic languages ancillary to his Afroasiatic interests, and he made a special study with considerable publication of his native language, Hungarian. English also provided grist for his mill, serving up material for some of his theoretical work.

Robert's polyglotism seems to have started from the force of circumstances. Born in Budapest in 1937, he just managed to gain admittance into the Eötvös Loránd University of Budapest in 1956, when the failure of the Hungarian uprising expelled him to France as a refugee. From 1957 to 1961 he lived the life of a peripatetic student marked by stints at the University of Strasbourg, the École Nationale des Langues Orientales Vivantes, the École des Hautes Études, the Hebrew University in Jerusalem, and the University of Vienna, as well as schools in Finland, England, and Italy This exploratory period ended in the fall of 1961, when Robert emigrated to Israel and entered the Hebrew University as a graduate student. After a year's service in the Israeli army, he completed his interrupted education there by earning an M.A. in linguistics (Semitic languages) in 1964. In the fall of that year he entered the Ph.D. program of the Department of Near Eastern Languages at UCLA. He did fieldwork in Ethiopia on Semitic and Cushitic languages in 1965-66 and was awarded the Ph.D. in Near Eastern languages in 1966. His appointment to UCSB followed immediately thereafter.

== Selected publications ==
=== Hungarian Language ===
- Hetzron, R. (1962) L'accent en hongrois. Paris, Bulletin de la Société de Linguistique de Paris 57, pp. 192–205.
- Hetzron, R. (1964) Les syntagmes à totalisateur du hongrois. Word 20, 55-71.

=== Cushitic languages ===
- Hetzron, R. (1969). The Verbal System of Southern Agaw. Berkeley & Los Angeles: University of California Press. (Ph.D.-thesis)

=== Ethiopian Semitic languages ===
- Hetzron, R. (1972). Ethiopian Semitic: studies in classification. Manchester: Manchester University Press. ISBN 0-7190-1123-X.
- Hetzron, R. (1977). The Gunnän-Gurage Languages. Napoli: Istituto Orientale di Napoli.
- Hetzron, R. (1996). "The two futures in Central and Peripheral Western Gurage". In Grover Hudson (ed.). Essays on Gurage language and culture: dedicated to Wolf Leslau on the occasion of his 90th birthday. Wiesbaden: Harrassowitz. pp. 101–109.
- Chamora, B.; Hetzron, R. (2000). Inor. Munich: Lincom Europa. ISBN 3-89586-977-5.

=== Comparative study of Semitic and Afroasiatic languages ===
- Hetzron, R. (1990). "Afroasiatic Languages". In Bernard Comrie (ed.). The World's major languages. Oxford: Oxford University Press.
- R.Hetzron, ed. (1997). The Semitic languages. London: Routledge. doi:10.4324/9781315002682. ISBN 9780415412667.

== Commemoration ==
The 35th annual meeting of the North American Conference on Afroasiatic Linguistics (NACAL 35, San Antonio, 2007), which was initiated by Robert Hetzron at Santa Barbara in 1972, is dedicated to his memory.
