= Balla Tounkara =

- Citizenship: Mali
- Occupation: Musician

Balla Tounkara is a kora player and singer from Mali.

He was born in Mali into a family of griots, who traditionally played music to the kings of the Malian Empire in their royal court. He started to learn the kora as a child.

Tounkara has released many albums and plays both solo and with a group called Groupe Spirite. He moved to the United States in 1996 and now lives in Boston.
