= Qwara dialect =

Endangered Qimant dialect spoken in Ethiopia

Qwara
- Qwareña
- Native to: Ethiopia
- Region: Amhara Region
- Ethnicity: Beta Israel
- Extinct: c. 2000; L2: 3,200
- Language family: Afro-Asiatic: Cushitic; Central; Northern; Qimant; Qwara
- Writing system: Geʽez

Language codes
- ISO 639-3: –
- Glottolog: hwar1238
- ELP: Hwarasa

Qwara, or Qwareña (called "Falasha" (Hwarasa) in some older sources), was one of two Agaw dialects, spoken by a subgroup of the Beta Israel (Jews of Ethiopia) of Qwara Province. It is a dialect of Qimant. It is nearly extinct. Several early Falashan manuscripts, using the Ge'ez script, exist; in more recent times, the language has been recorded by several linguists and travellers, starting with Flad in 1866.

Qwareña was on the decline in the early 20th century because it was being replaced by Amharic. During Operation Solomon, most of its remaining speakers were airlifted to Israel, where it continues to lose ground to Modern Hebrew.

== See also ==
- Kayla dialect
