= Xamtanga language =

Ethiopian language

Xamtanga
- ኽምጣጘ (X’imt’a-nga)
- Pronunciation: [ˈχamtaŋa]
- Native to: Ethiopia
- Region: North Amhara Region
- Ethnicity: Xamirs
- speakers: L1: 210,000 (2010); L2: 11,000
- Language family: Afro-Asiatic: Cushitic; Agaw; Eastern; Xamtanga
- Writing system: Ge'ez script

Language codes
- ISO 639-3: xan
- Glottolog: xamt1239

Xamtanga (also Agawinya, Khamtanga, Simt'anga, Xamir, Xamta) is a Central Cushitic language spoken in Ethiopia by the Xamir people.

== Phonology ==
=== Vowels ===
	Front	Central	Back
High	i	ɨ	u
Mid vowel	ə		
Low vowel	a		

The central vowels /ɨ ə a/ have fronted and backed allophones, depending on the adjacent consonant(s).

=== Consonants ===
		Labial	Coronal	Palatal	Velar		Uvular		Glottal
		Labial	Coronal	Palatal	plain	labialized	plain	labialized	Glottal
Nasal		m	n		ŋ	ŋʷ			
Plosive/ Affricate	voiceless		t	t͡ʃ	k	kʷ	q	qʷ	
Plosive/ Affricate	voiced	b	d	d͡ʒ	ɡ	ɡʷ			
Plosive/ Affricate	ejective		tʼ	t͡ʃʼ	kʼ	kʷʼ			
Fricative	voiceless	f	s	ʃ			χ	χʷ	h*
Fricative	voiced		z						
Fricative	ejective		sʼ						
Lateral			l						
Tap			ɾ						
Semivowel				j		w			

- /h/ is found only word-initial in loanwords, and may be glottal [h] or pharyngeal [ħ].
- /t/ is alveolar before the vowel /i/, dental otherwise.
- /q/ can be ejective [qʼ], and in some cases the ejectives appear to be in free variation with the voiceless plosives.

=== Phonological processes ===
==== Gemination ====
In positions other than word-initial, Xamtanga contrasts geminate and non-geminate consonants. With most consonants, the difference between a geminate and a non-geminate is simply one of length, but the cases of /b t q/ are more complex. When not word-initial, non-geminate /b/ is realized as a bilabial [β] or labiodental fricative [v], and /t/ and /q/ are realized as affricates: [tθ qχ]. Their geminate equivalents may be realized as prolonged [bː tː qː], or can simply be short [b t q].

In word-initial position, geminate consonants do not occur, and /b t q/ are realized as plosives.

== Bibliography ==
- Appleyard, D. L. (1987). "A Grammatical Sketch of Khamtanga—I". Bulletin of the School of Oriental and African Studies, University of London. 50 (2): 241–266. doi:10.1017/S0041977X00049028. S2CID 123007452.
- Appleyard, D. L. (1987). "A Grammatical Sketch of Khamtanga—II". Bulletin of the School of Oriental and African Studies, University of London. 50 (3): 470–507. doi:10.1017/S0041977X00039471. S2CID 246637332.
- Appleyard, David L. (1988). "A Definite Article in Xamtanga". African Languages and Cultures. 1 (1): 15–24. doi:10.1080/09544168808717677.
- Appleyard, David L. (2006). A Comparative Dictionary of the Agaw Languages. Kuschitische Sprachstudien – Cushitic Language Studies. Vol. 24. Köln: Rüdiger Köppe Verlag. ISBN 978-3-89645-481-2.
- Darmon, Chloé (2010). "L'agäw xamtanga: une langue couchitique en contact avec l'amharique". Pount. Cahiers d'études: Corne de l'Afrique - Arabie du Sud. 4: 169–195.
- Chloé Darmon (2023). "Xamtanga". In Ronny Meyer; Zelealem Leyew; Bedilu Wakjira (eds.). Oxford Handbook of Ethiopian Languages. Oxford: Oxford University Press. pp. 374–396.
