= Weyala =

Conductor of public transport in Ethiopia

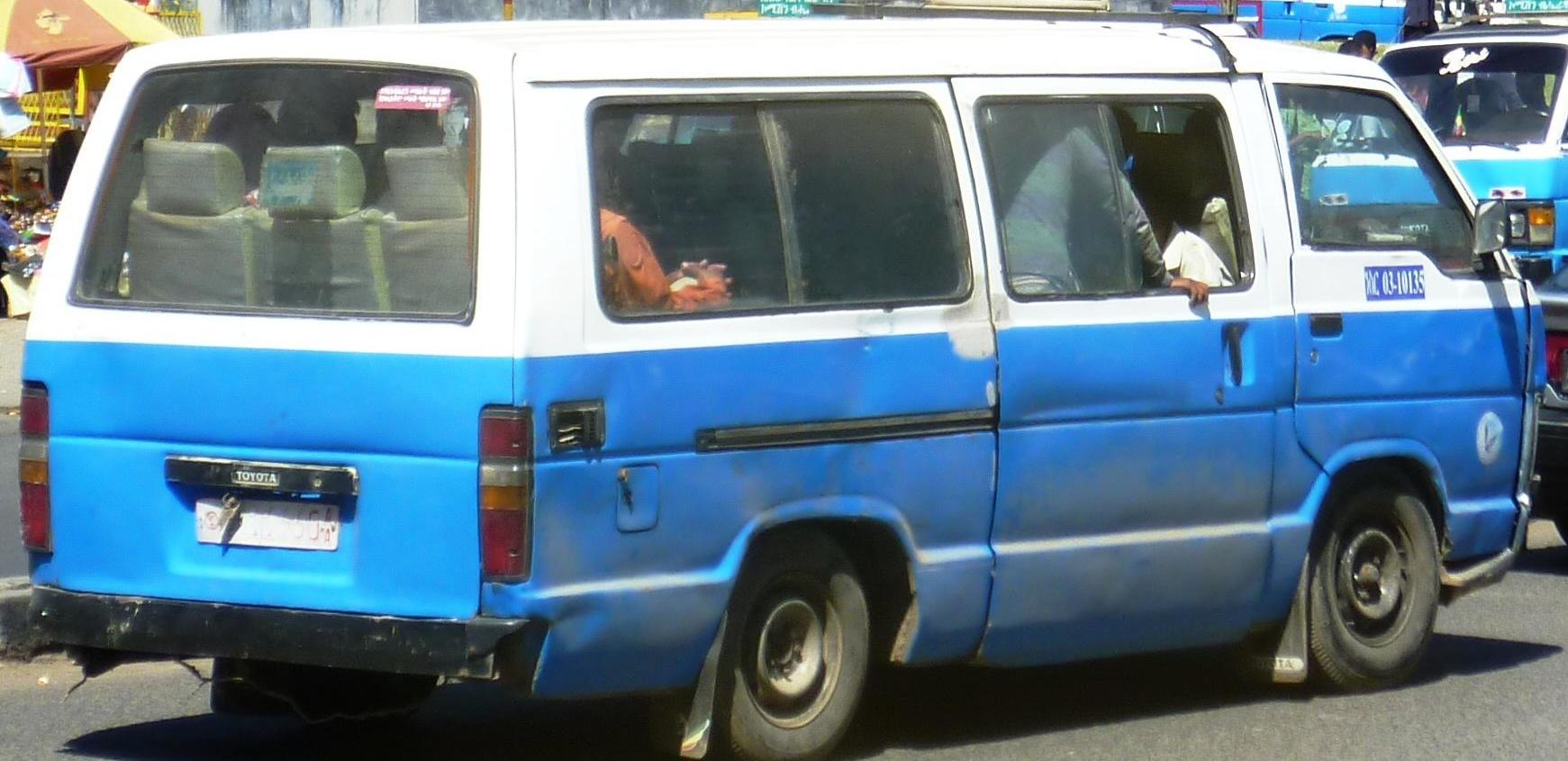
- Weyala operates in share taxis, usually like this sky blue and white colored minibus

Occupation
- Names: "Redat" (Amharic: ረዳት, "Assistant")
- Occupation type: Conductor; Fare collector; Bus conductor
- Activity sectors: Public transport

Description
- Competencies: Informal skill

A weyala (Amharic: ወያላ) is a conductor who receives fares on minibus share taxis in Ethiopia. He also has the duty of informing potential passengers of the destination they are heading and the price they need to pay, and informing the taxi driver to stop when a passenger wants to disembark. They also collect the appropriate price from the passenger as the taxi is moving and generally keeping the law on board the minibus taxi. Weyalas can be from various age groups, and in recent times, women have been known to work as weyalas.
