= Dangila =

- Location in Ethiopia
- Coordinates: 11°16′N 36°50′E
- Country: Ethiopia
- Region: Amhara Region
- Zone: Agew Awi Zone

Population (2007)
  - Total: 24,827
  - Estimate (2021): 53,225
- Time zone: UTC+3 (EAT)

Dangila (Amharic: ዳንግላ) is a town in northwestern Ethiopia. Located in the Agew Awi Zone of the Amhara Region, this town has a latitude and longitude of 11°16′N 36°50′E with an elevation of 2137 meters above sea level. It is the largest of three towns in Dangila woreda.

== History ==
One of the earliest mentions of Dangila was when the Emperor Susenyos passed through the town in 1620.

As late as the 1930s, Dangila was an important center of the African slave trade. Nagadras Habtewerq, director of customs in the town during the early 1930s, achieved a measure of success in liberating slaves despite the determined opposition of influential figures like the slaver Fitawrari Zelleqe.

The British maintained a consulate in Dangila in the 1920s and 1930s, manned by R.E. Cheesman, who spent a considerable amount of energy mapping Agawmeder and nearby Gojjam.

Dangila has played a role in Ethiopian literature. As a young man, Haddis Alemayehu, who was to become the foremost Amharic fiction writer, served for two years as a customs clerk at Dangila in the early 1930s. When consul Cheesman left, the consulate building was turned into a primary school, and Haddis Alemayehu became its headmaster for a year. Another author is Abe Gubegna, who attended grades 1-8 at the Bitwedded Mengesha Jembere school in the 1950s.

== Demographics ==
Based on the national census conducted by the Central Statistical Agency in 2007, Dangila had a total population of 24,827, of whom 12,389 were male and 12,438 were female. The 1994 census reported this town had a total population of 15,437 of whom 6,796 were male and 8,641 were female.

== Notable residents ==
- Maru Teferi (born 1992), Israeli Olympic marathoner
