= Tigist Shibabaw =

Ethiopian singer (1980–2008)

Background information
- Born: Tigist Shibabaw; 1980
- Origin: Chagni, Ethiopia
- Died: January 2008 (aged 27–28) Bahar Dar, Ethiopia
- Genres: Ethiopian music; hip hop
- Occupation: Singer
- Instrument: Vocals
- Years active: 2000–2008
- Label: Palm Pictures
- Formerly of: Bole2Harlem

Tigist Shibabaw (1980 – January 2008) was an Ethiopian singer and one of the original members of the Harlem-based hip hop fusion band Bole2Harlem. She was born in Chagni, Ethiopia, like her sister, the singer Gigi.

== Early life ==
Tigist was born and raised in Chagni, a small town in northwestern Ethiopia. She was one of ten siblings, born into a family of coffee farmers who relied on the local river for their harvest.

== Career ==
Tigist immigrated to the United States in 2000 to pursue a career in music, joining her older sister Gigi, who was already a musician. Their father had initially forbidden Gigi from becoming an entertainer.

Tigist performed with her sister Gigi on Gigi's debut album; she then became a lead vocalist for Bole2Harlem. The group's co-founder and producer David Schommer described her voice and singing as "a vital part of Bole2Harlem's sound."

== Death ==
Tigist died at the age of twenty-eight in Bahar Dar, Ethiopia, where she is said to have traveled on a pilgrimage shortly after she finished recording with Bole2Harlem circa January 2008. Details regarding the circumstances surrounding her death never emerged, including the exact date of her death; She was buried among family in Chagni, the town where she was born.

== Discography ==
Artist	Album	Label	Year
Gigi	Gigi	Palm Pictures	2001
Jah Wobble and Bill Laswell	Radioaxiom (A Dub Transmission)	Palm Pictures	2001
Abyssinia Infinite	Zion Roots	Network Medien	2003
Mandeng Eletrik	Man:De.Ng Eletrik	Mulatta	2004
Various artists	African Dreams	Ellipsis Arts	2004
Gigi	Gold And Wax	Palm Pictures	2006
Bole 2 Harlem	Volume 1	Sounds of the Mushroom	2006
Various artists	Un Automne 2007	Les Inrockuptibles	2007
