= Agawmeder =

Historical state and region in Ethiopia

Agawmeder (Amharic: አገው ምድር) was a historical region in the northwestern part of Ethiopia. Its most likely etymology is from Agew (አገው ägäw), a people living in the area, plus meder (land), thus meaning "Land of the Agaw". The western neighbor of Gojjam, it was located where the Agew Awi Zone now lies.

== History ==
Not much is known about Agawmeder, as much of its existence was marked by Ethiopian isolation from the remainder of the world.
