= Zengena Lake =

Crater lake in Ethiopia

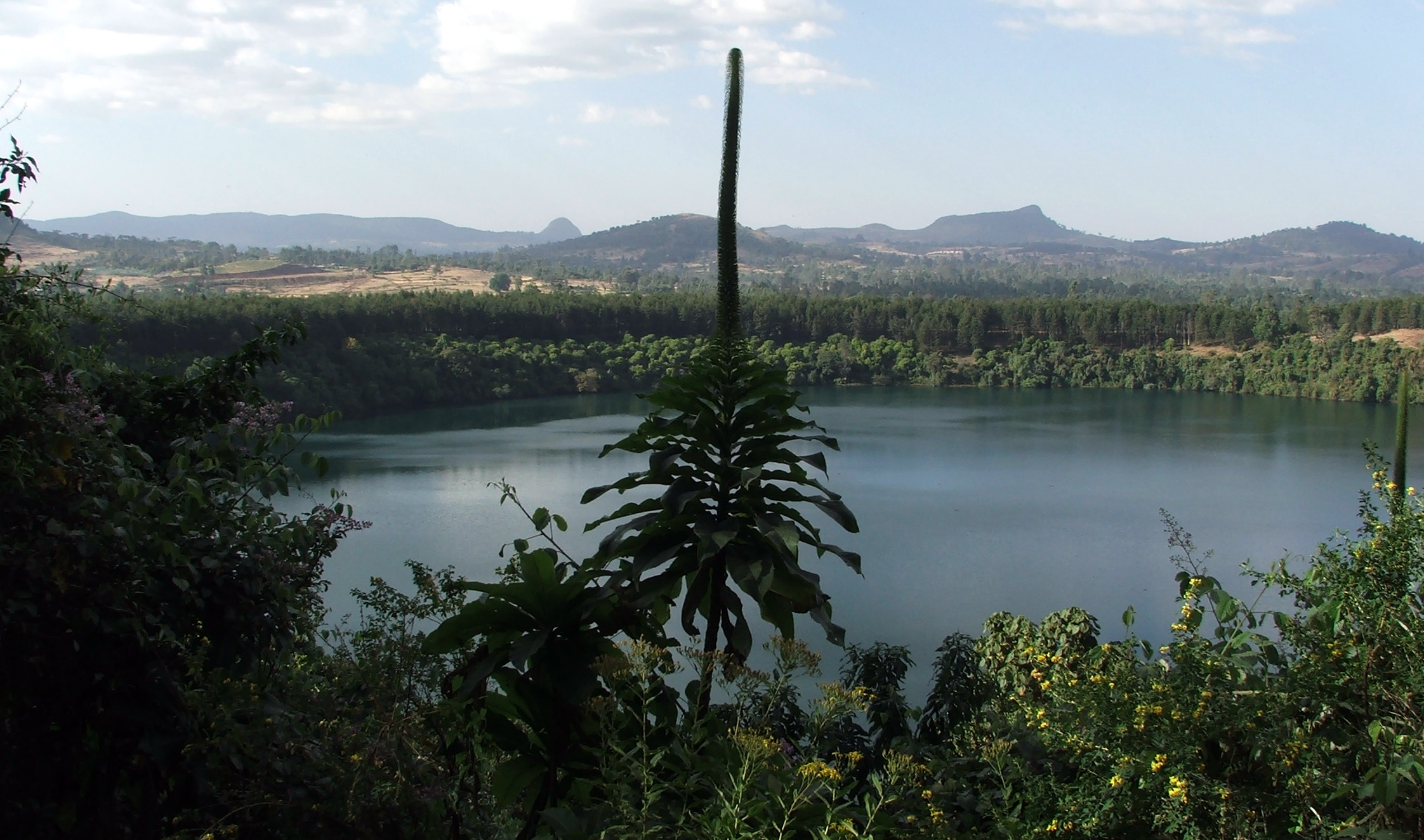
- Zengena Lake

- Location within Ethiopia
- Interactive map of Zengena Lake
- Location: Amhara Region
- Coordinates: 10°54′50″N 36°58′00″E
- Type: crater lake
- Basin countries: Ethiopia
- Max. length: 1 km (0.62 mi)
- Max. width: 1 km (0.62 mi)
- Max. depth: 166 m (545 ft)
- Surface elevation: 2,500 m (8,200 ft)

Zengena Lake (Amharic: ዘንገና ሐይቅ) is a crater lake located at 10°54′50″N 36°58′00″E in the Awi Zone of the Amhara Region in Ethiopia. It is situated between the towns of Injibara and Kessa, only 200 m from the Addis Ababa-Bahir Dar highway at an elevation of 2500 m. The diameter of the lake is roughly 1 km. With a maximum depth of 166 m, it is the second deepest lake in Ethiopia after Lake Shala. Its rim is made of unconsolidated ash deposits. Zengena Lake is most likely a maar lake formed by volcanic explosion and collapse.
