= Chagni =

Chagni ቻግኒ
- Location in Ethiopia
- Coordinates: 10°57′N 36°30′E
- Country: Ethiopia
- Region: Amhara Region
- Zone: Agew Awi Zone
- Elevation: 1,583 m (5,194 ft)

Population (2005)
  - Total: 30,938 (est)
- Time zone: UTC+3 (EAT)

Chagni (Amharic: ቻግኒ) (also known as Kedamawi Haile Selassie Ber) is a town in North Western Ethiopia. Located in the Agew Awi Zone of the Amhara Region, this town has a longitude and latitude of 10°57′N 36°30′E and an elevation of 1583 meters above sea level. It is the administrative center of Guangua woreda; in the past Chagni was the administrative center of the Metekel awraja.

== History ==
The British explorer Charles Beke visited Chagni on its market day, 17 March 1842, and found the town inhabited mostly by "Shánkalas (the Nubas of the maps), who are negroes", who fled at his appearance out of fear: "fine tall muscular men, armed with spear and knife, hurrying away and hiding themselves among the bushes as I approached".

In the 1950s, Chagni was administered by Fitawrari Embiale Gessess, whom witnesses state incorporated the current city of Chagni, and he is the father of Gebeyaw Embiale. Chagni was on the frontier between two ethnic groups who were frequently in conflict: the Gumuz and the Amhara. The Gumuz reportedly rebelled against Ethiopian rule four separate times between 1950 and 1990. However once the border between the two regions was drawn in 1992, dividing the former Metekel awraja between them, tensions lessened and local elders were able to negotiate peaceful reconciliations between the two groups. Around 1957, the primary school in Chagni was at the westernmost end of the telephone lines in Gojjam.

Famous people born in Chagni include the Ethiopian singer Gigi, as well as Gebeyaw Embiale, the Ethiopian mechanical engineer known in Ethiopia for designing components used in the Airbus 380 aircraft.

== Demographics ==
Based on figures from the Central Statistical Agency in 2005, Chagni has an estimated total population of 30,938, of whom 16,035 are men and 14,903 are women. The 1994 census reported this town had a total population of 17,777 of whom 8,437 were men and 9,340 were women.

== Climate ==
Climate data for Changni, elevation 1,720 m (5,640 ft)
Month	Jan	Feb	Mar	Apr	May	Jun	Jul	Aug	Sep	Oct	Nov	Dec	Year
Mean daily maximum °C (°F)	28.8 (83.8)	28.1 (82.6)	30.2 (86.4)	31.2 (88.2)	27.7 (81.9)	25.0 (77.0)	23.5 (74.3)	23.7 (74.7)	24.2 (75.6)	25.7 (78.3)	27.5 (81.5)	28.2 (82.8)	27.0 (80.6)
Daily mean °C (°F)	19.5 (67.1)	19.7 (67.5)	21.0 (69.8)	22.0 (71.6)	20.8 (69.4)	19.5 (67.1)	18.6 (65.5)	18.7 (65.7)	18.7 (65.7)	18.7 (65.7)	18.7 (65.7)	18.1 (64.6)	19.5 (67.1)
Mean daily minimum °C (°F)	10.1 (50.2)	11.3 (52.3)	11.8 (53.2)	12.8 (55.0)	14.0 (57.2)	14.0 (57.2)	13.6 (56.5)	13.6 (56.5)	13.0 (55.4)	11.8 (53.2)	10.1 (50.2)	7.9 (46.2)	12.0 (53.6)
Average precipitation mm (inches)	11 (0.4)	44 (1.7)	1 (0.0)	23 (0.9)	151 (5.9)	302 (11.9)	358 (14.1)	490 (19.3)	326 (12.8)	184 (7.2)	13 (0.5)	6 (0.2)	1,909 (74.9)
Average relative humidity (%)	59	54	48	49	59	72	81	80	77	69	66	63	65
Source: FAO
