= Gigi (singer) =

Ethiopian singer (born 1974)

- Born: Ejigayehu Shibabaw; 21 October 1974 (age 52)
- Origin: Chagni, Ethiopia
- Genres: Ethiopian music; trip hop; world
- Occupation: Singer
- Instrument: Vocals
- Years active: 1997–present
- Label: Palm Pictures
- Website: www.gigirecords.com www.tiktok.com/@ejigayehu_gigi

Ejigayehu Shibabaw (born 21 October 1974), known by her stage name Gigi, is an Ethiopian singer. She has performed the music of Ethiopia in combination with a wide variety of other genres, often in collaboration with her former husband Bill Laswell, a bassist and producer.

== Early life and career ==
Gigi was born and raised in Chagni in northwestern Ethiopia. She has described learning traditional songs from an Ethiopian Orthodox priest in the family home. (Note: Gigi has further claimed that "I grew up singing in the Ethiopian Church, which is actually not allowed for women…." The Ethiopian Orthodox Tewahedo Church maintains that "both men and women may join in the singing," while ethnomusicologist Kay Kaufman Shelemay notes that the church generally prohibited women from singing or playing music in church until the Derg era of the 1970s.) She lived in Kenya for a few years before moving to San Francisco in about 1998.

Gigi recorded two albums for the expatriate Ethiopian community, but it was her 2001 album, titled simply Gigi, that brought her widespread attention. She was noticed by Palm Pictures owner Chris Blackwell, who had years earlier introduced reggae to the mainstream through his former label, Island Records. Blackwell and Gigi's producer (and later, husband) Bill Laswell, decided to use American jazz musicians (including Herbie Hancock, Wayne Shorter, Pharoah Sanders, and others) to accompany Gigi on the album.

The result was a fusion of contemporary and traditional sounds. The album was a critical success internationally and generated controversy in her home country for such a radical break with Ethiopian popular music. This release was soon followed by Illuminated Audio, an ambient dub style remix of the album by Laswell.

2003 saw the release of Zion Roots, under the band name Abyssinia Infinite. Bill Laswell played guitar and keyboard (instead of his usual bass), and several of Gigi's family members contributed vocals. The album was a return to a mainly acoustic sound for Gigi, incorporating instruments such as the krar and the tabla.

Gigi's voice can be heard in the Hollywood film Beyond Borders (2003), in which Angelina Jolie portrays an aid worker during the 1984 - 1985 famine in Ethiopia.

She released her Three album, Gold and Wax on Palm Pictures, in 2006.

She has also appeared in "Running From the Light" in Buckethead's Enter the Chicken (2005). In 2010, she recorded Mesgana Ethiopia with Material, released on the M.O.D. Technologies label.

Her 2001 song "Guramayle" appears in the 2006 documentary God Grew Tired of Us. It plays over opening and closing credits.

== Personal life ==
Gigi was married to her producer Bill Laswell. Her younger sister, singer Tigist Shibabaw, died under unknown circumstances in 2008.

== Discography ==
=== As leader ===
- Tsehay, 1997
- One Ethiopia, 1998
- Gigi (Guramayle), 2001
- Illuminated Audio, 2003
- Abyssinia Infinite: Zion Roots, 2003
- Gold & Wax, 2006
- Mesgana Ethiopia, 2010

=== Other appearances ===
- Future2Future by Herbie Hancock
- Sacred System: Dub Chamber 4 (Book of Exit) by Bill Laswell
- Realize by Karsh Kale
- Live at Stern Grove by Tabla Beat Science
- Enter The Chicken by Buckethead
- Radioaxiom by Bill Laswell and Jah Wobble
- Daylightless by Fanu (in Salem and Semena-Worck tracks)
- Shin.e - Lightyears by Shin Terai and Buckethead
