= Awi people =

Ethnic group in Ethiopia

Total population
- 1,092,000

Regions with significant populations
- Ethiopia

Languages
- Awngi

Religion
- Ethiopian Orthodox Tewahedo Church

Related ethnic groups
- Other Agaw peoples

The Awi people are an ethnic group in Ethiopia and are one of the Agaw peoples. The Awi live in Agew Awi Zone west of Mirab Gojjam and have a few communities in the Metekel Zone of the Benishangul-Gumuz Region.

The Awi people are composed of seven subgroups, called Ankäša, Azäna, Chara, Qʷaqura, Banʤa, Zigän and Mätäkäl (አንከሻ ፣ አዛና ፣ ጫራ ፣ ቋቁራ ፣ ባንጃ ፣ ዚገን ፣ and መተከል). All Awi groups are classified to the Agaw line (አገው). These Awi mainly live in the Agäw Awi Zone located central Gojjam (Amhara Region), whereas small numbers of Awi groups as well reside in Mätäkäl Zone, neighboring Benishangul-Gumuz Region.

== Population ==
The 2007 census lists 631,565 ethnic Awis, or 0.85% of the total population; 63,415 are urban inhabitants. The Awi Zone, according to the Central Statistical Agency, had roughly 990,000 inhabitants in 2005. Others living in that Zone are predominantly Amharas.

== Language ==
The Awis speak Awngi, one of the Agaw languages, which are part of the Cushitic subfamily within Afroasiatic. Agaw languages form the main substratum influence on Amharic and other Ethiopian Semitic languages, which are also Afroasiatic languages.
