= Awngi language =

Cushitic language spoken in Ethiopia

Awngi
- አውጚ (Awŋi)
- Pronunciation: [ˈawŋi]
- Native to: Ethiopia
- Region: Agew Awi Zone, Amhara Region
- Ethnicity: Awi
- Native speakers: 490,000 (2007 census)
- Language family: Afro-Asiatic: Cushitic; Central; Southern; Awngi
- Dialects: Dega; Kwolla; Northern Awngi
- Writing system: Geʽez script

Language codes
- ISO 639-3: awn
- Glottolog: awng1244
- ELP: Awngi

The Awngi language, in older publications also called Awiya (an inappropriate ethnonym), is an endangered indigenous Central Cushitic language spoken by the Awi people, traditionally living in Central Gojjam in northwestern Ethiopia.

Most speakers of the language live in the Agew Awi Zone of the Amhara Region, but there are also communities speaking the language in various areas of Metekel Zone of the Benishangul-Gumuz Region. Until recently, Kunfäl, another Southern Agaw language spoken in the area west of Lake Tana, has been suspected to be a separate language. It has now been shown to be linguistically close to Awngi, and it should be classified as a dialect of that language.

== Phonology ==
=== Vowels ===
Vowels
	Front	Central	Back
Close	i	ɨ	u
Open	e	a	o

The central vowel /ɨ/ is the default epenthetic vowel of the language and almost totally predictable in its occurrence. Likewise, /æ/, normally an allophone of /a/, is fossilized in some words and might be justified as a separate phoneme.

=== Consonants ===
Consonants
		Labial	Alveolar	Palato-velar		Uvular	
		Labial	Alveolar	plain	lab.	plain	lab.
Plosive	voiceless	p	t	k	kʷ	q	qʷ
Plosive	voiced	b	d	ɡ	ɡʷ	ɢ	ɢʷ
Affricate	voiceless		t͡s	t͡ʃ			
Affricate	voiced		d͡z	d͡ʒ			
Fricative	plain	f	s	ʃ			
Fricative	post-stopped		s͡t	ʃ͡t			
Nasal		m	n	ŋ	ŋʷ		
Flap			r				
Approximant		w	l	j			

- Palatal and velar together in Awngi form only one place of articulation, which is called palato-velar.
- Post-stopped fricatives are assumed to be single segments in Awngi for phonotactic reasons.
- /h/ is found word-initially in loanwords, but it can also be left out.
- /r/ does not occur word-initially. It is pronounced as a flap [ɾ] when not geminate.
- Between vowels, /b/ is pronounced as a voiced bilabial fricative [β].
- /d/ is pronounced retracted, with slight retroflexion.
- /ɢ/ and /ɢʷ/ are usually pronounced as voiced uvular fricatives [ʁ] and [ʁʷ].
- Although /d͡z/ and /d͡ʒ/ are phonetically realized as fricatives [z] and [ʒ] in many environments, they are very much the voiced counterparts of the voiceless affricates with respect to phonological rules.
- The labialization contrast in the palato-velar and uvular consonants is found only before the vowels /i, e, a/ and word-finally.

=== Tones ===
Palmer and Hetzron both identified three distinctive tone levels in Awngi: high, mid and low. The low tone, however, only appears in word-final position on the vowel a. A falling tone (high-mid) appears on word-final syllables only. Joswig reanalyzes the system as having only two distinctive tone levels, with the low tone being a phonetic variant of the mid tone.

=== Syllable structure ===
The Awngi syllable in most cases fits the maximum syllable template CVC (C standing for a consonant, V for a vowel). This means there is only one (if any) consonant each in the syllable onset and the rhyme. Exceptions to this happen at word boundaries, where extrametrical consonants may appear.

=== Phonological processes ===
==== Gemination ====
In positions other than word-initial, Awngi contrasts geminate and non-geminate consonants. The consonants /ɢ, ɢʷ, t͡s, t͡ʃ, j, w, ʒ/, however, have no contrast in gemination.

==== Vowel harmony ====
Whenever a suffix containing the [+high] vowel i is added to a stem, a productive vowel harmony process is triggered. Hetzron calls this process regressive vowel height assimilation. The vowel harmony only takes place if the underlying vowel of the last stem syllable is e. This vowel and all preceding instances of e and o will take over the feature [+high], until a different vowel is encountered. Then the vowel harmony is blocked. Hetzron provides the following example: /moleqés-á/ ‘nun’ vs. /muliqís-í/ ‘monk’.

== Orthography ==
Awngi is used as Medium of Instruction from Grade 1 to 6 in primary schools of Awi Zone. It is written with an orthography based on the Ethiopian Script. Extra fidels used for Awngi are ጝ for the sound /ŋ/ and ቕ for the sound /q/. The fidel ፅ is used for /ts/, the fidel ኽ for the sound /ɢ/. Various aspects of the Awngi orthography are yet to be finally decided.

== Morphology ==
=== Nouns ===
The noun is marked for number and gender (masculine, feminine or plural) as well as case. The nominative is unmarked for one class of nouns, or marked by -i for masculine nouns and -a for feminine nouns. Other cases are accusative, dative, genitive, locative, directional, ablative, comitative, comparative, invocative and translative. Hetzron also mentions adverbial as a case of Awngi, but an interpretation as a derivational marker seems to be more appropriate. Number, gender, and case are marked through suffixes to the noun stems.

=== Verbs ===
The Awngi verbal morphology has a wealth of inflectional forms. The four main tenses are imperfective past, imperfective non-past, perfective past and perfective non-past. There are various other coordinate and subordinate forms which are all marked through suffixes to the verb stems. The following distinctions are maintained for person: 1sg, 2sg,,, 1pl, 2pl, and 3pl. Hetzron demonstrated that the Awngi verbal morphology is most economically described when it is assumed that for every verb there are four distinct stems, marked A, B, C, and D in the following table. The first stem (A) is for, 2pl, and 3pl. The second stem (B) is for 1sg only, the third stem (C) for 2sg and, and the fourth stem for 1pl only. These four stems need to be noted for every verb in the lexicon and serve as the basis for all other verbal morphology. The stems remain the same throughout all verbal paradigms, and it is possible to predict the surface form of each paradigm member with these stems and the simple tense suffixes.

Stems
Person/ Gender		Singular	Plural
1		B	D
2		C	A
3	Masc	A	A
3	Fem	C	A

== Syntax ==
The main verb of a sentence is always at the end. The basic word order is therefore SOV. Subordination and coordination is achieved exclusively through verbal affixation.

== Bibliography ==
- Appleyard, David L. (1996). "'Kaïliña' – A 'New' Agaw Dialect and Its Implications for Agaw Dialectology". African Languages and Cultures. Supplement No. 3, Voice and Power: The Culture of Language in North-East Africa. Essays in Honour of B. W. Andrzejewski (3): 1–19. JSTOR 586650.
- Appleyard, David L. (2006). A Comparative Dictionary of the Agaw Languages. Kuschitische Sprachstudien. Vol. 24. Köln: Rüdiger Köppe Verlag. ISBN 978-3-89645-481-2. LCCN 2006483079.
- Dryer, Matthew S.; Haspelmath, Martin, eds. (2013). "Awngi language". World Atlas of Language Structures Online. Max Planck Institute for Evolutionary Anthropology.
- Hetzron, Robert (1969). The Verbal System of Southern Agaw. Berkeley: University of California Press. LCCN 70014968.
- Hetzron, Robert (1976). "The Agaw Languages". Afroasiatic Linguistics. 3 (3).
- Hetzron, Robert (1978). "The Nominal System of Awngi (Southern Agaw)". Bulletin of the School of Oriental and African Studies. 41 (1): 121–141. doi:10.1017/S0041977X00057815. S2CID 162925064.
- Hetzron, Robert (1995). "Genitival agreement in Awngi: Variation on an Afroasiatic theme". In Plank, F. (ed.). Double case. Oxford: Oxford University Press. pp. 325–335.
- Hetzron, Robert (1997). "Awngi [Agaw] Phonology". In Kaye, Alan S. (ed.). Phonologies of Asia and Africa. Vol. 1. Winona Lake: Eisenbrauns. pp. 477–491.
- Joswig, Andreas (2006). "The Status of the High Central Vowel in Awngi". In Uhlig, Siegbert (ed.). Proceedings of the XVth International Conference of Ethiopian Studies, Hamburg July 2003. Wiesbaden: Harrassowitz. pp. 786–793.
- Joswig, Andreas (2009). "Rethinking Awngi Tone" (PDF). In Ege, Svein; Aspen, Harald; Teferra, Birhanu; Bekele, Shiferaw (eds.). Proceedings of the 16th International Conference of Ethiopian Studies. Vol. 4. Trondheim: NTNU. pp. 1417–1425. S2CID 146370463. Archived from the original (PDF) on 2020-02-18.
- Joswig, Andreas (2010). The Phonology of Awngi (PDF). SIL Electronic Working Papers. SIL International.
- Joswig, Andreas; Mohammed, Hussein (2011). A Sociolinguistic Survey Report; Revisiting the Southern Agaw Language areas of Ethiopia (Report). SIL Electronic Survey Reports. Vol. 2011–047. SIL International. Archived from the original on 2014-09-07.
- Palmer, Frank R. (1959). "The Verb Classes of Agaw (Awiya)". Mitteilungen des Instituts für Orientforschung. 7 (2). Berlin: 270–297.
- Tubiana, J. (1957). "Note sur la distribution géographique des dialectes agaw". Cahiers de l'Afrique et de l'Asie. 5: 297–306.
