= Agaw people =

Cushitic ethnic group in Ethiopia and Eritrea

Agaw አገው
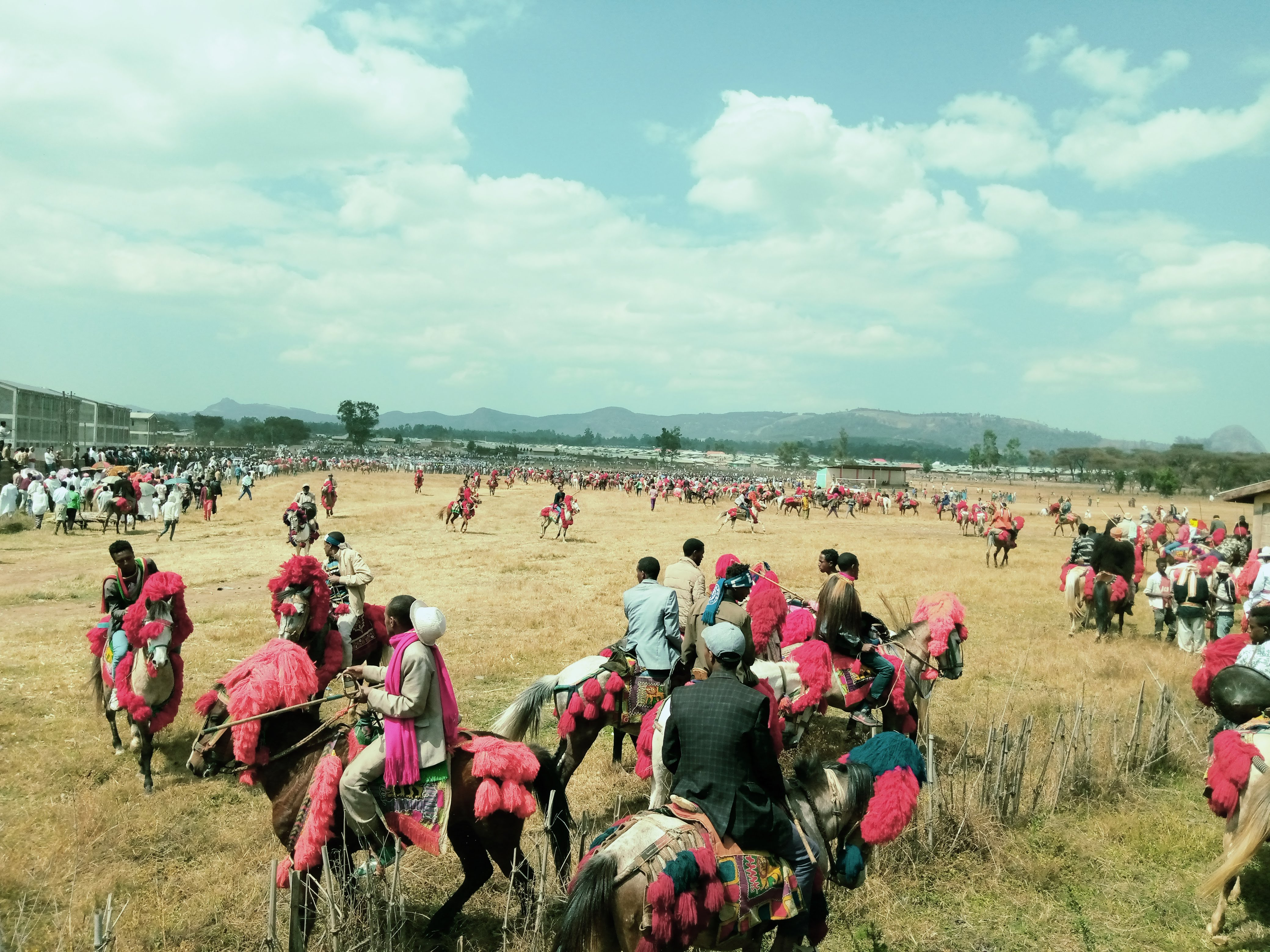
- Agaw horsemen from Awi

Regions with significant populations
- Horn of Africa
- Ethiopia: 899,416 (2007)
- Eritrea: 100,000 (2012)

Languages
- Agaw • Amharic • Tigrinya

Religion
- Christianity (Ethiopian Orthodox · Eritrean Orthodox · Catholic), Traditional religions, Judaism, Islam (Sunni)

Related ethnic groups
- Tigrinya; Tigrayans; Tigre; Amhara; Harari; Silte; Zay; Afar; Gurage; Beja; Beta Israel; Oromo; Somali; Saho; other Cushitic and Ethiosemitic peoples

The Agaw or Agew (Ge'ez: አገው, romanized: Agäw, modern Agew) are a Cushitic ethnic group native to the northern highlands of Ethiopia and neighboring Eritrea. They speak the Agaw languages, also known as the Central Cushitic languages, which belong to the Cushitic branch of the Afroasiatic language family.

The Agaw peoples in general were historically noted by travelers and outside observers to have practiced what some described as a “Hebraic religion”, though some also practiced Ethiopian Orthodoxy, and many were Beta Israel Jews. Thousands of Agaw Beta Israel converted to Christianity in the 19th and early 20th century (both voluntarily and forcibly), becoming the Falash Mura.

== History ==
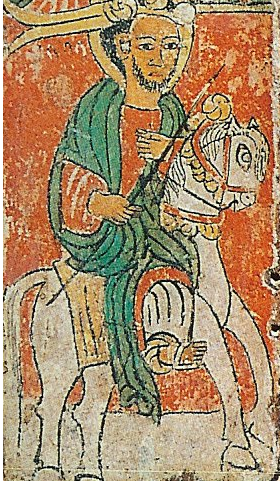
15th century icon of Lalibela, the 12th century Zagwe King.

The Agaw are first mentioned in the third-century Monumentum Adulitanum, an Aksumite inscription recorded by Cosmas Indicopleustes in the sixth century. The inscription refers to a people called "Athagaus" (or Athagaous), perhaps from ʿAd Agaw, meaning "sons of Agaw." The Athagaous first turn up as one of the peoples conquered by the unknown king who inscribed the Monumentum Adulitanum. The Agaw are later mentioned in an inscription of the fourth century Ezana of Axum, known as the Ezana Stone. Here, they are referred to as "Atagaw," a name closely resembling the earlier mention.

Cosmas Indicopleustes also noted in his Christian Topography that a major gold trade route passed through the region "Agau". The area referred to seems to be an area west of the Tekezé River and just south of the Semien Mountains, perhaps around Lake Tana. He also makes a reference to a "governor of Agau", who was entrusted by King Kaleb of Axum with the protection of the long-distance caravan routes from Agau. According to Taddesse Tamrat, Kaleb's governor of Agau probably has his seat of government in the area of Lasta, which would later serve as the center of the Zagwe dynasty.

The Cushitic Agaw formed and ruled during the Zagwe dynasty of Ethiopia from about 1137 to 1270. Post-contemporary sources would subsequently accuse the Zagwe of being usurpers and derided their achievements. The Zagwe dynastyrulers were deposed, and the throne was seized by a Semitic-speaking Amhara dynasty, which would claim to be a resumption of the Solomonic lineage of the pre-Zagwe Axumite Kingdom. Despite this, the new monarchs granted the Zagwe rulers and their descendants the title of Wagshum, allowing them to govern their native regions of Wag and Lasta.

== Language ==
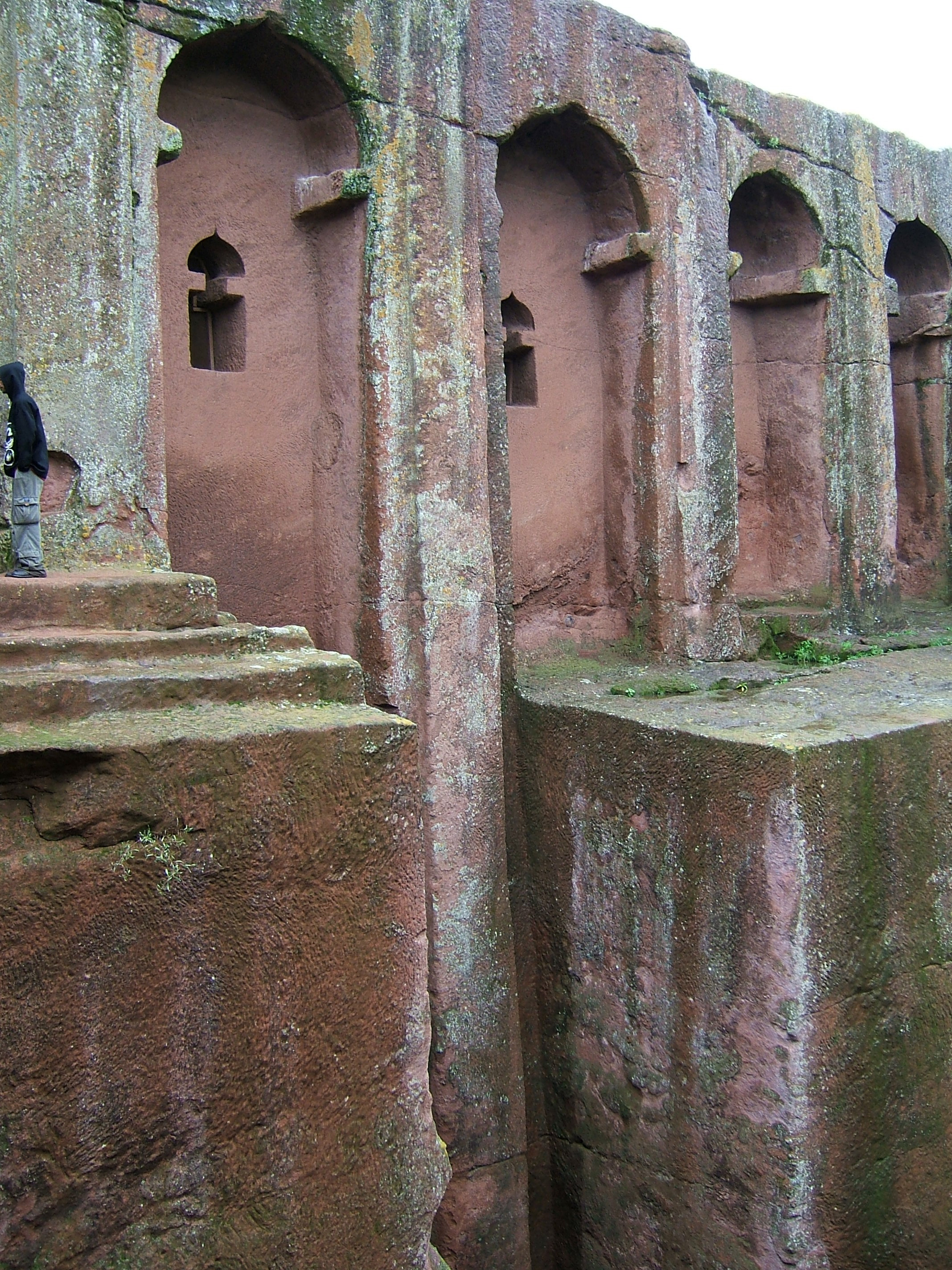
Bet Gabriel-Rufael church in Lalibela, one of several rock-hewn churches built by the medieval Zagwe dynasty

The Agaw speak the Agaw languages also known as the Central Cushitic languages which are a part of the Cushitic branch of the Afro-Asiatic family. Many also speak other languages such as Amharic, Tigrinya and/or Tigre. To varying degrees the morphology of modern day Agaw languages have also been influenced by Amharic, and the difference between the varieties of Agaw tongues is greater than the diversity of the Romance languages. In contrast the differentiation between Amharic speakers is negligible, which points to a recent spread of Ethio-Semitic languages through the Agaw homeland.

== Distribution ==
The Agaw consist of several different linguistic groups, residing in scattered communities across a wide geographical area spanning from Eritrea to Gojjam. In their local traditions, they consistently point to Lasta as their origin of dispersal.

These scattered enclaves include the Bilen in and around Keren, Eritrea; the Qemant people (including the now-relocated Beta Israel), who live around Gondar in the North Gondar Zone of the Amhara Region, west of the Tekezé River and north of Lake Tana; a number of Agaw live south of Lake Tana, around Dangila in the Agew Awi Zone of the Amhara Region; and another group live in and around Soqota in the former province of Wollo, now part of the Amhara Region, along with Lasta, Tembien, and Abergele.

== Subgroups ==
- The Northern Agaw are known as Bilen.
- The Western Agaw are known as Qemant.
- The Eastern Agaw are known as Xamir.
- The Southern Agaw are known as Awi.

== Notable people ==
- Gebre Mesqel Lalibela, ruler of Ethiopia who is credited with having constructed the rock-hewn churches of Lalibela
- Tekle Giyorgis II, Emperor of Ethiopia
- Abebaw Tadesse, Ethiopian general
- Hailu Kebede, Arbegnoch leader
- Guangul Birru, Battle of Adwa general
- Kassa Teklebirhan, Ethiopian politician

== See also ==
- Zagwe dynasty
- Bilen people
