= Agew Awi Zone =

Zone in Amhara Region of Ethiopia

Coordinates: 11°00′N 36°40′E

Agew Awi አገው አዊ
- Zone
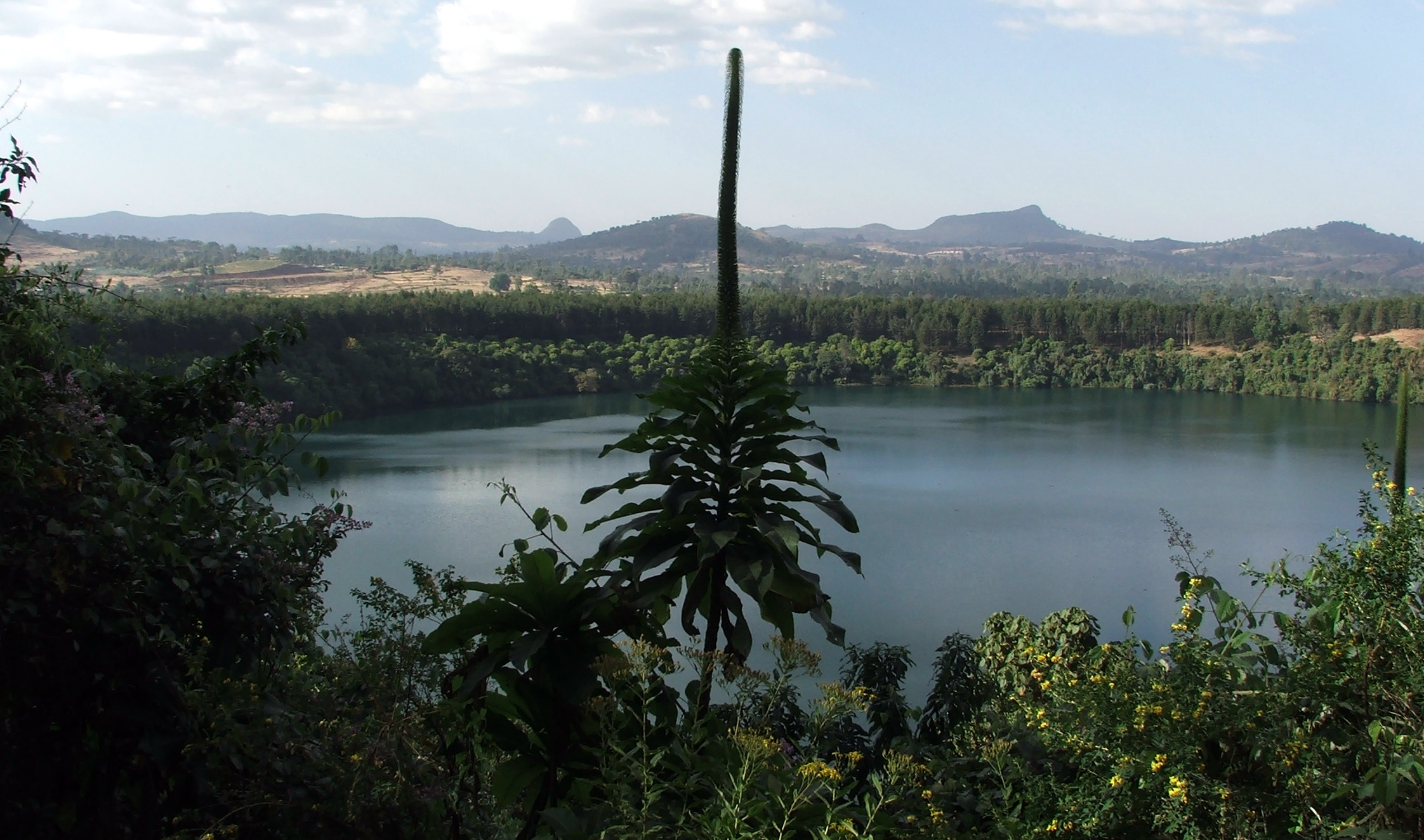

- Flag
- Interactive map of Agew Awi
- Country: Ethiopia
- Region: Amhara
- Largest city: Injibara

Area
  - Total: 9,148.43 km^{2} (3,532.23 sq mi)

Population (2012 est.)
  - Total: 1,077,144
  - Density: 117.74/km^{2} (304.95/sq mi)

A map of the regions and zones of Ethiopia

Agew Awi (Amharic: አገው አዊ), sometimes referred to as the Awi Zone, is one of Zones in the Amhara Region of Ethiopia. It is named for the Awi sub-group of the Agaw people, some of whom live in this Zone. Agew Awi Zone is bordered on the west by Benishangul-Gumuz Region, on the north by North Gondar Zone and on the east by West Gojjam. The administrative centre of Agew Awi is Injibara; other towns include Chagni, Agew Gimjabet, Tilili, Adis Kidame, Azena, Zigem, Jawi and Dangila.

Topographically speaking, Agaw Awi is relatively flat and fertile, whose elevations vary from 1,800 to 3,100 m above sea level, with an average altitude of about 2,300 m. The Zone is crossed by about nine permanent rivers which drain into the Abay (or Blue Nile); other water features include two crater lakes, Zengena and Tirba, and Zimbiri marsh which is located 5 km south-west of Addis Kidam. Local forests include Dukma and Apini, which are located on either side of the town of Kidamaja, Zengena forest around Lake Zengena, Goobil forest which is on a dome-shaped hill next to Kessa and the Khatasa Forest. The Agaw have traditionally practised a land-management system which is well adapted to the local ecology, which enables them to sustain the fertility of the soil and minimize erosion; this area is recognized as one of the most productive in the Amhara Region.

== Demographics ==
A 2012 estimate puts the population at 1,077,144. This gives a population density of 117.74 people per square kilometer (304.95 people per square mile), given its area of 9,148.43 square kilometers (3,532.23 square miles).

Based on the 2007 Census conducted by the Central Statistical Agency of Ethiopia (CSA), this Zone has a total population of 982,942, an increase of 37.07% over the 1994 census, of whom 491,865 are men and 491,077 women. With an area of 9,148.43 square km (3,532.23 square miles), Agew Awi has a population density of 107.44 people per square kilometer (278.56 people per square mile); 123,014 or 12.51% are urban inhabitants. A total of 215,564 households were counted in this Zone, which results in an average of 4.56 persons to a household, and 209,555 housing units.

The two largest ethnic groups reported in Agew Awi were the Awi (59.82%) a subgroup of the Agaw, and the Amhara (38.44%); all other ethnic groups made up 1.74% of the population. Amharic was spoken as a first language by 53.38%, and 45.04% spoke Awngi; the remaining 1.58% spoke all other primary languages reported. 94.4% practiced Ethiopian Orthodox Christianity, and 4.5% of the population said they were Muslim.

The 1994 national census reported a total population for this Zone of 717,085 in 147,917 households, of whom 357,238 were men and 359,847 women; 62,232 or 8.68% of its population were urban dwellers at the time. The three largest ethnic groups reported in Agew Awi were the Awi (49.97%) a subgroup of the Agaw, the Amhara (48.6%), and the Gumuz (0.98%); all other ethnic groups made up 0.45% of the population. Amharic was spoken as a first language by 53.75%, 44.93% Awngi, and 0.98% spoke Gumuz; the remaining 0.34% spoke all other primary languages reported. 93.52% practiced Ethiopian Orthodox Christianity, and 5.41% of the population said they were Muslim.

According to a May 24, 2004 World Bank memorandum, 6% of the inhabitants of Agew Awi have access to electricity, this zone has a road density of 39.6 km per 1000 square km (compared to the national average of 30 km ), the average rural household has 1.2 hectares of land (compared to the national average of 1.01 hectare of land and an average of 0.75 for the Amhara Region) and the equivalent of 0.5 heads of livestock. 13.6% of the population is in non-farm related jobs, compared to the national average of 25% and a Regional average of 21%. 72% of all eligible children are enrolled in primary school, and 16% in secondary schools. 54% of the zone is exposed to malaria, and 76% to Tsetse fly. The memorandum gave this zone a drought risk rating of 420.
